= A Gift of Dragons =

2002 collection of short fiction by Anne McCaffrey

A Gift Of Dragons
- Kidd cover of first editions (Note: A Gift of Dragons title listing at the Internet Speculative Fiction Database lists only the UK and US first hardcover editions of this book, with the same cover art by Thomas Kidd. Retrieved 2011-10-12.)
- Author: Anne McCaffrey
- Illustrator: Thomas Kidd
- Cover artist: Thomas Kidd; (UK & US)
- Language: English
- Series: Dragonriders of Pern
- Genre: Fantasy short story collection
- Published: 2002 (Del Rey Books)
- Publication place: United States
- Media type: Print (hardcover)
- Pages: 291
- ISBN: 978-0-345-45635-9
- OCLC: 50817877
- Dewey Decimal: 813/.54 22
- LC Class: PS3563.A255 G54 2002
- Preceded by: The Skies of Pern
- Followed by: Dragon's Kin

A Gift Of Dragons is a 2002 collection of short fiction by the American-Irish author Anne McCaffrey. All four stories are set on the fictional planet Pern; the book is one of two collections in the science fiction series Dragonriders of Pern by Anne and her son Todd McCaffrey.

== The collection ==
The stories are not united by any theme, but three of four are set about 2500 years "After Landing", the beginning of human settlement on Pern. That is just before or during the "Ninth Pass" of the "Red Star", an erratic planet that periodically brings a biological menace from space. Those three stories therefore share a Pernese historical period with most of the previous books in the series (11 of 16). (Note: The period of the so-called Red Star is 250 years, and all Pern fiction is set just before or during a Pass, roughly a multiple of 250 years "After Landing" (AL). Prior to A Gift of Dragons, McCaffrey set eleven books in the Ninth Pass about 2500 AL, two in the Sixth Pass about 1500 AL, one in the Second, and two in the First.)

The seventeenth Dragonriders of Pern book, A Gift of Dragons was the last one in the series written by Anne McCaffrey alone, before the entry of her son Todd (starting with Dragon's Kin). It was published first in the US and four months later in the UK with the same cover art, by Del Rey Books and Bantam UK, two imprints of Random House. Three of the four stories were previously published, one as a small book.

=== The Smallest Dragonboy ===
Published in Science Fiction Tales (1973, edited by Roger Elwood), and later in Creatures of the Cosmos (1977, edited by Catherine Crook de Camp), Top Fantasy: The Authors' Choice (1985, edited by Josh Pachter), and the Get Off the Unicorn collection. It was also published as a 12 page p/b in 1982 by Dragonhold Limited, Kilquade, Greystones, County Wicklow, Ireland with cover illustration sketch by Linda Albritten as a "special limited convention edition" for Albacon II, the 1983 UK Eastercon (200 copies).

"The Smallest Dragonboy" is set during the Ninth Pass. It tells of Keevan, a boy who is a candidate for Ramoth's latest clutch in Benden Weyr. Keevan is shorter than the other candidates, and is teased about this by Beterli, a boy who has stood for eight Impressions and has not been chosen. Keevan works hard but his size downgrades his abilities to most. When he overhears some of the senior dragonriders talking about dropping some of the younger candidates from the Impression, Keevan automatically thinks he will be dropped. The next day, when shoveling coal, Keevan gets in a fight with Beterli, who says he will be dropped. Keevan is badly injured and is assured by Lessa that he will have other Hatchings. When the Hatching occurs, Keevan manages to find his way to the Ground and Impresses a bronze dragon named Heth. (Note: Later in Pern history, K'van and Heth lead Southern Weyr.)

=== The Girl Who Heard Dragons ===
Published as a Cheap Street book (1986) and as the cover story of The Girl Who Heard Dragons (1994 collection)

"The Girl Who Heard Dragons" is set during the Ninth Pass. It tells of Aramina, a holdless girl who is pursued by Lady Holdless Thella for her ability to hear dragons. She is continually chased, briefly held, and rescued by K'van and Heth after being held hostage. (Note: Later in Pern history, Lady Thella continues to pursue Aramina, who is finally rescued by trader Jayge Lilcamp. They travel to the Southern Continent, where they discover and develop Paradise River Hold. Their son Readis is the protagonist of The Dolphins of Pern in which book they are major characters.)

=== Runner of Pern ===
Published in Legends (1998), ed. Robert Silverberg

"Runner of Pern" is set shortly before the Ninth Pass. It tells of a runner (messenger) named Tenna, who is new to the craft her family has been in for generations. After being accepted as an apprentice runner, Tenna begins her career, running from one end of Pern's Northern Continent to the other. During her first run to Fort Hold, Tenna is almost to her destination, running on the "trace" (paths marked by moss that are reserved for runners only) when a rider on a fast runner beast runs her off the trace. Tenna falls into a sticklebush, which are covered in sharp spines at this time of the year. The spines of the sticklebush can be dangerous as they can cause infections or enter the bloodstream. She manages to get to a runner station, where she recovers from the fall.

After telling the manager about the incident, she gains a name Haligon, the older of Lord Groghe's two sons. Haligon is known by the other runners at the Fort Hold Station to have used the traces before, nearly causing other accidents. After healing at the station for three days, Tenna goes to the Fort Hold Gather, where she identifies Haligon with some help from her new runner friends and by his stance (arrogant and haughty). After planning on how best to humiliate him, she walks up and punches Haligon, knocking him unconscious and landing him in a pile of dung. While walking back to her friends, speaks with one of the young men in Haligon's group, asking why she had attacked Haligon. Once back with her friends, she learns that she had actually attacked Haligon's twin brother Horon, the nice young man who spoke with her was actually Haligon. Worried that she may get in trouble, Tenna and her friends are met by Lord Groghe, who sincerely apologizes for his son's errors and advises the runners that Haligon will not use their traces any more. Tenna is then met by Haligon himself, who apologizes again for his actions and asks Tenna to be his guest at the gather. She accepts and after spending the entire gather with Haligon, begins to feel strong feelings for the man, which are returned in kind by Haligon. (Note: Later in Pern history, Tenna and Haligon are in a steady relationship.)

=== Ever the Twain ===
Original to the collection

"Ever the Twain" was the only story original to the collection. It tells of twins, Neru and Nian, who are inseparable. The brother Neru dreams of being a dragonrider, while the sister Nian is more practical. The two live at a hold on Ista Island. One day, when dragons come to Search, they identify Nian as a good candidate for the queen, but she will not go without Neru. The dragons take them both on Search, along with Nian's friend Orla and another boy called Chaum. At the Weyr, Orla tells Nian that another girl, named Robina, has been promised the queen. The twins work in the infirmary for a day, but on Impression, the queen dragon hatches and Nian Impresses her and learns her name is Quinth.

The two of them manage to break the egg Neru is next to, revealing a bronze dragon named Larinth, whom Neru impresses. Later, in the weyrlings' barracks, N'ru tells Nian that he was upset that she was chosen on Search and he was taken along as a mere afterthought. Nian tells him that she never wanted his dream, she wanted him to be happy. They contemplate the fact that Nian and Quinth would probably be transferred to another Weyr. Quinth assures them that they will always be held together by their dragons, and that they would never be alone.
