= Dragon's Time =

2011 novel by Anne McCaffrey

- First edition
- Author: Anne and Todd McCaffrey
- Cover artist: Les Edwards (Note: Dragon's Time title listing at the Internet Speculative Fiction Database lists 352pp and no cover artist. Inspection of a first US hardcover shows page numbers run to 321 without padding, and there is preliminary material. The jacket identifies cover artist Les Edwards.)
- Language: English
- Series: Dragonriders of Pern
- Genre: Science fiction
- Publisher: Del Rey Books
- Publication date: June 2011
- Publication place: United States
- Media type: Print (hardcover)
- Pages: 321
- ISBN: 978-0-345-50089-2
- Dewey Decimal: 813'.54—dc22
- LC Class: PS3563.A255 D755
- Preceded by: Dragongirl
- Followed by: Sky Dragons

Dragon's Time is a science fiction novel by the American-Irish author Anne McCaffrey and her son Todd McCaffrey in the Dragonriders of Pern series that she initiated in 1967. Published by Del Rey Books and released in June 2011, Dragon's Time is their fourth collaboration in the series and is the sequel to Dragongirl by Todd McCaffrey.

The McCaffreys wrote one more sequel together, Sky Dragons (published in July 2012).

== Summary ==
The frame story of Dragon's Time is set during ten days of year 508 AL (years After Landing on Pern). Now it is summer, about six months after the start of the "Third Pass" of the Red Star and its attendant Threadfall. Much of the action takes place during a long episode of time travel led by Fiona of Fort Weyr, who is the Telgar Weyrwoman now (508 AL). The primary purpose of the expedition is to survive, and to mature or to convalesce, and thus to gain man and dragonpower in the present crisis.

In all this, Dragon's Time matches Todd's Dragonheart, two books back. The differences are that is now six months rather than a few weeks after the start of the Third Pass. The refuge is in the near past, but distant in space: the smaller and unknown Western Continent, on the other side of Pern from the settled Northern Continent. There is a secondary purpose, or opportunity: both humans and dragons may reproduce (the childbearing of leading women is a theme). Fiona and the temporary Weyr she leads compose a smaller part of the story than in Dragonheart. She shares the lead, and often her queen dragon Talenth, with Lorana.

Lorana was the protagonist of Dragonsblood, Todd McCaffrey's first solo effort, three books back, but ending early in this year 508. She is the expert time traveler, who led Fiona and others on the backward journey in Dragonheart, and risked the first forward journey at the end of Dragongirl. In this book she makes many short-duration trips, some of them distant in time, and is also the expert cheater.
