= Sky Dragons =

2012 novel by Anne and Todd McCaffrey

- Cover of the UK hardback first edition
- Author: Anne McCaffrey; Todd McCaffrey
- Cover artist: Les Edwards (Note: Sky Dragons, ISFDB lists Les Edwards as cover artist for all three 2012 editions (US 1st and Book Club, UK 1st). Compared to the image of a UK first edition shown above, ISFDB's image has the dragon set a little higher with the top of the left hand tree clipped, and the treetrunks continue as background for the logo at the bottom. Their image of the US cover has the picture set lower, showing more sky with other dragons flying.)
- Language: English
- Series: Dragonriders of Pern
- Genre: Science fiction
- Publisher: New York: Del Rey Ballantine
- Publication date: 2012
- Publication place: United States
- Media type: Print
- Pages: 344
- ISBN: 978-0-345-50091-5
- OCLC: 754713873
- Preceded by: Dragon's Time

Sky Dragons is a science fiction novel by the American-Irish author Anne McCaffrey and her son Todd McCaffrey in the Dragonriders of Pern series that she initiated in 1967. Published by Del Rey Ballantine and released in July 2012, Sky Dragons is the sequel to Dragon's Time.

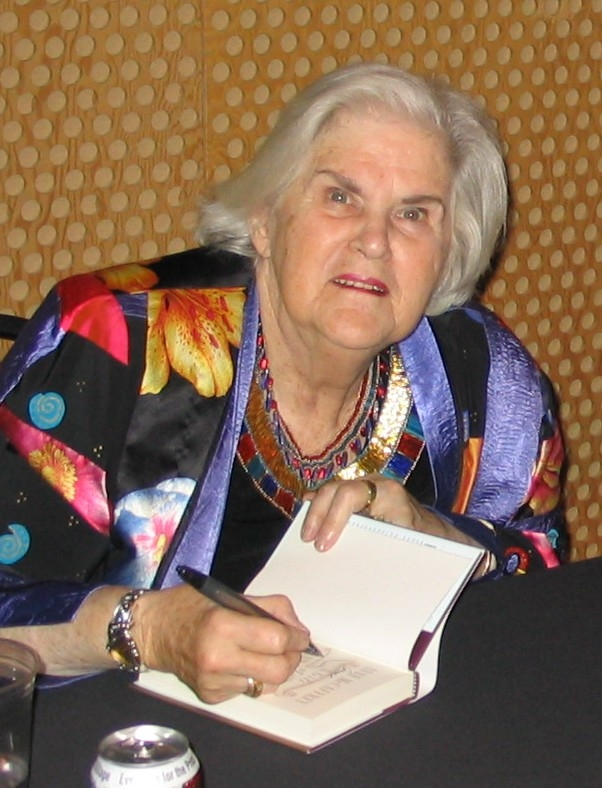
Anne McCaffrey

This was the last collaboration between mother and son, which Anne described in a foreword to Dragon's Time as "helping Todd wrap up this very dramatic part of Pernese history".

== Summary ==
Following the disease which killed many of the dragons of Pern in Dragonheart, there is no longer an adequate defense against the Thread falling in the current (third) Pass of the Red Star. The story continues with Dragongirl and Sky Dragons carries on where Dragon's Time left off.

Using the dragons' ability to travel between different times, dragonwoman Xhinna, rider of blue Tazith, and her group of blue and green dragonriders go back in time to some uninhabited islands, hoping to return in sufficient numbers to be able to fight Thread effectively. This weyr is unusual because breeding is normally the preserve of the much larger gold and bronze dragons. Xhinna, the first female weyrleader and the first female rider of a blue dragon, must overcome challenges to her leadership. The new weyr must deal with predators in the unfamiliar surroundings.

== Reception ==
Critical reaction to this novel has been mixed, with Jackie Cassada in Library Journal praising "memorable characters and a good balance of individual dramas and large-scale action", while Beth Revers in Sacramento Book Review finds that the action has crowded out character development in comparison to earlier novels.
