= The Virgin of Zesh & The Tower of Zanid =

1982 collection of science fiction novels by L. Sprague de Camp

- first combined edition of The Virgin of Zesh & The Tower of Zanid
- Author: L. Sprague de Camp
- Cover artist: Paul Alexander
- Language: English
- Series: Krishna
- Genre: Science fiction
- Publisher: Ace Books
- Publication date: 1983
- Publication place: United States
- Media type: Print (Paperback)
- Pages: 263 pp
- ISBN: 0-441-86495-3
- OCLC: 15265976
- LC Class: PS3507.E19 V48 1983

The Virgin of Zesh & The Tower of Zanid is a 1982 collection of two science fiction novels by American writer L. Sprague de Camp. Both works are part of his Viagens Interplanetarias series and of its subseries of stories set on the fictional planet Krishna. The collection was first published in paperback by Ace Books in February 1983, and reprinted in April of the same year. It was issued as the fourth volume of the standard edition of the Krishna novels, and its component parts were at the time of publication the fifth and sixth Krishna novels, chronologically. Afterwards, publication of The Bones of Zora (1983) put The Tower of Zanid seventh in order of chronology.

As with all of de Camp's "Krishna" novels, the component parts of this collection have a "Z" in them, a practice he said he devised to keep track of them. Short stories in the series do not follow the practice, nor do Viagens Interplanetarias works not set on Krishna.

== Contents ==
=== The Virgin of Zesh ===
Missionary Althea Merrick, fleeing from an unwanted marriage to a Viagens official, joins a scientist and poet en route to a utopian Terran colony on the island of Zesh, where she becomes embroiled in the affairs of some peculiarly intelligent aborigines. The story is notable for its satirization of contemporary pseudoscientific movements and for some parallels to Daniel Keyes's novel Flowers for Algernon, which it predates.

=== The Tower of Zanid ===
Adventurer Anthony Fallon, ex-ruler of the Krishnan kingdom of Zamba, has fallen on hard times. Currently he juggles dual roles as a respected member of the civic guard of Zanid, the capital of Balhib, and an undercover spy for the enemy horde of Qaathian nomads, all the while scheming to recover his lost throne. Recruited by Terran consul Percy Mjipa to yet another task, he helps an archaeologist penetrate the secrets of a forbidden temple as cover for investigating the disappearance of a number of Terran scientists. With all these irons in the fire, things cannot end well... The story features a favorable portrayal of an African character, the omnicompetent Mjipa, at a time when most science fiction still depicted such characters rarely and stereotypically.

== Setting ==
The planet Krishna is de Camp's premier creation in the Sword and Planet genre, representing both a tribute to the Barsoom novels of Edgar Rice Burroughs and an attempt to "get it right", reconstructing the concept logically, without what he regarded as Burroughs' biological and technological absurdities.

Preceded by The Prisoner of Zhamanak	Krishna novels of L. Sprague de Camp; The Virgin of Zesh	Succeeded by The Bones of Zora
Preceded by The Bones of Zora	Krishna novels of L. Sprague de Camp; The Tower of Zanid	Succeeded by The Swords of Zinjaban
