= The Virgin of Zesh =

1953 novel by Lyon Sprague de Camp

- Cover image from the first publication of The Virgin of Zesh, by L. Sprague de Camp, in Thrilling Wonder Stories, February 1953
- Author: L. Sprague de Camp
- Cover artist: Jack Coggins
- Language: English
- Series: Viagens Interplanetarias
- Genre: Science fiction
- Publisher: Standard Magazines
- Publication date: Feb 1953
- Publication place: United States
- Preceded by: The Prisoner of Zhamanak
- Followed by: The Bones of Zora

The Virgin of Zesh is a science fiction novella by American writer L. Sprague de Camp, the fourth book of his Viagens Interplanetarias series and the third of its subseries of stories set on the fictional planet Krishna. Chronologically, it is the fifth Krishna novel. It was originally published in the magazine Thrilling Wonder Stories for February 1953. It was first published in book form together with The Wheels of If in the paperback collection The Virgin & the Wheels by Popular Library in 1976. For the later standard edition of Krishna novels it was published together with The Tower of Zanid in the paperback collection The Virgin of Zesh & The Tower of Zanid by Ace Books in 1983. The first English language stand-alone edition was published as an E-book by Gollancz's SF Gateway imprint on September 29, 2011, as part of a general release of de Camp's works in electronic form. The novel has also been translated into German.

As with all of the "Krishna" novels and novellas, the title of The Virgin of Zesh has a "Z" in it, a practice de Camp claimed to have devised to keep track of them. Short stories in the series do not follow the practice, nor do Viagens Interplanetarias works not set on Krishna.

== Plot and storyline ==
Herculeu Castanhoso, assistant security officer at the Terran spaceport of Novorecife, looks on disapprovingly as his detested boss, security chief Afanasi Gorchakov, fraternizes in the spaceport bar with three new arrivals to the backward planet Krishna: the vainglorious amateur poet Brian Kirwan, psychologist Gottfried Barr, and missionary Althea Merrick. Althea has been left stranded and without resources because the unreliable Bishop Harichand Raman, her superior in the Ecumenical Monotheist Church, has failed to meet and provide her with her first assignment. Kirwan, bound with Barr for a utopian Terran colony on the island of Zesh, is trying to persuade her to join them, while Gorchakov is pressuring her to marry him. Trying to prevent a fight between the two, Althea is caught between them and knocked out, whereupon the security chief fells Kirwan and peremptorily orders Castanhoso to get the other men out of the bar. He is last seen pouring kvad down teetotaler Althea's throat in an effort to revive her.

Althea awakens in Gorchakov's apartment to discover that she consented to marry him while drunk and is now hitched. Panicking, she rejects him and tries to escape. Enraged, he strips and whips her until she breaks free and brains him with an alarm clock. Slipping out, she seeks Kirwan and Barr, who agree to spirit her out of Novorecife with Castanhoso's help and take her with them to Zesh. She is to be Barr's assistant in his project of measuring the intelligence of the primitive tailed Krishnans of Zá, the island adjacent to Zesh, whose culture has recently made startling advances. The three take flight by buggy down the Pichide River to the coastal fishing village of Qadr, whence they cross by ferry to the Free City of Majbur. There they seek the aid of Krishnan Gorbovast Bad-Sár, resident commissioner of the king of Gozashtand and well-known benefactor of Terran travelers. He gets them on the next ship out to Zesh, the Labághti, captained by Memzadá of Darya.

During the voyage, Althea is nearly raped by a sailor, who is keelhauled by Memzadá as punishment. Emerging with his lungs full of water, the sailor is revived by Althea via artificial respiration. He is perplexed by her benevolence. Later he brings her a note, asking that she not read it until after she and her companions are landed on Zesh. She complies, only to find it contains a warning: the Dasht of Darya intends to conquer both Zesh and the neighboring island of Zá, and they should leave the island. They realize the threat is serious, as Kirwan had previously discovered the Labághti is carrying a large load of weapons. But by this time the ship has sailed, and they are stranded.

The trio is greeted by a welcoming party from the utopian colony of Elysion, including its leader, Diogo Kuroki, who calls himself Zeus. The colonists, a group of Roussellian naturalists, have all taken new names from Classical myth, legend or history. Kuroki redubs Kirwan, who has come to join the colony, Orpheus. The others are told they can work for their keep until they gain permission to continue on to Zá. Althea tells Kuroki of the coming attack, but he refuses either to leave Zesh, take any defensive measures, or even to warn the Záva from whom the colony rents its land, citing his group's principles of pacifism and neutrality. In the days that follow all three grow increasingly disenchanted with the colony, and decide to inform the Záva of the impending invasion themselves in return for passage out of the war zone. To do so they secretly visit the Záva oracle the Virgin of Zesh, but she takes off precipitously on hearing their news, without responding to their request.

Cover art from The Virgin & the Wheels, Popular Library, 1976, featuring Althea's rescue by Yuruzh from The Virgin of Zesh.

The next morning the island is visited by Yuruzh, chief of the Záva, ostensibly to visit the oracle, but actually to contest the Daryava invasion, of which he has been informed by the Virgin of Zesh. He reprimands Kuroki for having withheld the intelligence. Yuruzh is much more human-looking than the rest of the apelike Záva, and Althea finds herself attracted to him. The invasion fleet is sighted, and she is recruited to set a trap for the enemy. At Yuruzh's direction, she swims out to the flagship pretending to have escaped the chief and claiming that he is on Zesh with just a few followers. Sofkar, the Dasht of Darya, has her bound to the mast with orders that she be killed if her story proves false, and takes his ships into the harbor. They founder on a line of submerged stakes set by Záva hiding in the water, who then swarm aboard. Yuruzh takes the Dasht captive and rescues Althea as his main fleet issues forth from Zá to take the Daryava from behind. After the battle the people of Elysion, having overthrown Kuroki, deliver him to Yuruzh to assuage his displeasure with the colony.

At this point a merchant ship appears and lands two unwelcome interlopers: Bishop Raman and Afanasi Gorchakov. The latter claims Althea; she appeals to Raman but he declines to defend her on the grounds that she is married to the security chief and has compromised her reputation by running off with Kirwan and Barr, as well as by going around naked (which is common behavior in this tropical climate). Gorchakov abducts her at gunpoint, killing Kirwan when he tries to intervene. Barr has already fled. Abandoning Raman, Gorchakov forces Althea aboard his ship, the Ta'zu, and puts out to sea. In his cabin he prepares to torture and murder her for abandoning him, but is interrupted by a thrown knife and then Yuruzh, who swings in through the porthole. The Terran and Krishnan fight, struggling for the knife. Yuruzh prevails and kills Gorchakov.

Yuruzh explains to Althea that he had followed the Ta'zu and quietly taken the ship. After sounding her out on her current plans and prospects, he proposes marriage, stating he has admired her since first laying eyes on her. He also reveals the secret of the Záva's intelligence; when younger, he had been taken to Earth and given the experimental "Pannoëtic treatment", which turns lower primates into geniuses while driving human beings mad. (The rationale behind the treatment spoofs pseudo-scientific ideas current in the 1950s, particularly those of L. Ron Hubbard.) As a Krishnan and a hybrid between the advanced tailless and the primitive tailed races, Yuruzh might have gone either way, but in the event gained super-intelligence. Feigning that the treatment wore off, he was permitted to return to Krishna, where he has been uplifting his tailed compatriots by giving them the same treatment. He asks Althea to be his wife, and partner in his civilizing mission.

Althea, after some thought, accepts both of Yuruzh's offers, and the two proceed out to the captive ship's captain to be married. Though they cannot have children, there is every indication that they will have a happy and harmonious life.

== Setting ==
The planet Krishna is de Camp's premier creation in the Sword and Planet genre, representing both a tribute to the Barsoom novels of Edgar Rice Burroughs and an attempt to "get it right", reconstructing the concept logically, without what he regarded as Burroughs' biological and technological absurdities. De Camp intended the stories as "pure entertainment in the form of light, humorous, swashbuckling, interplanetary adventure-romances — a sort of sophisticated Burroughs-type story, more carefully thought out than their prototypes."

As dated in the 1959 version of de Camp's essay "The Krishna Stories" and James Cambias's GURPS Planet Krishna (a 1997 gaming guide to the Viagens series authorized by de Camp), the action of The Virgin of Zesh takes place in A.D. 2150, falling between The Prisoner of Zhamanak and The Bones of Zora, and making it the ninth story set on Krishna in terms of internal chronology. Internal evidence in The Bones of Zora confirms the relative sequence of the stories.

Yuruzh may have been the unnamed tailed Krishnan resident at an Earthly scientific institute in de Camp's earlier Viagens story "The Colorful Character".

== Relation to other works ==
Another instance of de Camp's use of a "lower" species raised to intelligence by scientific means can be found in his earlier short story "The Blue Giraffe" (1939). He also addressed the theme of future idealists attempting to create a primitive utopia on another planet in his later short story "New Arcadia" (1956). Yuruzh's back-story bears a striking resemblance to the basic plot of Daniel Keyes's story "Flowers for Algernon" (1959, expanded to novel-length in 1966), though Yuruzh, unlike Keyes's protagonist Charlie Gordon, merely feigns losing his newly gained intelligence. The Virgin of Zesh predates Keyes's story.

== Sources ==
- Cambias, James (1997). GURPS Planet Krishna. Steve Jackson Games.
- De Camp, L. Sprague. "The Krishna Stories " (Essay, in New Frontiers, v. 1, no. 1, December 1959, page 6)
- Laughlin, Charlotte; Daniel J. H. Levack (1983). De Camp: An L. Sprague de Camp Bibliography. San Francisco: Underwood/Miller. pp. 102, 257, 261.

| Preceded by The Prisoner of Zhamanak | Krishna tales of L. Sprague de Camp; The Virgin of Zesh | Succeeded by The Bones of Zora |
