= The Story of Science in America =

1967 book by L. Sprague de Camp and Catherine Crook de Camp

- Dust jacket from first edition of The Story of Science in America
- Author: L. Sprague de Camp and Catherine Crook de Camp
- Illustrator: Leonard Everett Fisher
- Cover artist: Leonard Everett Fisher
- Language: English
- Subject: History, Science
- Publisher: Charles Scribner's Sons
- Publication date: 1967
- Publication place: United States
- Media type: Print (Hardback)
- Pages: 282 pp

The Story of Science in America is a 1967 science book by L. Sprague de Camp and Catherine Crook de Camp, illustrated by Leonard Everett Fisher, published by Charles Scribner's Sons. It has been translated into Spanish, Portuguese, Burmese and French.

== Summary ==
The book traces the work of inventors and naturalists in the United States from the Colonial era through the mid-19th century, and relates scientific developments in the century following.

== Contents ==
- Part One - Science Comes to America
  - I - Science in the Colonies
  - II - Benjamin Franklin's Century
  - III - American Explorers and Expeditions
  - IV - The World of Nature
  - V - Early Inventors and Inventions
  - VI - The Great Industrial Revolution
- Part Two - The Physical Sciences
  - VII - The Exact Sciences
  - VIII - The Sky Above
  - IX - The Earth and its Waters
  - X - The Revolution in Physics
- Part Three - The Biological Sciences
  - XI - The Sciences of Life
  - XII - The Most Marvelous Machine
  - XIII - The Sciences of Man
- Part Four - The Applied Sciences
  - XIV - The Electrical Revolution
  - XV - The Internal-Combustion Revolution
  - XVI - The Dangerous Depths of Space
  - XVII - Scientists of Today and Tomorrow
- Notes
- Selected Bibliography
- Index

== Reception ==
Critical response to the book was positive. Jane E. Brody, writing for The New York Times, called it "a fast-moving, informative and thoroughly enjoyable chronicle, with amusing anecdotes, legends and interesting sidelights that reflect the personalities, lives and times of the men who shaped our nation scientifically." She noted that "the authors have kept their writing free of chauvinism," and that "[m]ost of the scientific concepts are well enough explained so that even the newcomer to science should be able to grasp at least the essence of them." In the same issue the book was included among seventy-five recommended titles selected by the Children's Editor of the newspaper's Book Review, described as an "[i]nformative, thoroughly enjoyable chronicle of the development of science in our country."

Publishers' Weekly stated that "[t]o read the index ... is to read the names of the men and of their discoveries in science in America, from the earliest days ... to the space age. To read the book is to become familiar with the men and their contributions to science."

George Basalia, writing for Library Journal, called the book "a first-rate history of American science and technology for high-school students ... cover[ing] major American technical discoveries as well as our contributions to the purely theoretical aspects of science." He found "much to be praised ... the book is intelligently conceived, carefully organized, clearly written, and handsomely designed. Unfortunately, the illustrations do not do justice to [the] excellent text."

H. D. Allen in the Montreal Gazette wrote that the book's story "makes fascinating reading," and that "[w]hile the treatment of any one discipline may at first seem superficial and chatty, the total impact is most impressive, for the reader is left with an acquaintance with the leading figures of the age of science and some appreciation of how the contribution of each influenced a way of life." He concluded "The breadth of scientific knowledge which this book represents is remarkable, as is the skill with which it has been set down and the effortlessness with which it reads."

The Booklist called it "[a] wide-ranging survey [that] reflects the authors' humanistic interests as well as their familiarity with several branches of science and their extensive background reading."

Harry C. Stubbs in The Horn Book Magazine included it among "half a dozen books dealing ... with the history of science [that] I can recommend [both] to nonscientists as guides toward the Light [and] to scientists and science teachers as reminders that what we know was long, slow, and hard in coming." He noted that it "give[s] us a series of fascinating biographical and anecdotal items strung loosely on the thread of developing scientific knowledge."

Philip and Phylis Morrison in Scientific American felt it "manages to convey a sense of coherence, even though it deals at staccato length with so many men, trends and ideas ... The reason is partly in the expert writing--smooth, unusually candid, cheerful and sometimes a bit condescending (as in the two or three pages about Veblen)." They add that "[n]ot all the dicta of the authors seem reasonable, but to find any personal judgment at work is so rare in this kind of pedagogy that one is pleased by the De Camps even when one disagrees with them."
