= The Worlds of Science =

Literary series published by Pyramid Books in the 1960s

Elephant, by L. Sprague de Camp, Pyramid Books, 1964.

The Worlds of Science is a series of science book paperbacks by various authors published by Pyramid Books in the 1960s. The series included both reprints of works originally published independently and new works written especially for the series. Prominent contributors included Isaac Asimov and L. Sprague de Camp, among others.

Books in the series include:

1. The Human Brain, by John Pfeifer
2. Maya, by Charles Gallenkamp
3. Nine Planets, by Alan E. Nourse
4. Living Earth, by Peter Farb
5. Chemistry Creates a New World, by Bernard Jaffe
6. The Road to Man, by Herbert Wendt
7. Giants of Science, by Philip Cane
8. Snakes of the World, by Raymond Ditmars
9. The ABC of Physics, by Jerome S. Meyer
10. Computers, by Stanley L. Englebardt
11. Man and Dolphin, by John C. Lilly
12. Kingdom of the Octopus, by Frank W. Lane
13. Dinosaurs, by Nicholas Hotton III
14. The Story of Weather, by Capt. David C. Holmes, USN
15. Fact and Fancy, by Isaac Asimov
16. Electronics, by Stanley L. Englebardt
17. Conquest of the Moon, by William Hines
18. Elephant, by L. Sprague de Camp
19. New Worlds of Oceanography, by Captain John E. Long
20. New Frontiers in Medicine, by Stanley Englebardt
21. The Human Machine, by Harry Moody
22. The Borders of Mathematics, by Willy Ley
23. Volcanoes and Earthquakes, by Elliott B. Roberts
