= Dragon Harper =

2007 novel by Anne McCaffrey

- Youll cover of US editions (Note: Dragon Harper title listing at the Internet Speculative Fiction Database lists cover artist Paul Youll for all three US editions and Les Edwards for the one UK edition.)
- Author: Anne and Todd McCaffrey
- Cover artist: Paul Youll; Les Edwards (UK)
- Language: English
- Series: Dragonriders of Pern
- Genre: Science fiction
- Publisher: Del Rey Books
- Publication date: 26 December 2007
- Publication place: United States
- Media type: Print (hardback & paperback)
- Pages: 298 (first US edition)
- ISBN: 978-0-345-48030-9
- OCLC: 154309096
- Dewey Decimal: 813/.54 22
- LC Class: PS3563.A255 D73 2007
- Preceded by: Dragon's Fire
- Followed by: Dragonheart

Dragon Harper is a science fiction novel by the American-Irish author Anne McCaffrey and her son Todd McCaffrey, part of the Dragonriders of Pern series that she initiated in 1967. Published forty years later, it was the twenty-first in the series.

Dragon Harper and the previous novels Dragon's Kin and Dragon's Fire feature the character Kindan as a boy and young man, about 500 years after landing on Pern (500 AL). They were the first collaborations by mother and son.

== Plot description ==
Similar to Moreta: Dragonlady of Pern and Nerilka's Story (near the end of the Sixth Pass), this book is set in a time of a pandemic that threatens human life on Pern (just before the third return of Thread, or Third Pass).

The story focuses on the character Kindan, featured in Dragon's Kin, who has taken a position as an apprentice at the Harper Hall. In the school-like setting, Kindan has to deal with a bully, a blossoming forbidden relationship, and his role as a protector for new female apprentices after the Masterharper breaks the former taboo against female harpers. The book then deals with an influenza-like pandemic that threatens the lives of holders, as the Weyrs must maintain a quarantine to keep their rosters healthy enough to fight the next Threadfall.

The story additionally explains the loss of many of the records kept prior to, during and after colonization, further reducing the Pernese connection with its off-planet origins.
