= The Fringe of the Unknown =

1983 science book by L. Sprague de Camp

- Cover of The Fringe of the Unknown
- Author: L. Sprague de Camp
- Language: English
- Subject: Science
- Publisher: Prometheus Books
- Publication date: 1983
- Publication place: United States
- Media type: Print (Hardback)
- Pages: 208 pp
- ISBN: 0-87975-217-3
- OCLC: 221198761

The Fringe of the Unknown is a science book by L. Sprague de Camp, first published in hardcover and paperback by Prometheus Books in 1983.

== Summary ==
The book is a collection of articles that constitute a "study ... of controversial and often little-known happenings in science and technology, with an emphasis on the wayward activities of those who dabble in fringe science." The material is organized in three sections, "Our Ingenious Forebears," "Beasts of Now and Then," and "Scientists, Mad and Otherwise." The first debunks extravagant occult and pseudoscientific claims regarding ancient civilizations while highlighting these cultures' actual accomplishments. The second performs much the same function in regard to biology, focusing on elephants, claims regarding the survival of dinosaurs into the present day, and past extinction events. The third explores the distinction between science and pseudoscience as illustrated in the lives of a number of scientists holding extreme views.

== Contents ==
Part I. Our Ingenious Forebears

1. "The Wisdom of the Ancients" (from Science Fiction Quarterly, Nov. 1951)
2. "Apollonios Enlists" (from Astounding Science Fiction, Jun. 1961)
3. "Appius Claudius Crassus" (original title: "Appius Claudius Crassus: Roman Builder") (from Science Digest, Jun. 1962)
4. "The First Missile Launchers" (from Science Digest, Oct. 1960)
5. "The Iron Pillar of Delhi" (from Analog Science Fiction/Science Fact, Sep. 1972)
6. "The Mechanical Wizards of Alexandria" (from Science Digest, Aug. 1962)
7. "The Landlocked Indian Ocean" (from The Magazine of Fantasy & Science Fiction, Jun. 1969)

Part II. Beasts of Now and Then

8. "Dinosaurs Today" (original title: "Dinosaurs in Today's World") (from The Magazine of Fantasy & Science Fiction, Mar. 1968)
9. "Mammoths and Mastodons" (from The Magazine of Fantasy & Science Fiction, May 1965)
10. "Death Comes to the Megafauna" (from If Worlds of Science Fiction, Sep. 1971)
11. "Xerxes' Okapi" (original title: "Xerxes' Okapi and Greek Geography") (from Isis, Mar. 1963)
12. "The Temperamental Tank" (original title: "War Elephants") (from Elephant, 1964)
13. "How to Plan a Fauna" (from The Magazine of Fantasy & Science Fiction, Oct. 1963)

Part III. Scientists, Mad and Otherwise

14. "The Care and Feeding of Scientists" (original title: "The Care and Feeding of Mad Scientists") (from Astounding Science Fiction, Jul. 1951)
15. "The Great Whale Robbery" (from The Day of the Dinosaur, 1968)
16. "Mad Men of Science" (originally published in two parts, as "Mad Men of Science" and "More Mad Men of Science") (from Future Science Fiction, Jan. and Mar. 1957)
17. "Orthodoxy in Science" (from Astounding Science Fiction, May 1954)
18. "Hoaxes in Science" (original title: "Why Do They Do It?") (from Astounding Science Fiction, Sep. 1950)
19. "Little Green Men from Afar" (from The Humanist, Jul./Aug. 1976)
20. "The Need to Know" (original title: "Pure Science") (from The Book of Knowledge Annual, 1959)
"Acknowledgments"

== Reception ==
Joel W. Hedgpeth, noting that the book's "assemblage of articles" includes "all sorts of more-or-less scientific subjects," feels de Camp "writes about these matters in ... good-humored spirit, but with a ... substantial factual basis." While highlighting the essays on sea serpents, the extinction of the megafauna, the "strange story of the okapi," and the Cope-Marsh feud, Hedgpeth states "[h]is most entertaining piece is about the use of elephants in warfare, which is aptly titled 'The Temperamental Tank.'"
