= America Moves Forward =

1960 children's history book

America Moves Forward: A History for Peter
- Author: Gerald W. Johnson
- Illustrator: Leonard Everett Fisher
- Language: English
- Series: A History for Peter
- Genre: U.S. History
- Publisher: Morrow
- Publication date: 1960
- Publication place: United States
- Pages: 256
- Preceded by: America Grows Up: A History for Peter

America Moves Forward: A History for Peter is a children's history book written by Gerald W. Johnson in 1960 and illustrated by Leonard Everett Fisher. It is the third book in the series A History for Peter, written for Johnson's grandson Peter, following America Is Born and America Grows Up, and covers United States history from 1917. It was a Newbery Honor book in 1961.
