= Creatures of the Cosmos =

Collection of fantasy and science fiction stories

- Dust-jacket illustration of Creatures of the Cosmos
- Author: edited by Catherine Crook de Camp
- Illustrator: Jay Krush
- Cover artist: Jay Krush
- Language: English
- Genre: Fantasy and Science fiction short stories
- Publisher: Westminster Press
- Publication date: 1977
- Publication place: United States
- Media type: Print (Hardback)
- Pages: 152 pp
- ISBN: 0-664-32621-8
- Preceded by: Tales Beyond Time

Creatures of the Cosmos is an anthology of fantasy and science fiction short stories for younger readers, edited by Catherine Crook de Camp. It was first published in hardcover by Westminster Press in 1977. It was the third such anthology assembled by de Camp, following the earlier 3000 Years of Fantasy and Science Fiction (1972) and Tales Beyond Time (1973), both of which she edited together with her husband L. Sprague de Camp.

== Summary ==
The book collects eight tales by various authors, in each of which "a strange beast, or one having unearthly qualities, plays a prominent role," with an overall introduction and a bibliography of recommended reading by de Camp. One piece, "The Bear Who Saved the World," was adapted for younger readers by the editor from her husband's short story "The Command."

== Contents ==
- "A Word from the Editor" (Catherine Crook de Camp)
- "The Bear Who Saved the World" (L. Sprague de Camp and Catherine Crook de Camp)
- "Old Man Henderson" (Kris Neville)
- "The Million Dollar Pup" (Catherine Crook de Camp)
- "The Smallest Dragonboy" (Anne McCaffrey)
- "The Large Ant" (Howard Fast)
- "Dead Man's Chest" (L. Sprague de Camp)
- "Socrates" (John Christopher)
- "The Horse Show" (Catherine Crook de Camp)
- "Other Worlds, Other Times—Books You Will Enjoy" (Catherine Crook de Camp)

== Reception ==
Anne C. Raymer in School Library Journal wrote "High caliber writing is the norm" in the book, with "supernormal beasts like the first robot dog (editor De Camp's "Million Dollar Pup") and the telepathic "Smallest Dragon Boy" on Pern (the planet popularized in three of Anne McCaffrey's novels) are bound to impress sci-fi fans." She noted the stories were "thematically related in their focus on intelligent and friendly animal life," and despite the age of some of the contributions, felt "none are literary relics nor are they filled with outmoded scientific ideas."

Betsy Herne, writing in Booklist, called the collection "uneven, with McCaffrey's 'The Smallest Dragonboy' being one of the best" pieces. She found the stories written or co-written by the editor "intriguing despite some awkwardness in the writing," but those by Fast and Neville "abstract and confusing." She did not address the remaining contributions. Her ultimate assessment was favorable, since "few science fiction collections exist for this age group, and the tie-in here with animals is likely to appeal."
