= America Is Born: A History for Peter =

1959 children's history book

America is Born: A History for Peter
- Author: Gerald W. Johnson
- Illustrator: Leonard Everett Fisher
- Language: English
- Series: A History for Peter
- Genre: U.S. History
- Publisher: Morrow
- Publication date: 1959
- Publication place: United States
- Pages: 254
- Followed by: America Grows Up: A History for Peter

America Is Born: A History for Peter is a 1959 children's history book written by American writer Gerald W. Johnson and illustrated by American artist Leonard Everett Fisher. It is the first book in the series A History for Peter, written for Johnson's grandson Peter, and covers U.S. history from the arrival of Christopher Columbus in North America to the Constitutional Convention in 1787; it was followed by America Grows Up and America Moves Forward. The book earned a Newbery Honor in 1960.
