= The Swords of Zinjaban =

1991 novel by Lyon Sprague de Camp

- first edition of The Swords of Zinjaban
- Author: L. Sprague de Camp and Catherine Crook de Camp
- Cover artist: Thomas Kidd
- Language: English
- Series: Krishna
- Genre: Science fiction
- Publisher: Baen Books
- Publication date: 1991
- Publication place: United States
- Media type: Print (Paperback)
- Pages: 309
- ISBN: 0-671-72039-2
- OCLC: 23077189
- Preceded by: The Tower of Zanid

The Swords of Zinjaban is a science fiction novel written by L. Sprague de Camp and Catherine Crook de Camp, the eleventh book of the former's Viagens Interplanetarias series and the eighth of its subseries of stories set on the fictional planet Krishna. Chronologically it is the eighth Krishna novel as well. It was first published in paperback by Baen Books in February 1991. An E-book edition was published by Gollancz's SF Gateway imprint on September 29, 2011 as part of a general release of de Camp's works in electronic form.

As with all of the "Krishna" novels, the title of The Swords of Zinjaban has a "Z" in it, a practice de Camp claimed to have devised to keep track of them. Short stories in the series do not follow the practice, nor do Viagens Interplanetarias works not set on Krishna.

== Plot summary ==
Fergus Reith, the main Terran tour guide on Krishna, is at the spaceport of Novorecife to meet his latest clients, the advance party for Cosmic Productions. Cosmic is an earthly motion picture company planning to shoot the first movie on the planet, a gaudy swashbuckler to be titled Swords Under Three Moons. Fergus is surprised to find among the party his ex-wife Alicia Dyckman, who left Krishna twenty years before; she in turn is surprised to find him the father of a teenage son, Alister, by a later wife now deceased. Fergus learns Alicia has undergone psychotherapy to correct the personality flaws that had doomed their marriage, and that moreover she is the one who recommended his services to the film company.

Alicia introduces Fergus to her colleagues, Cyril Ordway and Jacob White, and soon the two are squiring them around the local realms to scout filming locations and hire locals as extras, including a company of soldiers for the battle scenes. In addition to the usual complications of mediating between egocentric Terrans and temperamental Krisnans, the ex-lovers warily attempt to sort out their feelings for each other, a task rendered all the more difficult because others are also interested in Alicia—and they keep running into Fergus’ old flames at awkward moments!

Finally the advance party’s work is done, and the rest of the company arrives, headed by the dour producer Kostis Stavrakos and the flamboyant director Attila Fodor, who fancies himself a reincarnated barbarian. Filming soon begins in the native republic of Mikardand.

Meanwhile, Fergus is sent north on an errand to Ruz, where he is unexpectedly imprisoned by the local ruler, the Dasht Gilan bad-Jam, who suspects him (rightly) of having conspired to sabotage Gilan’s intended marriage to Princess Vazni of Dur. Vazni, one of those old flames of Fergus, had appealed to him to help her escape Gilan. Fergus is able to allay his captor’s suspicions, and is even freed and granted a knighthood in return for teaching the Dasht how to play poker!

Soon after his return Alicia is kidnapped by another Krishnan ruler, Dour Vizman of Qirib, who is besotted with her. Fergus rides to save her, but is just in time to help her escape, she having already knifed Vizman. Later, back with the film crew, they finally decide to get married again.

During the main filming at the border fortress of Zinjaban, Terran diplomat Percy Mjipa arrives bearing warning that Ghuur, the Kamoran of the much-feared nomad horde of Qaath, is about to invade Mikardand, and the Cosmic Productions operation is right in his path. The knights of Mikardand hired as extras for the movie immediately take charge to organize a defense, aided by those Terrans able to handle a sword, such as Reith, Fodor, local consul Anthony Fallon and lead actor Randal Fairweather. Thanks to strategic advice from Fergus and the fortuitous beheading of the Kamoran by the battle-crazed Fodor (also killed), the nomads are defeated.

In the wake of the battle the sobered movie-makers hurriedly conclude their filming, only to face a final hurdle—the abduction of Alicia and leading lady Cassie Norris by Enrique Schlegel, a Terran gone native fanatically opposed to what he sees as the alien corruption of Krishnan culture. He threatens to kill them unless all the company’s film footage and filming equipment are destroyed. Once again Fergus finds himself leading a rescue expedition. With good planning coupled with good luck the bandits are defeated and Schlegel killed.

Despite all their services to Cosmic Productions, Stavrakos manages to skip planet without paying Fergus and Alicia what is owed them. On a brighter note, they are now married again, and have each other, Alister, and another child on the way, and are looking forward to helping to establish a college in Novorecife for Terrans settled on Krishna.

== Setting ==
The planet Krishna is de Camp's premier creation in the Sword and Planet genre, representing both a tribute to the Barsoom novels of Edgar Rice Burroughs and an attempt to "get it right", reconstructing the concept logically, without what he regarded as Burroughs' biological and technological absurdities. De Camp intended the stories as "pure entertainment in the form of light, humorous, swashbuckling, interplanetary adventure-romances - a sort of sophisticated Burroughs-type story, more carefully thought out than their prototypes."

As dated in James Cambias's GURPS Planet Krishna (a 1997 gaming guide to the Viagens series authorized by de Camp), the action of The Swords of Zinjaban takes place in the year 2176 AD., following The Tower of Zanid, and making it the twelfth story set on Krishna in terms of chronology. Internal evidence in the novel confirms the relative sequence of the stories, but also puts it about twenty years after the events of The Bones of Zora, which would shift the action of the story a few years earlier, to about 2171.

== Reception ==
Don D'Ammassa, addressing this and other late entries in the Viagens series, writes "[t]he quality of the series remains undiminished in [these] volumes, which combine good-natured mayhem and a crisp, exciting narrative style.

Preceded by The Tower of Zanid	Krishna tales of L. Sprague de Camp; The Swords of Zinjaban	Succeeded by none
