= Tales Beyond Time =

1973 anthology edited by L. Sprague de Camp and Catherine Crook de Camp

- Dust-jacket illustration of Tales Beyond Time
- Editors: L. Sprague de Camp and Catherine Crook de Camp
- Illustrator: Ati Forberg
- Cover artist: Ati Forberg
- Language: English
- Genre: Fantasy and science fiction
- Publisher: Lothrop Lee & Shepard
- Publication date: 1973
- Publication place: United States
- Media type: Print (Hardback)
- Pages: 159
- OCLC: 00672965
- Preceded by: 3000 Years of Fantasy and Science Fiction
- Followed by: Creatures of the Cosmos

Tales Beyond Time: From Fantasy to Science Fiction is an anthology of fantasy and science fiction short stories, edited by American writers L. Sprague de Camp and Catherine Crook de Camp. It was first published in hardcover by Lothrop Lee & Shepard in 1973, and in paperback by William Morrow; a large print edition followed from G. K. Hall & Co. in 1974. It was the second such anthology assembled by the de Camps, following their earlier 3000 Years of Fantasy and Science Fiction (1972).

The book collects ten tales by various authors, with an overall introduction and bibliography by the de Camps.

== Contents ==
- "Introduction: Yesterday, Tomorrow, and Maybe" (L. Sprague de Camp and Catherine Crook de Camp)
- "Icarus" (retold by Catherine Crook de Camp)
- "The Boy Who Found Fear" (collected by I. Kunos)
- "The Marvelous Powder of Life" (excerpted from The Land of Oz by L. Frank Baum)
- "The Sacred City of Cats" (excerpted from Time Cat by Lloyd Alexander)
- "The Shed" (E. Everett Evans)
- "Something Bright" (Zenna Henderson)
- "The Rocket Man" (E. W. Ludwig)
- "Native Son" (T. D. Hamm)
- "Playmate" (L. A. Croutch)
- "Robbie" (Isaac Asimov)
- "Longer Stories Too Good to Be Missed"

== Reception ==
Elizabeth Haynes in Library Journal notes that as an attempt "to introduce readers to fantasy and science fiction, ... this collection, intended for a younger age group then [sic] Asimov's Tomorrow's Children (Doubleday, 1966), will find a place in most collections." She notes that "[s]ome of the tales are tragic or sad, others are scary, and a few are fun. ... Most of the stories ... are not readily available in anthologies."

Mary Virginia Gaver in Instructor writes: "Adult in tone and yet sixth grade in reading level, this excellent collection should be popular with children; a brief bibliography of "Longer stories too good to be missed" is an excellent guide to further reading by teachers and children alike."

A brief review in Amra noted all the stories in the collection as "appropriate for introducing younger readers to the field."

Theodore Sturgeon, in The New York Times, likened the book to a similar volume of excerpts from juvenile novels from which he had once allowed children to select gift books. "The same sort of thing might well be done with TALES BEYOND TIME, ... and if it leads one to Lloyd Alexander and his priceless time cat Gareth (as only one example) it's a gift-giver's bonus.
