= Top Fantasy: The Authors' Choice =

- Dust cover of first edition, 1985
- Author: edited by Josh Pachter
- Language: English
- Series: Authors' Choice
- Genre: Fantasy
- Publisher: J. M. Dent
- Publication date: 1985
- Publication place: United Kingdom
- Media type: Print (hardcover)
- Pages: 311 pp.
- ISBN: 0-460-04659-4
- Preceded by: Top Horror: The Authors' Choice

Top Fantasy: The Authors' Choice is an anthology of fantasy short stories edited by Josh Pachter, the fourth in his series of "Authors' Choice" anthologies. It was first published in hardcover by J. M. Dent in June 1985, with a trade paperback edition issued by the same publisher in July 1986. The book has also been published in translation in Germany.

The book collects twenty-four short stories and novelettes by as many prominent fantasy authors, with the works included all selected and introduced by their authors as representative of their best short works. The stories were originally published in the magazines Ellery Queen's Mystery Magazine, Famous Fantastic Mysteries, The Magazine of Fantasy & Science Fiction, New Worlds SF, Rod Serling's The Twilight Zone Magazine, The Saturday Evening Post and Weird Tales, the fanzines Chacal, Dragonfields and Whispers, the anthologies The DAW Science Fiction Reader, Heroic Visions, Lands of Never, New Terrors, Quark/1, Rooms of Paradise, Science Fiction Tales, Speculations and Wandering Stars, and the collections The Compass Rose and Dark Companions. The book includes an introduction by the editor.

== Contents ==
- "Introduction" (Josh Pachter)
- "The Man Who Walked on Air" (Michael Avallone)
- "Report on an Unidentified Space Station" (J. G. Ballard)
- "The Ship of Disaster" (Barrington J. Bayley)
- "Collaborating" (Michael Bishop)
- "The Man Who Collected Poe" (Robert Bloch)
- "The Fog Horn" (Ray Bradbury)
- "The Day of the Butterflies" (Marion Zimmer Bradley)
- "The Depths" (Ramsey Campbell)
- "Touchstone" (Terry Carr)
- "Let Us Quickly Hasten to the Gate of Ivory" (Thomas M. Disch)
- "Trouble with Water" (Horace L. Gold)
- "Harpist" (Joe L. Hensley)
- "Blue Vase of Ghosts" (Tanith Lee)
- "The Wife's Story" (Ursula K. Le Guin)
- "The House of Cthulhu" (Brian Lumley)
- "The Real Shape of the Coast" (John Lutz)
- "The Smallest Dragonboy" (Anne McCaffrey)
- "Caves in Cliffs" (Josh Pachter)
- "The Broken Hoop" (Pamela Sargent)
- "Dancers in the Time-Flux" (Robert Silverberg)
- "Amends: A Tale of the Sun Kings" (Nancy Springer)
- "Sing a Last Song of Valdese" (Karl Edward Wagner)
- "The Father of the Bride" (Connie Willis)
- "Kevin Malone" (Gene Wolfe)
