= Elephant (de Camp book) =

1964 science book by L. Sprague de Camp

- Cover of Elephant
- Author: L. Sprague de Camp
- Cover artist: Paul Bacon
- Language: English
- Series: The Worlds of Science
- Subject: Zoology
- Publisher: Pyramid Books
- Publication date: 1964
- Publication place: United States
- Media type: Print (Paperback)
- Pages: vi, 179

Elephant is a science book by L. Sprague de Camp, published by Pyramid Books in July 1964 as part of The Worlds of Science series. The cover title is Elephant: The Fascinating Life Cycle of the World's Largest Land Animal.

== Summary ==
The book treats its subject comprehensively, covering elephants in captivity and the wild, their use in ancient warfare, modern conflicts between elephants and farmers, and preservation efforts, among other topics. A "generalized account of the life history of elephants, living and fossil, their relatives, and their use throughout history," it deals with "the various aspects of the world's largest land animal, from fossils to captive elephants." It is illustrated with pen-and-ink sketches, maps and charts, and includes eight pages of unnumbered black-and-white photographs, a bibliography and index.

== Reception ==
The Science News-Letter notes that the book is "[d]esigned for the general reader and student."

The Science Teacher praises the book's "academic and sometimes lighthearted text," noting "[t]he author has a knack for interjecting subtleties such as 'nobody has yet fitted an elephant with false teeth.'" It rates the book "an excellent junior high school library reference, especially for students who need a readable source for a class report."

== Relation to other works ==
While a decent study, the book is important more for its insight into the mind of the author than in its own right, elephants being a lifelong interest of de Camp's that figures in many of his other literary works. In his early time travel novel Lest Darkness Fall his protagonist Martin Padway pens a similar monograph, while in his historical novel An Elephant for Aristotle details the difficulties in transporting an elephant from India to Greece during ancient times. Two of his short stories imagine bringing back prehistoric Proboscidea from the Pleistocene with a time machine ("The Mislaid Mastodon") or actually resurrecting them through advanced technology ("Employment"). De Camp also wrote a number of articles about elephants, a few of which appeared, together with a chapter selected from the present work, in his later collection The Fringe of the Unknown (1983).
