= Get Off the Unicorn =

Collection of science fiction short stories by Anne McCaffrey

- First edition cover
- Author: Anne McCaffrey
- Cover artist: Paul Alexander
- Language: English
- Genre: Science fiction
- Publisher: Del Rey/Ballantine
- Publication date: June 1977
- Publication place: United States
- Media type: Print (paperback)
- Pages: xii, 303 pp.
- ISBN: 0-552-10965-7

Get Off the Unicorn is a collection of science fiction short stories by American writer Anne McCaffrey, first published in paperback by Del Rey Books in June 1977. Eleven of the fourteen stories were previously published in various magazines and anthologies. Initial sales were brisk; two additional printings were required by year's end. Del Rey reprinted Get off the Unicorn regularly throughout the 1970s and 1980s, and its edition remains in print as of 2015. Corgi issued a British edition in 1979 and an Australian edition in 1980. An audiobook based on the Corgi edition was released in 1985. Severn House issued a hardcover edition in 1982.

The title was derived by accident: McCaffrey's working title had been "Get of the Unicorn" but this was misprinted as "Get Off the Unicorn" in Ballantine roster of unfilled contracts. After McCaffrey's editor, Judy-Lynn del Rey, was repeatedly asked what "Get Off the Unicorn" was, del Rey asked McCaffrey what she could do about that theme.

== Contents ==
- "Lady in the Tower" (The Magazine of Fantasy & Science Fiction, April 1959)
- "A Meeting of Minds" (The Magazine of Fantasy & Science Fiction, January 1969)
- "Daughter" (The Many Worlds of Science Fiction, October 1971)
- "Dull Drums" (Future Quest, September 1973)
- "Changeling" (original to this collection)
- "Weather on Welladay" (Galaxy Science Fiction, March 1969)
- "The Thorns of Barevi" (The Disappearing Future: A Symposium of Speculation, 1970)
- "Horse from a Different Sea" (original to this collection)
- "The Great Canine Chorus" (Infinity One, January 1970)
- "Finder's Keeper" (The Haunt of Horror, August 1973)
- "A Proper Santa Claus" (Demon Kind, March 1973)
- "The Smallest Dragonboy" (Science Fiction Tales, 1973)
- "Apple" (Crime Prevention in the 30th Century, 1969)
- "Honeymoon" (original to this collection)

== Relation to McCaffrey's series ==
- "Lady in the Tower" was expanded to become The Rowan (1990) and "A Meeting of Minds" was incorporated into Damia (1992). Both books are part of McCaffrey's Tower and the Hive series.
- "Daughter" and "Dull Drums" share the character of Nora Fenn.
- A modified version of "The Thorns of Barevi" became the beginning of Freedom's Landing, the first book in the Catteni series.
- "The Smallest Dragonboy" is set on Pern at the time of the Ninth Pass and was later reprinted in A Gift of Dragons (2002).
- "Apple" is set in McCaffrey's Talents universe and was previously incorporated into To Ride Pegasus (1973).
- "Honeymoon" "ties up the loose end" of Helva & Niall's story (from The Ship Who Sang (1969))

== Reception ==
Evie Wilson and Michael McCue praised the collection, citing McCaffrey's introductory anecdotes as a highlight of the work. Others have commented that the collection's stories "demonstrate the limits of McCaffrey's range of emotions and subjects". McCaffrey biographer Robin Roberts wrote that the collection demonstrates McCaffrey's status in the field, showing "the power and appeal of [her] reputation as an author . . . [and] the power of her name to sell books". Duncan Lunan, however, reviewing the first hardcover edition for the Glasgow Herald, received the collection without enthusiasm; he was particularly critical of "The Smallest Dragonboy", declaring that "the grimness [of the Pern series] has gone, and the grandeur has gone along with it".
