= Dragonheart (novel) =

2008 novel by Todd McCaffrey

- Dragonheart
- Author: Todd McCaffrey
- Cover artist: Les Edwards (UK and US) (Note: Dragonheart title listing at the Internet Speculative Fiction Database lists cover artist Les Edwards for both UK and both US editions.)
- Language: English
- Series: Dragonriders of Pern
- Genre: Science fiction
- Publisher: Del Rey Books
- Publication date: 2008
- Publication place: United States
- Media type: Print (hardcover & paperback)
- Pages: 538 (hard editions)
- ISBN: 978-0-345-49114-5
- LC Class: PS3563.A25525 D73
- Preceded by: Dragon Harper
- Followed by: Dragongirl

Dragonheart is a science fiction novel by Todd McCaffrey in the Dragonriders of Pern series that his mother Anne McCaffrey initiated in 1967. Published by Del Rey Books in 2008, it was the second for Todd as sole author and the twenty-second in the series. Written after his first book, Dragonsblood, it is a concurrent-time book as opposed to a prequel or sequel.

The frame story of Dragonheart takes place in a few days of winter 508 AL (years After Landing on Pern), weeks after the beginning of the Third Pass and its attendant Threadfall.

== Synopsis ==
Pern is still trying to recover from a deadly plague that devastated the holders and craftsmen, not even 15 turns (years) before. Although the dragonriders and Weyrfolk were spared from the devastation of that plague, they are about to be tested with a deadly illness that afflicts the dragons.

Fiona of Fort Weyr, the only surviving child of Lord Holder Bemin of Fort Hold, is thrust into this situation when she accidentally impresses Gold Talenth. As first fire-lizards, and then dragons, fall prey to the mysterious illness, Fiona and all of Pern must face the possibility of no dragons being left to fight thread as it begins to fall once more.

The number of casualties mount as both the illness and thread take dragons and their riders. In an attempt to save the Weyrs, Fiona and a mysterious rider lead the injured and Weyrlings back in time.
