= Dragon's Fire =

2006 novel by Anne McCaffrey

- Youll cover of US editions (Note: Dragon's Fire title listing at the Internet Speculative Fiction Database lists cover artist Paul Youll for both US editions and Steve Weston for both UK editions.)
- Author: Anne and Todd McCaffrey
- Cover artist: Paul Youll; Steve Weston (UK)
- Language: English
- Series: Dragonriders of Pern
- Genre: Science fiction
- Publisher: Del Rey Books
- Publication date: 11 July 2006
- Publication place: United States
- Media type: Print (hardcover & paperback)
- Pages: 366 (hard editions)
- ISBN: 978-0-345-48028-6
- OCLC: 64453478
- Dewey Decimal: 813/.54 22
- LC Class: PS3563.A255 D775 2006
- Preceded by: Dragonsblood
- Followed by: Dragon Harper

Dragon's Fire is a science fiction novel by the American-Irish author Anne McCaffrey and her son Todd McCaffrey. Published in 2006, it is the twentieth book in the Dragonriders of Pern series that she initiated in 1967.

Dragon's Fire may be considered the second of a trilogy by the McCaffreys, between Dragon's Kin and Dragon Harper. Primarily the three books feature Kindan as a boy and young man, about 500 years after landing on Pern (500 AL). He is not the protagonist of Dragon's Fire, however, which is told from the viewpoints of three others in his generation, which are Cristov, Pellar, and Halla.

== Plot summary ==
Pellar's story provides background information related to the previous title Dragon's Kin. Cristov's story is mostly new material (blue firestone that survives in water) and takes place after the events in Pellar's. The focus of Cristov's story is the problem-laden transition from firestone to the phosphine-bearing rock that is used by later generations of dragons.

== Reception ==
Publishers Weekly commended the McCaffreys for shining the light on the risks of mining fossil fuels and slave labor while also maintaining a suitable atmosphere for young and older readerships alike.
