= The Girl Who Heard Dragons =

Book by Anne McCaffrey

- First edition cover
- Author: Anne McCaffrey
- Cover artist: Michael Whelan
- Language: English
- Genre: Science fiction
- Publisher: Tor Books
- Publication date: May 1994
- Publication place: United States
- Media type: Print (hardback & paperback)
- Pages: 352 pp.
- ISBN: 0-312-93173-5

The Girl Who Heard Dragons is a 1994 collection of short fantasy and science fiction stories by the American-Irish author Anne McCaffrey. It opens with an essay on her celebrity, or lack thereof, and includes 23 drawings by the cover artist Michael Whelan.

The title novella and cover story alone belongs to the Dragonriders of Pern series. It had previously been published as a fine book by Cheap Street and was later included in the all-Pern collection A Gift of Dragons. The story "Duty Calls", written for David Drake's The Fleet, also references previous McCaffrey series; a brainship and a Hrruban (from Decision at Doona) are the main characters. Two other McCaffrey stories in this collection, "A Sleeping Humpty Dumpty Beauty" and "The Mandalay Cure" are also from The Fleet series, while "The Bones Do Lie" and "A Flock of Geese" are also linked. Twelve of the fifteen stories were previously published in various magazines or anthologies; two were original to the collection. (Note: ISFDB Publication Listing links to full data on previous publication of eight stories, publication year 1986 alone for the title novella, and none for five stories that it marks "1995" (sic), implying that the works are original to the collection. Three of those five stories were previously published.)

The Girl Who Heard Dragons does not include bibliographic data on previous publication of the collected stories and provides any annotation for only one of them, "The Greatest Love" (written in 1956).

== Contents ==
- "So You're Anne McCaffrey" (original non-fiction essay)
- "The Girl Who Heard Dragons" (Cheap Street Press, 1986)
- "Velvet Fields" (Worlds of If, Nov/Dec 1973)
- "Euterpe on a Fling" (original to the collection)
- "Duty Calls" (The Fleet, May 1988)
- "A Sleeping Humpty Dumpty Beauty" (Sworn Allies, March 1990)
- "The Mandalay Cure" (as "Mandalay", September 1990)
- "A Flock of Geese" (Moonsinger's Friends, June 1985)
- "The Greatest Love" (Futurelove: A Science Fiction Triad, May 1977 (written in 1956))
- "A Quiet One" (2041: Twelve Short Stories About the Future by Top Science Fiction Writers, September 1991)
- "If Madam Likes You..." (New Destinies, Volume VIII / Fall 1989, September 1989)
- "Zulei, Grace, Nimshi and the Damnyankees" (World Fantasy Convention 1992 Program Book, October 1992)
- "Cinderella Switch" (Stellar #6: Science-Fiction Stories, January 1981)
- "Habit Is an Old Horse" (Visitor's Book, 1979)
- "Lady-in-Waiting" (Cassandra Rising, August 1978)
- "The Bones Do Lie" (original to the collection, written in the 1970's for Harlan Ellison's The Last Dangerous Visions)
