= The Virgin & the Wheels =

1976 collection of short science fiction novels by L. Sprague de Camp

- first edition of The Virgin & the Wheels
- Author: L. Sprague de Camp
- Cover artist: Don Maitz
- Language: English
- Genre: Science fiction
- Publisher: Popular Library
- Publication date: 1976
- Publication place: United States
- Media type: Print (hardback)
- Pages: 191 pp

The Virgin & the Wheels is a collection of two short science fiction novels by L. Sprague de Camp, published in paperback by Popular Library in 1976. An E-book edition was published by Gollancz's SF Gateway imprint on September 29, 2011 as part of a general release of de Camp's works in electronic form.

== Contents ==
=== The Virgin of Zesh ===
Originally published in Thrilling Wonder Stories, February 1953. Earth missionary Althea Merrick, stranded on the planet Krishna and fleeing from an unwanted marriage to a Viagens Interplanetarias official, joins a scientist and poet en route to a utopian Terran colony on the island of Zesh. There she becomes embroiled in the affairs of some peculiarly intelligent aborigines. The story satirizes contemporary pseudoscientific movements and has some parallels to Daniel Keyes's novel Flowers for Algernon, which it predates.

=== The Wheels of If ===
Originally published in Unknown, October 1940. Lawyer Alister Park is inexplicably torn from his normal existence and thrust into a series of alternate worlds. Each morning he discovers he has become someone else, in a world changed from his own. Ultimately he finds himself a bishop in Vinland, an America that might have been had the early Anglo-Saxons converted to Celtic Christianity and the Franks lost the Battle of Tours. The displacement of his consciousness turns out to have been incidental to a plot directed against his other self, Bishop Scoglund, whose campaign to extend civil rights to Vinland's native inhabitants, the Skraelings, has aroused opposition. To get home Park must continue his counterpart's struggle while somehow unraveling the mystery of how to reunite the minds of all his selves with their proper realities.
