= Restoree =

1967 science fiction novel by Anne McCaffrey

- First edition
- Author: Anne McCaffrey
- Cover artist: Brothers Hildebrandt
- Language: English language
- Genre: Science fiction
- Publisher: Ballantine Books
- Publication date: September 1967
- Publication place: United States
- Media type: Print (paperback original; hardcover UK)
- Pages: 252 (first)
- ISBN: 0-345-25744-8 (March 1977)
- OCLC: 11204693

Restoree (1967) is a science fiction novel by American-Irish writer Anne McCaffrey, her first published book. It is the story of a young woman who survives being abducted by aliens and finds a new life on another planet.

Betty Ballantine edited Restoree which initiated a long relationship between McCaffrey and Ballantine Books, and later its science fiction imprint Del Rey Books.

== Origin ==
Restoree features "an intelligent, survivor-type woman" as a "once-off jab at the way women were portrayed in science-fiction". While always reading about women cowering in a corner, awaiting rescue by the hero, McCaffrey objected that she would have been in the fighting herself.

== Plot summary ==
Restoree is the story of Sara, an introverted, beak-nosed, 24-year-old virginal librarian originally from near Seaford, Delaware, who is abducted from New York City by the Mil, amorphous alien creatures that eat human flesh. She is kept alive, with her skin removed and in a catatonic state from the physical and mental shock, on a meat hook as a Mil meal until the alien ship she is on is captured by human inhabitants of the planet Lothar. Without her skin, some Lotharians mistake her for one of their own and perform controversial "restoration" procedures on her, including a nose job.

Sara comes to her senses in a mental institution on Lothar with no memory of what happened, little knowledge of the local language, and a beautiful, golden-skinned body. At the institution, she is treated as if she were retarded and given menial tasks to do, as are other "restorees" who have been clandestinely salvaged from Mil ships; it is apparently some factor of Sara's Terran origins that allows her to fully recover from the shock of the Mil ordeal, while Lotharian restorees are of limited intellect at best. One of her jobs is to care for Harlan, the deposed planetary regent, who is being drugged into a moronic state. Recognizing what is being done, Sara helps Harlan to regain his senses and escape the mental institution. Sara and Harlan then gain the advantage over Harlan's political enemies, defeat the Mil, solve some of Lothar's emerging domestic problems and, of course, fall in love.

== Reception ==
Mary T. Brizzi calls it "unique among science fiction novels", with "shallow histrionics of characterization", "Harlequin Romance stereotypes", "improbable reactions of heroes and villains alike", "inconsistencies of plot", and a "saccharine" and "melodramatic" heroine, but emphasizes that, when "read as parody", it is funny.
