= Alternative Histories =

Short story series by Charles Waugh and Martin Greenberg

- Dust cover of first edition
- Editors: Charles G. Waugh, Martin H. Greenberg
- Cover artist: M. C. Escher
- Language: English
- Series: Garland Reference Library of the Humanities no. 623
- Genre: Alternate history short stories
- Publisher: Garland Publishing
- Publication date: 1986
- Publication place: United States
- Media type: Print (Hardcover)
- Pages: 363 pp
- ISBN: 0-8240-8659-7
- OCLC: 13333538

Alternative Histories : Eleven Stories of the World as It Might Have Been is an anthology of alternate history short stories, edited by Charles G. Waugh and Martin H. Greenberg. It was first published in hardcover by Garland Publishing in December 1986.

== Summary ==
The book collects eleven novellas, novelettes and short stories by various authors, together with an afterword by Gordon B. Chamberlain and a bibliography by Chamberlain and Barton C. Hacker.

== Contents ==
- "Hands Off" (1881) (Edward Everett Hale)
- "Delenda Est" (1955) (Poul Anderson)
- "The Wheels of If" (1940) (L. Sprague de Camp)
- "In the Circle of Nowhere" (1954) (Irving E. Cox, Jr.)
- "The Lady Margaret" (1968) (Keith Roberts)
- "He Walked Around the Horses" (1948) (H. Beam Piper)
- "Custer's Last Jump" (1976) (Steven Utley) and f(Howard Waldrop)
- "The Curfew Tolls" (1935) (Stephen Vincent Benét)
- "Hush My Mouth" (1986) (Suzette Haden Elgin)
- "Interurban Queen" (1970) (R. A. Lafferty)
- "The Lucky Strike" (1984) (Kim Stanley Robinson)
- "Afterword: Alt History in Science Fiction" (Gordon B. Chamberlain)
- "Pasts That Might Have Been, II: A Revised Bibliography of Alternative History" (Gordon B. Chamberlain) and (Barton C. Hacker)
