= Science-Fiction Handbook =

1953 guide to writing and marketing science fiction and fantasy by L. Sprague de Camp

- Dust-jacket of first edition
- Author: L. Sprague de Camp
- Language: English
- Subject: Writing
- Publisher: Hermitage House
- Publication date: 1953
- Publication place: United States
- Media type: Print (Hardback)
- Pages: 328 pp

Science-Fiction Handbook, subtitled The Writing of Imaginative Fiction, is a guide to writing and marketing science fiction and fantasy by L. Sprague de Camp, "one of the earliest books about modern sf." The original edition was published in hardcover by Hermitage House in 1953 as a volume in its Professional Writers Library series. A revised edition, by L. Sprague de Camp and Catherine Crook de Camp, titled Science Fiction Handbook, Revised, was published in hardcover by Owlswick Press in 1975 and as a trade paperback by McGraw-Hill in 1977. An E-book version of the revised edition was published by Gollancz's SF Gateway imprint on April 30, 2014.

== Summary ==
The book comprises a comprehensive guide explaining how to write and market science fiction and fantasy. Peripheral subjects such as lecturing and bookkeeping are also discussed, and a short history of the field of imaginative fiction is included. The revised version excised outdated material, updated the historical section, and added more information on the business and records-keeping end of being a writer.

== Contents ==
Original edition (1953)	Revised edition (1975)
A Note on the Professional Writers Library	
Preface	Preface
The World of Imaginative Fiction	The World of Imaginative Fiction
The Origins of Imaginative Fiction	
Modern Imaginative Fiction	Modern Imaginative Fiction
Markets and Editors	Editors and Publishers
Readers and Fans	Readers and Writers
Writers of Imaginative Fiction	
Preparation for a Science-Fiction Career	Preparing for a Science-Fiction Career
Where do You Get Those Crazy Ideas?	Those Crazy Ideas
Plotting an Imaginative Story	Plotting an Imaginative Story
Writing an Imaginative Story	Writing an Imaginative Story
Selling an Imaginative Story	Selling an Imaginative Story
	The Business Side of Writing
Being an Imaginative-Fiction Writer	And When You Have Arrived
Notes	Notes
Bibliography	Bibliography
Index	Index

== Reception ==
Groff Conklin of Galaxy Science Fiction praised the book, stating that it was "Recommended even for people who don't want to write". Alexei and Cory Panshin praised the original edition as "a marvelous and ungainly book . . . a stewpot of everything De Camp could imagine a writer of SF needing to know." However, reviewing the revised edition, they declared that "A venerable classic has been consistently simplified, softened and trivialized" and concluded that what remained "was not adequate to the problems of writing contemporary SF." Malcolm Edwards and John Clute called it "a useful compendium of information and advice for aspiring writers in its original edition, [though] it gained little from its subsequent revision – indeed, the revised version omitted some material of interest."

== Awards ==
In 2004 the original edition was among the nominees for the 1954 Retro-Hugo Award for Best Related Book.
