= Dragongirl =

2010 novel by Todd McCaffrey

- Author: Todd McCaffrey
- Cover artist: Les Edwards (Note: Dragongirl title listing at the Internet Speculative Fiction Database lists 464pp and no cover artist. Page numbers in the first US hardcover run to 482 without padding, and there is preliminary material. The jacket identifies cover artist Les Edwards.)
- Language: English
- Series: Dragonriders of Pern
- Genre: Science fiction
- Publisher: Del Rey Books
- Publication date: July 2010
- Publication place: United States
- Media type: Print (hardcover & paperback)
- Pages: 482
- ISBN: 978-0-345-49116-9
- Dewey Decimal: 813'.54—dc22
- LC Class: PS3563.A25525 D68
- Preceded by: Dragonheart
- Followed by: Dragon's Time

Dragongirl is a science fiction novel by Todd McCaffrey in the Dragonriders of Pern series that his mother Anne McCaffrey initiated in 1967. Published in 2010, it is the sequel to Dragonheart and third with Todd as sole author.

== Plot overview ==
Dragongirl is set primarily during a few months of year 508 AL (After Landing on Pern), beginning weeks after the start of the "Third Pass" of the Red Star and its attendant Threadfall. Primarily it continues the story of gold dragonrider Fiona of Fort and the people she leads. In broad terms, it continues the history of the crisis that the start of every Pass brings to Pern, the third such crisis.

== Plot summary ==
Until nearly the end of Dragonheart, Fiona had been a very young Weyrwoman in the past, during a long episode of time travel. She had led a large group of young dragons and young dragonriders with the primary purpose simply to survive and to mature in the relative safety of the past. This worked, and so they gained the force needed for the Pernese to handle the current crisis. Upon return from the past, Fiona is no longer Weyrwoman, but has gained experience and the favor of those she travelled with.

Early in Dragongirl, the entire force of centrally located Telgar Weyr is lost to a sudden disaster, resulting in loss of all its mature dragons and dragonriders, about 300 pairs. That leaves only the support population, with almost no adult men, and some of the young, retired, or sick. Fiona's group of recent travelers is transferred to Telgar, among others, and she is Weyrwoman again.

Following the plague that had decimated the dragons, and the loss of an entire Weyr, the remaining dragons are overstretched, and the limited numbers lead to even further casualties. The novel follows Fiona, now as Weyrwoman of Telgar, as the dragonriders come to realize that there are no longer enough dragons to protect the planet for the whole Pass.

== Reception ==
Critical reception for Dragongirl has been mixed, with SF Crowsnest saying that McCaffrey has developed as an author but that the writing still felt inexperienced and hurried at the end. Publishers Weekly positively reviewed the book, writing that "McCaffrey's assured characterizations and ease with referencing Pern's elaborate history make this a hardy fantasy that faithfully echoes and builds upon his mother's original vision".
