= Catteni =

Science fiction novel series

- Freedom's Landing (1995); Freedom's Choice (1996); Freedom's Challenge (1998); Freedom's Ransom (2002)
- Author: Anne McCaffrey
- Genre: Science fiction
- No. of books: 4

The Catteni series (also called the Freedom series) is a tetralogy of science fiction novels by American writer Anne McCaffrey. In this universe, humans are slaves of aliens, the humanoid Catteni. Woven through all four of the books are details of the relationship between Kristin Bjornsen, a former slave, and Zainal, a renegade Catteni.

The Catteni series consists of the following books: Freedom's Landing (1995), Freedom's Choice (1996), Freedom's Challenge (1998), and Freedom's Ransom (2002).

== Story ==
The initial story about the Catteni preceded the books by many years. The Thorns of Barevi first appeared in 1970 (and is included in the collection Get Off the Unicorn, 1977). A human female, Kristin Bjornsen, escapes slavery, but unlike others before her, she resourcefully evades capture for months, but a Catteni gets injured nearby, and helping him betrays her fugitive existence. This story was modified and included as the beginning of the Freedom's Landing novel.

In Freedom's Landing, the Catteni routinely round up human troublemakers and drop them on empty planets – if they survive, the world is suitable for their own people. Kristin is included in such a group, which is dropped on a world they name Botany (after the Australian destination for transportees, Botany Bay). Surprisingly, a Catteni noble, Zainal, is among their group, the same one Kristin helped earlier. While trying to cope with their new situation, they discover the existence of another alien race that is using the planet as a gigantic farm. Kristin is at first the only one to vouch for Zainal but he soon proves his usefulness to the rest of the improvised colony. They steal technology from the mechanisms that are used to farm the planet Botany. She and Zainal fall in love.

In Freedom's Choice, the humans begin to create a real colony, a community that can support itself. They also attempt to contact the aliens farming the planet, hoping to receive information about them, their origins, and possible help against the Catteni. The colonists also learn that the Catteni are not the real enemies: they are being dominated and controlled by another race, the Eosi.

In Freedom's Challenge, having discovered that the Catteni are dominated by another alien species, the Eosi, the colonists lead an effort to rescue the families of some of the dissident Catteni from the Eosi-controlled world Catten and create a rebellion against the Eosi to free not only Catten, but also Earth and every other planet and colony controlled by the Eosi.

Freedom's Ransom deals with the aftermath of the rebellion. Starting on Botany, then to Earth, then to Barevi, Zainal conceives of a complex trade relationship that will benefit the humans, the Catteni, and their other alien allies. Among the things they trade are coffee and dentistry. They need the vast amount of supplies looted from Terra.

== Comments ==
The original short story, "The Thorns of Barevi" (1970), had a rape-fantasy component that was removed when it was reworked into the first novel, Freedom's Landing. McCaffrey wrote:

"The Thorns of Barevi" was an attempt to cash in on the lucrative market for soft- and hard-core pornography in the 60's. The market paid well for such stories and many science fiction writers earned their monthly rent from such submissions. I thought I'd give it a try. I didn't really succeed there. But there were seeds in the short story that could eventually germinate a full novel about the modus operandi of the Catteni in subjugating a planet and its inhabitants. But I haven't written that one yet, either.
