= The Tower of Zanid =

1958 novel by Lyon Sprague de Camp

- First edition
- Author: L. Sprague de Camp
- Cover artist: Ric Binkley
- Language: English
- Series: Krishna
- Genre: Science fiction
- Publisher: Avalon
- Publication date: 1958
- Publication place: United States
- Media type: Print (Hardcover)
- Preceded by: The Bones of Zora
- Followed by: The Swords of Zinjaban

The Tower of Zanid is a science fiction novel by American writer L. Sprague de Camp, the sixth book of his Viagens Interplanetarias series and the fourth of its subseries of stories set on the fictional planet Krishna. Chronologically it is the seventh Krishna novel. It was first published in the magazine Science Fiction Stories for May 1958. It was first published in book form in hardcover by Avalon Books, also in 1958, and in paperback by Airmont Books in 1963. It has been reissued a number of times since by various publishers. For the later standard edition of Krishna novels it was published together with The Virgin of Zesh in the paperback collection The Virgin of Zesh & The Tower of Zanid by Ace Books in 1983. An E-book edition was published by Gollancz's SF Gateway imprint on September 29, 2011 as part of a general release of de Camp's works in electronic form. The novel has also been translated into Italian and German.

The Tower of Zanid was de Camp's last Krishna novel for a quarter century, the next one (The Hostage of Zir) not appearing until 1977.

As with all of the "Krishna" novels, the title of The Tower of Zanid has a "Z" in it, a practice de Camp claimed to have devised to keep track of them. Short stories in the series do not follow the practice, nor do Viagens Interplanetarias works not set on Krishna.

== Plot summary ==
Anthony Fallon, the Terran deposed as king of the Krishnan island of Zamba in the earlier novel The Queen of Zamba, has fallen on hard times, having failed to regain his throne and lost his second wife Julnar as well. Currently he resides in Zanid, capital of the kingdom of Balhib, where he makes a precarious living as a city guardsman and spy for the nomad realm of Qaath.

Fallon's life is made more complicated when Terran consul Percy Mjipa enlists him to help archaeologist Julian Fredro study the Safq, an ancient snail-shaped tower forbidden to all but members of the native Yeshite cult. Fallon is also to look into recent disappearances of Terran scientists in the region. Mjipa, introduced in this novel as a secondary character, would go on to appear in three other Krishna novels; the chronologically earlier The Hostage of Zir and The Prisoner of Zhamanak (the latter as the protagonist), and the chronologically later The Swords of Zinjaban.

Balancing Fallon's mutually exclusive allegiances while continuing to work toward recovering his kingdom is a difficult undertaking, which he realizes could prove fatal–particularly when the Safq turns out to be hosting a secret project to reproduce Terran weaponry as a secret weapon for the war with Qaath. Then in the climactic battle the Qaathians unleash their own secret weapon, designed and built by the captive scientists. In the ensuing chaos Fallon figures the best thing to do is cut and run with the proceeds of his espionage, only to be undone by the fallout of a rare good deed, his earlier rescue of missionary Welcome Wagner.

Anthony Fallon would reappear, reformed, in the later Krishna novel The Swords of Zinjaban as a Terran official.

== Setting ==
The planet Krishna is de Camp's premier creation in the Sword and Planet genre, representing both a tribute to the Barsoom novels of Edgar Rice Burroughs and an attempt to "get it right", reconstructing the concept logically, without what he regarded as Burroughs' biological and technological absurdities. De Camp intended the stories as "pure entertainment in the form of light, humorous, swashbuckling, interplanetary adventure-romances - a sort of sophisticated Burroughs-type story, more carefully thought out than their prototypes."

As dated in the 1959 version of de Camp's essay "The Krishna Stories" and James Cambias's GURPS Planet Krishna (a 1997 gaming guide to the Viagens series authorized by de Camp), the action of The Virgin of Zesh takes place in the year 2168 AD., falling between The Bones of Zora and The Swords of Zinjaban, and making it the eleventh story set on Krishna in terms of chronology.

== Reception ==
P. Schuyler Miller called the book "a back-handed sequel to 'The Queen of Zamba,'" noting that its hero "was the rather off-stage villain of the earlier book." He finds it "fun, but it would be a better book and even more fun except for the author's ingrown integrity," because of which "[t]he languages, titles and names of the various races are worked out to the last detail, with proper attention for dialect, and the resulting jawbreakers are pretty hard to remember, the translation into English is deliberately awkward-sounding, and there isn't quite enough zing in the book to be worth the trouble." Comparing it to Rogue Queen, which he considers "the masterpiece of the Viagens series," he notes that "[t]his isn't." Later, commenting on the Airmont paperback reprint, he sums it up as a "Viagens adventure yarn" in which a "typical de Campian reluctant hero attempt[ing] to become a king on Krishna."

Floyd C. Gale, noting that "De Camp can buckle a swash with the best," characterizes it as "an inverse success story, or riches to rags on Krishna," as de Camp's "unsavory Earthman hero ... goes through amusing anguish trying to regain his crown."

== Sources ==
- Cambias, James (1997). GURPS Planet Krishna. Steve Jackson Games.
- De Camp, L. Sprague. "The Krishna Stories " (Essay, in New Frontiers, v. 1, no. 1, Dec. 1959, page 6)
- Laughlin, Charlotte; Daniel J. H. Levack (1983). De Camp: An L. Sprague de Camp Bibliography. San Francisco: Underwood/Miller. pp. 96–97.

Preceded by The Bones of Zora	Krishna tales of L. Sprague de Camp; The Tower of Zanid	Succeeded by The Swords of Zinjaban
