= Dragon's Kin =

2003 novel by Anne McCaffrey

- Youll cover of US editions (Note: Dragon's Kin title listing at the Internet Speculative Fiction Database lists cover artist Paul Youll for all US editions, and also for Les Edwards (UK), two ISBN.)
- Author: Anne and Todd McCaffrey
- Cover artist: Paul Youll; Les Edwards (UK)
- Language: English
- Series: Dragonriders of Pern
- Genre: Science fiction
- Publisher: Del Rey Books
- Publication date: November 2003
- Publication place: United States
- Media type: Print (hardcover & paperback)
- Pages: 292 (first hardcovers)
- ISBN: 978-0-345-46198-8
- OCLC: 53447747
- Dewey Decimal: 813/.6 22
- LC Class: PS3563.A255 D78 2003
- Preceded by: The Skies of Pern
- Followed by: Dragonsblood

Dragon's Kin is a science fiction novel by the American-Irish author Anne McCaffrey and her son Todd McCaffrey. Published by Del Rey Books in 2003, it is the eighteenth book in the Dragonriders of Pern series and the first with Todd as co-author.

Dragon's Kin may be considered the first of a trilogy by the McCaffreys, preceding Dragon's Fire and Dragon Harper. Primarily the three books feature Kindan as a boy and young man, about 500 years after landing on Pern (500 AL).

== Collaboration ==
Anne McCaffrey created Pern in the novella Weyr Search (1967) when her second child Todd was eleven. In 2001 and 2002 she published her fifteenth Pern novel and second collection of short stories. Dragon's Kin was their first collaborative work.

Todd later recalled that a Del Rey editor in the 1990s suggested to him that someone should continue Anne's legacy when she could no longer write the series, also saying that he had no story ideas at the time.

Previously, as Todd Johnson, he had contributed the chapter "Training and Fighting Dragons" to The Dragonlover's Guide to Pern (1989). Mother and son had also discussed Pern and its setting for years, and she had suggested that he "writes the military science fiction prequels" to the colonization, but that never progressed far.

They co-authored four Pern novels and, as of December 2011, Todd has done three alone. All are set just before and during the "Third Pass", about 500 years after human settlement on Pern and 2000 years before the "Ninth Pass" events chronicled in most of Anne McCaffrey's Pern books.

== Plot summary ==
Dragon's Kin tells how the people of the planet Pern discover the special abilities of the watch-whers or whers, a distant relative of the dragons. Subsequently, these beasts are used in mines to warn miners of gas pockets and also to locate stranded miners, should there be a cave-in.

The story begins some years before the 3rd Pass in Camp Natalon, a mining camp. There, the reader is introduced to a young boy Kindan, whose father owns a watch-wher called Dask. During a mining cave-in, Kindan loses his entire family as well as Dask, and is adopted by the Master Harper Zist, who begins to train him to be both an entertainer and a spy, something that Harpers do. This is how Kindan learns that the camp is divided into two parties, Natalon's and his uncle Tarik's.

Meanwhile, the camp is without a watch-wher and minor accidents keep delaying the work. Despite the protests from Tarik and his group, Natalon decides to trade an entire winter's worth of coal for a chance for Kindan to ask a queen watch-wher for an egg. He succeeds and begins the difficult task of raising a nocturnal animal. As no records exist on how to raise or train the watch-wher, Kindan has no clue but is luckily aided by the mysterious Nuella. Together, they train Kisk and, in the process, learn a great deal about this species. This proves to be vital as, towards the end of the novel, Kisk's abilities will save many lives, including that of the camp leader, Natalon.

== Sources ==
- McCaffrey, Todd (1999). Dragonholder: The Life and Dreams (So Far) of Anne McCaffrey by her son. New York: Ballantine Books. ISBN 978-0-345-42217-0.
- Nye, Jody Lynn (1989). The Dragonlover's Guide to Pern. With Anne McCaffrey. New York: Ballantine Books. ISBN 978-0-345-35424-2.
