= Gerald W. Johnson (writer) =

American writer (1890–1980)

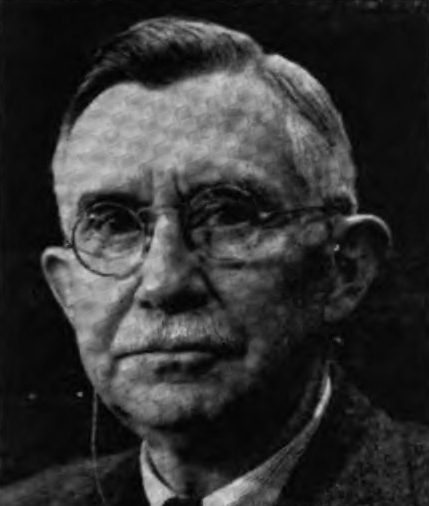
- Born: 1890; Riverton, North Carolina, USA
- Died: March 22, 198; Baltimore, Maryland, USA
- Education: Wake Forest College (1910)
- Occupations: Journalist, editor, essayist, historian, biographer, and novelist
- Spouse: Kathryn Hayward
- Children: 2
- Writing career
- Notable work: America Is Born (1959)
- Notable awards: Alfred I. duPont–Columbia University Award (1952); Peabody Award (1953); The Hillman Prize (1953)

Gerald White Johnson (1890 – March 22, 1980) was an American journalist, editor, essayist, historian, biographer, and novelist. Over his career spanning more than seven decades, he was known for being "one of the most eloquent spokespersons for America's adversary culture." Johnson was an editorial writer for the Baltimore "Sunpapers" for nearly 20 years, a weekly columnist for The New Republic for 26 years, and the author of more than 30 books on American culture and politics. He wrote mystery novels under the pen name of Charles North.

== Life and career ==
Johnson was born in Riverton, North Carolina, the son of an editor of a Baptist magazine. He graduated from Wake Forest College in 1910.

During World War I, he was a member of the American Expeditionary Force. He was the first professor of journalism at the University of North Carolina. While there he published the first of many books, The Story of Man's Work, a defense of liberal capitalism. He opposed the anti-evolution movement during the "Monkey Trial" era.

Johnson worked for The Evening Sun of Baltimore from 1926 to 1943, when he retired to write for magazines and to concentrate on writing books.

In 1949 he served as the honorary chairman of a committee that advocated against loyalty oaths and in 1950 published an article in Harper's called "Why Communists are Valuable."

Johnson provided broadcast commentary in Baltimore for a few years in the 1950s.

He wrote many works on topics in American history, beginning with Andrew Jackson: An Epic in Homespun (1927).

He was a friend, colleague and protege of H. L. Mencken, although their philosophies differed.

He married Kathryn Hayward and they had two daughters. He died in Baltimore on March 22, 1980.

== Works ==
- Andrew Jackson An Epic in Homespun (New York: Balch & Co., 1927)
- The Undefeated (New York: Minton, Balch & Co., 1927). A book about Mount Rushmore sculptor Gutzon Borglum's role in designing the Stone Mountain memorial in Georgia.
- Randolph of Roanoke: A Political Fantastic (New York: Minton, Balch & Co., 1929)
- By Reason of Strength (New York: Minton, Balch & Co., 1930)
- Number Thirty-Six (New York: Minton, Balch & Co., 1933)
- The Secession of the Southern States (New York: G. P. Putnam’s Sons, 1933)
- A Little Night-Music (New York: Harper & Brothers, 1937)
- The Sunpapers of Baltimore (1937)
- The Wasted Land (Chapel Hill: University of North Carolina Press, 1937)
- America's Silver Age: The Statecraft of Clay–Webster–Calhoun (New York, London: Harper & Bros., 1939)
- Roosevelt: Dictator or Democrat? (New York, London: Harper & Bros., 1941)
- American Heroes and Hero-Worship (New York: Harper & Brothers, 1943)
- Woodrow Wilson: The Unforgettable Figure who has Returned to Haunt Us(New York: Harper & Brothers, 1944)
- An Honorable Titan: A Biographical Study of Adolph S. Ochs (New York: Harper & Brothers, 1946)
- The First Captain: The Story of John Paul Jones. (New York: Coward-McCann, 1947)
- Liberal’s Progress (New York: Coward-McCann, 1948)
- Our English Heritage (Philadelphia: J.B. Lippincott, 1949)
- Incredible Tale: The Odyssey of the Average American in the Last Half Century (New York: Harper & Bros., 1950)
- This American People (New York: Harper & Bros., 1951)
- The Making of a Southern Industrialist: A Biographical Study of Simpson Bobo Tanner (Chapel Hill: University of North Carolina Press, 1952)
- Patterns for Liberty: The Story of Old Philadelphia (New York: McGraw-Hill, 1952)
- Mount Vernon: The Story of a Shrine (New York: Random House, 1953)
- The Lunatic Fringe (Philadelphia: Lippincott, 1957)
- The Lines are Drawn: American Life since the First World War as Reflected in the Pulitzer Prize Cartoons (Philadelphia: Lippincott, 1958)
- Peril and Promise (New York: Harper, 1958)
- America Is Born: A History for Peter (New York: Morrow, 1959)
- America Grows Up: A History for Peter (New York: Morrow, 1960)
- America Moves Forward: A History for Peter (New York: Morrow, 1960)
- The Man Who Feels Left Behind (New York: Morrow, 1961)
- The Presidency (New York: Morrow, 1962)
- The Supreme Court (New York: Morrow, 1962)
- The Congress (New York: Morrow, 1963)
- Communism: An American's View (New York: Morrow, 1964)
- Hod-Carrier: Notes of a Laborer on an Unfinished Cathedral (New York: Morrow, 1964)
- The Cabinet (New York: William Morrow, 1966)
- Franklin D. Roosevelt: Portrait of a Great Man (New York: William Morrow, 1967)
- The British Empire: An American View of its History from 1776 to 1945 (Morrow, 1969)
- The Imperial Republic: Speculations on the Future, If Any, of the Third U.S.A. (New York: Liveright, 1972)
- America-watching: Perspectives in the course of an incredible century (1976)
- South-Watching: Selected Essays (Chapel Hill: University of North Carolina Press, 1983)

== Accolades ==
In 1952 Johnson received the Alfred I. duPont Award. In 1953, Johnson received the Peabody Award and The Hillman Prize.
