= Cheap Street Press =

American publishing company

Cheap Street Press was an American small publishing company started up in 1980 and operated by the husband-wife duo, George and Jan O'Nale, in their rural home near New Castle, Virginia. Cheap Street concentrated on publishing limited edition books, signed and numbered, of science fiction and fantasy works. Their books were hand-printed letterpress by George on fine (often handmade) paper and hand-bound in fine cloth and leather with matching drop-back boxes.

Their books were typically issued in editions of 50 to 200 copies, and sold for up to $250 each. They approached authors who they identified for excellence in writing quality.

George and Jan O'Nale were hermitic in their habits, living in a fairly unpopulated area in the Virginian countryside. In 2002, the O'Nales donated their collection of books and press materials to Tulane University, and then committed suicide in the spring of 2003, citing increasing health problems.

A sampling of books published by Cheap Street Press:

- At the Double Solstice by Gregory Benford
- Paperjack by Charles de Lint
- Torturing Mr. Amberwell by Thomas M. Disch
- The Adventures of Cobble's Rune by Ursula K. Le Guin
- The Beautiful Biting Machine by Tanith Lee
- Ervool by Fritz Leiber
- The Girl Who Heard Dragons by Anne McCaffrey
- Red Noise by John Sladek
- Flying Saucer Rock and Roll by Howard Waldrop
- The Arimaspian Legacy by Gene Wolfe
- On Saint Hubert's Thing by Chelsea Quinn Yarbro
- A Rhapsody in Amber by Roger Zelazny

Other items published by Cheap Street Press:

- Pamphlet: The Complete Twelve Hours of the Night by "William Ashbless", a pen name for James Blaylock and Tim Powers.
