= Dragonsblood =

2005 novel by Todd McCaffrey

- Edwards cover of all editions (Note: Dragonsblood title listing at the Internet Speculative Fiction Database lists cover artist Les Edwards for both UK and both US print editions.)
- Author: Todd McCaffrey
- Cover artist: Les Edwards (UK and US)
- Language: English
- Series: Dragonriders of Pern
- Genre: Science fiction
- Publisher: Del Rey Books
- Publication date: 25 January 2005
- Publication place: United States
- Media type: Print (hardcover & paperback)
- Pages: 448
- ISBN: 978-0-345-44124-9
- OCLC: 55960881
- Dewey Decimal: 813/.6 22
- LC Class: PS3613.C343 D73 2005
- Preceded by: Dragon's Kin
- Followed by: Dragon's Fire

Dragonsblood is a science fiction novel by Todd McCaffrey in the Dragonriders of Pern series that his mother Anne McCaffrey initiated in 1967. Published in 2005, this was the first with Todd as sole author and the nineteenth in the series.

== Collaboration ==
Todd's solo contribution followed two years after the first published collaboration between mother and son, Dragon's Kin. Although set only a decade later, Dragonsblood is not a sequel. During the next few years, the McCaffreys co-wrote two sequels to their Dragon's Kin and Todd completed two sequels to his Dragonsblood. (Note: Todd later recalled that a Del Rey editor in the 1990s "pitched it to me that someone ought to continue Mum's legacy when she was no longer able. At the time I had misgivings and no story ideas. Then, one night, I woke up with a dream, a very bad poem — and the outline for Dragonsblood". • McCaffrey, Todd (24 January 2001). "Which do you find to be the better route to selling your first novel, approaching publishers yourself or finding an agent?". Pern Home.)

== Plot overview ==
All of Todd's novels are set just before or at the beginning of the "Third Pass", about 500 years after human settlement on Pern (500 AL, "After Landing") and 2000 years before the "Ninth Pass" events chronicled in most of Anne McCaffrey's Pern books.

Dragonsblood features an epidemic that strikes fire-lizards, probably first, and dragons (reptiloids). The people of Pern have regressed since its settlement by colonists from Earth and have already lost the knowledge and equipment to handle such a bio-medical crisis.

In Moreta: Dragonlady of Pern (1983) and Nerilka's Story (1985), Anne McCaffrey had featured a plague that decimates humans and apparently passes among mammals. That happened 1000 years later in Pern history.

== Plot summary ==
Occasional chapters of Dragonsblood are set soon after the end of the First Pass of the Red Star, nearly 450 years before most of the action. There (or then) the elderly Wind Blossom, a geneticist and daughter (Note: According to Todd McCaffrey, the grandmother–granddaughter relationship is a mistake in the first edition of Dragonsdawn that Anne McCaffrey was able to correct in the UK edition (October and November 1988 per ISFDB), and they hoped to correct it in a new US edition someday. He paraphrased his mother: "I would never have had a grandmother be so mean to her granddaughter. The UK edition is right". • McCaffrey, Todd (1 February 2010). "Letter from Jackie". Pern Home.) of the legendary Kitti Ping, is bemoaning the gradual loss of manufactured items and the technology to create them. She and her ex-protégé Tieran are startled by two fire-lizards who literally fall from the sky. One, a gold, dies upon arrival. They nurse the other one, a bronze, back to health, using the last of the antibiotics. Not knowing if the fire-lizard's sickness is contagious, they quarantine it until it recovers. Tieran adopts the fire lizard and names him Grenn, the name found on the harness he was wearing. Further investigation of the decorations on Grenn's harness leads to the incredible conclusion that he is from the future. Since fire-lizards provided the genetic basis that Kitti Ping used to build the Thread-fighting dragons (and Wind Blossom used to build the watch-whers), they speculate that this future affliction of fire-lizards might be fatal to dragons, and that is confirmed when a dead gold dragonet appears, who is obviously sickened by the same future disease. The dragon's body is destroyed, but Tieran recovers a decorated piece of metal from its harness.

In order to save the dragons of the future, Wind Blossom and Tieran devise a plan to educate someone from the future in genetics and the scientific knowledge to isolate the disease and devise a cure. They create hidden rooms in Benden Weyr and fill them with instructions and equipment to educate that future person. Tieran believes that both the fire-lizard and dragon came from the same woman in the future, since both had similar harness decorations and only women impress gold dragons. He further believes that she has some connection with himself and Wind Blossom, a connection that both dragon and fire lizards followed. He leaves a small souvenir for her in the hidden rooms.

About 400 years later, at the beginning of the 3rd Pass of the Red Star, a talented young sketch artist and amateur healer Lorana is hitching a ride across the ocean to the newly built Half-Circle seahold. In a desperate attempt to save her two fire-lizards Grenn and Garth during a storm at sea, she orders them to leave her and believes they are dead. She is found washed up on the beach by dragonriders from Benden Weyr and recovers just in time to impress Arith, a gold dragon. Meanwhile, dragons and fire-lizards are falling sick to a disease with a 100% mortality rate. Fire-lizards are banned from the Weyrs and many die due to the disease. Lorana, who can hear and speak with any dragon, thus sharing in the death of each dragon, frantically scours records in hopes of finding some sort of clue or help towards fighting the disease. She unearths records of hidden rooms in the Weyr and gets them open. The recorded voice of Wind Blossom invites her and her companions to enter and learn what they need to find a cure. Lorana's dragon Arith goes between and dies when a combination of the disease and an injection of watch-wher genetic material wreak havoc with her system. Despite the tragedy of losing Arith and the added burden of over a thousand dragon deaths, Lorana successfully learns how to use such items as a microscope and a genetic sampler to find the disease and create a cure. She can only make a single dose which she injects into the pregnant gold Minith, in hopes that the cure will be passed onto future dragon generations. Minith, her irritable rider Tullea and several others are sent between times to the past to give them time to recover. They return in triumph, with enough cure to save the rest of the dragons. An older and kinder Tullea gives Lorana an ancient locket she had swiped from the first of the hidden rooms. In it are a piece of Arith's harness and pictures of Wind Blossom, Tieran and her fire-lizard Grenn.

== Plot notes ==
The fire-lizard banishment probably lead to the absence of fire-lizards (once common creatures to the average human on Pern) by Moreta's time (5th or 6th Pass) and their "re-discovery" by F'nor and Menolly several hundred years later (9th pass).

The story also brings back a time shortly after that of Dragonsdawn, introducing the use of drums as a means of communication across distances that figures prominently in the Harper Hall trilogy and other earlier stories. Fire-lizards used to be the main relayers of messages, but with their banishment, people turned to drums to spread news.

The loss of technology leads to a shift towards an oral tradition and the creation and use of Teaching Songs.

Wind Blossom was trained by her mother Kitti Ping (Dragonsdawn), an Eridani-trained geneticist. The Eridani have a tradition of passing the responsibility of watching over genetic changes to their descendants. Wind Blossom was resistant to this idea, but it still played through as her daughter Emorra marries Tieran, and it is strongly implied that Lorana is their descendant.

Watch-whers are shown in a more prominent light compared to books written after the 9th pass. It is mentioned that they were purposely built to be nocturnal and fight Thread at night. This is a ret-con from books written by Anne McCaffrey alone. It is unclear if they continue to fight Thread by the 9th pass. Watch-whers that are with humans are misunderstood and have been reduced to chained up watchdogs.
