= The Wheels of If =

- Short story by L. Sprague de Camp
- Edd Cartier's illustration of the story in Unknown, October 1940
- Country: United States
- Language: English
- Genre: Science fiction

Publication
- Published in: Unknown Fantasy Fiction
- Media type: Print (Magazine)
- Publication date: October, 1940

"The Wheels of If" is an alternate history science fiction story by American writer L. Sprague de Camp. It was first published in the magazine Unknown Fantasy Fiction for October 1940, and first appeared in book form in de Camp's collection The Wheels of If and Other Science Fiction (Shasta, 1940). It later appeared in the paperback edition of the collection published by Berkley Books in 1970, in de Camp's subsequent collections The Virgin & the Wheels (Popular Library, 1976) and Years in the Making: the Time-Travel Stories of L. Sprague de Camp (NESFA Press, 2005), and in the anthologies Alternative Histories (Garland Publishing, 1986, and Unknown Worlds: Tales from Beyond (Galahad Books, 1989). It also appeared, together with a sequel by Harry Turtledove, in The Pugnacious Peacemaker/The Wheels of If (Tor Books, 1990) and Down in the Bottomlands and Other Places (Baen Books, 1999). The story has also been translated into German.

== Plot summary ==
New York lawyer Allister Park is inexplicably torn from his normal existence and thrust into a series of parallel universes. Each morning he discovers he has become someone else, in a world changed from his own, initially finding himself in worlds where the American Revolution failed and France won the Napoleonic Wars. Ultimately he finds himself a bishop in the alternate New York City of New Belfast, in Vinland, a North America colonized by descendants of the Vikings and now divided between Norse-derived and native polities. He determines that this new world's differences from his own stem from two divergences in the course of history, relative to his own world.

The first was that King Oswiu of Northumbria was persuaded by Celtic Christianity, rather than the pre-Schism Roman tradition, at the Synod of Whitby in 664 AD. The other was that the Franks lost the Battle of Tours in 732 AD, aborting the later rise of Charlemagne and disrupting the formation of France due to continued Umayyad occupation. This meant that Italy placed itself under the protection of the Byzantine Empire, given that the Celtic/Roman schism had rendered Roman Catholicism weaker than it was in our timeline. Gorm, a Danish monarch, succeeded in unifying the British Isles and Scandinavia, which stayed united thereafter, despite intervals of disunity. In the tenth century, one "Ketil Ingolfson" discovered North America. However, Europe had nowhere near the population scale that it possessed by the fifteenth and sixteenth centuries in our own timeline. This meant that Vinland's growth was truncated as Native Americans recovered from the arrival of European germs and epidemic disease and engaged in political consolidation. By its twentieth century, Vinland has a parliamentary democracy with several political parties and an elected legislature. "New Belfast" (New York) is its largest city. In technological terms, they have automated vehicles and aircraft, albeit steam powered in the latter case, as well as telephones in its alternate 1940.

The displacement of his consciousness turns out to have been incidental to a plot directed against his local other self, Bishop Ib Scoglund, whose campaign to extend civil rights to Vinland's native inhabitants, the Skrellings, has aroused opposition. However, that opposition also attracts foreign intervention, most notably from Sioux-dominated Dakotia, which encompasses Ohio, Wisconsin and the extreme eastern areas of North and South Dakota in our timeline. To get home, Park must continue his counterpart's struggle while somehow unraveling the mystery of how to reunite the minds of all his selves with their proper realities. Ultimately successful in these goals, he decides the life he has built for himself as "Scoglund" is better than anything he would be likely to achieve in his original life, and elects to remain in Vinland. At the very end of the story, the International Court appoints Skoglund/Park as a member of a trouble-shooting international tribunal established to deal with disputes among the various American nations.

== Reception ==
P. Schuyler Miller described the story as a "typical de Camp adventure with an alternative future wryly reminiscent of certain episodes in our own history."

== Influence ==
"The Wheels of If" is one of de Camp's most notable works. A thematic follow-up to his first significant work of alternate history, the novel Lest Darkness Fall (1939), the story is according to Steven Silver "an even more ambitious" work, in that, while most such works "limited themselves to the first few years after the change occurred", this story focuses on the consequences of divergences from actual history taking place over a thousand years in its past. It "opened the floodgates" of the field, with "approximately 1,500 novels and short stories ... published since de Camp first began exploring the field" as of 1998 (the figure is attributed to bibliographer Robert Schmunk).

American philosopher David lewis credits the story in a footnote of his 1968 paper "Counterpart theory and quantified modal logic" as a source for his conception of individuals across possible worlds (p. 115, fn.3)

Sandra Miesel identified it as one of the influences of Larry Niven's The Magic Goes Away series.

== Sequel ==
Many years after publication of de Camp's story, Harry Turtledove wrote a sequel, "The Pugnacious Peacemaker", in which Park/Scoglund serves as a diplomat attempting to defuse a war between Tawantiinsuuju (his adopted world's still-existent Inca Empire) and the Muslims who have colonized Brazil, known as the Emirate of the dar al-Harb in this timeline. Turtledove's sequel does not use de Camp's device of mind-transfer between alternate worlds, focusing instead completely on Park/Scoglund's new life in his adopted world subsequent to "The Wheels of If". The story was published together with de Camp's original story in The Pugnacious Peacemaker/The Wheels of If (Tor Books, 1990), and later in Down in the Bottomlands and Other Places (Baen Books, 1999).
