= 3000 Years of Fantasy and Science Fiction =

1972 anthology edited by L. Sprague de Camp and Catherine Crook de Camp

- Dust-jacket illustration.
- Editors: L. Sprague de Camp and Catherine Crook de Camp
- Cover artist: Emanuel Schongut
- Language: English
- Genre: Fantasy and science fiction
- Published: 1972 (Lothrop Lee & Shepard)
- Publication place: United States
- Media type: Print (Hardback)
- Pages: 256
- Followed by: Tales Beyond Time

3000 Years of Fantasy and Science Fiction is an anthology of fantasy and science fiction short stories, edited by American writers L. Sprague de Camp and Catherine Crook de Camp. It was first published in both hardcover and paperback by Lothrop Lee & Shepard in 1972. It was the first such anthology assembled by the de Camps, preceding their later Tales Beyond Time (1973).

The book collects eleven tales by various authors, with a foreword by Isaac Asimov and an overall introduction by the de Camps.

== Contents ==
- "Why Read Science Fiction? (Foreword)" (Isaac Asimov)
- "Introduction–Beyond the World We Know" (L. Sprague de Camp and Catherine Crook de Camp)
- "The Odyssey" (excerpt) (Homer)
- "Timaios" (excerpt) (Plato)
- "A Journey to the Moon" (abridged) (Cyrano de Bergerac, abridged and translated by L. Sprague de Camp)
- "The New Accelerator" (H. G. Wells)
- "The Cats of Ulthar" (H. P. Lovecraft)
- "A Martian Odyssey" (Stanley G. Weinbaum)
- "Helen O'Loy" (Lester del Rey)
- "The Cold Equations" (Tom Godwin)
- "A Gun for Dinosaur" (L. Sprague de Camp)
- "Before Eden" (Arthur C. Clarke)
- "The Last Question" (Isaac Asimov)

== Reception ==
Marguerite B. Burgess, writing in Library Journal, called the book "a solid collection of classic science fiction stories," but "contains nothing new for seasoned SF fans." She felt the Lovecraft piece "rather weak" and questioned the inclusion of the Odyssey except as "a far-fetched choice," but thought "[t]he headnotes by the de Camps ... good and informative, providing historical perspective." She recommended it as a book "librarians should order ... for their junior high school readers."

In a second Library Journal review, Frances Postell found the book "[a]n average collection of sci fi stories" with the ancient Greek excerpts "too brief" and the de Bergerac piece "overly long." She deemed the modern selections "pithy and not often anthologized" and noted the introduction "provides a capsule history of the genre." She felt it "will interest upper junior high and high school readers of fantasy and science fiction."

The Christian Century called it "an anthology worth noting and owning."
