= Stanley L. Englebardt =

American editor and writer

Stanley Lawrence Englebardt
- Born: October 1, 1925; Brooklyn, New York, US
- Died: March 31, 2014 (aged 88); Westport, Connecticut, US
- Occupations: Editor, author
- Writing career
- Genre: Nonfiction

Stanley Lawrence Englebardt (October 1, 1925 – March 31, 2014) was an American journalist, editor and writer. He wrote as Stanley L. Englebardt.

== Life ==
Stanley Englebardt was born in Brooklyn, New York, the son of Leland Englebardt, a dentist in private practice, and his wife Lillian (Levy) Englebardt. He was raised in Brooklyn.

After four years at Erasmus Hall High School, from which he graduated, Englebardt enlisted on November 23, 1943, in the United States Army as a private, serving in World War II. He was demobilized May 3, 1946.

Englebardt went on to study at New York University. He married Rita Juliet Rotheim on December 13, 1949, in Pinellas County, Florida. They made their home in Connecticut, residing in Westport from the late 1950s onwards.

Englebardt died at the age of eighty-eight on March 31, 2014, following a brief illness. Services were private.

== Career ==
Englebardt worked as a journalist, became a roving editor for Reader's Digest and finally an author of book length works of nonfiction. With particular expertise in the fields of medicine and science, he wrote more than 800 magazine articles for Argosy, Family Circle, Mechanix Illustrated, The New York Times, Popular Science, Reader's Digest, Women's Journal, and numerous other periodicals, as well as twelve books and four network television documentaries. He also wrote dozens of speeches and articles for well-known personalities. Englebardt also prepared and wrote a study on the hazards of smokeless tobacco that was published in 1990 by Major League Baseball.

Speaking at Quinnipiac University in 2001, Englebardt confessed his career as a freelance writer, a role in which he had never previously envisioned himself, had begun by happenstance. While in college he would tell bedtime stories to a friend's children, which his wife took down and sent to a publisher. "I got lucky," he observed. "The first twenty things I did and submitted were purchased and published."

Characterizing himself and his profession, he described himself as a loner in a career suited for such. "You have no real contact with humans. It takes discipline and a 'loner' type personality to write all the time." Otherwise, "All you need is an inquiring mind and the ability to look beyond the obvious." He felt that familiarity and a personal connection with a subject led to the best work, with good story ideas coming from "[t]hings you hear about, read about, and you see."

In 2010, he was interviewed by PBS regarding corporate takeovers by private equity firms and their negative impact on worker pensions, drawing on his own experience as a former employee of Reader's Digest.

== Partial bibliography ==
=== Books ===
==== The Worlds of Science series ====
- Computers (Pyramid Publications, 1962)
- Electronics (Pyramid Publications, 1963)
- New Frontiers in Medicine (Pyramid Publications, 1965)

==== Other books ====
- Strategic Defenses (Crowell, 1966)
- Careers in Data Processing (Lothrop, Lee & Shepard, 1969)
- Jobs in Health Care (Lothrop, Lee & Shepard, 1973)
- How to Avoid Your Heart Attack (Reader's Digest Press, 1974)
- Kids and Alcohol: the Deadliest Drug (Lothrop, Lee & Shepard, 1975)
- How to Get in Shape for Sports (Lothrop, Lee & Shepard, 1976)
- Keep Off the Grass! A Scientist's Documented Account of Marijuana's Destructive Effects on Man (with Gabriel G. Nahas) (Reader's Digest Press, 1976)
- The Nibbling Diet: the Natural Way to Lose Weight and Keep it Off (Putnam, 1978)
- Miracle Chip: the Microelectronic Revolution (Lothrop, Lee & Shepard, 1979)

=== Documentaries ===
- The Mighty Atom (on The Twentieth Century, CBS News, 1967)
