= Todd McCaffrey =

American science fiction writer (born 1956)

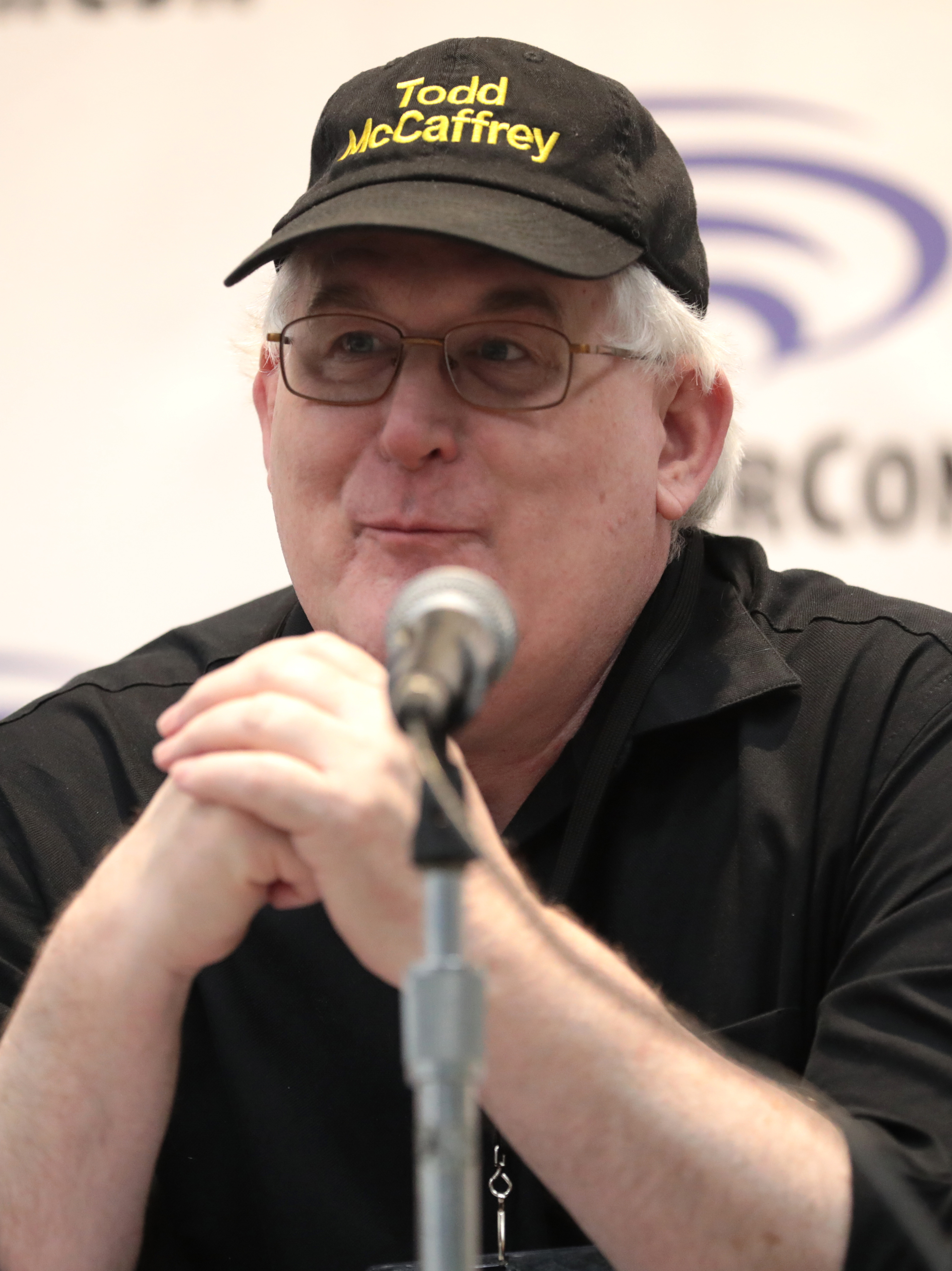
- McCaffrey at the 2023 WonderCon
- Born: Todd Johnson; April 27, 1956 (age 70); Montclair, New Jersey, U.S.
- Education: Lehigh University; Dublin Institute of Technology; Trinity College Dublin
- Occupation: Writer
- Parent(s): Anne McCaffrey; Horace Wright Johnson
- Writing career
- Pen name: Todd Johnson
- Genre: Science fiction

Todd J. McCaffrey (born April 27, 1956 as Todd Johnson) is an American science fiction writer known for continuing the Dragonriders of Pern series in collaboration with his mother Anne McCaffrey.

== Life ==
Todd Johnson was born 27 April 1956 in Montclair, New Jersey as the second son and middle child of Horace Wright Johnson (died 2009), who worked for DuPont, and Anne McCaffrey (deceased 2011), who had her second short story published that year. He has two siblings: Alec Anthony, born 1952, and Georgeanne ("Gigi", Georgeanne Kennedy), born 1959.

Except for a six-month DuPont transfer to Düsseldorf, Germany, the family lived most of a decade in Wilmington, Delaware, until a 1965 transfer to New York City when they moved to Sea Cliff, Long Island. All three children were then in school and Anne McCaffrey became a full-time author, primarily writing science fiction. About that time, Todd became the first of the children to read science fiction, the Space Cat series by Ruthven Todd. He attended his first science fiction convention in 1968, Lunacon in New York City.

Soon after the move, Todd was directed to lower his voice as an actor in the fourth-grade school play, with his mother in the auditorium. That was the inspiration for Decision at Doona (1969) which she dedicated "To Todd Johnson—of course!" The story is set on "an overcrowded planet where just talking too loud made you a social outcast".

Anne McCaffrey divorced in 1970 and emigrated to Ireland with her two younger children, soon joined by her mother. During Todd's school years the family moved several times in the vicinity of Dublin and struggled to make ends meet, supported largely by child care payments and meager royalties.

Todd finished secondary education in Ireland and returned to the United States in 1974 for a summer job before matriculation at Lehigh University in Pennsylvania. He studied engineering physics and discovered computers but remained only one year. Back in Dublin he earned a Mechanical Engineering degree at the College of Technology (Bolton Street). Later he earned a degree at Trinity College Dublin.

Before Trinity College, Todd Johnson served in the United States Army from 1978 to 1982, stationed in Stuttgart, Germany, and determining to pursue civilian life. After Trinity he returned to the US hoping to work in the aerospace industry but found employment in computer programming beginning 1986. He earned a pilot's license in 1988 and spent a lot of time flying, including solo trips across North America in 1989 and 1990. Meanwhile, he sold his first writings and contributed "Training and Fighting Dragons" to the 1989 Dragonlover's Guide to Pern, using his military and flight experience. Next year he quit his job to write full-time and in 1992 he attended the Clarion Workshop for new science fiction and fantasy writers.

Writing under the name Todd Johnson until 1997/98 he specialized in military science fiction, contributing one story each to several collective works.

== Dragons ==
As a boy, Todd accompanied his mother to her meetings with writers, editors, publishers, and agents; and had attended conventions from age 12. He was exposed to Pern before its beginning: soon after the move to Long Island when he was nine, his mother asked him what he thought of dragons; she was brainstorming about their "bad press all these years". The result was a "technologically regressed survival planet" whose people were united against a threat from space, in contrast to America divided by the Vietnam War. "The dragons became the biologically renewable air force."

About thirty years later, Todd McCaffrey recalls,

the editor at Del Rey asked me to write a "sort of scrapbook" about Mum partly to prevent Mum from writing her autobiography instead of more Pern books. That was Dragonholder [1999]. The editor had also pitched it to me that someone ought to continue Mum's legacy when she was no longer able. At the time I had misgivings and no story ideas.

Soon after selling his first stories, he had contributed the chapter "Training and Fighting Dragons" to The Dragonlover's Guide to Pern (1989). Mother and son had also discussed Pern and its setting for years, and she had suggested that he "write the military science fiction prequels" to the colonization, but that never progressed far.

Todd McCaffrey's work on Pern started in earnest with Dragon's Kin (2003), co-authored with his mother. His first solo Pern novel Dragonsblood was published in 2005. Both books are set around the beginning of Pern's "Third Pass", about 500 years after human settlement on Pern and 2000 years before the "Ninth Pass" events chronicled in most of Anne McCaffrey's Pern books including the inaugural Dragonflight. Anne and Todd published two sequels to Dragon's Kin, Todd has published two sequels to Dragonsblood, and they co-authored two further sequels to the latter, Dragon's Time in 2011, and Sky Dragons in 2012.

Todd McCaffrey was a Guest of Honor along with his mother at Albacon 2008, the annual sci-fi convention in Albany, New York. He was Literary Guest of Honor at ConDor 2009 in San Diego and at AggieCon 2009 in College Station, Texas. Todd attended DragonCon in Atlanta (September), where the 2011 Artist Guest of Honor was Michael Whelan, creator of cover art for some early Pern books including The White Dragon.

In February 2018 Todd was the Literary Guest of Honor and Keynote Speaker at the 36th annual Life, the Universe, & Everything professional science fiction and fantasy arts symposium.

== Publications ==
McCaffrey recalls that he was first paid for writing in 1988: "an animated screenplay I got them ol' Reptilon Blues Again Mommasaur" and the book Slammers Down! in a "choose your own adventure" series for Ace Books. He published under his given name Todd Johnson until the late 1990s.

=== Pern ===
- "Training and Fighting Dragons" (1989), in The Dragonlover's Guide to Pern
- Dragon's Kin (2003), Anne and Todd McCaffrey
- Dragonsblood (2005)
- Dragon's Fire (2006), Anne and Todd McCaffrey
- Dragon Harper (2007), Anne and Todd McCaffrey
- Dragonheart (2008)
- Dragongirl (2010)
- Dragon's Time (2011), Anne and Todd McCaffrey
- Sky Dragons (2012), Anne and Todd McCaffrey

=== Other ===
As Todd Johnson

- Slammers Down! (Combat Command: In the World of David Drake's Hammer's Slammers) (1988)
- "The Archimedes Effect", The War Years #1: The Far Stars War (1990)
- "Dasher", The War Years #3: The Jupiter War (1991)
- "Ploughshare", Bolo: Honor of the Regiment (1993)
- "Legacy", Bolos 2: The Unconquerable (1994)
- "A Question of Valor", Bolos: Last Stand (1997)

As Todd McCaffrey

- "Best Evidence" (1998)
- Dragonholder: The Life and Dreams (so Far) of Anne McCaffrey (1999)
- "The Dragons of Prague", (Doctor Who) Short Trips: Destination Prague (2007)
- "Tribute", Jim Baen's Universe, August 2008 (2008)
- "Tree" (2008)
- "DragonCon: Trials and Tribulations" (2008)
- "The Terrorist in My Kitchen" (2012)
- "Robin Redbreast" (2012)
- "Men!" (2012)
- "Stone the Crows" (2012)
- "The One Tree of Luna" (2012)
- "Why I Shot My Car" (2012)
- "Rhubarb and Beets" (2013)
- "To the Nearest Planet" (2013)
- "Red Roses" (2014)
- "Golden" (2014)
- "With Fones" (2016)
