= Catherine Crook de Camp =

American novelist (1907–2000)

Catherine Adelaide Crook de Camp
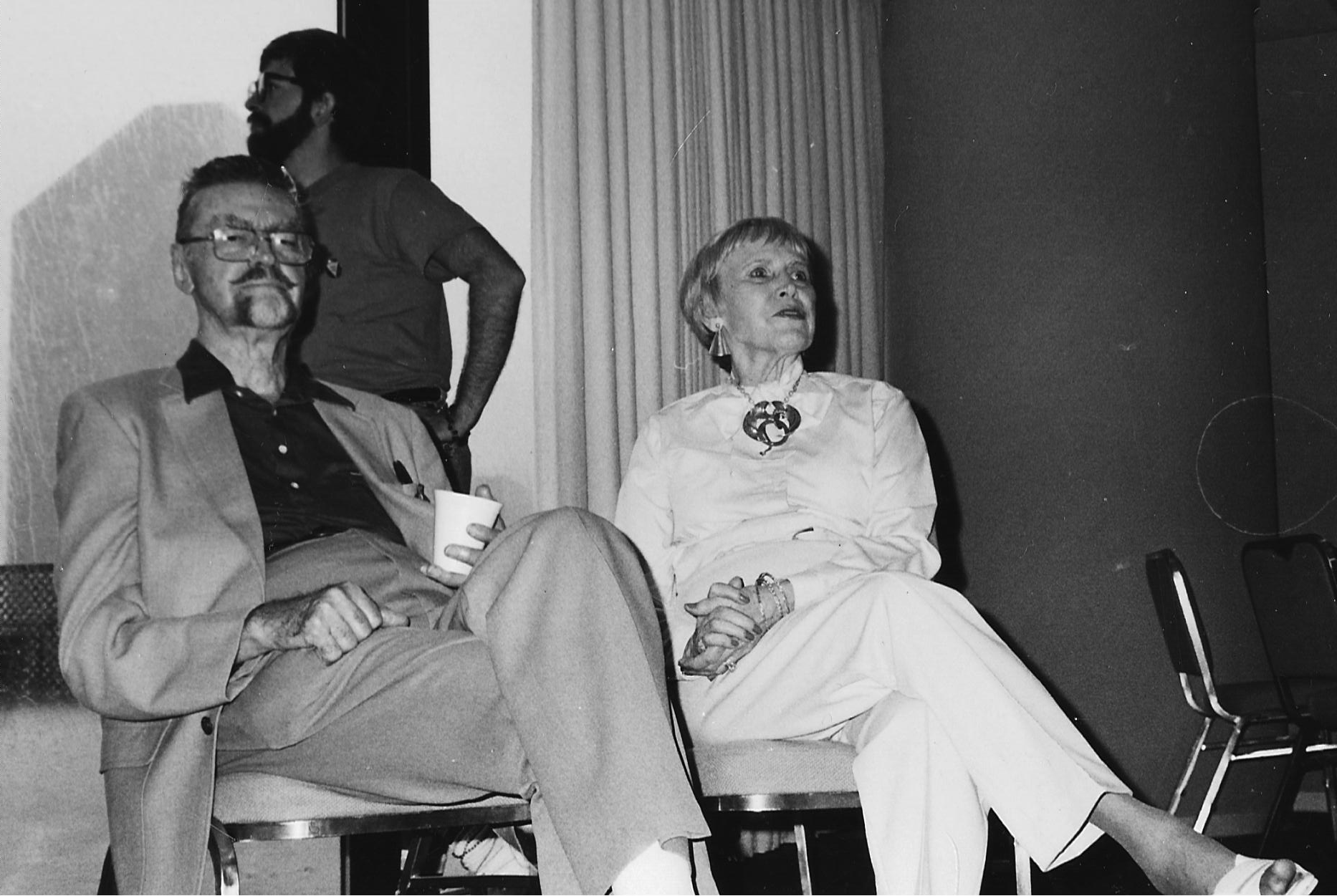
- Catherine Crook de Camp with her husband, L. Sprague de Camp
- Born: November 6, 1907; New York City
- Died: April 9, 2000 (aged 92); Plano, Texas, US
- Occupations: Author and editor
- Writing career
- Genres: Science fiction, Fantasy
- Website: www.lspraguedecamp.com

Catherine Crook de Camp (November 6, 1907 – April 9, 2000) was an American science fiction and fantasy author and editor. Most of her work was done in collaboration with her husband L. Sprague de Camp, to whom she was married for sixty years. Her solo work was largely non-fiction.

== Life ==
She was born Catherine Adelaide Crook. She majored in English and Economics at Barnard College, New York, from which she graduated magna cum laude. After college she was a teacher. She was introduced to her future husband L. Sprague de Camp by her sister Dorothy, and married him in 1940. They had two sons, Lyman Sprague de Camp and Gerard Beekman de Camp.

The de Camps lived for many years in Villanova, Pennsylvania, and moved to Plano, Texas in 1989.

They collaborated on numerous works of fiction and nonfiction beginning in the 1960s, with Catherine revising Sprague's drafts. Catherine's contributions were not always credited. She also wrote The Money Tree, Teach Your Child to Manage Money, and Creatures of the Cosmos on her own.

She was a member of Science Fiction Writers of America, the Authors Guild, and First Fandom. Over the years she attended many science fiction conventions and traveled widely all over the world with her husband. In her final years she suffered from Alzheimer's disease.

Robert A. Heinlein in part dedicated his 1982 novel Friday to Catherine.

Catherine died on April 9, 2000, aged 92. Sprague de Camp survived her by six months. Their ashes share a columbarium niche together in Arlington National Cemetery.

== In popular culture ==
Catherine Crook de Camp has been depicted in fictional works by a number of other authors, generally together with her husband. In particular, she appears in S. M. Stirling's 2008 alternate history novel In the Courts of the Crimson Kings and Paul Malmont's 2011 historical novel The Astounding, the Amazing, and the Unknown.

== Bibliography ==
=== Science fiction ===
- The Bones of Zora (1983) (with L. Sprague de Camp)
- The Swords of Zinjaban (1991) (with L. Sprague de Camp)
- The Stones of Nomuru (1988) (with L. Sprague de Camp)

=== Fantasy ===
- Conan the Barbarian (1982) (with L. Sprague de Camp and Lin Carter)
- The Incorporated Knight (1987) (with L. Sprague de Camp), ISBN 0-671-65435-7
- The Pixilated Peeress (1991) (with L. Sprague de Camp)

=== Collection ===
- Footprints on Sand (1981) (with L. Sprague de Camp)

=== Edited ===
- Creatures of the Cosmos (1977) (editor)
- 3000 Years of Fantasy and Science Fiction (1972) (with L. Sprague de Camp)
- Tales Beyond Time (1973) (with L. Sprague de Camp)

=== Nonfiction ===
- The Money Tree (1972)
- Teach Your Child To Manage Money (1974)
- Dark Valley Destiny: the Life of Robert E. Howard (1983), ISBN 0-312-94074-2 (with L. Sprague de Camp and Jane Whittington Griffin)
- Ancient Ruins and Archaeology (1964; vt. Citadels of Mystery (1972)) (with L. Sprague de Camp), OCLC 392367
- Darwin and His Great Discovery (1972) (with L. Sprague de Camp)
- Spirits, Stars, and Spells: the Profits and Perils of Magic (1966) (with L. Sprague de Camp)
- The Day of the Dinosaur (1968) (with L. Sprague de Camp)
- The Story of Science in America (1967) (with L. Sprague de Camp)
- Science-Fiction Handbook (1953 (revised 1975, 1977 with L. Sprague de Camp))
