= The Day of the Dinosaur =

Book by Lyon Sprague de Camp

- Dust-jacket for The Day of the Dinosaur
- Author: L. Sprague de Camp and Catherine Crook de Camp
- Cover artist: Patricia Saville Voehl
- Language: English
- Subject: Paleontology
- Publisher: Doubleday
- Publication date: 1968
- Publication place: United States
- Media type: Print (Hardback)
- Pages: xiii, 319 pages

The Day of the Dinosaur is a science book by L. Sprague de Camp and Catherine Crook de Camp, illustrated with plates. It was first published in hardcover by Doubleday in 1968, and in paperback by Curtis Books in 1970 or 1971. A second hardcover edition was issued by Bonanza Books in 1985. The first chapter was reprinted as "One Day in the Cretaceous" in the de Camps's collection Footprints on Sand (Advent, 1981).

== Summary ==
As stated on the dust cover of the Doubleday edition, the work is a survey of "the exciting story of the lost world of the great reptiles and of the fossil hunters who discovered them millions of years later." It argues, among other things, that the theory of evolution took hold after Darwin because of interest spurred by recently popularized dinosaur remains, corresponding to legends of dragons.

== Contents ==
- The Day of the Dinosaur
- The Finding of the Dragons
- Out of the Sea
- Life Invades the Land
- The Rise of the Dinosaurs
- The Reptilian Middle Age
- Reptiles of Sea and Air
- The Doom of the Dragons
- The Great Fossil Feud
- Diggers and Dinosaurs
- The Heritage of the Dragons
- Dinosaurs in the World of Today
- Notes
- Bibliography
- Index

== Reception ==
Bonanza Books, 1985

Publishers' Weekly called the book "clear, comprehensive, [and] well-researched," noting that it "begins as a vivid and scientifically sound depiction of the age of the giant dinosaurs [and] develops into an impressive tribute to the science of paleontology. Awesome and sometimes spine-chilling as some of the de Camps' descriptions are ... the human story of the first discovery of fossils and the realization of their implications communicates a drama of its own." Summing up, he noted that "[r]eaders who are for the first time being introduced to the wonders of paleontology will be engrossed."

Mary L. Blackwell, writing in Library Journal called it "an accurate and vivid description of the great creatures who roamed the earth more than 100 million years ago and also a fascinating account of the earth itself that makes the reality of its antiquity comprehensible." She felt the authors' "carefully organized, practical approach" resulted in "a book that will appeal not only to students of paleontology but to everyone interested in this remote world." She rated it "[r]ecommended for any public or school library."

In Natural History Isaac Asimov, noting that "few people ... can speak more charmingly and enlightenedly about scientific subjects than L. Sprague de Camp," felt "[t]he book reads ... like a pleasant and informal lecture, given at their ease, by a pair of enormously rational and urbane individuals" with which he found it "virtually impossible to find fault." He singled out the way the de Camps "make the dinosaurs come alive by picturing them in action" and the "most remarkable first chapter ... which ... is an evocation (the best I know) of a typical day in the Mesozoic." He felt that "[t]he book deals, satisfactorily, with the paleontologists and their discoveries, too, especially with the Cope-Marsh feud [and] with the effects on contemporary man of the great discoveries of paleontology; the impetus given to the search for giant living creatures--and to romancing about them--and the ferocious object lesson given on the subject of mass extinctions." He also notes that the de Camps point out "[w]e are in the midst of [another] great dying now, ... brought on by man himself."

The Booklist characterized the book as "[a]n informative, comprehensible, often lively survey of the Age of Reptiles and the careers of some of the scientists who found and studied dinosaur fossils." Science Books rated it "[a] very comprehensive book about Mesozoic reptiles, [with] [t]the text ... quite free of inaccuracies and... accompanied by many good illustrations," and "[t]he writing style [as] fluctuat[ing] between ... humorous whimsy and scientific exposition, which may limit its popularity." It called "[t]he section [on] the history of the early fossil hunters and development of the great natural history museums ... a real contribution, since this information is collected from many disparate sources."

Philip and Phylis Morrison, writing for Scientific American, found it "excellent and fresh, ... lively and intelligent," "a savory mixture of biology and history, ... cover[ing] a wide range of lore and logic, from genetics and the problem of extinction to the scaling of beasts." "Skeptical and yet imaginative," they wrote, "the text lives up to the De Camp reputation." They found the book's "final imaginary safari in the Jurassic ... logically planned: for the big flesh-eaters one had best carry a real elephant gun, the Continental .600 or perhaps the Holland & Holland double express .500."

Bruce Fleury, in a retrospective more than twenty years after the book's initial publication, noted that it "precede[d] the 'dinosaur renaissance' but remain[ed a] valuable and readable introduction to the subject" and "[l]ike De Camp's many other popular works on scientific topics, ... well written and ... highly recommended."
