= The Bones of Zora =

1983 novel by Lyon Sprague de Camp

- Cover of the first edition.
- Author: L. Sprague de Camp and Catherine Crook de Camp
- Cover artist: Victoria Poyser
- Language: English
- Series: Krishna
- Genre: Science fiction
- Publisher: Phantasia Press
- Publication date: 1983
- Publication place: United States
- Media type: Print (Hardback)
- ISBN: 0-932096-27-1
- OCLC: 10013934
- Dewey Decimal: 813/.52 20
- LC Class: PS3507.E2344 B65 1983
- Preceded by: The Virgin of Zesh
- Followed by: The Tower of Zanid

The Bones of Zora is a science fiction novel by American writers L. Sprague de Camp and Catherine Crook de Camp, the ninth book of the former's Viagens Interplanetarias series and the seventh of its subseries of stories set on the fictional planet Krishna. Chronologically it is the sixth Krishna novel. It was first published in hardcover by Phantasia Press in 1983, and in paperback by Ace Books in August, 1984 as part of the standard edition of the Krishna novels. An E-book edition was published by Gollancz's SF Gateway imprint on September 29, 2011 as part of a general release of de Camp's works in electronic form. The novel has also been translated into German.

As with all of the "Krishna" novels, the title of The Bones of Zora has a "Z" in it, a practice de Camp claimed to have devised to keep track of them. Short stories in the series do not follow the practice, nor do Viagens Interplanetarias works not set on Krishna.

== Plot summary ==
Fergus Reith, prime Terran tour guide on the planet Krishna, finds himself between tours and on a somewhat different job, working with Aristide Marot, a French paleontologist out to unravel the mysteries of Krishnan vertebrate evolution. Marot is particularly interested in the era when life first emerged from the seas; as Krishna's surface is mostly land and its bodies of water are separated from each other, he theorizes the planet's animal species could have multiple origins.

Standard Ace edition of The Bones of Zora by L. Sprague de Camp and Catherine Crook de Camp, Ace Books, 1984

Fergus guides Marot to the most promising fossil-bearing site, near the town of Kubyab on the banks of the upper Zora River in the Dashtate of Chilihagh. There they find a rival, Marot's competitor Warren Foltz, who is fanatically attached to a rival theory and is not averse to destroying contrary evidence. Moreover, Foltz is being assisted by xenologist Alicia Dyckman, to whom Fergus had formerly been wed in a stormy marriage culminating in divorce. The cause was Alicia's contentious and overbearing personality; convinced she always knew best, she had interfered with Fergus's tours to the point that he had finally barred her from participating.

Miserable, at an emotional low ebb, and exploited by Foltz, Alicia now regrets having left Fergus, but their jobs keep them in continued opposition. Reith's scientific adventure is thus beset by skullduggery, violence, and tempestuous personal relations. Blessed with beginner's luck, he actually discovers a fossil supporting Marot's theory, which Foltz endeavors to hijack and break up.

Various complications ensue; Fergus and Alicia are brought back together by their mutual passion for each other and enmity with Foltz, only to be alienated again due to Alicia's extreme behavior. Ultimately Fergus decides with regret it would be disastrous to take her back, and she leaves Krishna heartbroken, hoping to find treatment for her personality disorders on Earth.

The Bones of Zora is unique among the later Krishna novels in its inclusion of a non-Krishnan extraterrestrial, a reptilian native of the planet Osiris. While such aliens were fairly common in the earliest of de Camp's Krishna books, his later works usually focus on Terrans and Krishnans only.

== Setting ==
The planet Krishna is de Camp's premier creation in the Sword and Planet genre, representing both a tribute to the Barsoom novels of Edgar Rice Burroughs and an attempt to "get it right", reconstructing the concept logically, without what he regarded as Burroughs' biological and technological absurdities. De Camp intended the stories as "pure entertainment in the form of light, humorous, swashbuckling, interplanetary adventure-romances - a sort of sophisticated Burroughs-type story, more carefully thought out than their prototypes."

As dated in James Cambias's GURPS Planet Krishna (a 1997 gaming guide to the Viagens series authorized by de Camp), the action of The Bones of Zora takes place in the year 2151 AD., falling between The Virgin of Zesh and The Tower of Zanid, and making it the tenth story set on Krishna in terms of chronology. Internal evidence in The Bones of Zora confirms the relative sequence of Virgin and Zora.

== Reception ==
According to Publishers Weekly, "[t]his ... first collaboration in the long-running Krishna series [is] very much in the same lighthearted adventure vein as de Camp's solo efforts ... There's plenty of amusing action ... plus some wry, wise observations on relationships. After 46 years, the de Camp imprimatur still guarantees a good time.

Tom Easton, writing in Analog Science Fiction/Science Fact, took a different view, calling the book "less good than its predecessors, partly because it is too much of a reprise. Too often, the pages ask (and answer), "Whatever happened to so and so?" and the story suffers for its lack of original novelty." He cautioned that "anyone who first visits Krishna through Bones is going to wonder what all the fuss is about," noting that "though the complications lend pace and fury to the action, they seem arbitrary, staged, like a tornado in a wind tunnel." But he concluded "[n]evertheless, I am sure there are enough Krishna fans to buy out the Phantasia edition. They will enjoy the book enough to justify the expense."

In Issue 29 of Abyss, Eric Olson called this "both an enjoyable and an edifying read. This may not be a great or world shaking work, but it is a model of how to create an alien society which is believable, detailed and fun.""

Robert Coulson, in Amazing Science Fiction Stories, agreed that "[i]t's not the best book in the Krishnan series, but it's entertaining and well worth your time." He characterized the story as "[a]n amusing trek through the pre-industrial societies of Krishna." Regarding the characters, he called "Reith's wimpish attitude toward Alicia ... believable if infuriating; the rest of the cast, plot, and background are good."

Don D'Ammassa, addressing this and other late entries in the Viagens series, wrote "[t]he quality of the series remains undiminished in [these] volumes, which combine good-natured mayhem and a crisp, exciting narrative style.

== Relation to other works ==
The main plot device of bickering male and female protagonists not destined for a happy ending together is featured in several late de Camp novels, notably The Prisoner of Zhamanak (1982), The Incorporated Knight (1987), and The Pixilated Peeress (1991).

== Notes ==
Preceded by The Virgin of Zesh	Krishna tales of L. Sprague de Camp; The Bones of Zora	Succeeded by The Tower of Zanid
