= Leonard Everett Fisher =

American artist (1924–2024)

Leonard Everett Fisher (June 24, 1924 – March 2, 2024) was an American artist best known for illustrating children's books. From 1955 he illustrated about 250 books for younger readers including about 88 that he also wrote.

== Biography ==
Fisher was born in the Bronx borough of New York City in June 1924 and was raised in the Sea Gate section of Brooklyn. Fisher served in the U.S. Army during World War II. He began his formal art training with his Brooklyn-born father, Benjamin M. Fisher, a designer of naval vessels, who contributed to the construction of Simon Lake submarines in Bridgeport, Connecticut, and such US Navy warships as USS Arizona, USS Honolulu, and USS North Carolina—all designed, built, and commissioned at the Brooklyn, New York Navy Yard (1913–1937). Between 1932 and 1942, Leonard Everett Fisher continued his training at the Heckscher Foundation (NY), with Moses and Raphael Soyer (NY), with Reginald Marsh at the Art Students League of New York, and Serge Chermayeff at Brooklyn College. He was a graduate of Yale University (BFA 1949, MFA 1950).

On July 15, 2014, Fisher was announced as a finalist for the 2015 NSK Neustadt Prize for Children's Literature.

Fisher lived in Westport, Connecticut, with his wife, Margery, a retired school librarian, and member of New York's Bank Street College of Education's Children's Book Committee. They were the parents of three children and the grandparents of six. Leonard Everett Fisher died on March 2, 2024, at the age of 99.
