= L. Sprague de Camp bibliography =

Bibliography of science fiction, fantasy, historical fiction and nonfiction writer L. Sprague de Camp:

== Science fiction ==
=== The Viagens Interplanetarias ===
- Krishna
  - "Finished" (1949 - collected in The Continent Makers and Other Tales of the Viagens (1953))
  - "Perpetual Motion" (1950 - collected in The Continent Makers and Other Tales of the Viagens (1953) and The Queen of Zamba (1977))
  - The Queen of Zamba (1949 - collected in The Queen of Zamba (1977)) [vt Cosmic Manhunt (1954)], ISBN 0-441-69658-9
  - "Calories" (1951 - collected in Sprague de Camp's New Anthology of Science Fiction (1953))
  - The Hand of Zei (1950), ISBN 0-671-69865-6
  - The Hostage of Zir (1977)
  - The Prisoner of Zhamanak (1982)
  - The Virgin of Zesh (1953 - collected in The Virgin & the Wheels (1976) and The Virgin of Zesh & The Tower of Zanid (1982)), ISBN 0-441-86495-3
  - The Bones of Zora (1983) (with Catherine Crook de Camp)
  - The Tower of Zanid (1958 - collected in The Virgin of Zesh & The Tower of Zanid (1982)), ISBN 0-441-86495-3
  - The Swords of Zinjaban (1991) (with Catherine Crook de Camp)
- Earth
  - "The Colorful Character" (1949 - collected in Sprague de Camp's New Anthology of Science Fiction (1953))
  - "The Inspector's Teeth" (1950 - collected in The Continent Makers and Other Tales of the Viagens (1953) and The Best of L. Sprague de Camp (1978))
  - "The Continent Makers" (1951 - collected in The Continent Makers and Other Tales of the Viagens (1953))
- Osiris
  - "Summer Wear" (1950 - collected in The Continent Makers and Other Tales of the Viagens (1953))
  - "Git Along!" (1950 - collected in The Continent Makers and Other Tales of the Viagens (1953))
- Vishnu
  - "The Galton Whistle" (1951 - collected in The Continent Makers and Other Tales of the Viagens (1953))
  - "The Animal-Cracker Plot" (1949 - collected in The Continent Makers and Other Tales of the Viagens (1953))
- Ormazd
  - Rogue Queen (1951)
- Kukulkan
  - The Stones of Nomuru (1988) (with Catherine Crook de Camp)
  - The Venom Trees of Sunga (1992)
- Collections
  - The Continent Makers and Other Tales of the Viagens (1953)
  - The Queen of Zamba (1977)
  - The Virgin of Zesh & The Tower of Zanid (1983)

=== Reginald Rivers ===
- "A Gun for Dinosaur" (1956 - collected in A Gun for Dinosaur and Other Imaginative Tales (1963), The Best of L. Sprague de Camp (1978), Rivers of Time (1993), Aristotle and the Gun and Other Stories (2002) and Years in the Making: the Time-Travel Stories of L. Sprague de Camp (2005))
- "The Cayuse" (1993 - collected in Rivers of Time (1993))
- "Crocamander Quest" (1992 - collected in Rivers of Time (1993))
- "Miocene Romance" (1993 - collected in Rivers of Time (1993))
- "The Synthetic Barbarian" (1992 - collected in Rivers of Time (1993))
- "The Satanic Illusion" (1992 - collected in Rivers of Time (1993))
- "The Big Splash" (1992 - collected in Rivers of Time (1993))
- "The Mislaid Mastodon" (1993 - collected in Rivers of Time (1993) and Aristotle and the Gun and Other Stories (2002))
- "The Honeymoon Dragon" (1993 - collected in Rivers of Time (1993) and Aristotle and the Gun and Other Stories (2002))
- Rivers of Time (collection) (1993)

=== Johnny Black ===
- "The Command" (1938 - collected in The Best of L. Sprague de Camp (1978); rewritten as "The Bear Who Saved the World" (1977, with Catherine Crook de Camp))
- "The Incorrigible" (1939)
- "The Emancipated" (1940)
- "The Exalted" (1940)

=== Drinkwhiskey Institute ===
- "Some Curious Effects of Time Travel" (1942 - collected in Scribblings (1972))
- "The Anecdote of the Negative Wugug" (1942 - collected in Scribblings (1972))
- "The Anecdote of the Movable Ears" (1943 - collected in Scribblings (1972))
- "The Lusts of Professor Adams" (1972 - collected in Scribblings (1972))

=== Other science fiction novels and collections ===
- Lest Darkness Fall (1941 - collected in Years in the Making: the Time-Travel Stories of L. Sprague de Camp (2005)), ISBN 0-671-87736-4
- Divide and Rule (1948), ISBN 0-8125-0362-7
- The Wheels of If and Other Science Fiction (1948)
- Genus Homo (1950) (with P. Schuyler Miller)
- Sprague de Camp's New Anthology of Science Fiction (1953)
- The Glory That Was (1960), ISBN 0-671-72116-X
- A Gun for Dinosaur and Other Imaginative Tales (1963)
- Scribblings (1972)
- The Virgin & the Wheels (1976)
- The Best of L. Sprague de Camp (1978)
- The Great Fetish (1978)
- Footprints on Sand (1981) (with Catherine Crook de Camp), ISBN 0-911682-25-2
- Aristotle and the Gun and Other Stories (2002)
- Years in the Making: the Time-Travel Stories of L. Sprague de Camp (2005)

=== Other science fiction short stories ===
- "The Isolinguals" (1937 - collected in Years in the Making: the Time-Travel Stories of L. Sprague de Camp (2005))
- "Hyperpilosity" (1938 - collected in The Wheels of If and Other Science Fiction (1948) and The Best of L. Sprague de Camp (1978))
- "The Merman" (1938 - collected in The Wheels of If and Other Science Fiction (1948) and The Best of L. Sprague de Camp (1978))
- "Ananias" (1939)
- "Divide and Rule" (1939 - collected in Divide and Rule (1948))
- "Employment" (1939 - collected in The Best of L. Sprague de Camp (1978))
- "Living Fossil" (1939)
- "The Blue Giraffe" (1939)
- "The Gnarly Man" (1939 - collected in The Wheels of If and Other Science Fiction (1948), The Best of L. Sprague de Camp (1978), Aristotle and the Gun and Other Stories (2002) and Years in the Making: the Time-Travel Stories of L. Sprague de Camp (2005))
- "The Hairless Ones Come" (1939)
- "Asokore Power" (1940)
- "Inverse Variation" (1940)
- "Juice" (1940 - collected in Sprague de Camp's New Anthology of Science Fiction (1953))
- "The Warrior Race" (1940 - collected in The Wheels of If and Other Science Fiction (1948) and Years in the Making: the Time-Travel Stories of L. Sprague de Camp (2005))
- "The Wheels of If" (1940 - collected in The Wheels of If and Other Science Fiction (1948) and The Virgin & the Wheels (1976))
- "Invaders From Nowhere" (1941)
- "The Best-Laid Scheme" (1941 - collected in The Wheels of If and Other Science Fiction (1948))
- "The Stolen Dormouse" (1941 - collected in Divide and Rule (1948))
- "The Contraband Cow" (1942 - collected in The Wheels of If and Other Science Fiction (1948))
- "The Hibited Man" (1949)
- "Throwback" (1949 - collected in A Gun for Dinosaur and Other Imaginative Tales (1963))
- "In-Group" (1952 - collected in A Gun for Dinosaur and Other Imaginative Tales (1963))
- "Proposal" (1952 - collected in Sprague de Camp's New Anthology of Science Fiction (1953))
- "The Blunderer" (1952)
- "The Guided Man" (1952 - collected in A Gun for Dinosaur and Other Imaginative Tales (1963) and The Best of L. Sprague de Camp (1978))
- "The Ordeal of Professor Klein" (1952)
- "The Saxon Pretender" (1952 - collected in Sprague de Camp's New Anthology of Science Fiction (1953))
- "The Soaring Statue" (1952)
- "The Space Clause" (1952 - collected in Sprague de Camp's New Anthology of Science Fiction (1953) and Footprints on Sand (1981))
- "Cornzan the Mighty" (1955 - collected in A Gun for Dinosaur and Other Imaginative Tales (1963))
- "Gratitude" (1955 - collected in A Gun for Dinosaur and Other Imaginative Tales (1963))
- "Judgment Day" (1955 - collected in A Gun for Dinosaur and Other Imaginative Tales (1963) and The Best of L. Sprague de Camp (1978))
- "Possession" (1955)
- "Impractical Joke" (1956 - collected in A Gun for Dinosaur and Other Imaginative Tales (1963))
- "Internal Combustion" (1956 - collected in A Gun for Dinosaur and Other Imaginative Tales (1963))
- "New Arcadia" (1956 - collected in A Gun for Dinosaur and Other Imaginative Tales (1963))
- "The Egg" (1956 - collected in A Gun for Dinosaur and Other Imaginative Tales (1963))
- "Wyvernhold" (1956)
- "A Thing of Custom" (1957 - collected in A Gun for Dinosaur and Other Imaginative Tales (1963))
- "Let's Have Fun" (1957 - collected in A Gun for Dinosaur and Other Imaginative Tales (1963))
- "Aristotle and the Gun" (1958 - collected in A Gun for Dinosaur and Other Imaginative Tales (1963), Aristotle and the Gun and Other Stories (2002) and Years in the Making: the Time-Travel Stories of L. Sprague de Camp (2005))
- "Heretic in a Balloon" (1977 - collected in The Great Fetish (1978))
- "The Witches of Manhattan" (1978 - collected in The Great Fetish (1978))
- "The Round-Eyed Barbarians" (1992)

== Fantasy ==
=== Harold Shea ===
==== Original series ====
1. "The Roaring Trumpet" (May 1940) (L. Sprague de Camp and Fletcher Pratt)
2. "The Mathematics of Magic" (Aug. 1940) (L. Sprague de Camp and Fletcher Pratt)
3. "The Castle of Iron" (Apr. 1941, expanded to novel length as The Castle of Iron, 1950) (L. Sprague de Camp and Fletcher Pratt)
4. "The Wall of Serpents" (1953) (L. Sprague de Camp and Fletcher Pratt)
5. "The Green Magician" (1954) (L. Sprague de Camp and Fletcher Pratt)

==== Later series ====
1. "Professor Harold and the Trustees" (1992) (Christopher Stasheff)
2. "Sir Harold and the Gnome King" (1990) (L. Sprague de Camp)
3. "Sir Harold and the Monkey King" (1992) (Christopher Stasheff)
4. "Knight and the Enemy" (1992) (Holly Lisle, from an outline by L. Sprague de Camp and Christopher Stasheff)
5. "Arms and the Enchanter" (1992) (John Maddox Roberts, from an outline by L. Sprague de Camp and Christopher Stasheff)
6. "Enchanter Kiev" (1995) (Roland J. Green & Frieda A. Murray)
7. "Sir Harold and the Hindu King" (1995) (Christopher Stasheff)
8. "Sir Harold of Zodanga" (1995) (L. Sprague de Camp)
9. "Harold Shakespeare" (1995) (Tom Wham)
10. "Return to Xanadu" (2005) (Lawrence Watt-Evans)

==== Collected editions ====
- The Incomplete Enchanter (1941) (L. Sprague DeCamp and Fletcher Pratt), includes: "The Roaring Trumpet" and "The Mathematics of Magic"
- The Castle of Iron (1950) (L. Sprague DeCamp and Fletcher Pratt), a novel-length expansion of the original story
- Wall of Serpents (1960) (L. Sprague DeCamp and Fletcher Pratt), includes: "The Wall of Serpents" and "The Green Magician"
- The Compleat Enchanter (1975 omnibus including The Incompleat Enchanter and The Castle of Iron) (with Fletcher Pratt)
- The Complete Compleat Enchanter (1989 omnibus including: "The Roaring Trumpet" and "The Mathematics of Magic" [aka The Incompleat Enchanter], The Castle of Iron, Wall of Serpents, and The Green Magician) (with Fletcher Pratt)
- The Enchanter Reborn (1992) (L. Sprague DeCamp and Christopher Stasheff), includes: "Professor Harold and the Trustees," "Sir Harold and the Gnome King," "Sir Harold and the Monkey King," "Knight and the Enemy," and "Arms and the Enchanter"
- The Exotic Enchanter (1995) (L. Sprague DeCamp and Christopher Stasheff), includes: "Enchanter Kiev," "Sir Harold and the Hindu King," "Sir Harold of Zodanga," and "Harold Shakespeare"
- The Mathematics of Magic: The Enchanter Stories of L. Sprague de Camp and Fletcher Pratt (2007 omnibus including The Incompleat Enchanter, The Castle of Iron, Wall of Serpents, Sir Harold and the Gnome King and "Sir Harold of Zodanga") (with Fletcher Pratt)

=== Gavagan's Bar ===
- "The Gift of God" (1950) (L. Sprague de Camp and Fletcher Pratt)
- "Corpus Delectable" (1953) (L. Sprague de Camp and Fletcher Pratt)
- "The Better Mousetrap" (1950) (L. Sprague de Camp and Fletcher Pratt)
- "Elephas Frumenti" (1950) (L. Sprague de Camp and Fletcher Pratt)
- "Beasts of Bourbon" (1951) (L. Sprague de Camp and Fletcher Pratt)
- "The Love-Nest" (1953) (L. Sprague de Camp and Fletcher Pratt)
- "The Stone of the Sages" (1953) (L. Sprague de Camp and Fletcher Pratt)
- "Where To, Please?" (1952) (L. Sprague de Camp and Fletcher Pratt)
- "The Palimpsest of St. Augustine" (1953) (L. Sprague de Camp and Fletcher Pratt)
- "More Than Skin Deep" (1951) (L. Sprague de Camp and Fletcher Pratt)
- "No Forwarding Address" (1953) (L. Sprague de Camp and Fletcher Pratt)
- "When the Night Wind Howls" (aka "Methought I Heard a Voice") (1951) (L. Sprague de Camp and Fletcher Pratt)
- "My Brother's Keeper" (1953) (L. Sprague de Camp and Fletcher Pratt)
- "A Dime Brings You Success" (1953) (L. Sprague de Camp and Fletcher Pratt)
- "The Rape of the Lock" (1952) (L. Sprague de Camp and Fletcher Pratt)
- "All That Glitters" (1953) (L. Sprague de Camp and Fletcher Pratt)
- "Here, Putzi!" (1953) (L. Sprague de Camp and Fletcher Pratt)
- "Gin Comes in Bottles" (1953) (L. Sprague de Camp and Fletcher Pratt)
- "The Black Ball" (1952) (L. Sprague de Camp and Fletcher Pratt)
- "The Green Thumb" (1953) (L. Sprague de Camp and Fletcher Pratt)
- "Caveat Emptor" (1953) (L. Sprague de Camp and Fletcher Pratt)
- "The Eve of St. John" (1953) (L. Sprague de Camp and Fletcher Pratt)
- "The Ancestral Amethyst" (1952) (L. Sprague de Camp and Fletcher Pratt)
- "The Untimely Toper" (1953) (L. Sprague de Camp and Fletcher Pratt)
- "One Man's Meat" (1953) (L. Sprague de Camp and Fletcher Pratt)
- "Oh, Say! Can You See?" (1959) (L. Sprague de Camp and Fletcher Pratt)
- "Bell, Book, and Candle" (1959) (L. Sprague de Camp and Fletcher Pratt)
- "There'd Be Thousands in It" (1978) (L. Sprague de Camp and Fletcher Pratt)
- "The Weissenbroch Spectacles" (1954) (L. Sprague de Camp and Fletcher Pratt)
- Tales from Gavagan's Bar (1953 collection, expanded 1978) (L. Sprague de Camp and Fletcher Pratt)

=== Pusadian Series ===
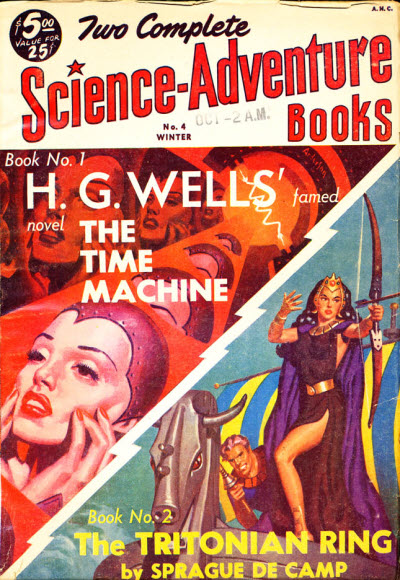
The Tritonian Ring was originally published in Two Complete Science-Adventure Books in 1951

- The Tritonian Ring (1951 - collected in The Tritonian Ring and Other Pusadian Tales (1953))
- "The Eye of Tandyla" (1951 - collected in The Tritonian Ring and Other Pusadian Tales (1953))
- "The Owl and the Ape" (1951 - collected in The Tritonian Ring and Other Pusadian Tales (1953))
- "The Hungry Hercynian" (1953)
- "The Stone of the Witch Queen" (1977)
- "Ka the Appalling" (1958 - collected in The Reluctant Shaman and Other Fantastic Tales (1970))
- "The Rug and the Bull" (1974)
- "The Stronger Spell" (1953 - collected in The Tritonian Ring and Other Pusadian Tales (1953))
- The Tritonian Ring and Other Pusadian Tales (collection) (1953)

=== Novarian series ===
- The Goblin Tower (1968), ISBN 0-345-32812-4
- The Clocks of Iraz (1971)
- The Fallible Fiend (1973)
- "The Emperor's Fan" (1973 - collected in The Best of L. Sprague de Camp and Footprints on Sand (1981)) (short story)
- The Unbeheaded King (1983), ISBN 0-345-30773-9
- The Reluctant King (1985 omnibus including The Goblin Tower, The Clocks of Iraz and The Unbeheaded King)
- The Honorable Barbarian (1989), ISBN 0-345-36091-5
- The Sedulous Sprite (unpublished)

=== Neo-Napolitanian series ===
- "Two Yards of Dragon" (1976 - collected in The Best of L. Sprague de Camp (1978), The Incorporated Knight (1987) and Aristotle and the Gun and Other Stories (2002))
- "The Coronet" (1976 - collected in The Incorporated Knight (1987))
- "Spider Love" (1977 - collected in The Incorporated Knight (1987))
- "Eudoric's Unicorn" (1977 - collected in Footprints on Sand (1981) and The Incorporated Knight (1987))
- The Incorporated Knight (1987 collection including "Two Yards of Dragon," "The Coronet," "Eudoric's Unicorn" and "Spider Love," together with new material) (with Catherine Crook de Camp), ISBN 0-671-65435-7
- The Pixilated Peeress (1991) (with Catherine Crook de Camp)

=== W. Wilson Newbury ===
- "Balsamo's Mirror" (1976 - collected in The Purple Pterodactyls (1980) and Years in the Making: the Time-Travel Stories of L. Sprague de Camp (2005))
- "The Lamp" (1975 - collected in The Purple Pterodactyls (1980))
- "Algy" (1976 - collected in The Purple Pterodactyls (1980) and Footprints on Sand (1981))
- "The Menhir" (1977 - collected in The Purple Pterodactyls (1980))
- "Darius" (1977 - collected in The Purple Pterodactyls (1980))
- "United Imp" (1977 - collected in The Purple Pterodactyls (1980))
- "Tiki" (1977 - collected in The Purple Pterodactyls (1980))
- "Far Babylon" (1976 - collected in The Purple Pterodactyls (1980))
- "The Yellow Man" (1978 - collected in The Purple Pterodactyls (1980))
- "A Sending of Serpents" (1979 - collected in The Purple Pterodactyls (1980))
- "The Huns" (1978 - collected in The Purple Pterodactyls (1980))
- "The Purple Pterodactyls" (1976 - collected in The Purple Pterodactyls (1980))
- "Dead Man's Chest" (1977 - collected in The Purple Pterodactyls (1980))
- "The Figurine" (1977 - collected in The Purple Pterodactyls (1980))
- "Priapus" (1977 - collected in The Purple Pterodactyls (1980))
- The Purple Pterodactyls (collection) (1980)

=== Conan ===
==== Novels ====
- The Return of Conan (1957) (with Björn Nyberg)
- Conan of the Isles (1968) (with Lin Carter)
- Conan the Buccaneer (1971) (with Lin Carter)
- Conan the Liberator (1979) (with Lin Carter)
- Conan and the Spider God (1980)
- Conan the Barbarian (1982) (with Lin Carter)

==== Collections ====
- Tales of Conan (collection) (1955) (with Robert E. Howard)
- Conan the Adventurer (collection) (1966) (with Robert E. Howard)
- Conan (collection) (1967) (with Robert E. Howard and Lin Carter)
- Conan the Usurper (collection) (1967) (with Robert E. Howard)
- Conan the Avenger (collection) (1968) (with Björn Nyberg and Robert E. Howard)
- Conan the Freebooter (collection) (1968) (with Robert E. Howard)
- Conan the Wanderer (collection) (1968) (with Robert E. Howard and Lin Carter)
- Conan of Cimmeria (collection) (1969) (with Robert E. Howard and Lin Carter)
- Conan of Aquilonia (collection) (1977) (with Lin Carter)
- Conan the Swordsman (collection) (1978) (with Lin Carter and Björn Nyberg)
- The Treasure of Tranicos (collection) (1980) (with Robert E. Howard)
- The Flame Knife (collection) (1981) (with Robert E. Howard)
- The Conan Chronicles (omnibus collection) (1989) (with Robert E. Howard and Lin Carter)
- The Conan Chronicles 2 (omnibus collection) (1990) (with Robert E. Howard and Lin Carter)
- Sagas of Conan (omnibus collection) (2004) (with Lin Carter and Björn Nyberg)

==== Short stories ====
- "The God in the Bowl" (1952) (with Robert E. Howard)
- "The Treasure of Tranicos" (1953) (with Robert E. Howard)
- "The Frost-Giant's Daughter" (1953) (with Robert E. Howard)
- "The Blood-Stained God" (1955) (with Robert E. Howard)
- "Hawks Over Shem" (1955) (with Robert E. Howard)
- "The Road of the Eagles" (1955) (with Robert E. Howard)
- "The Flame Knife" (1955) (with Robert E. Howard)
- "Drums of Tombalku" (1966) (with Robert E. Howard)
- "The Thing in the Crypt" (1967) (with Lin Carter)
- "The Hall of the Dead" (1967) (with Robert E. Howard)
- "The City of Skulls" (1967) (with Lin Carter)
- "Wolves Beyond the Border" (1967) (with Robert E. Howard)
- "Black Tears" (1968) (with Lin Carter)
- "The Curse of the Monolith" (1968) (with Lin Carter)
- "The Lair of the Ice Worm" (1969) (with Lin Carter)
- "The Castle of Terror" (1969) (with Lin Carter)
- "The Snout in the Dark" (1969) (with Robert E. Howard and Lin Carter)
- "The Witch of the Mists" (1972) (with Lin Carter)
- "Black Sphinx of Nebthu" (1973) (with Lin Carter)
- "Red Moon of Zembabwei" (1974) (with Lin Carter)
- "Shadows in the Skull" (1975) (with Lin Carter)
- "Legions of the Dead" (1978) (with Lin Carter)
- "The People of the Summit" (1970, 1978) (with Björn Nyberg)
- "Shadows in the Dark" (1978) (with Lin Carter)
- "The Star of Khorala" (1978) (with Björn Nyberg)
- "The Gem in the Tower" (1978) (with Lin Carter)
- "The Ivory Goddess" (1978) (with Lin Carter)
- "Moon of Blood" (1978) (with Lin Carter)

=== Other fantasy novels and collections ===
- None But Lucifer (1939, 2002) (with Horace L. Gold)
- Land of Unreason (1942) (with Fletcher Pratt)
- The Carnelian Cube (1948) (with Fletcher Pratt)
- The Undesired Princess (1951), ISBN 0-671-69875-3
- Solomon's Stone (1957)
- The Reluctant Shaman and Other Fantastic Tales (1970)

=== Other fantasy short stories ===
- "Nothing in the Rules" (1939 - collected in The Reluctant Shaman and Other Fantastic Tales (1970), The Best of L. Sprague de Camp (1978) and Aristotle and the Gun and Other Stories (2002))
- "Retirement" (1940)
- "The Hardwood Pile" (1940 - collected in The Reluctant Shaman and Other Fantastic Tales (1970) and The Best of L. Sprague de Camp (1978))
- "Mr. Arson" (1941 - collected in The Undesired Princess (1951) and The Reluctant Shaman and Other Fantastic Tales (1970))
- "The Last Drop" (1941) (with L. Ron Hubbard)
- "The Undesired Princess" (1942 - collected in The Undesired Princess (1951))
- "The Wisdom of the East" (1942 - collected in The Reluctant Shaman and Other Fantastic Tales (1970))
- "The Ghosts of Melvin Pye" (1946 - collected in The Reluctant Shaman and Other Fantastic Tales (1970))
- "The Reluctant Shaman" (1947 - collected in The Reluctant Shaman and Other Fantastic Tales (1970) and The Best of L. Sprague de Camp (1978))

=== Edited ===
==== Fantasy anthologies ====
- Swords and Sorcery (1963)
- The Spell of Seven (1965)
- The Fantastic Swordsmen (1967)
- Warlocks and Warriors (1970)
- 3000 Years of Fantasy and Science Fiction (1972) (with Catherine Crook de Camp)
- Tales Beyond Time (1973) (with Catherine Crook de Camp)

==== Other ====
- The Wolf Leader by Alexandre Dumas, père (1950)
- Conan the Warrior by Robert E. Howard (1967)
- Conan the Conqueror by Robert E. Howard (1967)

== Historical fiction ==
=== Novels ===
- An Elephant for Aristotle (1958)
- The Bronze God of Rhodes (1960), ISBN 0-89865-285-5
- The Dragon of the Ishtar Gate (1961), ISBN 0-89865-196-4
- The Arrows of Hercules (1965)
- The Golden Wind (1969)

=== Short stories ===
- "Captain Leopard" (1996)

== Poetry ==
- Demons and Dinosaurs (1970)
- Heroes and Hobgoblins (1981)
- Phantoms and Fancies (1972)

== Nonfiction ==
=== Biography ===
- Blond Barbarians and Noble Savages (1975)
- Dark Valley Destiny: the Life of Robert E. Howard (1983), ISBN 0-89366-247-X (with Catherine Crook de Camp and Jane Whittington Griffin)
- Literary Swordsmen and Sorcerers (1976)
- Lovecraft: A Biography (1975)
- The Miscast Barbarian: a Biography of Robert E. Howard (1975)
- Time and Chance: an Autobiography (1996)

=== History ===
- The Ancient Engineers (1963)
- Ancient Ruins and Archaeology (1964; vt. Citadels of Mystery (1972)) (with Catherine Crook de Camp), ISBN 1-56619-012-6
- Darwin and His Great Discovery (1972) (with Catherine Crook de Camp)
- The Evolution of Naval Weapons (1947)
- Great Cities of the Ancient World (1972)
- The Great Monkey Trial (1968)
- The Heroic Age of American Invention (1961; vt. Heroes of American Invention (1993))
- Lands Beyond (1952) (with Willy Ley)
- Lost Continents; the Atlantis Theme in History, Science, and Literature (1954)
- Spirits, Stars, and Spells: the Profits and Perils of Magic (1966) (with Catherine Crook de Camp)

=== Science ===
- The Ape-Man Within (1995)
- Antarctic Conquest (1949) (with Finn Ronne, as by Ronne alone)
- The Day of the Dinosaur (1968) (with Catherine Crook de Camp)
- Elephant (1964)
- Energy and Power (1962)
- Engines (1959) illustrated by Jack Coggins
- The Fringe of the Unknown (1983)
- Inventions and Their Management (1937; vt. Inventions, Patents, and Their Management (1959)) (with Alf K. Berle)
- Man and Power (1961)
- The Ragged Edge of Science (1980)
- The Story of Science in America (1967) (with Catherine Crook de Camp)

=== Other ===
- The Conan Reader (1968)
- Rubber Dinosaurs and Wooden Elephants (1996), ISBN 0-89370-354-0
- Science-Fiction Handbook (1953 (revised 1975, with Catherine Crook de Camp))
- Footprints on Sand: a Literary Sampler (with Catherine Crook de Camp). (Advent Publishers, 1981). Collection of tributes to de Camp by various authors, together with selected stories, essays and poems by both de Camps.

=== Edited ===
- The Conan Swordbook (1969)
- The Conan Grimoire (1972)
- The Blade of Conan (1979)
- The Spell of Conan (1980)
- To Quebec and the Stars by H. P. Lovecraft (1976)

=== Gedenkschriften ===
- The Enchanter Completed: A Tribute Anthology for L. Sprague de Camp (2005) edited by Harry Turtledove
