= The Command (short story) =

- Short story by L. Sprague de Camp
- Jack Binder's illustration of the story in Astounding Science-Fiction
- Country: United States
- Language: English
- Genre: Science fiction

Publication
- Published in: Astounding Science-Fiction
- Media type: Print (Magazine)
- Publication date: October, 1938

Chronology
- Series: Johnny Black
—	The Incorrigible

"The Command" is a science fiction story by American writer L. Sprague de Camp. An early treatment of the concept of uplift, it was the first in his Johnny Black series. It was first published in the magazine Astounding Science-Fiction for October, 1938, and first appeared in book form in the hardcover anthology Modern Masterpieces of Science Fiction (World Publishing Co., 1965; reprinted by Hyperion Press, 1974). It later appeared in the paperback anthology Doorway Into Time (Macfadden-Bartell, 1966) and the subsequent de Camp collection The Best of L. Sprague de Camp (Nelson Doubleday, 1978). The story has also been translated into German.

== Plot summary ==
Johnny Black is an American black bear, an experimental animal under the care of Professor Methuen at a biological station near the town of Frederiksted on the island of St. Croix in the U.S. Virgin Islands. He has been injected with "a chemical that lowered the resistance of the synapses between his brain cells, making that complicated process called 'thought' about as easy for Johnny's little brain as a man's big one."

At the beginning of the story, hoping to learn more about the science to which he owes his human intelligence, Johnny is reading an encyclopedia article about chemistry. Finding it hard to puzzle through without Professor Methuen's help, he goes for an amble about the station. The station seems unusually quiet. At the cages housing some of the other animals he finds the birds and monkeys chattering away as usual, but the chimpanzee McGinty in a catatonic state. Trotting over to the kitchen in hope of lunch, he finds the cook Honoria Velez in the same condition, and afterwards the station's scientists, including his patron Methuen, equally afflicted. Only nipping or prodding at them induces them into any movement, and that the minimum required to avoid the stimulus.

The only activity Johnny observes in the vicinity is a number of balloons floating up from the laboratory of Bemis, a botanist unpopular among the other biologists. Investigating, he discovers two strange men inflating and releasing the balloons. As part of an experiment of Bemis's, the balloons carry mold samples into the stratosphere to determine the mutational effects on them of cosmic rays. Johnny attempts to greet the men but is shot at and flees. Later, helping himself to some food back at the kitchen, he hears the strangers drive up. He hides as they order Honoria to load supplies into their truck, a demand with which she complies as if hypnotized. The two return to Bemis's with Johnny secretly following, where they meet two other men, one of them Bemis himself. Johnny decides Bemis must be behind whatever is going on. Eavesdropping confirms this: it is one of the botanist's mutated molds, with will-inhibiting effects specific to higher anthropoids, that has afflicted the biological station. Moreover, its influence is spreading. Bemis expects the whole Earth to be affected within a few weeks, whereupon he and his henchmen will take over the world.

After the conspirators part to attend to various errands, Johnny waylays and kills them separately, then breaks into Bemis's desk in search of the antidote he reasons they must have possessed. He discovers a bottle of potassium iodide, a standard fungicide, and two hypodermic syringes. Clumsily, with teeth and claws, he manages to open the bottle and fill one of the syringes, with which he trots back to the station in search of Methuen. But his attempts to inject Methuen and the other victims fail, as they instinctively resist his efforts. Nor can he order them to do it themselves, as the conspirators might have, his ursine mouth and throat being incapable of human speech. Attempting to direct them via sign language or a laboriously typed message fare no better. Johnny is frustrated: "It seemed absurd–even his little bear's sense of humor realized that–that the spell could be broken by a simple command, that he alone in the whole world knew the command, and that he had no way of giving it."

Finally he has an idea; using the record collection and recording device of one of the scientists, he isolates and re-records the phrase "Now look here!" – which he plays to Methuen, forcing his mentor to pay attention to the message he had previously typed: "PICK UP SIRINGE AND INJECT SOLUTION INTO YOUR UPPER ARM." After reading the message Methuen complies, and gradually emerges from his trance. Afterwards the two of them return to the typewriter, on which Johnny slowly taps out his account of what has happened. Methuen is amazed – "Think of it, Johnny, a bear saving the world!" – and effusively grateful. But any reward will have to wait. First there are the rest of the scientists and people of St. Croix to cure, and then the population of the rest of the Caribbean islands and the mainland.

A week later, beset by boredom in the now mostly-deserted biological station, Johnny attempts the chemistry article once more, still with no one available to help him through the difficult parts.

== Literary significance and criticism ==
"The Command" is one of de Camp's earliest works of fiction, and, together with its successors "The Incorrigible," "The Emancipated" and "The Exalted," it represents his first effort to construct a connected series. Regarding it, de Camp has written "'The Command' had no special inspiration, unless one counts visits to the Central Park Zoo. It was the first of a series of four sequels. I learned the hard way that each story of a series must top its predecessor or it will look less good. In this case, the series ran down; Johnny Black starts out by saving the world and ends up saving his boss's job. It should have been the other way around, but that would have meant planning the whole series in advance. This would have been wise, but I did not then know that."

In the analysis of science fiction historians Alexei and Cory Panshin, the story typified an attitude of de Camp remarkable for the genre of the time: "In the proto-ecological universe projected by de Camp, to be human ... was a natural state of being which we might share with a wide variety of creatures. ... [D]e Camp was capable of imagining what previously would have been thought of as lesser beings–[such as] a black bear experimentally raised to high intelligence in 'The Command' (Astounding, Oct. 1939) ... as being as decent, rational and civilized as most men manage to be, and maybe even more so."

== Adaptations ==
The story was rewritten as the children's story "The Bear Who Saved the World" by the author's wife Catherine Crook de Camp, in which form it was published in the anthology Creatures of the Cosmos (Westminster Press, 1977).
