= Masterpieces of Science Fiction =

1966 anthology edited by Sam Moskowitz

- Dust-jacket illustration
- Editor: Sam Moskowitz
- Language: English
- Genre: Science fiction
- Publisher: World Publishing Co.
- Publication date: 1966
- Publication place: United States
- Media type: Print (Hardback)
- Pages: 552
- OCLC: 712198
- Preceded by: Modern Masterpieces of Science Fiction

Masterpieces of Science Fiction is an anthology of science fiction short stories, edited by Sam Moskowitz. It was first published in hardcover by World Publishing Co. in 1966, and reprinted by Hyperion Press in 1974.

Described as "a treasury of science fiction writing from 1650 to 1935," The book collects eighteen tales by various authors, together with a historical and critical introduction by the editor and two non-fictional pieces relating to "Hans Pfaall" by its author, Edgar Allan Poe. NESFA Press characterizes it as "an excellent historical introduction to the field, including stories from the two centuries ending in about 1940."

== Contents ==
- "Introduction" (Sam Moskowitz)
- "Voyage to the Moon" (Cyrano de Bergerac)
- "The Mortal Immortal" (Mary Shelley)
- "Hans Pfaall—A Tale" (Edgar Allan Poe)
- "Note on "Hans Pfaall" (Edgar Allan Poe)
- "Richard Adams Locke" (Edgar Allan Poe)
- "The Wondersmith" (Fitz-James O'Brien)
- "The Eternal Adam" (Jules Verne and Michel Verne; as by Jules Verne)
- "The Brick Moon" (Edward Everett Hale)
- "Lost in a Comet's Tail; or, Frank Reade, Jr.'s Strange Adventure with His New Air-Ship" (Noname)
- "The Country of the Blind" (H. G. Wells)
- "The Place of Pain" (M. P. Shiel)
- "The Los Amigos Fiasco" (Arthur Conan Doyle)
- "The Resurrection of Jimber-Jaw" (Edgar Rice Burroughs)
- "The People of the Pit" (A. Merritt)
- "System" (Josef Capek and Karel Capek)
- "Extra Sensory Perfection" (Hugo Gernsback)
- "The Colour Out of Space" (H. P. Lovecraft)
- "Humanity on Venus" (Olaf Stapledon)
- "Jungle Journey" (Philip Wylie)
- "The Lotus Eaters" (Stanley G. Weinbaum)
