= Cornzan the Mighty =

1955 short story by L. Sprague de Camp

- Short story by L. Sprague de Camp
- Virgil Finlay's illustration of the story in Future Science Fiction
- Country: United States
- Language: English
- Genre: Science fiction

Publication
- Published in: Future Science Fiction
- Publisher: Columbia Publications, Inc.
- Media type: Print (Magazine)
- Publication date: December, 1955

"Cornzan the Mighty" is a classic science fiction story by L. Sprague de Camp. It was first published under the variant title "Cornzan, the Mighty" in the magazine Future Science Fiction for December, 1955. All later appearances omit the comma. It first appeared in book form in the collection A Gun for Dinosaur and Other Imaginative Tales (Doubleday, 1963). The story has been translated into German.

== Plot summary ==
Protagonist Franklin Hahn is scriptwriter for the television-moumpicture serial "Cornzan the Mighty," mingling and spoofing elements from Edgar Rice Burroughs's Tarzan and Barsoom series, Robert E. Howard's Conan the Barbarian, and Alex Raymond's Flash Gordon. Hahn is smitten with fickle actress Cassia MacDermott, female lead on the show. She has just turned down his latest marriage proposal. The production also faces other difficulties. Everyone is kept on edge by temperamental program manager Mortimer Knight, self-proclaimed genius, who treats all his subordinates like slaves. Only Hahn stands up to him.

If that's not enough, the studio is trying out the new consiline-hypnosis treatment, which conditions the actors to believe they really are the characters they portray. And Sasha, a giant anaconda grown to one hundred feet in length with hormones, has been brought in to provide the menace for the current episode. He's supposed to have drugged into docility, but working with wild animals is always chancy. Scientist Ilya Sorokin, discoverer of consiline, is responsible for both the treatment and the snake.

In the dispensary, Cassia and her co-star Remington Dallas, who plays Cornzan, receive their consiline doses and indoctrination tapes. Series director Eisenhower Lynd tries to keep things light by telling limericks, which Knight later tries to top, drawing a rebuke from Sorokin lest it spoil the actors' indoctrination. They quarrel, Knight threatening to sack Sorokin as soon as the current series is concluded, and the later rejoining he can put the whole studio out of business with his new drug, somnone-beta, that will indoctrinate audiences with scripts from which they can dream their own adventures.

On that note, shooting starts. The Cornzan series is set on a fictional "Counter-Earth" called Anthon; the titular hero, son of earthly scientist John Carson, was orphaned when his parents' spaceship crashed and was raised by native tree-men. In maturity he became a mercenary in the service of the tyrannical King Djurk of Djelibin and fell in love with the king's daughter Lululu, thus incurring the king's wrath. Now he must rescue his love from the jungle temple of Yak, guarded by the giant snake.

The actors playing King Djurk and his henchman Boger tie up Lululu (Cassia) in the temple set as bait to lure rescuing hero Cornzan into the jaws of the snake. The princess dutifully screams as Sasha appears, and Cornzan swings in to save her. They kiss and emote, and then Cornzan incongruously starts spouting lines from Macbeth (Dallas was a Shakespearian actor before landing his current role). The indoctrination was ruined, all right! Evidently, the verses he was hearing did it. As the action proceeds, more and more Macbeth dialog gets interspersed with Cornzan's scripted lines. Shooting will have to cease and the actors given the antidote. But it must be done in keeping with their dream reality, lest their minds be damaged.

"Djurk" and "Boger" having already left for the day, Knight drafts Hahn and Sorokin into their roles to dose Cassia and Dallas. It doesn't go well. "Cornzan," believing Hahn to be Djurk, engages him in swordplay; to prevent the actor from killing Hahn, Sorokin beans him with the device to administer the antidote. Distracted, Dallas pursues Sorokin, and Hahn pursues both. Each vaults over the giant snake Sasha, and Dallas, stumbling, accidentally stabs it. Hahn knocks Dallas out, only to face an angry Sasha. Knight, shouting "If he eats our star it'll ruin the show!" bounds forward; he and Hahn both try to pull Dallas away, but tug in opposite directions. Sasha clamps down on Knight and drags him back screaming. Hahn goes after Sasha with Dallas's sword. Eventually he succeeds in piercing the snake's skull, and it destroys the set in its dying convulsions.

Afterwards, Knight, unfairly blaming Hahn for everything, fires him. Putting their heads together, Hahn and Sorokin realize Knight had already tried to kill them both; Sorokin had thrown the antidote device because he had discovered it empty—the manager had set them up to be killed by the hypnotized Dallas. They can't prove it, though. Feeling Hahn has been fired partly on his account, Sorokin takes him on as a business partner.

A month later, the two are rich; to stay in business, the studio is paying them through the nose to suppress Sorokin's patent on the somnone-beta process. Things are also looking up for Hahn personally. Fickle Cassia had thrown Hahn over for Dallas in the wake of the disaster, only to find her co-star all looks and no intellect. Now she wants Hahn back. Hahn, still smitten and no wiser, blissfully accepts.

== Reception ==
P. Schuyler Miller, commenting on the stories in the collection A Gun for Dinosaur, called this piece "a low comedy of the future entertainment world, [in which] Conan, Tarzan, Flash Gordon and Jungle Jim are properly demolished."

Avram Davidson found the story among most others in A Gun for Dinosaur and Other Imaginative Tales "a great disappointment," feeling the author "[t]ime after time ... gets hold of a great idea—and throws it away in playing for laughs of the feeblest conceivable sort."

== Relation to other works ==
Mind-altering treatments are a common plot feature in de Camp's fiction, some other instances being in his short stories "The Hibited Man" (1949) and "The Guided Man" (1952), and novels The Carnelian Cube (1948), The Virgin of Zesh (1953) and The Glory That Was (1960). The tale also reflects the author's interest in the works parodied by the in-story "television-moumpicture" series, particularly those of Burroughs and Howard.
