= Kaziranga, Assam (poem) =

Poem

Kaziranga, Assam was a poem written by American science fiction and fantasy author L. Sprague de Camp about the Kaziranga National Park. It was first published in 1970 in Demons and Dinosaurs, a poetry collection. The poem was reprinted as Kaziranga in Years in the Making: the Time-Travel Stories of L. Sprague de Camp in 2005.
