= Modern Masterpieces of Science Fiction =

1965 anthology edited by Sam Moskowitz

- Dust-jacket illustration
- Editor: Sam Moskowitz
- Language: English
- Genre: Science fiction
- Publisher: World Publishing Co.
- Publication date: 1965
- Publication place: United States
- Media type: Print (hardback)
- Pages: 518
- OCLC: 1187565
- Followed by: Masterpieces of Science Fiction

Modern Masterpieces of Science Fiction is an anthology of science fiction short stories, edited by Sam Moskowitz. It was first published in hardcover by World Publishing Co. in 1965, and reprinted by Hyperion Press in 1974. It was split into three separate paperback anthologies published by MacFadden-Bartell; Doorway Into Time (1966), The Vortex Blasters (1968) and Microcosmic God (1968); the paperback editions omitted Moskowitz's introduction and the story by Robert Bloch.

The book collects twenty-one tales by various authors, together with a historical and critical introduction by the editor. NESFA Press characterizes it as "an excellent historical introduction to the field, including some of the best stories of the 1940s and 1950s."

== Contents ==
Key: D = reprinted in Doorway Into Time (1966); V = reprinted in The Vortex Blasters (1968); M = reprinted in Microcosmic God (1968).

- "Introduction" (Sam Moskowitz)
- V "The Vortex Blaster" (Edward E. Smith)
- M "Night" (John W. Campbell, Jr.)
- D "A Logic Named Joe" (Murray Leinster)
- V "Requiem" (Edmond Hamilton)
- D "With Folded Hands ..." (Jack Williamson)
- M "Adaptation" (John Wyndham)
- V "The Witness" (Eric Frank Russell)
- D "The Command" (L. Sprague de Camp)
- V "Kindness" (Lester del Rey)
- V "We Also Walk Dogs" (Robert A. Heinlein)
- M "The Enchanted Village" (A. E. van Vogt)
- D "Liar!" (Isaac Asimov)
- M "Microcosmic God" (Theodore Sturgeon)
- M "Huddling Place" (Clifford D. Simak)
- V "Coming Attraction" (Fritz Leiber)
- D "Doorway Into Time" (C. L. Moore)
- V "We Guard the Black Planet!" (Henry Kuttner)
- "The Strange Flight of Richard Clayton" (Robert Bloch)
- M "Wake for the Living" (Ray Bradbury)
- D "Before Eden" (Arthur C. Clarke)
- M "Mother" (Philip José Farmer)

== Reception ==
Algis Budrys in Galaxy Science Fiction said that if one could not obtain Adventures in Space and Time, "one could do a lot worse in representing the field than to pass out a copy of Modern Masterpieces of Science Fiction".
