= Rare Science Fiction =

1963 anthology edited by Ivan Howard

- cover of first edition
- Editor: Ivan Howard
- Cover artist: Eugene Berman
- Language: English
- Genre: Science fiction
- Publisher: Belmont Books
- Publication date: 1963
- Publication place: United States
- Media type: Print (paperback)
- Pages: 173
- OCLC: 07488372
- LC Class: PS648.S3 R364 1963

Rare Science Fiction is an anthology of science fiction short stories edited by Ivan Howard. It was first published in paperback by Belmont Books in January 1963. The collection has been translated into Portuguese.

== Summary ==
The book collects eight short stories and novelettes by various science fiction authors. The stories were previously published from 1954 to 1959 in the Robert A. W. Lowndes-edited science fiction magazines Future Science Fiction, Science Fiction Quarterly, and Science Fiction Stories.

== Contents ==
- "Let's Have Fun" (L. Sprague de Camp) (from Science Fiction Quarterly v. 5, no. 1, May 1957)
- "Do It Yourself" (Milton Lesser) (from Science Fiction Quarterly v. 5, no. 3, November 1957)
- "In Human Hands" (Algis Budrys) (from Science Fiction Stories no. 2, 1954)
- "Protective Camouflage" (Charles V. De Vet) (from Science Fiction Stories v. 5, no. 6, May 1955)
- "Asylum" (Alice Bullock) (from Future Science Fiction v. 5, no. 2, August 1954)
- "Quick Freeze" (Robert Silverberg) (from Science Fiction Quarterly v. 5, no. 1, May 1957)
- "Luck, Inc." (Jim Harmon) (from Science Fiction Stories v. 10, no. 5, November 1959)
- "Ripeness" (M. C. Pease) (from Science Fiction Stories v. 5, no. 4, January 1955)

== Reception ==
P. Schuyler Miller called the anthology "a good and varied lot of eight stories" with "such gems as Alice Bullock's poignant little 'Asylum' or Milton Lesser's wry 'Do it Yourself,'" while noting that "the publisher has done his best to handicap the book with nonsensical cover claims," calling them "'prize-winning' stories" and claiming they were "'appearing for the first time in any book.'" He observed that "I can't recall that any of them ever won a prize, other than an editor's check," and that the de Camp contribution had in fact already appeared in his own collection A Gun for Dinosaur and Other Imaginative Tales (1963).
