= The Glory That Was =

1960 science fiction novel by L. Sprague de Camp

- First edition
- Author: L. Sprague de Camp
- Cover artist: Ed Emshwiller
- Language: English
- Genre: Science fiction
- Publisher: Avalon Books
- Publication date: 1960
- Publication place: United States
- Media type: Print (hardback)
- Pages: vii, 223

The Glory That Was is a science fiction novel by American writer L. Sprague de Camp. It was first published in the science fiction magazine Startling Stories for April, 1952, and subsequently published in book form in hardcover by Avalon Books in 1960 and in paperback by Paperback Library in March 1971. It has since been reprinted in paperback by Ace Books in July 1979 and Baen Books in April 1992, and in trade paperback by Phoenix Pick in September 2014. An E-book edition was published by Gollancz's SF Gateway imprint on September 29, 2011 as part of a general release of de Camp's works in electronic form; a second e-book edition was issued by Phoenix Pick in September 2014. The book has also been translated into Italian, German and Greek.

The book is a tour de force for de Camp, bringing together features of several of the types of fiction he specialized in, including his time travel stories, historical novels, and trademark "domestic science fiction", in which ordinary people encounter the extraordinary—though as it turns out no time travel is involved, it is not a historical novel, and the "ordinary" people live in the twenty-seventh century.

Two of de Camp's friends and colleagues, science fiction writers Robert A. Heinlein and Isaac Asimov, with whom he had worked on military research during World War II, were involved in the book in different ways. It features a laudatory introduction by Heinlein and is dedicated to Asimov, whom de Camp stated "helped to push this one over the hump." Asimov recorded some vivid impressions of the author's research for the book in his own introduction to de Camp's short story collection The Continent Makers and Other Tales of the Viagens (1953).

== Plot summary ==
Twenty-seventh century Earth is united by a worldwide democratic government presided over by a constitutional monarch, though the former is veering toward totalitarianism and the latter is a megalomaniac. To neutralize the World Emperor the power-hungry prime minister has ceded to him control of Greece for use in a mysterious secret project. Now Greece is surrounded by a force field cutting it off from the rest of the world, and people of Greek descent everywhere have vanished, presumably spirited away to the isolated region by the Emperor's agents.

One such kidnapped citizen is Thalia, wife of classical scholar Wiyem Flin. Anxious to get her back, he recruits his friend, magazine editor Knut Bulnes, into a desperate attempt to penetrate the force barrier. Bulnes, hoping to obtain an exclusive story on the Emperor's mysterious project, agrees. The two succeed, sailing a boat through the barrier when it is temporarily disrupted by a storm.

Inside the force field, Flin and Bulnes are astounded to find themselves not in 27th century Greece, but to all appearances the Classical Greece of Pericles and the Peloponnesian War. Pretending to be foreign philosophers, they establish themselves in Athens as they attempt to unravel the mystery, and begin to discover that all is not as it seems; the wife of the playwright Euripides, for instance, appears to be Thalia, though she does not recognize Flin and has no memory of her former life.

After meeting the astronomer Meton, Flin and Bulnes discover that the north celestial pole is where it is expected to be in the twenty-seventh century, proving that they cannot really be in ancient Greece. Bulnes discovers a hidden subterranean building containing modern machinery and people speaking twenty-seventh century language. The pair eventually deduce that the entire country is an elaborate charade, with most of the inhabitants being controlled by a "mind conditioning" device that erases their memories and deceives them into believing they are living in ancient Greece. They decide to reveal this fact to Pericles by masquerading as an oracle of the god Apollo. Pericles appears for their meeting but when they reveal their news, he attempts to shoot them with a modern gun. Only then do they realize that Pericles is actually the World Emperor himself.

Escaping, they discover an elaborate system of machinery and antennas hidden in the colossal statue of Athene Promachos. They enlist the aid of Kleon, a political opponent of Pericles. They are surprised to discover that he is actually the Emperor's brother, although under conditioning like most of the people and unaware of his true identity. With the help of Kleon and his supporters, they start a fire at the Athene Promachos statue, destroying the conditioning machinery and restoring the memories of the people. Although the Emperor kills his brother and is himself killed in the ensuing melee, Flin is finally reunited with his wife Thalia.

== Relationship to previous works ==
There are hints of the concept of using brainwashed people to reenact the past in some of de Camp's other works. In his science fiction novel Lest Darkness Fall (1939), the main character considers the possibility that instead of being thrown back in time he has found himself in a Rome that Benito Mussolini has forced to imitate the 6th century, but dismisses the idea as impractical. In the fantasy novel The Carnelian Cube (1948) by de Camp and his collaborator Fletcher Pratt an actual reenactment of the Biblical siege of Samaria by the Assyrians is performed, directed by astrology-guided archaeologists using drafted and hypnotized participants. And in the story "Cornzan the Mighty" (1955) actors are conditioned to believe the scenario they are performing is real.

== Reception ==
Galaxy Science Fiction's Floyd C. Gale rated The Glory That Was three stars out of five, stating that "there isn't a belly laugh in the book, there are plenty of chuckles and unostentatious erudition".
