= The Scarlatti Inheritance =

1971 novel by Robert Ludlum

- First edition
- Author: Robert Ludlum
- Language: English
- Genre: Thriller novel
- Publisher: World Publishing
- Publication date: 1971
- Publication place: United States
- Media type: Print (hardback & paperback)
- Pages: 358
- ISBN: 9780246640550

The Scarlatti Inheritance is the first of 27 thriller novels written (the last four of them left in the form of manuscripts, later finalized by ghost writers) by American author Robert Ludlum.

== Premise ==
In Washington during World War II, word is received that an elite member of the Nazi High Command is willing to defect and divulge information that will shorten the war. But his defection entails the release of the ultra-top-secret file on the Scarlatti Inheritance – a file whose contents will destroy many of the Western world's greatest and most illustrious reputations if they are made known. From there, the book takes itself back a few decades, and tells the story of a corrupt American soldier, his billionaire mother, and an agent working for one of the smallest secret service departments in the world.

== Media adaptations ==
James Bond producer Albert R. Broccoli purchased film rights either before or shortly after publication. Broccoli asked Ludlum to write the script, but Ludlum was reluctant. Ludlum, who had film and theatre experience, said "I didn't leave that crowd of ocelots to go back into it." Ludlum also claimed that Broccoli sought revisions in the agreement.

Dalton Trumbo was subsequently signed to write the script and worked on it in 1975. Documentary filmmaker Saul Swimmer would produce and direct.

Lew Grade optioned the film rights in the late 1970s hoping to make a movie starring Ingrid Bergman (with whom Grade had just made Autumn Sonata). However Grade says Bergman decided to pull out because of the long production schedule that would be involved and the film did not enter production. "A pity as she would have been wonderful in it," wrote Grade.

No film version was ever made.
