= The People of the Pit =

- Short story by A. Merritt
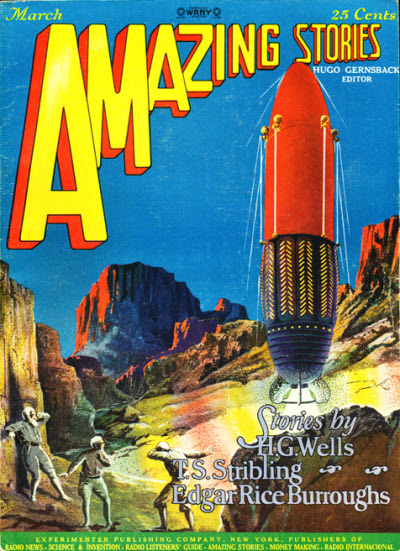
- Cover to Amazing Stories, March 1927

Text available at Wikisource
- Country: United States
- Language: English
- Genre: Fantastic horror

Publication
- Published in: All-Story Weekly
- Publisher: Frank Munsey
- Media type: Print
- Published in English: January 5, 1918

The People of the Pit (1918) is a short story by American writer A. Merritt.

== Plot ==
Two gold prospectors are in Alaska to investigate a mountain range known as The Hand, which is supposed to have gold running down the middle. One night, when it is in sight, a beam of light shoots into the sky, and an injured man crawls into their camp. He was also a prospector, and tells them a fantastic tale of his experience with the People of the Pit.

== Setting ==
The story is set "three hundred miles above the first great bend of the Kuskokwim toward the Yukon", in the Kuskokwim Mountains.

A travel book titled In the Alaskan wilderness had been published the previous year by George Byron Gordon, with maps and photographs of the region.

== Influence ==
The story has been cited as a possible inspiration of Lovecraft's novella At the Mountains of Madness.

== Publishing history ==
- All-Story Weekly, January 5, 1918
- Amazing Stories, March 1927, illustrated by Martin Gambee.
- The Third Omnibus of Crime, 1935
- The Fox Woman and Other Stories, 1949
- Masterpieces of Science Fiction, 1966
- The Fantastic Pulps, 1975
- The Road to Science Fiction, Volume 2: From Wells to Heinlein, 1979
- Masterpieces of Terror and the Unknown, 1993
- The Weird, 2011
