= Science Fiction of the Thirties =

- Cover illustration of Science Fiction of the Thirties
- Author: edited by Damon Knight
- Cover artist: Howard V. Brown
- Language: English
- Genre: Science fiction
- Publisher: Bobbs-Merrill
- Publication date: 1976
- Publication place: United States
- Media type: Print (hardcover)
- Pages: 468 pp
- ISBN: 0-672-52087-7

Science Fiction of the Thirties is an anthology of science fiction short stories edited by Damon Knight. It was first published in hardcover by Bobbs-Merrill in January 1976; a book club edition was issued simultaneously by the same publisher together with the Science Fiction Book Club, and a trade paperback edition by Avon Books in March 1977.

The book collects eighteen tales by various authors originally published in the 1930s and exemplifying American magazine science fiction of that decade, together with a foreword and three essays on the period by the editor, and a bibliography. The stories were originally published in Astounding Stories and Amazing Stories, the premier science fiction magazines of the time. The book reproduces period illustrations that accompanied the stories' original appearances by H. W. Wesso, Leo Morey, Paul Orban, Howard V. Brown, Elliott Dold, Jr., Thompson, and Charles Schneeman.

== Contents ==
- "Foreword" (Damon Knight)
- "The Early Years" (Damon Knight)
  - "Out Around Rigel" (Astounding Stories, December 1931) (Robert H. Wilson)
  - "The Fifth-Dimension Catapult" (Astounding Stories of Super-Science, January 1931) (Murray Leinster)
  - "Into the Meteorite Orbit" (Amazing Stories, December 1933) (Frank K. Kelly)
  - "The Battery of Hate" (Amazing Stories, November 1933) (John W. Campbell, Jr.)
- "The Middle Period" (Damon Knight)
  - "The Wall" (Astounding Stories, May 1934) (Howard W. Graham)
  - "The Lost Language" (Amazing Stories, January 1934) (David H. Keller)
  - "The Last Men" (Astounding Stories, August 1934) (Frank Belknap Long, Jr.)
  - "The Other" (Astounding Stories, December 1934) (Howard W. Graham)
  - "The Mad Moon" (Astounding Stories, December 1935) (Stanley G. Weinbaum)
  - "Davey Jones' Ambassador" (Astounding Stories, December 1935) (Raymond Z. Gallun)
  - "Alas, All Thinking" (Astounding Stories, June 1935) (Harry Bates)
  - "The Time Decelerator" (Astounding Stories, July 1936) (A. Macfadyen, Jr.)
  - "The Council of Drones" (Amazing Stories, October 1936) (William K. Sonnemann)
- "The End" (Damon Knight)
  - "Seeker of Tomorrow" (Astounding Stories, July 1937) (Eric Frank Russell and Leslie T. Johnson)
  - "Hyperpilosity" (Astounding Science-Fiction, April 1938) (L. Sprague de Camp)
  - "Pithecanthropus Rejectus" (Astounding Stories, January 1938) (Manly Wade Wellman)
  - "The Merman" (Astounding Science-Fiction, December 1938) (L. Sprague de Camp)
  - "The Day Is Done" (Astounding Science-Fiction, May 1939) (Lester del Rey)
- "Bibliography"
