= The Great Fetish =

1978 novel by Lyon Sprague de Camp

- Cover of the first edition.
- Author: L. Sprague de Camp
- Cover artist: Gary Friedman
- Language: English
- Genre: Science fiction
- Publisher: Doubleday
- Publication date: 1978
- Publication place: United States
- Media type: Print (Hardback)
- Pages: ii, 177
- ISBN: 0-385-13139-9
- OCLC: 4378679
- Dewey Decimal: 813/.5/2
- LC Class: PZ3.D3555 Gr PS3507.E2344

The Great Fetish is a science fiction novel by American writer L. Sprague de Camp. It was first published in Isaac Asimov's Science Fiction Magazine in two parts, as "Heretic in a Balloon" and "The Witches of Manhattan", in the issues for winter, 1977, and January/February, 1978, respectively. It was subsequently published in book form in hardcover by Doubleday in 1978 and in paperback by Pocket Books in 1980. An E-book edition was published by Gollancz's SF Gateway imprint on September 29, 2011 as part of a general release of de Camp's works in electronic form. It has also been translated into German.

== Plot ==
The book is both an adventure story and a satire on the scientific dispute over Creationism. It is set on Kforri, an earthlike planet of the star Muphrid (Eta Boötis). There descendants of space travelers from Earth have reverted to a pre-technological society. The truth of their origin has faded into legend, and as a result the story of the space voyage and the scientific theory of evolution have become competing accounts of the genesis of humanity. In an ironic reversal, the orthodox view, as established by the Holy Syncretic Church, holds that man evolved from the native animals of Kforri. Skeptics against the received dogma, known as Descensionists or Anti-Evolutionists, are more open to the spaceflight theory, which the Church views as heresy. De Camp portrays the beliefs of the Church as a ludicrous mishmash of half-remembered Earth faiths and history: its deities, for instance, include "the holy trinity of Yez, Moham, and Bud," "Yustinn, god of law," "Napoin, god of war," "Kliopat, goddess of love," "Niuto, god of wisdom," and "Froit, maker of souls."

Marko Prokopiu, a schoolteacher in Skudra the conservative country of Vizantia, has been converted to Anti-Evolutionism by his houseguest, travel writer Chet Mongamri of Anglonia, and as the story opens is found guilty in court having taught the heresy to his students. While he is incarcerated, his wife Petronela runs off with Mongamri, so his mother engineers his escape from prison and instructs him to pursue and kill them to redeem his honor. Marko tracks his victims to the university town of Thiné, but is knocked unconscious in a riot before he can murder them. His old professor hides him from the authorities and introduces him to the Anglonian philosopher Boert Halran, who is in Vizantia to acquire sealant for his experimental hot air balloon. Marko and Halran end up traveling together to Anglonia across the desert country of Arabistan, the former still on the trail of the fugitives, and the latter to work on his balloon. On the way Halran persuades Marko his vendetta is immoral and convinces him to abandon it, while Marko saves the philosopher's life when their caravan is attacked by bandits.

Marko finds Anglonia a perplexing country. Niok, the chief city, seems populated mostly by genial criminals. The country as a whole is permissive in comparison to Vizantia, with divorce easy and common and children outrageously spoiled. Mongamri and Petronela have found the perfect refuge, for in Anglonia their transgression is no crime, while any attempt at vengeance would be. Regardless, and despite his pledge to Halran, Marko remains determined to confront the fugitives, for an explanation if nothing else. Locating Mongamri's home in the Anglonian city of Lann, he pays them a call, but is attacked by Mongamri, who assumes he still intends to murder them. Marko is forced to kill Mongamri in self-defense as Petronela flees. Realizing he has just made Lann too hot for himself, Marko seeks sanctuary with Halran, who takes him on as his assistant in completing his balloon. The plan is to spirit Marko out of Lann on its first flight and then fly onward to Vien in Eropia, where Halran intends to present the balloon at a philosophical convention.

A storm blows the balloon off course, over the Medranian Sea, and the pair is forced to land on the island of Afka to resupply. The Afkans are hostile to all outsiders, but are persuaded to spare their lives and release them in return for being taught how to build a super weapon (a ballista) to help defend their island. Marko and Halran resume their flight, only to be again forced down on Mnaenn, the island of women, where an all-female society of witches adhering to the cult of Einstein jealously guards the Great Fetish, said to hold the truth regarding human origins. Sentenced to death for trespassing, the two are set free by Sinthi, a disaffected witch attracted to Marko. During their escape they stumble across the Great Fetish, which turns out to be a large set of boxes containing oddly mottled metallic cards. Marko takes some of them, after which the two seize the ruling Stringiarch as a hostage until their balloon is refueled and reinflated, and take off again.

This time they reach their destination, the country of Eropia, where on landing they are conducted to Vien for the philosophical convention. There, however, they themselves in yet another predicament; Alzander Mirando, dictator of Eropia, has decided to settle the Evolutionist/Descensionist controversy once and for all by having the issue debated before him by the gathered philosophers and Eropia's churchmen; all members of the losing side will be executed.

While awaiting this gloomy prospect, the philosophers continue their convention. In addition to Halran's balloon, the latest wonders are the discoveries in optics by Dama and Ryoske Chimei, two brothers from Mingkwo who have invented a telescope and microscope. One of Marko's cards is examined under the microscope and discovered to contain printing in Old Anglonian (English) too small to be seen by the naked eye; the cards are in fact microcards containing a library of knowledge from Earth. An expert in Old Anglonian begins translating them, and finds that there is truth to both theories of human origins; humanity did evolve from lower animals, but on Earth, not Kforri, and did indeed arrive on Kforri by spacecraft. This is not likely to be the solution Mirando wants, but Marko, inspired by the escape from Mnaenn, has a plan.

When Mirando arrives for the debate, he is offered an ascent in Halran's balloon. Accepting, he quickly discovers himself Marko's captive, his safety dependent on all the philosophers being escorted to the coast and given charge of a steamship (another recent invention). The scheme goes without a hitch, and all the members of the convention proceed by sea to Mnaenn, which they seize from the witches. More about the lost history of Kforri is discovered from the witches and the archive of the Great Fetish. They learn the planet gained its name from that given by the discovering expedition (K40 becoming Kforri), and that the expedition members disagreed and dispersed, eventually forming nations with cultures and languages derived from their native ones. For instance, the name of Marko's homeland of Vizantia is derived from Byzantium and the Island of Mnaenn from Manhattan. The names of other countries and locales are also corruptions of earthly originals, including Eropia (Europe), Afka (Africa), Lann (London), Niok (New York), and Vien (Vienna).

The philosophers intend to found on Mnaenn a philosophical republic and translate and disseminate the data from the card archive of the Great Fetish for the benefit of all humanity, eventually hoping to build spaceships to travel back to Earth. Marko, however, is more interested in pursuing his interest in Sinthi, Petronela having divorced him after the accidental slaying of her lover Mongamri.

== Relations to other works ==
De Camp previously wrote about the actual struggle between science and creationism in The Great Monkey Trial (1968), a non-fiction account of the 1925 test case against Tennessee's Butler Act, which made the teaching of human evolution in that state illegal.

His portrayal of the parental permissiveness and juvenile delinquency that disturb Marko in Lann echoes previous criticisms made in his 1957 short story "Let's Have Fun." Several of his W. Wilson Newbury stories, published around the same time as The Great Fetish, also criticize unruly young people and their elders who fail to take charge.

== Reception ==
Critical response to the novel ranged from mixed to negative. Kirkus Reviews called it "[f]limsy and pointless." Publishers Weekly, while characterizing it as a "happy combination of gentle satire and light adventure," and its author as "an old pro" who "can be relied upon to entertain and amuse," felt that, notwithstanding, "in this case, he has nothing new to show us." Donna J. McColman, writing for Library Journal, found the book an "attempt at satire [that] falls flat. Impossible to take seriously, [and not] particularly funny or telling as a spoof of the sword and sorcery genre ... The author uses all the contrivances of the genre, but the book merely comes across as a poorly written example, not a takeoff." Mel Gilden in the Los Angeles Times thought it "an adventure with a thin overlay of science-fiction ... "lack[ing] energy and excitement [with] [t]he climactic revelation ... telegraphed from the beginning." He singled out for criticism the hero's "escape from jail, using—I swear—a file baked into a cake by his mother," and the author's "juvenile mock-Victorian writing style."

These mainstream critiques were echoed within the genre. Frederick Patten in Science Fiction & Fantasy Book Review called the book "amusing enough in its own right, but extremely lightweight when compared to de Camp's best" works, among which he counted The Tritonian Ring, The Hand of Zei, and The Fallible Fiend. He rated it "all froth and no substance ... [a]n enjoyable time-killer." More positively, he did consider it "all great fun: Marko makes an amusingly reluctant hero, buffeted by fate from one exasperating contretemps to another. De Camp gleefully lampoons many of the more ridiculous aspects of our own culture, from campus radicalism to New York City to religious dogmatism." He felt its "light humor and iconoclasm should make the novel especially popular with high school and college readers."
