= In-Group =

1952 science fiction short story by L. Sprague de Camp

- Short story by L. Sprague de Camp
- Al Williamson's illustration of the story in Marvel Science Fiction
- Country: United States
- Language: English
- Genre: Science fiction

Publication
- Published in: Marvel Science Fiction
- Publisher: Stadium Publishing Corporation
- Media type: Print (Magazine)
- Publication date: May 1952

"In-Group" is a science fiction short story by L. Sprague de Camp. It was first published in the magazine Marvel Science Fiction for May, 1952. and later reprinted in the magazine Skyworlds for February 1978. It first appeared in book form in the collection A Gun for Dinosaur and Other Imaginative Tales (Doubleday, 1963). The story has been translated into Italian and German.

== Plot summary ==
Soldier of fortune Ali Moyang, leader of a band of Terran treasure hunters in the jungles of the planet Kterem, rescues archaeologist Charles Bertin, whose helicopter had crashed during an aerial survey. Moyang learns Bertin has located the site of the ancient ruins of Zhovacim, the very place he himself had been seeking to loot it of its historical tablets, made of gold. Moreover, the archaeologist has established good relations with the notoriously touchy Kteremian natives. To Moyang, Bertin represents an unprecedented stroke of luck.

Bertin, distressed at the thought of the tablets' loss to science, attempts to talk Moyang out of his raid. Failing, he agrees under duress to serve as intermediary between the treasure hunters and the native Kteremians of the village closest to Zhovacim. But he has an ace up his sleeve in his knowledge of Kteremian culture and psychology.

The expedition arrives in the village at the time of the annual mating dance, a period in which ethnic identity and pride are at their peak, and strangers or outsiders are regarded as lower creatures. Accordingly, the aliens seize and sacrifice the Terrans, sparing Bertin only because they know him. The archeologist confesses to Moyang just before the latter is butchered that he couldn't be certain he himself would be spared, but deemed it worth risking his own life to preserve the wonders of Zhovacim.

== Reception ==
P. Schuyler Miller, commenting on the stories in the collection A Gun for Dinosaur, characterized most of them, including this piece, as "distinctly late-model de Camp, commenting on the current scene--and especially the suburban, or more properly exurban scene--by projecting it into the future, where its "things of custom" appear in all their incongruity. As the plot grows simpler and simpler, the settings and commentary carry more and more of the load, in the manner of an off-Broadway play. And there will be those who say the author has written himself into most of his rather put-upon heroes-in-spite-of-themselves." Commenting on this story, he notes that it "suggests that on the other side of space archeologists may release some of their inhibitions."

Avram Davidson found the story among most others in A Gun for Dinosaur and Other Imaginative Tales "a great disappointment," feeling the author "[t]ime after time ... gets hold of a great idea—and throws it away in playing for laughs of the feeblest conceivable sort."

== Relation to other works ==
The plot feature of future scientists investigating past ecosystems and cultures is a common one in de Camp's writings, some other instances being his short stories "Employment" (1939), "Living Fossil" (1939), the Viagens Interplanetarias tales "The Colorful Character" (1949), The Bones of Zora (1983), The Stones of Nomuru (1988), and The Venom Trees of Sunga (1992), "The Ordeal of Professor Klein" (1952), "The Saxon Pretender" (1952), "Impractical Joke" (1956), the Reginald Rivers time travel tales beginning with "A Gun for Dinosaur" (1956), and The Great Fetish (1978). "Living Fossil" also features the resolving device of a scientist engineering the death of a greedy antagonist in defense of science.
