= Red Moon of Zembabwei =

Short story by Lyon Sprague de Camp

- Short story by L. Sprague de Camp and Lin Carter
- Country: United States
- Language: English
- Genre: Fantasy

Publication
- Published in: Conan of Aquilonia
- Publication type: Collection
- Publisher: Ace Books
- Media type: Print (Paperback)
- Publication date: 1977
- Series: Conan the Barbarian

"Red Moon of Zembabwei" is a short story by American writers L. Sprague de Camp and Lin Carter, featuring the fictional sword and sorcery hero Conan the Barbarian created by Robert E. Howard. It was first published in the July 1974 issue of the magazine Fantastic, and first appeared in book form in the Ace Books paperback collection Conan of Aquilonia in May 1977, which was reprinted several times through 1994. The first British edition was published by Sphere Books in October 1978.

== Plot summary ==
Following his encounter with Thoth-Amon in Stygia during the events of "Black Sphinx of Nebthu", King Conan of Aquilonia pursues his arch nemesis to the kingdom of Zembabwei. Thoth-Amon has taken refuge here with the aid of Nenaunir, an evil wizard who has usurped the throne from his own twin brother.

Conan, who has entered the city to negotiate his enemy's surrender, is ignorant of this state of affairs until he finds himself thrown in the dungeon with the rightful king, who has been deposed and tortured by Nenaunir.

Murzio, a spy from the Aquilonian army, is able to slip through the sewers of Zembabwei to reach the dungeon, but is unable to release Conan. However, he is able to open the gates of the city to the Aquilonian soldiers. In the meantime, Conan and Conn are to be sacrificed to the evil serpent-god Set, or Damballah, as the deity is known in Zembabwei.

Prince Conn saves the day by killing Nenaunir and nullifying the earthly materialization of Damballah. Having lost his sanctuary, Thoth-Amon flees south on a flying wyvern.

== Adaptations ==
Howard's story "The Grisly Horror" was published in the magazine Weird Tales (Feb 1935) and was later renamed "The Moon of Zimbabwei" (the inspiration for the de Camp/Carter version). It was adapted by Marvel Comics as a Conan story in Conan the Barbarian #28 ("Moon of Zembabwei", July 1973) a year before the publication of de Camp/Carter.

| Preceded by "Black Sphinx of Nebthu" | Complete Conan Saga (William Galen Gray chronology) | Succeeded by "Shadows in the Skull" |
