= World Publishing Company =

American publishing company (1902-1980)

- Parent company: Times Mirror Company (1962–1974); Collins Publishers (1974–1980)
- Status: defunct 1980; 46 years ago, some assets acquired by Putnam Publishing Group and Simon & Schuster
- Predecessor: Commercial Bookbinding Co.
- Founded: 1902; 124 years ago
- Founder: Alfred H. Cahen
- Country of origin: United States
- Headquarters location: Cleveland; New York City
- Key people: Ben Zevin, William Targ
- Publication types: Books
- Nonfiction topics: Reference, Religion, Politics, Sports, Philosophy
- Fiction genres: Mystery, Popular fiction
- Imprints: Tower Books

The World Publishing Company was an American publishing company. The company published genre fiction, trade paperbacks, children's literature, nonfiction books, textbooks, Bibles, and dictionaries, primarily from 1940 to 1980. Authors published by World Publishing Company include Ruth Nanda Anshen, Michael Crichton, Simone de Beauvoir, Robert Ludlum, Sam Moskowitz, Ayn Rand, Rex Stout, Gay Talese, and Lin Yutang. Originally headquartered in Cleveland, the company later added an office in New York City. The company's Cleveland headquarters were located in the Caxton Building.

World Publishing was notable for publishing the first edition of Webster's New World Dictionary in 1951, which contained 142,000 entries, said to be the largest American desk dictionary available at the time. The company also had a vibrant children's book division, and published the first edition of Eric Carle's The Very Hungry Caterpillar in 1969.

World Publishing Company is not related to the original owners of the Omaha World-Herald or Tulsa World (also called "World Publishing Co.").

== History ==
Polish immigrant Alfred H. Cahen founded the Commercial Bookbinding Co. in Cleveland, Ohio, in 1902, expanding and adding a printing plant by 1912. In 1928 Cahen bought out his largest competitor, New York's World Syndicate Publishing Co., officially taking on the name World Publishing Co. in 1935. (At that point, the company added an office in New York City.)

At the time the largest publisher of the King James Bible, in 1940 Cahen's son-in-law, Ben Zevin, expanded the company's output by publishing inexpensive editions of classic literature, which were sold in variety stores and drugstores as well as bookstores. Under Zevin's leadership, in 1940 World Publishing introduced the hugely popular Tower Books imprint: a 49-cent line of hardcovers which featured such authors as mystery writer Rex Stout. (This "Tower Books" was not related to the Tower Publications imprint that operated from 1958 to 1981.) From 1942 to 1964 William Targ worked as an editor for World Publishing, eventually becoming editor-in-chief. As time passed, World Publishing expanded its repertoire to all types of fiction, nonfiction, sports, the classics, and philosophy.

The Times Mirror Company acquired World Publishing in 1962. By this time, World Publishing was producing 12 million books a year, one of only three American publishers to produce that much volume. In 1974, the Times Mirror Co. sold World Publishing to the U.K.-based Collins Publishers, with the trade publishing remaining with Times Mirror's New American Library subsidiary.

In 1980 Collins broke up World Publishing, selling its children's line to the Putnam Publishing Group, the dictionary line to Simon and Schuster, and otherwise ridding itself of World's assets.

== Titles published (selected) ==
- Anshen, Ruth Nanda and Pierre Teilhard de Chardin. Letters to Two Friends, 1926-1952 (Perspectives in Humanism series)
- Bassett, James. Harm's Way (1962)
- Behn, Harry The Faraway Lurs (1963)
- Carle, Eric. The Very Hungry Caterpillar (1969)
- Chandler, Raymond. Time to Kill. (1946) ASIN B0007ED26I
- Crichton, Michael (writing as John Lange). The Venom Business (1969)
- Cope, Myron. The Game That Was: The Early Days of Pro Football (1970)
- de Beauvoir, Simone. The Mandarins (1954) — first English-language edition
- Dreiser, Theodore. Trilogy of Desire (1972)
- Hammett, Dashiell
  - Blood Money (1943) — hardcover edition of Bestseller Mystery B40 (Tower imprint)
  - Dashiell Hammett's Mystery Omnibus (1944) — includes The Maltese Falcon and The Glass Key
  - The Adventures of Sam Spade and Other Stories (1945) — hardcover edition of Bestseller Mystery B50
- Havinghurst, Walter (1958). Vein of Iron: The Pickands-Mather Story
- Hobsbawm, Eric
  - The Age of Revolution: Europe 1789–1848 (1962)
  - Bandits (1969)
- Höss, Rudolph. Commandant of Auschwitz: The Autobiography of Rudolf Höß. Translated by Constantine FitzGibbon (1959)
- Kazin, Alfred, ed. F. Scott Fitzgerald: The Man and His Work (1951)
- Kramer, Jerry & Dick Schaap. Instant Replay: The Green Bay Diary of Jerry Kramer (1968)
- Lowry, Malcolm. October Ferry to Gabriola (1970)
- Ludlum, Robert
  - The Scarlatti Inheritance (1971)
  - The Osterman Weekend (1972)
- Mailer, Norman. Miami and the Siege of Chicago (1968)
- Moskowitz, Sam, ed.
  - Modern Masterpieces of Science Fiction (1965)
  - Seekers of Tomorrow: Masters of Modern Science Fiction (1965)
  - Masterpieces of Science Fiction (1966)
  - Explorers of the Infinite: Shapers of Science Fiction (1966)
- Norton, Andre. Storm Over Warlock (1960)
- Peyton, K. M. The Edge of the Cloud (1969)
- Rabi, Isidor Isaac. Science: The Center of Culture (1970)
- Rand, Ayn. The Romantic Manifesto (1969)
- Sauvage, Leo. The Oswald Affair (1966, 1967)
- Scott-Heron, Gil. The Vulture (1970)
- Southern, Terry. Blue Movie (1970)
- Talese, Gay
  - The Kingdom and the Power (1969)
  - Honor Thy Father (1971)
- Thompson, Bard. Liturgies of the Western Church (1961)
- Westlake, Donald E. (writing as Richard Stark) Lemons Never Lie (1971)
- Twain, Mark, The Adventures of Huckleberry Finn (1947).
- Woodcock, George. Anarchism (1962)
- Wright, Richard
  - The Color Curtain (1956)
  - Eight Men (1961)

== Book series ==
- Forum Books
- Holly Books
- Illustrated Gift Editions
- Jewish Publication Society Series (jointly published with Jewish Publication Society of America)
- Living Age Books
- Living Library
- Meridian Books (also published by The Noonday Press)
- Meridian Giants
- Perspectives in Humanism
- Shepherd Books
- Tower Books
- World Books
- World Foreign Language Record Series

== Imprints ==
- International Fiction Library
- Meridian Books
