= Conan of Aquilonia =

Book by Lyon Sprague de Camp

- Cover of first edition
- Author: L. Sprague de Camp and Lin Carter
- Cover artist: Boris Vallejo
- Language: English
- Series: Conan the Barbarian
- Genre: Sword and sorcery
- Publisher: Ace Books
- Publication date: 1977
- Publication place: United States
- Media type: Print (Paperback)
- Pages: 171
- ISBN: 0-441-11682-5
- OCLC: 3068744

Conan of Aquilonia is a collection of four linked fantasy short stories by American writers L. Sprague de Camp and Lin Carter featuring Robert E. Howard's sword and sorcery hero Conan the Barbarian. The stories were originally published in Fantastic in August 1972, July 1973, July 1974, and February 1975. The collected stories were intended for book publication by Lancer Books, but this edition never appeared due to Lancer's bankruptcy, and the first book edition was issued in paperback by Ace Books in paperback in May 1977. It was reprinted by Ace in July 1981, April 1982, November 1982, August 1983, July 1984, 1986, June 1991, and April 1994. The first British edition was published by Sphere Books in October 1978, and reprinted in July 1988. The book has also been translated into French.

== Contents ==
- "Introduction" (L. Sprague de Camp)
- "The Witch of the Mists" (L. Sprague de Camp and Lin Carter)
- "Black Sphinx of Nebthu" (L. Sprague de Camp and Lin Carter)
- "Red Moon of Zembabwei" (L. Sprague de Camp and Lin Carter)
- "Shadows in the Skull" (L. Sprague de Camp and Lin Carter)

== Plot summary ==
In his late 50s, King Conan of Aquilonia engages in his final struggle with his arch-foe, the black magician Thoth-Amon of Stygia, servant of the evil god Set. First, Conan must journey into Hyperborea and rescue his kidnapped son, Prince Conn, from an unholy alliance between Thoth-Amon and the witch queen, Louhi. Next, Conan and Conn carry the struggle to their enemy's stronghold in Stygia itself at the head of an invading army, with the aid of a white druid named Diviatix. Pursuing their defeated foe southward, they confront him again, first in the kingdom of Zembabwei and, at last, near the very edge of the world, where Conan and Thoth-Amon face each other in a final astral duel.

Conan of Aquilonia depicts the coming of age of Conan's son, Conn. In the beginning, Conn is still very much of a boy and is afraid of a heavy belting which he could expect from his father for disobedience. By the end, he is already a seasoned warrior, who took part in various kinds of battle, escaped from capture, avoided imminent death, saved his father's life, and has a crucial role in the final defeat of Conan's old enemy Thoth-Amon—making him ready to succeed as King Conan II (which he would seven years hence, in Conan of the Isles).

== Reception ==
Critic Don D'Ammassa writes "Although this is billed as a novel it is actually a series of four novelettes set during Conan's tenure as king of Aquilonia. ... These all felt lightweight, as though they were meant for younger readers."

Preceded by Conan the Avenger	Lancer/Ace Conan series (chronological order)	Succeeded by Conan of the Isles
