= Throwback (short story) =

- Short story by L. Sprague de Camp
- Edd Cartier's illustration of the story in Astounding Science-Fiction
- Country: United States
- Language: English
- Genre: Science fiction short story

Publication
- Published in: Astounding Science Fiction
- Publisher: Street & Smith Publications, Inc.
- Media type: Print (Magazine)
- Publication date: March 1949

"Throwback" is a classic science fiction short story featuring atavism by L. Sprague de Camp. It was first published in the magazine Astounding Science Fiction for March 1949. It first appeared in book form in the collection A Gun for Dinosaur and Other Imaginative Tales (Doubleday, 1963); it later appeared in the anthology Apeman, Spaceman (Doubleday, 1968). The story has been translated into Italian and German.

== Plot summary ==
Football scout Oliver Grogan is looking for recruits for the Chicago Wolves, but his efforts are unsuccessful. Accepting an invitation from Professor Frybus to visit a reservation for Gigantanths, he sees possibilities. The Gigantanths are the result of a multi-generational back-breeding experiment to recover prehistoric genetic traits. The result has been a race of giants of limited intelligence, who have had to be segregated for their own protection.

Encountering an exceptionally bright giant named George Ethelbert, Grogan pitches him to consider a football career. The massive, nine-foot tall George would prefer to be an artist, so Grogan dangles the lure of paying for his art lessons. The giant agrees, and is spirited off to Chicago for training. George takes naturally to the game, and in his first game is easily taking out the rival Dallas Wildcats until they call foul and refuse to play. In response, the football league bans Gigantanths from the game.

Grogan, broke and ruined, tries to renege on his agreement with George, only to find the giant cannier than he seems, and with a lawyer to back him. Stymied, Grogan attempts to skip town with team funds, forcing his former protégé to enforce their deal in a more physical fashion.

== Scientific basis ==
De Camp based his Gigantanths on the fossil species Gigantopithecus, then called Gigantanthropus and theorized to be a human ancestor. This interpretation is now outdated. As de Camp himself noted in 1973, "[a]ccording to an article in the Scientific American for January 1970, the huge fossil primate ... is not now considered, as it was at first, a carnivore, [but] is now thought to have been a gramnivore (i.e., living mainly on the seeds of cereal grasses) [and] is no longer deemed partly ancestral to man (as the late Dr Weidenreich thought) but much closer to the gorilla, probably resembling a gorilla 9 feet tall when standing erect, and weighing circa 600 pounds. And Pop! goes the assumption of my story 'Throwback'!"

== Reception ==
P. Schuyler Miller, commenting on the story, notes that it "plays with the possibilities of back-breeding people to recreate our pre-Sapiens forebears—in this case a well-meaning Gigantanthropus who gets a short-lived job in pro-football."

Avram Davidson found the story among most others in A Gun for Dinosaur and Other Imaginative Tales "a great disappointment," feeling the author "[t]ime after time ... gets hold of a great idea—and throws it away in playing for laughs of the feeblest conceivable sort."

== Relation to other works ==
De Camp's use of cave men is a common one in his fiction, beginning with the first story he ever wrote, "The Hairless Ones Come" (1939). Other examples include the short story "Living Fossil" (1939) and novel Genus Homo (1950), placing remnant Homo Sapiens in futures dominated by evolved monkeys and apes, "The Gnarly Man" (1939), about an immortal Neanderthal Man, some of the Viagens Interplanetarias and Novarian tales, which feature both advanced and primitive humanoids co-existing in their respective venues, and the late novel The Pixilated Peeress (1991), in which Neanderthal survivors live on as "trolls" in an alternate Europe. The plot device of bringing in a fantastic ringer to win a sporting competition is also used in the early short story "Nothing in the Rules" (1939).
