= Heroes and Hobgoblins =

1981 collection of poetry by L. Sprague de Camp

- Dust-jacket illustration by Tim Kirk for Heroes and Hobgoblins
- Author: L. Sprague de Camp
- Illustrator: Tim Kirk
- Cover artist: Tim Kirk
- Language: English
- Genre: Science fiction, fantasy
- Publisher: Donald M. Grant, Publisher, Inc.
- Publication date: 1981
- Publication place: United States
- Media type: Print (Hardback)
- Pages: 158
- ISBN: 0-937986-33-X
- OCLC: 8631602
- Dewey Decimal: 811/.52 21
- LC Class: PS3507.E2344 H4 1981

Heroes and Hobgoblins is a 1981 collection of science fiction and fantasy poetry by American author L. Sprague de Camp, illustrated by Tim Kirk. First announced to be published in 1977 by Heritage Press, this edition never appeared, and the book was first published by Donald M. Grant, Publisher, Inc. in an edition of 1250 copies signed by both the author and the illustrator.

The book contains most of the poems from de Camp's earlier collections, Demons and Dinosaurs and Phantoms and Fancies, though the arrangement is different in the current collection, along with a substantial number of additional poems.

"A Caution", "Atavism", "Babylon", "Conan the Limmerian", "Fiction", "Flying Fish", "Gratuity", "Happiness", "Houses on Stalks", "Ivan Vasilevitch", "Magus Imperitus", "Merlin", "My Carrack", "My Uglies", "Progress", "Psyche", "Ripples", "Shadows over Sqaumous", "Souls", "Spells", "Spring", "Tars Tarkas and I", "The Ameba", "The Barbarian", "The Bats of Florence", "The Dome of the Rock", "The Dragon-Slayers", "The Enchanted Isles", "The Fossils", "The Galápagos Marine Iguana", "The Ghost of H.P.L.", "The Little Green Men", "The Megaliths of Avebury", "The Octopus", "The Opossum", "Wayfarers", and "Yuggoth Comes to Providence" are unique to this collection.

"The Ogre" is shared with Demons and Dinosaurs only.

"A Glass of Goblanti", "A Night Club in Cairo", "Art", "Bear on a Bicycle", "Bourzi", "Carnac", "Disillusion", "Ghost Ships", "Jewels", "Leaves", "Mother and Son", "Preferences", "Tehuantepec", "Teotihuacán", "The Elephant", "The Hippopotamus", "The Home of the Gods", "The Indian Rhinoceros", "The Iron Pillar of Delhi", "The Lizards of Tula", "The Mantis", "The Newt", "The Old-Fashioned Lover", "The Olmec", "The Other Baghdad", "The Reaper", "The Saviors", "The Trap", "Thoth-Amon's Complaint", "Tiger in the Rain", and "Xeroxing the Necomonicon" are shared with Phantoms and Fancies only.

The remaining poems are common to all three collections.

== Contents ==
- "Foreword"
- "Places Near & Far"
  - "Tehuantepec"
  - "The Olmec"
  - "Tintagel"
  - "Bourzi"
  - "A Night Club in Cairo"
  - "Meroê"
  - "The Jungle Vine"
  - "The Dome of the Rock"
  - "Nahr al-Kalb"
  - "New Year's Eve in Baghdad"
  - "Jewels"
  - "The Home of the Gods"
  - "Patnâ"
  - "The Iron Pillar of Delhi"
  - "Disillusion"
  - "Wayfarers"
- Speaking Stones & Bricks
  - "Ruins"
  - "Tikal"
  - "Teotihuacán"
  - "The Little Lion of Font-de-Gaume"
  - "Carnac"
  - "The Megaliths of Avebury"
  - "The Great Pyramid"
  - "Babylon"
  - "Sirrush"
  - "Ziggurat"
- "Beasts, Birds, & Creeping Thangs"
  - "Faunas"
  - "The Elephant"
  - "The Indian Rhinoceros"
  - "The Hippopotamus"
  - "Tiger in the Rain"
  - "The Bats of Florence"
  - "Atavism"
  - "The Opossum"
  - "The Enchanted Isles"
  - "A Brook in Vermont"
  - "The Dragon-Kings"
  - "The Lizards of Tula"
  - "The Galápagos Marine Iguana"
  - "The Newt"
  - "Flying Fish"
  - "The Mantis"
  - "The Octopus"
  - "The Ameba"
  - "The Tusk"
  - "The Fossils"
- "Myths & Mythmakers"
  - "Fiction"
  - "A Skald's Lament"
  - "Creation"
  - "The Gods"
  - "Old Heroes"
  - "Où Sont les Planètes d'Antan?"
  - "A Tale of Two John Carters"
  - "Houses on Stalks"
  - "Tars Tarkas and I"
  - "The Ghost of H.P.L."
  - "Yuggoth Comes to Providence"
  - "Magus Imperitus"
  - "Shadows Over Squamous"
  - "Xeroxing the Necromonicon"
  - "Souls"
  - "Conan the Limmerian"
  - "Transposition"
  - "Mother and Son"
  - "Thoth-Amon's Complaint"
  - "The Barbarian"
  - "The Little Green Men"
- "The Human Condition"
  - "Psyche"
  - "Envy"
  - "Warriors"
  - "The Old-Fashioned Lover"
  - "Spring"
  - "Spells"
  - "Happiness"
  - "My Uglies"
  - "My Carrack"
  - "Ripples"
  - "A Caution"
  - "Preferences"
  - "Bear on a Bicycle"
  - "The Saviors"
  - "The Trap"
  - "The Reaper"
  - "Art"
- "Some Other Thoughts"
  - "Ghosts"
  - "Nabonidus"
  - "Ghost Ships"
  - "The Dragon-Slayers"
  - "Gratuity"
  - "Reward of Virtue"
  - "Heldendämmerung"
  - "Merlin"
  - "Progress in Baghdad"
  - "The Sorcerers"
  - "The Other Baghdad"
  - "Ivan Vasilevitch"
  - "Leaves"
  - "The Ogre"
  - "A Glass of Goblanti"
  - "Progress"
