= Black Sphinx of Nebthu =

Short story by Lyon Sprague de Camp

- Short story by L. Sprague de Camp and Lin Carter
- Country: United States
- Language: English
- Genre: Fantasy

Publication
- Published in: Conan of Aquilonia
- Publication type: Collection
- Publisher: Ace Books
- Media type: Print (Paperback)
- Publication date: 1977
- Series: Conan the Barbarian

"Black Sphinx of Nebthu" is a fantasy short story by American writers L. Sprague de Camp and Lin Carter, featuring the fictional sword and sorcery hero Conan the Barbarian created by Robert E. Howard. It was first published in the July 1973 issue of the magazine Fantastic, and first appeared in book form in the Ace Books paperback collection Conan of Aquilonia in May 1977, which was reprinted several times through 1994. The first British edition was published by Sphere Books in October 1978.

== Plot summary ==
Following the events of "The Witch of the Mists", King Conan of Aquilonia leads a military expedition across Zingara, Argos, and Shem before entering Stygia to confront his arch-enemy, Thoth-Amon. Accompanying him are his son, Prince Conn, Conan's generals Trocero and Pallantides, and Diviatix, a white druid from the Pictish Wilderness, who promises divine support for Conan.

The goal of his expedition is the ancient city of Nebthu, site of a massive sphinx depicting the hyena god of chaos and rumored haunt of Thoth-Amon's Order of the Black Ring. After discovering an entryway inside the sphinx, Conan descends into the depths, reaching a vast chamber where he confronts the massed assembly of wizards.

Thoth-Amon and his fellow sorcerers initially prove themselves to be too powerful for Conan. But Conan had taken the precaution of bringing along a magical jewel known as the Heart of Ahriman (which helped Conan regain his throne in The Hour of the Dragon) With the jewel in his hand, Conan's Pictish ally is more than a match for the Stygians.

Many of the wizards are killed or driven mad by the Heart's powers, but Thoth-Amon manages to unleash the monstrous hyena of chaos against Conan's accomplice. Unfortunately for him, the hell-hound is incapable of fine discrimination. The first army it encounters, and therefore destroys, is that of Stygia. His sanctum in ruins and now persona non grata in his own country, Thoth-Amon is forced to flee, seeking refuge with his last remaining ally - the King of Zembabwei.

Rather than rest content and return to Aquilonia, Conan is determined to settle accounts once and for all and take his army in pursuit to the heart of what would now be called Africa.

| Preceded by "The Witch of the Mists" | Complete Conan Saga (William Galen Gray chronology) | Succeeded by "Red Moon of Zembabwei" |
