= The Egg (de Camp short story) =

1956 short story by Lyon Sprague de Camp

- Short story by L. Sprague de Camp
- Country: United States
- Language: English
- Genre: Science fiction

Publication
- Published in: Satellite Science Fiction
- Publisher: Renown Publications, INc.
- Media type: Print (Magazine)
- Publication date: October 1956

"The Egg" is a science fiction short story by L. Sprague de Camp. It was first published in the magazine Satellite Science Fiction for October, 1956. It first appeared in book form in the collection A Gun for Dinosaur and Other Imaginative Tales (Doubleday, 1963). The story has been translated into German.

== Plot summary ==
The reptilian alien Gnoth, Yerethian consul to Earth, is preparing to go out to a drive-in movie with his wife Triw. The outing is business as well as pleasure, as it's part of Gnoth's job to monitor Terran popular entertainment to determine Yerethians are being represented fairly. Since their egg is due to hatch in four days and they are concerned about its safety, they have hired Patrice Ober, a local teen, to babysit it. After giving Patrice her instructions they leave, and Pat settles down to read Jane Eyre as part of her high school homework. When that palls she thinks about boys, notably the two currently vying for her affection, the aggressive football hero Terry Blaine and the more gentlemanly intellectual Andy Dupas.

Meanwhile, Terry has called Pat's house and been told by her mother where she is. Her father is put out over this, suspecting Terry's intentions. Terry zips off to the Yerethians' home on his buzzer, or flying platform, to surprise Pat. He has brought some records, and entices her into dancing, during which they accidentally bump the incubator, injuring Pat and eliciting odd sounds from the egg within. Pat begs off from further dancing, whereupon Terry begins a forceful campaign of seduction. Andy, in the meantime, has also called the Obers asking about Pat. Pat's father, feeling him a responsible counterbalance to the reckless Terry, lets him know where she is as well.

At the Yerethians', the distracted teens fail to notice that the egg is hatching, and the baby alien, resembling a long-legged, long-necked alligator, emerging from the incubator. Yerethian young are mindless, instinct-driven carnivores during their first three years of life, after which they become teachable. Seeing the humans as prey, it immediately makes for them. They flee to the front door, but the Yerethian is speedier than they are, albeit less adept at sharp turns, and catches up before they can open it. They make for the powder room; Terry, reaching it first, locks himself in, leaving Pat to her fate. She can barely keep ahead of the alien in the pursuit that follows, and is trapped by the time Andy arrives at the house. The quick-thinking Andy attracts the baby's attention and ducks under a couch; it gets stuck trying to follow, and as it struggles he whips off his belt and chokes the creature with it.

At this point the parents arrive home; Triw gathers up her baby, clouting it into quiescence when it tries to bite her, while Gnoth sternly demands explanations. At first they blame the teens for causing their egg to hatch prematurely by jostling it, but it soon becomes apparent that Triw had miscalculated the incubation time due to confusion in reconciling the Yerethian and Terran calendars; the egg in fact hatched right on time. Gnoth proposes they all keep the matter quiet to prevent embarrassment to everyone concerned. The teenagers agree.

Terry flies off in disgrace, while Andy drives Pat back home, taking the rogue's place in her regard. Alas for romance; Andy is heading off to college soon, and expects to be away for years earning his Ph.D. She asks if he wants her to wait for him, but Andy, practically, notes that's too much to expect of someone so young. He allows that if she's still around when he's done with college they can talk about it. Broken-hearted, Pat goes to bed and cries on her pillow.

== Reception ==
P. Schuyler Miller's comment on the tale takes a rather unrealistic lesson from it: "Need a baby-sitter for your egg? Then make sure—as the Yerethian couple of 'The Egg' did not--that you have correlated your calendar properly with the terrestrial one."

Avram Davidson found the story among most others in A Gun for Dinosaur and Other Imaginative Tales "a great disappointment," feeling the author "[t]ime after time ... gets hold of a great idea—and throws it away in playing for laughs of the feeblest conceivable sort."

== Relation to other works ==
De Camp also dealt with the theme of teens disrupting interplanetary relations in "Let's Have Fun" (1957), in which juvenile delinquents endanger the young of aliens rather than vice versa. In his "Judgment Day" (1955), the maliciousness of delinquents is the catalyst for a physicist's decision to publish a discovery that will result in nuclear holocaust.
