= The Witch of the Mists =

Short story by Lyon Sprague de Camp

- Short story by L. Sprague de Camp and Lin Carter
- Country: United States
- Language: English
- Genre: Fantasy

Publication
- Published in: Conan of Aquilonia
- Publication type: Collection
- Publisher: Ace Books
- Media type: Print (Paperback)
- Publication date: 1977
- Series: Conan the Barbarian

"The Witch of the Mists" is a fantasy short story by American writers L. Sprague de Camp and Lin Carter, featuring the fictional sword and sorcery hero Conan the Barbarian created by Robert E. Howard. It was first published in the August 1972 issue of the magazine Fantastic, and in book form by Ace Books in the paperback collection Conan of Aquilonia in May 1977. The first British edition was published by Sphere Books in October 1978.

== Plot ==
A decade and a half after the events of Conan the Conqueror, King Conan of Aquilonia is hunting with Prince Conn, his teenaged son and heir. The boy is captured by a band of Hyperborean warlocks, servants of the witch queen Louhi, as bait to lure Conan into a trap.

Conan travels north to Hyperborea for the first time since escaping captivity there during his own youth in "The Thing in the Crypt". To reach the citadel of Pohiola, where his son is being held, Conan fights his way through desolate country, battling flesh-eating swamp people and braving near-starvation. He crosses the Hyperborean border, marked with a gigantic rune-inscribed skull, and ultimately enters the citadel.

Confronting Louhi, he is able to free his son, discovering in the process that his arch-enemy, the Stygian sorcerer Thoth-Amon, is behind the plot.

Preceded by Conan the Great	Complete Conan Saga (William Galen Gray chronology)	Succeeded by "Black Sphinx of Nebthu"
