= Kleon =

Kleon is a surname. Notable people with the surname include:

- Austin Kleon (born 1983), American author
- Barbara Kleon (born 1980), Italian alpine skier

== See also ==
- Kleon Penn (born 1986), British Virgin Islander-Puerto Rican basketball player
- Cleon (died 422 BC), Athenian politician and general (strategos) during the Peloponnesian War
