= The Best of L. Sprague de Camp =

1978 collection of writings by L. Sprague de Camp

- Cover of the first edition.
- Author: L. Sprague de Camp
- Cover artist: Richard V. Corben
- Language: English
- Series: Ballantine's Classic Library of Science Fiction
- Genre: Science fiction, fantasy
- Publisher: Doubleday
- Publication date: 1978
- Publication place: United States
- Media type: Print (hardback)
- Pages: xv, 301
- Preceded by: The Best of Murray Leinster
- Followed by: The Best of Jack Williamson

The Best of L. Sprague de Camp is a collection of writings by American science fiction and fantasy author L. Sprague de Camp, first published in hardback by Nelson Doubleday in February 1978 and in paperback by Ballantine Books in May of the same year as a volume in its Classic Library of Science Fiction. The book was reprinted by Ballantine in May 1986. It was reissued in trade paperback and ebook editions by Phoenix Pick in December 2014. It has also been translated (with some changes in content) into German.

== Summary ==
The book contains eighteen short works of fiction and poetry by the author, together with an introduction by fellow science fiction writer Poul Anderson and an afterword by the author.

== Contents ==
- "L. Sprague de Camp — Engineer and Sorcerer" by Poul Anderson.
- "Hyperpilosity". An apparent plague makes people grow bodily hair similar to that of Gorillas. Virologists Oliveira and Weiss attempt to find a cure amid large-scale societal changes happening around them.
- "Language for Time Travelers" (essay). De Camp explores an issue hitherto ignored by writers of time-travel fiction; the barriers to communication in the eras visited by time-travelers posed by natural language change. Examples of the difficulties involved are humorously explored through the fictional tribulations of one such traveler confronted with various linguistic scenarios.
- "The Command". Uplifted bear Johnny Black discovers the scientists who have granted him human intelligence have been reduced by a mysterious disease to automatons, unable to function except in response to direct orders. Johnny is equal to taking out the would-be world conqueror responsible, but curing the victims proves problematic—he has the counter-agent, but his bear paws can't inject it, and with his bear vocal chords can't order them to do so themselves. If he can't figure out a solution, the plague will spread world-wide, and humanity is doomed.
- "The Merman". Vernon Brock is a biologist who experiments with turning lungs into gills. After accidentally performing the transformation on himself, he is stuck underwater, unable to communicate, and attempts to resolve the situation using his limited knowledge.
- "Employment". Paleontologist and inventor Gilmore Platt has devised a method of restoring fossil animals to life, causing difficulties for his assistant-turned zookeeper Kenneth Staples—particularly after Mr. Nively, representing the country's animal importers, shoots their mammoth to shut down the competition from these prehistoric resurrectionists. It only makes the mammoth mad... If Staples can't handle the situation he may be out of a job.
- "The Gnarly Man". Shining Hawk, a Neanderthal man rendered ageless by a lightning strike, has survived into modern times by keeping a low profile. Currently posting as one Clarence Gaffney, he is found out by scientist Matilda Sandler, at whose urging he warily agrees to submit to medical examination in return for surgery to correct some old injuries. But when Sandler develops a romantic interest in him and the prospective surgeon is discovered plotting to dissect him to achieve medical fame, Gaffney bolts.
- "Reward of Virtue" (poem).
- "Nothing in the Rules". Accusations of foul play ensue when a mermaid is entered at a swim meet, but the stratagem appears perfectly legal. No such ploy ever having been envisioned, it turns out that nothing in the rules states a contestant can't have a tail, or even has to be human...
- "The Hardwood Pile". When Dan Pringle's Gahato sawmill processes a tree harboring a dryad, the spirit, having no other home, remains with the resulting pile of lumber, "haunting" it to prevent its dispersal. A running conflict between the two ensues, ending only when Pringle agrees to sell the whole pile to renovate the dance floor of a local bar, at which his antagonist then becomes an employee.
- "The Reluctant Shaman". Indian curio-shop proprietor Virgil Hathaway gets stuck babysitting a batch of mischievous Iroquois spirits, who get out of control and run rampant "helping" people with poltergeist-style tricks. Only a medicine man can bring them to heel, but is Hathaway up to the task?
- "The Inspector's Teeth". Hithafea, a dinosaur-like native from the planet Osiris enrolls in an Earth college and pledges one of its fraternities. Snobbish big man on campus John Fitzgerald, resenting Hithafea, hazes him mercilessly. But how does this connect with the fate of an interstellar treaty negotiated many years later?
- "The Guided Man". The Telagog Company can take over your body for you in awkward social situations, enabling you to negotiate them effortlessly. The service is a godsend for bashful Ovid Ross, until his controller decides he wants the same girl Ovid does...
- "The Ameba" (poem).
- "Judgment Day". Physicist Wade Ormont discovers an unsuspected type of nuclear reaction that could make his reputation—and, in the wrong hands, lead inevitably to universal destruction. Should he publish his findings and bask in the ephemeral glory, or does the survival of a world that has rejected and despised him count more?
- "A Gun for Dinosaur". Time-traveling hunter Reginald Rivers recounts an anecdote from one of his time safari expeditions involving problematic clients. Courtney James is an arrogant and spoiled playboy; August Holtzinger is a small, timid man, too puny the handle the heavy weaponry needed to take down Cretaceous period dinosaurs. Reluctantly, Rivers allows him on the safari with a lighter caliber weapon. James' reckless shooting rouses a slumbering Tyrannosaurus. Holtzinger tries to save him, but the creature shrugs off his gunfire and snaps him up. Rivers aborts the trip, angering James, who later tries to go back to the Cretaceous again and assassinate Rivers' past self. But the space-time continuum has a rough way with time paradoxes...
- "The Emperor's Fan". Emperor Tsotuga of Kuromon feels insecure on his throne, and seeks security in magic. An enchanted fan enabling him to wave away all his troubles seems just the thing. Unfortunately, he loses the code-book that enables him to restore those accidentally fanned, including most of his advisers—and the device proves little obstacle to a clever and unscrupulous conspirator...
- "Two Yards of Dragon". Squire Eudoric Damberson wishes to wed his magical tutor's daughter and become a knight. The price is procuring for the magician a portion of dragon hide for use in his magic. Dragons being locally scarce, Eudoric sets out for the east to slay one. Doing so, however, runs him afoul with the local game laws.
- "The Little Green Men" (poem).
- "Author's Afterword".

== Contents (German Edition) ==
The German edition of the book largely reproduces the contents and order of the pieces of the original version, but with some changes. "Language for Time Travelers," "The Reluctant Shaman," "The Guided Man," "The Ameba," "Judgment Day," "A Gun for Dinosaur," "The Little Green Man," and the author's afterword are omitted, while translations of other de Camp pieces, "Git Along!," "The Rug and the Bull," and "A Sending of Serpents" are added, while "Reward of Virtue" is moved to a position further down in the contents.

- "Vorwort" (translation of "L. Sprague de Camp—Engineer and Sorcerer") (Poul Anderson)
- "Hyperpilosität" ("Hyperpilosity")
- "Der Befehl" ("The Command")
- "Der Meermann" ("The Merman")
- "Die neue Stellung" ("Employment")
- "Der Urmensch" ("The Gnarly Man")
- "Davon steht nichts in den Regeln" ("Nothing in the Rules")
- "Der Bretterstapel" ("The Hardwood Pile")
- "Die Zähne des Inspektors" ("The Inspector's Teeth")
- "Glückliche Reise" ("Git Along!")
- "Lohn ritterlicher Tugend" ("Reward of Virtue")
- "Des Kaisers Fächer" ("The Emperor's Fan")
- "Der Teppich und der Stier" ("The Rug and the Bull")
- "Drei Ellen Drachenhaut" ("Two Yards of Dragon")
- "Nichts als Schlangen" ("A Sending of Serpents")

-

== Awards ==
The collection placed seventh in the 1979 Locus Poll Award for Best Single Author Collection.

== Reception ==
The book was reviewed by Algis Budrys in The Washington Post for March 5, 1978 and The Magazine of Fantasy & Science Fiction for September 1978, as well as by Dan Miller in Booklist for June 1, 1978 and Robert Coulson in Amazing Stories for May 1987.

Budrys called the book "[a] triumphant collection from SF's best-educated humanist," and a "selection of De Camp's witty, very literate fantasy and science fiction. He considered it "long overdue," citing "Language for Time Travelers" as "seminal" in "creat[ing] a permanent change in the way many time travel stories are written, or should be written" and "The Gnarly Man," "Nothing in the Rules" and "A Gun for Dinosaur" as "classics from which many subsequent stories by other writers have derived. ... Time after time, de Camp has created basic ideas which were obviously larger than his original setting, and whose development within the minds of other writers has given them a species of extended life, to the enrichment of the genre." He also singles out for positive comment "The Emperor's Fan," "The Hardwood Pile" and "Judgment Day." De Camp's fiction, Budrys notes, provides "entertainment on a high level of intelligence," and the author himself "is another one of those people who does good work and endures."

Miller rated the collection "[s]olid entertainment from a master," demonstrating how "de Camp's piquant ironies and tragicomic view of mankind set him apart as a story-teller of singular erudition and sensitivity." Elsewhere, Booklist noted that "De Camp's clever fusion of the droll and the sober is evident throughout."

Coulson comments extensively on each of the pieces in the collection, observing that "not all of these are humorous, but a high percentage are." "Judgment Day" and "A Gun for Dinosaur" are cited as "more serious stories." He notes that "[t]he plots of most of the stories would qualify as farce, but the treatment, less raunchy than most modern farces, would make them something between farce and whimsy."
