= The Merman =

- Short story by L. Sprague de Camp
- cover of Astounding Science-Fiction, December 1938, illustrating The Merman
- Country: United States
- Language: English
- Genre: Science fiction

Publication
- Published in: Astounding Science-Fiction
- Publisher: Street & Smith Publications, Inc.
- Media type: Print (Magazine)
- Publication date: December, 1938

"The Merman" is a science fiction story by American writer L. Sprague de Camp, based on the concept of human biological engineering . It was first published in the magazine Astounding Science-Fiction for December, 1938. It first appeared in book form in the collection The Wheels of If and Other Science Fiction (Shasta, 1949); it later appeared in the anthology Science Fiction of the Thirties (Bobbs-Merrill, 1975) and the collection The Best of L. Sprague de Camp (Doubleday, 1978). The story has been translated into German

== Plot summary ==
Vernon Brock, an assistant aquarist at the New York City Aquarium, has, in addition to his normal duties, been studying the properties of gills and lungs, and devised a theoretical method of inducing the latter to assume the properties of the former. He believes the vapor given off by a mixture of "halogen-bearing organic compounds" would do the trick, and intends to experiment on its effect with alligators. Unfortunately, the flask containing the solution breaks, giving Brock himself a whiff of the vapor.

Overcome, Brock falls into a shark tank. He quickly discovers that he can now "breathe" in water but not in air. There are difficulties: the higher density of water makes the breathing process slow and laborious, normal speech is rendered impossible, the liquid environment is too cold for his body, and he tires easily, since his lungs cannot extract as much oxygen from the water as his metabolism is used to.

Soon Brock's colleagues gather above the tank. Knowing of his experiments, they realize what has happened and do their best to help him. He interacts with them initially by sign language and then by using a remora to scrawl a message on the glass of the tank. He requests two weighted stepladders and a weighted plank. Placing the plank across the ladders, he lies down atop it so that he is just beneath the surface of the water and by extending his hands into the air can communicate further by writing on a pad of paper. He is brought food and finds that with some care he can eat—though not meat, as the sharks quickly steal it. Instead he subsists on bananas. Meanwhile, a crowd of the public has gathered in front of the tank, including a little man who observes Brock with a "peculiar intentness" he finds disturbing.

For Brock's comfort, the temperature is raised in the tank, more air lines are run in to increase the available oxygen, and the sharks are moved to a reserve tank. Nonetheless, he spends an uncomfortable night, unable to sleep "because of the constant muscular effort required to work his lungs." His thoughts grow confused, and he becomes delusional. He also starts feeling that his lungs are not working right. In the morning, the little man returns, feeding his confusion and growing paranoia. Believing himself a fish and that the man wants to eat him, he attacks the glass with his pocket knife until it gives way and he and all the water spill out onto the concourse.

Brock wakes up in the hospital, having been mercifully unconscious during the period in which his lungs finished returning to normal. While recovering well, he learns that the aquarium is facing a lawsuit from the little man, Oscar Daly, who nearly drowned when he let the water out of the tank. After his release, however, Brock comes to an arrangement with Daly that persuades the latter to drop his suit. Instead, Daly, a former circus acrobat, will use Brock's discovery to exhibit himself for money as Oscar the Merman.

== Reception ==
In Astounding Science-Fiction magazine's reader's poll "The Analytical Laboratory", the story tied for first place as the most popular piece in the issue in which it was originally published, "beating out competition as formidable as Lester del Rey's Helen O'Loy." Sam Moskowitz cited its publication as culminating a "brief period of but 15 months" in which de Camp "moved out into the front rank of science fiction writers."

== Influence ==
John J. Pierce saw the story as a forerunner to the introduction of the concept of genetic engineering in science fiction, later an important theme in the genre, but "almost unheard of" when "The Merman" was published.

Lois H. Gresh and Robert Weinberg have suggested de Camp's story as a possible influence on Bill Everett and Mort Weisinger in the creation of their golden age water-breathing comic book superheroes the Sub-Mariner and Aquaman.

== Relation to other works ==
While "The Merman" does not concern merpeople of the traditional mythical type, de Camp went on to write other tales that did, which tended to concentrate on the possibility of romantic entanglements between them and human beings. Chief among these is "Nothing in the Rules" (Unknown, July 1939), in which a lawyer helps a coach enter a mermaid in a swimming competition, only to fall in love with their protégé. A later story, "The Water Wife", an inset tale in the novel The Unbeheaded King (Del Rey Books, 1983) explores and extends the same theme in a fantasy setting.
