= Darwin and His Great Discovery =

1972 science book by L. Sprague de Camp and Catherine Crook de Camp

- cover of Darwin and His Great Discovery
- Author: L. Sprague de Camp and Catherine Crook de Camp
- Cover artist: Nonny Hogrogian
- Language: English
- Subject: Biography, Evolution
- Publisher: Macmillan Publishers
- Publication date: 1972
- Publication place: United States
- Media type: Print (Hardback)
- Pages: 248 pp

Darwin and His Great Discovery is a science book for young adults by L. Sprague de Camp and Catherine Crook de Camp, first published by Macmillan in 1972.

== Content ==
The work is an examination of naturalist Charles Darwin and the theory of evolution he proposed and marshaled evidence for in The Origin of Species. A brief account of his visit to the Galápagos Islands brings up the issue of human origins, leading into a discussion of early theories on the formation and age of the Earth and evolution. A biographical sketch of Darwin follows, covering his youth, his naturalistic studies on the voyage of the Beagle and subsequent life, focusing on his scientific researches and writings. The history of the theory of human evolution as currently understood is then presented, with sections on the work of Mendel, the development of the science of genetics, and the Scopes Trial. It includes a selected bibliography and index.

== Reception ==
Isadora Kunitz, writing in the Library Journal, found the work a "well-written account of Charles Darwin's life and work," with "[d]etails about his personal life add[ing] to the interest of the book." She judged it "an excellent supplementary title for collections."

The Booklist called it "[w]ell written, readable, and informative" and suitable for readers of junior high and high school age.

== Relation to other works ==
The Scopes Trial was the subject of a comprehensive study previously written by L. Sprague de Camp, published as The Great Monkey Trial in 1968.
