= Phantoms and Fancies =

1972 collection of poetry by L. Sprague de Camp

- Dust-jacket illustration by Tim Kirk for Phantoms and Fancies
- Author: L. Sprague de Camp
- Illustrator: Tim Kirk
- Cover artist: Tim Kirk
- Language: English
- Genre: poetry
- Publisher: Mirage Press
- Publication date: 1972
- Publication place: United States
- Media type: Print (Hardback)
- Pages: 107 pp

Phantoms and Fancies is a 1972 collection of poetry by science fiction and fantasy author L. Sprague de Camp, illustrated by Tim Kirk. It was published by Mirage Press.

The book contains most of the poems from de Camp's earlier collection, Demons and Dinosaurs, though the arrangement is different in the current collection, along with a substantial number of additional poems. Most of the poems in the collection were also incorporated into de Camp's later poetry collection, Heroes and Hobgoblins, though again with a different arrangement.

The poems "African Night," "Beholder," "Delra Beach, Florida," "Farewell to Adam," "Glamour," the nine "Jorian's Jingles," "The Ghost," "The Irish," and "To My Library" are unique to this collection.

"Acrophobia," "Heroes," "Night," "Time," and "To R.E.H." are shared with Demons and Dinosaurs only.

"A Glass of Goblanti," "A Night Club in Cairo," "Art," "Bear on a Bicycle," "Bourzi," "Carnac," "Disillusion," "Ghost Ships," "Jewels," "Leaves," "Mother and Son," "Preferences," "Tehuantepec," "Teotihuacán," "The Elephant," "The Hippopotamus," "The Home of the Gods," "The Indian Rhinoceros," "The Iron Pillar of Delhi," "The Lizards of Tula," "The Mantis," "The Newt," "The Old-Fashioned Lover," "The Olmec," "The Other Baghdad," "The Reaper," "The Saviors," "The Trap," "Thoth-Amon's Complaint," "Tiger in the Rain," and "Xeroxing the Necomonicon" are shared with Heroes and Hobgoblins only.

The remaining poems are common to all three collections.

The "Jorian" to whom the nine poems designated "Jorian's Jingles" are attributed is a character and occasional poet in de Camp's fantasy novels The Goblin Tower (1968) and The Clocks of Iraz (1971), in which most of them were originally published.

== Contents ==
- "Beholder"
- "Tikal"
- "Tintagel"
- "Meroê"
- "Nahr al-Kalb"
- "Patnâ"
- "New Year's Eve in Baghdad"
- "Ruins"
- "The Jungle Vine"
- "Sirush"
- "Carnac"
- "The Little Lion of Font-de-Gaume"
- "Teotihuacán"
- "Disillusion"
- "Delray Beach, Florida"
- "The Home of the Gods"
- "Bourzi"
- "Tehuantepec"
- "Jewels"
- "African Night"
- "The Irish"
- "The Iron Pillar of Delhi"
- "The Olmec"
- "The Tusk"
- "The Dragon-Kings"
- "A Brook in Vermont"
- "The Indian Rhinoceros"
- "Tiger in the Rain"
- "The Hippopotamus"
- "The Lizards of Tula"
- "The Mantis"
- "The Elephant"
- "The Newt"
- "A Skald's Lament"
- "Heldendämmerung"
- "Transposition"
- "Old Heroes"
- "To R.E.H."
- "Heroes"
- "Où Sont les Planètes d'Antan?"
- "The Ghost"
- Jorian's Jingles:

- "On Battle"

- "On a Shrew"
- "On Executioners"
- "On Polygamy"
- "On Piracy"
- "On His Homeland"
- "On Himself"
- "On Magic"
- "On Death"

- "Envy"
- "A Tale of Two John Carters"
- "Mother and Son"
- "Thoth-Amon's Complaint"
- "A Glass of Goblanti"
- "Xeroxing the Necromonicon"
- "Time"
- "To My Library"
- "Night"
- "Warriors"
- "Acrophobia"
- "Faunas"
- "The Sorcerers"
- "Preferences"
- "Bear on a Bicycle"
- "The Old-Fashioned Lover"
- "The Trap"
- "The Reaper"
- "A Night Club in Cairo"
- "Art"
- "Nabonidus"
- "The Gods"
- "Ghost Ships"
- "Farewell to Adam"
- "Glamour"
- "Ghosts"
- "Creation"
- "Ziggurat"
- "The Great Pyramid"
- "Progress in Baghdad"
- "Reward of Virtue"
- "The Saviors"
- "Leaves"
- "The Other Baghdad"
