= Shadows in the Skull =

Short story by Lyon Sprague de Camp

- Short story by L. Sprague de Camp and Lin Carter
- Country: United States
- Language: English
- Genre: Fantasy

Publication
- Published in: Conan of Aquilonia
- Publication type: Collection
- Publisher: Ace Books
- Media type: Print (Paperback)
- Publication date: 1977
- Series: Conan the Barbarian

"Shadows in the Skull" is a short story by American writers L. Sprague de Camp and Lin Carter, featuring the fictional sword and sorcery hero Conan the Barbarian created by Robert E. Howard. It was first published in the February 1975 issue of the magazine Fantastic, and first appeared in book form in the Ace Books paperback collection Conan of Aquilonia in May 1977, which was reprinted several times through 1994. The first British edition was published by Sphere Books in October 1978.

== Plot ==
Aided by Zembabwean Wyvern-riders and black Amazons, King Conan of Aquilonia and his son, Prince Conn, track their arch-foe, Stygian sorcerer Thoth-Amon, to the extreme southern end of the Hyborian continent.

The sorcerer has taken refuge with the last remnants of the evil Serpent Men, shape-changers who have menaced mankind throughout its prehistory. Conan's allies locate their skull-shaped hideout, only to fall victim to the Serpent Men's ploy of emulating beautiful Stygian women.

His final battle with Thoth-Amon in the sorcerer's own domain proves as hard-fought as their previous encounters, but is ultimately successful at ridding the world of the fiend. Conan's 13-years old son, Conn, deals the death blow to his father's old arch-enemy.

Preceded by "Red Moon of Zembabwei"	Complete Conan Saga (William Galen Gray chronology)	Succeeded by Conan of the Isles
