= The Guided Man =

- Short story by L. Sprague de Camp
- Alex Schomburg's illustration of the story in Startling Stories magazine
- Country: United States
- Language: English
- Genre: Science fiction

Publication
- Published in: Startling Stories
- Publisher: Street & Smith Publications, Inc.
- Media type: Print (Magazine)
- Publication date: October, 1952

"The Guided Man" is a classic science fiction short story by L. Sprague de Camp. It was first published in the magazine Startling Stories for October, 1952. It first appeared in book form in the collection A Gun for Dinosaur and Other Imaginative Tales (Doubleday, 1963). It has also appeared in Science Fiction Yearbook no. 3 (Popular Library, 1969) and the collection The Best of L. Sprague de Camp (Doubleday, Feb. 1978). The story has been translated into German.

== Synopsis ==
For mild-mannered Ovid Ross of Rattlesnake, Montana, struggling to gain his footing among the city slickers of New York City, the Telegog Company seems to offer a solution to his social problems. Its proprietary technology allows the inept to have their bodies taken over remotely by experts who easily steer them through awkward situations. After hearing salesman Mr. Nye's sales pitch and meeting in-house professionals Gilbert Falck and Jerome Bundy, Ross signs up and receives the necessary implant.

Ross first signals his "guide" on facing a terrifying job interview with Timothy Hoolihan, tyrannical director of The Garment Gazette trade journal; Falck takes over and under his control Ross effortlessly finesses Hoolihan and gets the job. Enthusiastic over his success, Ross treats Falke to drinks after work, and later calls up his girlfriend Claire La Motte with the good news. To celebrate, Claire invites him over for a Sunday picnic at the estate of the Peshkovs, a wealthy Russian family she works for, including Falck and the latter's girl in the invitation.

After Ross learns the ropes at his new job he is sent out to interview one of the journal's major advertisers, Marcus Ballin of Outstanding Knitwear, for a feature article. Worried he might blow it, he calls in Falck again. He also extends Claire's invitation and arranges to have Bundy backstop him on the picnic if necessary, given that Falck will be unable to do so.

Under Falck's guidance, Ross's interview of Ballin goes well until the knitwear man starts talking about a current project; a pageant to choose the most beautiful bust in America from among women modeling Outstanding's sheer sweaters. It seems he needs a third judge. To his horror, Ross finds Falck volunteering him for the role. His guide afterwards says he has done Ross a favor, it being "an opportunity most men would fight tooth and nail for." The mortified Ross demands Falck see him through it, to which Falck smugly replies he has every intention of doing so.

Strait-laced Hoolihan is not happy to hear what Ross will be doing, but his subordinates talk him into agreeing, lest the journal lose Ballin's account. Meanwhile, Sunday rolls around, and Ross picks up Falck and the guide's date Dorothea Dunkelberg for their picnic with Claire. Having signaled Bundy, Ross is confident he will not commit any gaffes. Claire shows the party around the Peshkov estate and points out neighboring properties, among them the Heliac Health Club, a nudist camp.

After lunch, Falck asks to use the phone, and uses it to call Bundy. He tells Bundy that Ross is bombing with Claire, and suggests he "give him a more aggressive and uninhibited pattern." Bundy agrees, unaware that Falck, who has become smitten with Claire, is not out to help Ross but to sabotage him. Shortly Ross is bossing the party, even browbeating everyone into swimming naked. At this point the Peshkovs, who were expected to be absent all day, return, forcing the dishabille picnickers to run for the woods to hide. In a bit of luck, they find themselves on the grounds of the Heliac Club, where they fit right in. Less happily, one of the club members turns out to be Marcus Ballin, but neither he nor Ross are interested in their presence at Heliac coming out, and agree to keep things quiet. Ballin does suggest Claire enter his contest, though!

Provided clothing by a helpful matron, Claire retrieves the others' outfits from the Peshkov estate, and Ross uses the signaler in his pocket to have Bundy release control. He then shamefacedly apologizes to Claire for his earlier behavior, but she laughs it off, confiding she has not had so much fun in years. She also decides to enter Ballin's contest. Despite his chagrin over Bundy's guidance, Ross realizes he has to stick with Telegog for a while. As for the frustrated Falck, thwarted in his sabotage attempt, he doubles down, installing a switch in Bundy's control booth that will enable him to secretly flip control of their clients whenever he wants.

At the contest, there are complications. Ross, guided by Falck, performs well, but Claire is worried because her employer Bogdin Peshkov, whom she suspects of lusting after her, is present—and drunk. Sure enough, when Claire is denied first place, Peshkov makes a scene, whereupon Ballin orders him removed. Falck, seizing his chance to embarrass Ross, flips his switch, and his control of Ross is flipped to Bundy, currently controlling a ballet dancer; Ross pirouettes across the stage, slamming into Peshkov, who is now threatening the gathering with a pistol. As the shocked Bundy releases control, Ross himself takes charge and successfully restores order.

Far from being shamed, Ross is now a hero. The grateful Ballin hires him away from The Garment Gazette, and Mr. Nye at Telegog assures him that Falck's subterfuge has been discovered and the disgraced guide fired. He offers a free extension of its services in compensation for the trouble, but Ross declines. Newly confident in his own abilities, he has proposed to Claire and been accepted. But, Nye urges, suppose he prove bashful on his wedding night—? "No!" shouts Ross. "By gosh, there's some things I'm gonna do for myself!"

== Setting ==
The story is set in a near future similar to the era in which it was written, but in which the Soviet Union has been overthrown by a Capitalist revolution (The Peshkovs are former Communist apparatchiks living in exile), and characterized by unusually advanced developments in neurology.

== Reception ==
P. Schuyler Miller, reviewing it with the other stories in A Gun for Dinosaur and Other Imaginative Tales wrote "Lack confidence? Don't--as 'The Guided Man' did--let the operators of the Telagog Company take over for you." He considered it "distinctly late-model de Camp, commenting on the current scene--and especially the suburban, or more properly exurban scene--by projecting it into the future, where its 'things of custom' appear in all their incongruity. As the plot grows simpler and simpler, the settings and commentary carry more and more of the load, in the manner of an off-Broadway play. And there will be those who say the author has written himself into most of his rather put-upon heroes-in-spite-of-themselves."

Avram Davidson, on the other hand, found the collection "a great disappointment ... Time after time he gets hold of a great idea--and throws it away in playing for laughs of the feeblest conceivable sort." He singled out one exception, but it wasn't this one.

Robert Coulson, reviewing The Best of L. Sprague de Camp, wrote "'The Guided Man' is unsophisticated and unsure of himself in the big city, so he hires a firm of experts to guide him in crucial situations by actually taking over his body, with, of course, unexpected results, especially since one of the operators has designs on his client's girl friend. This is the sort of 'society fantasy' that the slick magazines of the era were buying, though this particular story was probably too scientific and too rowdy for them."

== Relation to other works ==
De Camp took a different approach to the theme of curing shyness in the similarly-titled "The Hibited Man" (1949), whose protagonist is subjected to an experiment that has the side-effect of removing his inhibitions.

== Projected film adaptation ==
In April 2006 the story was reported to have been optioned for film as a romantic comedy to be titled "Speechless," with Brian Dannelly as director and Adrien Brody and Lindsay Lohan in talks to star. The original adaptation was written by Steve Adams and the story updated by Dannelly and Michael Urban. According to Daily Variety, the adaptation involves an introverted man (Brody) so terrified of having to give a speech at a friend's wedding that he turns to a service allowing someone else (Lohan) to speak through him. Production was projected to start production later in 2006. The project was later shelved.
