= Demons and Dinosaurs =

1970 poetry collection by L. Sprague de Camp

- Dust-jacket illustration by Frank Utpatel for Demons and Dinosaurs
- Author: L. Sprague de Camp
- Cover artist: Frank Utpatel
- Language: English
- Genre: poetry
- Publisher: Arkham House
- Publication date: 1970
- Publication place: United States
- Media type: Print (Hardback)
- Pages: 72

Demons and Dinosaurs is a 1970 collection of poetry by American writer L. Sprague de Camp, published by Arkham House in an edition of 500 copies. It was de Camp's first book published by Arkham House. It was printed in the UK by Villiers Publications for Arkham House.

In addition to de Camp's poems, the book contains an introductory piece about the author by fellow writer Lin Carter.

Most of the poems in the collection were incorporated into de Camp's later poetry collections, Phantoms and Fancies and Heroes and Hobgoblins, though the arrangement was different in each instance.

The poems "Avebury," "Daydreams," "First Lake at Midnight," "Kaziranga, Assam," "Myself," and "The End of the Lost Race Story" are unique to this collection.

"Acrophobia," "Heroes," "Night," "Time," and "To R.E.H." are shared with Phantoms and Fancies only.

"The Ogre" is shared with Heroes and Hobgoblins only.

The remaining poems appear in all three collections.

The "Bessas the Bactrian" to whom the last seven poems are attributed is a character and occasional poet in de Camp's 1961 historical novel The Dragon of the Ishtar Gate, in which most of them were originally published. The attribution was subsequently dropped from those carried over into de Camp's later poetry collections.

== Contents ==
Demons and Dinosaurs contains the following:

- "About L. Sprague de Camp" by Lin Carter
- The Powers
  - "Creation"
  - "Ziggurat"
  - "Reward of Virtue"
  - "Transposition"
  - "The Gods"
- Crumbling Ruins
  - "Ruins"
  - "Avebury"
  - "The Great Pyramid of Giza"
  - "Nabonidus"
  - "Meroê"
  - "Tintagel"
  - "Tikal"
- Far Places
  - "The Little Lion of Font-de-Gaume"
  - "New Year's Eve in Baghdad"
  - "The Jungle Vine"
  - "Patnâ"
  - "Kaziranga, Assam"
  - "A Tale of Two John Carters"
- Other Times
  - "A Brook in Vermont"
  - "The Dragon-Kings"
  - "The Tusk"
  - "The Ogre"
  - "Sirush"
  - "Progress in Baghdad"
  - "Heldendämmerung"
  - "Nahr al-Kalb"
  - "The Sorcerers"
  - "Ghosts"
- The Storyteller's Trade
  - "A Skald's Lament"
  - "Old Heroes"
  - "To R.E.H."
  - "Où Sont les Planètes d'Antan?"
  - "Heroes"
  - "The End of the Lost-Race Story"
  - "Envy"
  - "Daydreams"
- Quatrains of Bessas the Bactrian"
  - "Myself"
  - "Faunas"
  - "First Lake at Midnight"
  - "Warriors"
  - "Acrophobia"
  - "Night"
  - "Time"
