= Let's Have Fun =

- Short story by L. Sprague de Camp
- Illustration of the story in Science Fiction Quarterly
- Country: United States
- Language: English
- Genre: Science fiction

Publication
- Published in: Science Fiction Quarterly
- Publisher: Columbia Publications, Inc.
- Media type: Print (Magazine)
- Publication date: May 1957

"Let's Have Fun" is a science fiction short story by L. Sprague de Camp. It was first published in the magazine Science Fiction Quarterly for May, 1957. It first appeared in book form in the collection A Gun for Dinosaur and Other Imaginative Tales (Doubleday, 1963), and afterwards appeared in the anthology Rare Science Fiction (Belmont, 1963). The story has been translated into German.

== Plot summary ==
Lofting is an alcoholic doctor stationed at the Terran Embassy on the planet Ahlia, noted for his benevolence to the reptilian alien natives. When he learns his old Ahlian friend Uzhegh has died he goes on a massive bender. Two friends at the embassy ply him with drink to find out why, and he reveals the story.

The events occur years before, at the time of the First Interplanetary Conference on Terra that set up the Confederated Planets. It is touch-and-go whether Ahlia will join, but vital to the agreement's success. Near the conference site, in the American suburb of Far Hills, five delinquent youths, Meehan, Fisher, Carmichael, Snow and Kraus, hang around looking for trouble, or as they view it, "fun." They spot Norman Riegel, an assistant professor of astromagnetics, out walking with the Ahlian delegate, Uzhegh of Kich. The delinquents haze the two until Uzhegh scares them off by baring his teeth and flicking his tongue. Asking Riegel why he suffered their taunts, the Ahlian learns that in Terra's overly-permissive legal environment teens can get away with practically anything, while those who try to rein them in risk prosecution. The two proceed on to the Scarron estate, where Norman and his wife Alice run a care center for offspring of the interstellar delegates. Doctor Lofting, at the time a local general practitioner, assists them by keeping their charges in good health. With the constitution ready to be signed and the young soon to be returned to their parents, a going-away party is being held.

Meanwhile, the five toughs plot vengeance for their humiliation. A brief encounter with Dr. Lofting cements their determination. They gather in disguise near the estate that evening, spying on the partying extraterrestrials until a storm breaks and they start going inside. One, the giddy, otter-like Gordonian Kranakiloa, dashes back out towards the empty swimming pool. Uzhegh's son, the responsible Tsitsav, follows to bring him back. At this point the delinquents make their move, rushing towards Kranakiloa with baseball bats; Tsitsav comes between them and takes the attack instead. They bash his skull in, though Meehan also suffers injuries. At this point Riegel and Lofting come to the rescue, and the youths flee, scattering. But Tsitsav is dead. Riegel and Lofting realize this will break up the conference, as there will be no justice for the murdered Ahlian; even if they could positively identify the culprits, as juveniles the law won't hold them responsible. They decide to report the death as an accident, a result of Tsitsav falling into the pool while trying to retrieve Kranakiloa. As the Gordonian has been frightened into hysteria by the storm and never saw the delinquents, they aren't contradicted.

Concluding his tale, Lofting tells his friends the lie stood, and as a result "there was a lot of grief and sympathy but no hostility," the conference was a success, and the agreement was signed, with Ahlia included. The Riegels, disgusted with Far Hills, moved away, and ultimately Lofting did as well. Wracked by guilt for having concealed the crime, he took to drink and got himself posted to Ahlia, where he has tried to "make it up to them" through good works. As for the delinquents, he notes that Meehan was eventually killed in a knife fight over a girl, Carmichael was jailed for burglary, Fisher died trying to fly his family's plane under a bridge, and the remaining two "grew up to be more or less normal adults." Some years later the Terran fad for permissive child-rearing gave way to a stricter disciplinary regime, "but from my point of view, the harm had been done."

== Reception ==
P. Schuyler Miller's comment on the tale takes a rather unrealistic lesson from it: "Fed up with the teen-age savages who congregate—in Pittsburgh the word is 'loaf'—in your neighborhood? Then stay out of the viciously adolescent-ridden future of 'Let's Have Fun.'" In its appearance in the anthology Rare Science Fiction he characterized it along with the other contents as "a good and varied lot of ... stories."

Avram Davidson found the story among most others in A Gun for Dinosaur and Other Imaginative Tales "a great disappointment," feeling the author "[t]ime after time ... gets hold of a great idea—and throws it away in playing for laughs of the feeblest conceivable sort."

== Relation to other works ==
De Camp also dealt with the theme of teens disrupting interplanetary relations in "The Egg" (1956), in which youngsters are endangered by alien offspring rather than vice versa. In his "Judgment Day" (1955), the maliciousness of juvenile delinquents is the catalyst for a physicist's decision to publish a discovery that will result in nuclear holocaust.
