= The Great Monkey Trial =

1968 book on the Scopes Trial by L. Sprague de Camp

- Dust-jacket for The Great Monkey Trial
- Author: L. Sprague de Camp
- Language: English
- Subject: History
- Publisher: Doubleday
- Publication date: 1968
- Publication place: United States
- Media type: Print (Hardback)
- Pages: 538 pp
- ISBN: 0-385-04625-1

The Great Monkey Trial is a book on the Scopes Trial by L. Sprague de Camp, first published in hardcover by Doubleday in 1968. The book is a non-fiction account of the trial, as well as its social and political context and impact. This history of the trial was based on the archives of the A.C.L.U., assorted newspaper files, correspondence and interviews with over a dozen of those present at the trial, books and magazine articles written on the trial (including the memoirs of John T. Scopes and the official record of the trial in the Rhea County Courthouse), and a couple of visits to Dayton. The book also contains several political cartoons published at the time of the trial. Several critics have referred to the book as the definitive or comprehensive account of the Scopes Trial.

== Content and perspective ==
In the preface, de Camp states that the book's goal is to "tell the story of the Scopes evolution trial of 1925, at Dayton, Tennessee, as truthfully as possible." De Camp rejects previous descriptions of the trial such as "a witch hunt", "a travesty of justice", or "a deathblow to Fundamentalism." Instead, de Camp classifies the trial as one battle in a long and ongoing war between two philosophical worldviews. The first, a "theistic view", sees the world as governed by entities that are sensitive to human sentiment and are not bound by natural law in their actions. The second, a "mechanistic view", sees the world as governed by absolute and unchanging natural laws, which gods cannot affect.

In summation of the trial's cultural impact, de Camp suggests that the public ridicule placed on the law by this trial may have influenced politicians against supporting other such "monkey laws". He also suggests that the trial accomplished its goal of raising public interest in evolution. In conclusion, de Camp states that the truth is always competing against many other factors in shaping public perception, but truth has the advantage of persistence.

== Style ==
The book frames the trial as a militaristic conflict, frequently using terms such as skirmish and combatant. Additionally, it includes chapter titles such as "The War Cries and Banners", "The Crusade" and "The Din of Battle Rises". Each chapter has a quote at the start which holds some relevance to its contents. These include historical examples of conflict between religion and science, such as selections from Darwin's Origin of Species and the Inquisition's Condemnation of Galileo, as well as more poetic statements on human nature from Shakespeare and Lewis Carroll.

== Reception ==
Reviews praised the book for its comprehensiveness. Several reviewers have commended the book for providing a factual and unbiased portrayal of the full story of the trial, as opposed to the fictionalized Inherit the Wind or the one-sided H.L. Mencken reporting that they claim shaped previous public perception of the Scopes trial. Some have held that this and other "books written specifically about the Scopes trial serve ... to reinforce the spirit of ridicule" associated with the trial.

Kirtley Mathers, one of the scientists who testified for the defense in the Scopes Trial, spoke highly of the book in a review that appeared in Science. Mathers referred to the book as the definitive account of the Scopes trial, praising its ability to capture both the atmosphere and the human element of the trial. Mathers also highly commended the research that went into the book. However, he notes one instance where he feels that de Camp misrepresents thoughts that may have gone through trial members' minds as things which were actually said in court. Mathers also notes several typographic errors, including a few relating to the dates of his own interviews.

== Relation to other works ==
The Scopes Trial was also the subject of a chapter in Darwin and His Great Discovery, written by the author in collaboration with his wife Catherine Crook de Camp and published in 1972.

== Bibliography ==
- Laughlin, Charlotte; Daniel J. H. Levack (1983). De Camp: An L. Sprague de Camp Bibliography. San Francisco: Underwood/Miller.
- De Camp, L. Sprague (1968). The Great Monkey Trial. Garden City, New York: Doubleday & Company, Inc. pp. [ix]–x.
- Mencken, H.L (2002). H.L Mencken on Religion. Prometheus Books.
- Kirkus Reviews
- Bernabo, Lawrance; Celeste Michelle Condit (1990). "Two Stories of the Scopes Trial: Legal and Journalistic Articulations of the Legitimacy of Science and Religion" in Popular Trials: Rhetoric, Mass Media, and the Law, edited by Robert Hariman. Tuscaloosa: The University of Alabama Press
- Staff, Caltech Engineering and Science Magazine, 1968, pp. 6
- Kirtley Mathers, Science, Vol 159 Issue 3815, pp. 616
