= The Carnelian Cube =

1948 novel by L. Sprague de Camp and Fletcher Pratt

- First edition
- Author: L. Sprague de Camp and Fletcher Pratt
- Cover artist: David Kyle
- Language: English
- Genre: Science fantasy
- Publisher: Gnome Press
- Publication date: 1948
- Publication place: United States
- Media type: Print (Hardback)
- Pages: 230

The Carnelian Cube is a science-fantasy novel by American writers L. Sprague de Camp and Fletcher Pratt. It was first published in hardcover by Gnome Press in 1948, and in paperback by Lancer Books in 1967. An E-book edition was published by Gollancz's SF Gateway imprint on September 29, 2011 as part of a general release of de Camp's works in electronic form. It has also been translated into Italian and German.

== Plot summary ==
The carnelian cube of the title is a small red "dream stone" confiscated by archaeologist Arthur Cleveland Finch from Tiridat Ariminian, one of the workers on the dig he is supervising in Cappadocia. It bears an inscription in Etruscan that appears to identify its original possessor as Apollonius of Tyana, and supposedly allows the bearer to attain the world of his dreams.

Finch, frustrated with the irrationality of his existence as an archaeologist, yearns for a more rational world in which he could realize his true dream of being a poet. Sleeping with the stone beneath his pillow he finds himself cast into a parallel world. It and later worlds visited by Finch tend to place him in or near his native Louisville, Kentucky rather than the Middle Eastern locale he starts out from, but Kentuckys that, while appearing to share much of the "real" world's history, have developed in radically alternate directions due to differences in their worlds' psychological or physical properties.

Finch's new home sets the pattern; it is entirely too rational, with its denizens acting solely from self-interest in a society organized on a strict patron-client basis. The regimentation extends to naming conventions: people's names are ordered surname first, given name second, and occupation last. Finch initially finds himself classed as "Finch Arthur Poet" — and is, indeed, a poet. Poets are, however, a low-classified occupation, with few perks, certainly as compared to the local patron, Sullivan Michael Politician. Finch's attempts at social climbing, while initially successful, also bring him enemies, eventually making his new world too hot for him. The stone had not made the trip with him, and Finch's only means of escaping this new and not entirely congenial existence is to purloin its counterpart from the local version of Tiridat.

With the rational world's counterpart stone, Finch dreams himself into a second parallel world, this one exemplifying the individualism he has missed in the rational world. But he finds the individualist world one of rampant vanity and violence, in which megalomaniacal bully-boys like Colonel Richard Fitzhugh Lee uneasily dominate a population of extreme egocentrics defensive of their "originality" and touchy about being told what to do. It is also a more fantastic place, in which claims of ESP or the ability to raise spirits tend to be real. Hiring a medium-provided spirit to do the dirty work, Finch again obtains his current world's counterpart of the carnelian cube and makes his escape, this time hoping to regain his original existence as an archaeologist reconstructing the past.

Finch awakens in yet another parallel world, only to find the stone has once again over-literalised his dream; his third world is one in which astrology-guided archaeologists really do reconstruct the past, drafting and magically conditioning vast numbers of people to reenact past events. He finds himself project head of a recreation of the Assyrian siege of Samaria, and quickly discovers the reenactment no mere fantasy; the brainwashed participants actually fight, kill and die in the furtherance of scientific knowledge. Caught up in the chaos, Finch faces execution at the order of the reenactor portraying usurping Assyrian king Sargon. "Sargon" turns out to be yet another version of Tiridat, who, like the others, is the possessor of this world's carnelian cube. Begging the cube from the "king" as a last request, Finch determines to escape once again by dreaming himself into a truly ideal world.

On this note the novel ends, with neither the protagonist's possible execution or projected escape recounted, leaving the plot open-ended and providing an obvious opportunity for a sequel. However, no such sequel ever appeared.

== Reception ==
A brief New York Times review by Isaac Anderson dismissed the novel as "fantasy in a heavy-handed sort of way", saying "as for the humor, the less said the better".

Frederik Pohl, writing in Super Science Stories, praised the authors as having "produced some of the funniest fantasies ever to see print." Noting that "The Carnelian Cube, almost alone among fantasy books, has never been published in magazine form" he "wonders how the magazines missed it."

Thrilling Wonder Stories praised the novel as "earthy, talkative, [and] frequently witty," saying "The authors have given full range to a pair of highly fertile imaginations and the reader does not suffer thereby."

Fantasy Review's Kemp McDonald faulted the novel as scattershot and plotless, saying that "Characters and scenes, individually well-drawn, pass and do not return, collectively insignificant. Loose ends and unexplained anomalies abound".

Astounding reviewer P. Schuyler Miller called the book "quite unlike anything else the reader will find on today's market," providing "more sheer entertainment than any the fantasy publishers have yet given us." He felt "The fantasy is a little more heavy-handed than in the other Pratt-de Camp books, the incongruities laid on thicker, but the familiar and heady flavor is still there" "although it may not quite measure up to ... previous books by these incomparable collaborators."

Amazing Stories, noting that The Carnelian Cube was "not quite up to the standards" of its authors' best work, found it "nevertheless a diverting (and at times) racy tale. ... definitely not great literature, but [offering] a pleasant few hours to any reader desiring amusement".

A. Langley Searles similarly found that although the novel "did not duplicate the high standards of its predecessors", readers "are sure to be entertained and often amused by it".

More recently, E. F. Bleiler wrote that the novel's settings were "ingeniously contrived and the adventures are well adapted to their environment, but the reader must be prepared to have his credulity strained, perhaps because of lack of unity."

== Relationship to other works ==
De Camp reused the concept of using brainwashed people to reenact the past in his later science fiction novel The Glory That Was.
