= A Gun for Dinosaur and Other Imaginative Tales =

1963 short story collection by L. Sprague de Camp

- first edition of A Gun for Dinosaur and Other Imaginative Tales
- Author: L. Sprague de Camp
- Cover artist: Gilda Kuhlman
- Language: English
- Genre: Science fiction short stories
- Publisher: Doubleday
- Publication date: 1963
- Publication place: United States
- Media type: Print (hardback)
- Pages: 359 pp

A Gun for Dinosaur and Other Imaginative Tales is a short story collection by American science fiction and fantasy author L. Sprague de Camp, first published in hardback by Doubleday in 1963, and in paperback by Curtis Books in 1969. The first British edition was issued by Remploy in 1974. It has also been translated into German.

== Contents ==
- "A Gun for Dinosaur"
- "Aristotle and the Gun"
- "The Guided Man"
- "Internal Combustion"
- "Cornzan the Mighty"
- "Throwback"
- "Judgment Day"
- "Gratitude"
- "A Thing of Custom"
- "The Egg"
- "Let's Have Fun"
- "Impractical Joke"
- "In-Group"
- "New Arcadia"

== Reception ==
Kirkus Reviews called the collection "a generous collection" by "[a]n established entertainer" with "a variety, inventivity and humor which gives this a definite superiority in the genre.

P. Schuyler Miller felt it "must represent just about the last grain spirits to be distilled from the de Campian mash" with "[m]most of the ... stories ... also distinctly late-model de Camp, commenting on the current scene--and especially the suburban, or more properly exurban scene--by projecting it into the future, where its 'things of custom' appear in all their incongruity. As the plot grows simpler and simpler, the settings and commentary carry more and more of the load, in the manner of an off-Broadway play. And there will be those who say the author has written himself into most of his rather put-upon heroes-in-spite-of-themselves." Miller singles out the title story as "one of the classic time-travel stories," and "Aristotle and the Gun" as "even better," but deems "Internal Combustion" "[o]ne of the best stories in the lot--because it is so unlike the rest."

S. E. Cotts calls the book "a well-deserved tribute to one of science fiction's steadiest and most well-rounded contributors," and the title story "one of my favorites," noting that "[i]ts subject, about a safari into the past, has been successfully tackled by other writers, but this version has solid merit."

Avram Davidson found the collection "a great disappointment," saying he could no longer enjoy de Camp's shorter work because the author "[t]ime after time ... gets hold of a great idea--and throws it away in playing for laughs of the feeblest conceivable sort." He deems "Judgment Day" the "sole exception ... it is so authentic-sounding that one could scream."
