= Hyperion Press =

Publishing company

- Status: Defunct
- Country of origin: United States
- Headquarters location: Westport, Connecticut

Hyperion Press was an American publishing company, based in Westport, Connecticut. In the 1970s, it published science fiction and science fiction studies – including reissues of several books first published by World Publ. Co. of Cleveland – and classic comics and mathematics. It published two different series. The first was in 1974. The second was in 1976.

It is not related to the Disney publisher established 1990 or its 21st-century descendant Hachette and Disney imprints Hyperion Books or Hyperion Books for Children.
