= The Eye of Tandyla =

- Short story by L. Sprague de Camp
- Virgil Finlay's illustration of the story in Fantastic Adventures
- Country: United States
- Language: English
- Genre: Fantasy

Publication
- Published in: Fantastic Adventures
- Media type: Print (Magazine)
- Publication date: May, 1951

Chronology
- Series: Pusadian series
The Tritonian Ring	The Owl and the Ape

"The Eye of Tandyla" is a fantasy story by American writer L. Sprague de Camp, part of his Pusadian series. It was first published in the magazine Fantastic Adventures for May, 1951, and first appeared in book form in de Camp's collection The Tritonian Ring and Other Pusadian Tales (Twayne, 1953). The story has also appeared in the magazine Fantastic for November 1965, the anthologies Time Untamed (1967), The Magic of Atlantis (1970), Wizards (1983), and The Mammoth Book of Seriously Comic Fantasy (1999) (also published as The Mammoth Book of Comic Fantasy II), and the de Camp omnibus collection Lest Darkness Fall/Rogue Queen/The Tritonian Ring and Other Pusadian Tales (2014). It has also been translated into French, Spanish, Italian, German and Russian.

== Plot summary ==
The sorcerer Derezong Taash, in the service of King Vuar the Capricious of Lorsk, is ordered to steal a magical gem from the temple of the goddess Tandyla in Lotri. The jewel is set as an eye in the goddess's statue. Together with his apprentice Zhamel Seh, Taash undertakes the errand, which goes suspiciously well; its guardians almost seem to want it stolen, while the gem itself appears to want to stay with him. With a sense of foreboding, Taash decides he must return his prize to the temple while tricking the king into thinking he has truly supplied it, thus becoming unwittingly embroiled in a plot against the throne that reaches to the very heart of the royal family.

Chronologically, "The Eye of Tandyla" is the second of de Camp's Pusadian tales, and the first to feature his protagonists Derezong Taash and Zhamel Seh. It is set some generations after The Tritonian Ring, King Vuar of Lorsk being stated in the book to be a descendant of that novel's King Zhabutir.

== Setting ==
In common with the other Pusadian tales, "The Eye of Tandyla" takes place in a prehistoric era during which a magic-based Atlantian civilization supposedly throve in what was then a single continent comprising Eurasia joined with Africa, and in the islands to the west. It is similar in conception to Robert E. Howard's Hyborian Age, by which it was inspired, but more astutely constructed, utilizing actual Ice Age geography in preference to a wholly invented one. In de Camp's scheme, the legend of this culture that came down to classic Greece as "Atlantis" was a garbled memory that conflated the mighty Tartessian Empire with the island continent of Pusad and the actual Atlantis, a barbaric mountainous region that is today the Atlas mountain range.

== Notes ==
Preceded by The Tritonian Ring	Pusadian series "The Eye of Tandyla"	Succeeded by "The Owl and the Ape"
