= The Rug and the Bull =

- Short story by L. Sprague de Camp
- Country: United States
- Language: English
- Genre: Fantasy

Publication
- Published in: Flashing Swords! #2
- Publisher: Doubleday
- Media type: Print (Hardback)
- Publication date: May, 1973

Chronology
- Series: Pusadian series
Ka the Appalling	The Stronger Spell

"The Rug and the Bull" is a fantasy short story by American writer L. Sprague de Camp, part of his Pusadian series. It was first published in the anthology Flashing Swords! #2, edited by Lin Carter (Doubleday, 1973). It has also been translated into Italian, German and Dutch.

== Plot summary ==
Gezun of Lorsk presents King Norskezhek of Torrutseish with a scheme to mass-produce magic carpets based on a sample in his possession, the Carpet of Khazi, which he had previously conned from the magician Larentius Alba of Ausonia. In furtherance of his plan, Gezun finds he must join forces with the president of the local magician's guild, who turns out to be Bokarri, the victim of another of his cons some eighteen years before (in "The Hungry Hercynian." The alliance is therefore a shaky one, and when the king turns on Gezun, Bokarri leaps at the chance to betray his partner. Transformed by the magician into a bull, the Lorskan discovers he has become the prime attraction in the next deadly contest in the local bullring.

Chronologically, "The Rug and the Bull" is the seventh of de Camp's Pusadian tales, and the fifth to feature his protagonist Gezun of Lorsk. Gezun is middle-aged at the time of this story, and possessed of a wife (Ro, whom he first met in "Ka the Appalling") and three children.

== Setting ==
In common with the other Pusadian tales, "The Rug and the Bull" takes place in a prehistoric era during which a magic-based Atlantian civilization supposedly throve in what was then a single continent consisting of Eurasia joined with Africa, and in the islands to the west. It is similar in conception to Robert E. Howard's Hyborian Age, by which it was inspired, but more astutely constructed, utilizing actual Ice Age geography in preference to a wholly invented one. In de Camp's scheme, the legend of this culture that came down to classic Greece as "Atlantis" was a garbled memory that conflated the mighty Tartessian Empire with the island continent of Pusad and the actual Atlantis, a barbaric mountainous region that is today the Atlas mountain range.

== Notes ==
Preceded by "Ka the Appalling"	Pusadian series "The Rug and the Bull"	Succeeded by "The Stronger Spell"
