= The Stronger Spell =

- Short story by L. Sprague de Camp
- R. G. Krenkel's illustration of the story in Fantasy Fiction
- Country: United States
- Language: English
- Genre: Fantasy

Publication
- Published in: Fantasy Fiction
- Media type: Print (Magazine)
- Publication date: November, 1953

Chronology
- Series: Pusadian series
The Rug and the Bull	—

"The Stronger Spell" is a fantasy short story by American writer L. Sprague de Camp, part of his Pusadian series. It was first published in the magazine Fantasy Fiction for November 1953, and first appeared in book form in de Camp's collection The Tritonian Ring and Other Pusadian Tales (Twayne, 1953). It has since been reprinted in the anthology The Mighty Barbarians, edited by Hans Stefan Santesson (Lancer Books, 1969). It was included in the omnibus de Camp collection Lest Darkness Fall/Rogue Queen/The Tritonian Ring and Other Pusadian Tales published in trade paperback by Gollancz in February 2014 and as an ebook by Gateway/Orion in March of the same year. It has also been translated into Dutch and German.

== Plot summary ==
After musical performer Suar Peial rescues the druid Gleokh from a murderous affray, the two celebrate the latter's deliverance in a local tavern. Gleokh holds forth on his revolutionary new weapon, an experimental gun. A general debate over the gun and its merits, and the threat it might pose to the Bronze Age culture in which the characters live. Midawan, an armorer, is worried it will render his profession obsolete, while Semkaf, a wizard from Typhon, is overcome by greed for the device. His apprentice attempts to kill Gleokh for it, only to be shot by the gun, whereupon Semkaf conjures up an invisible serpent to finish the job his servant started. Suar and Midawan are literally caught in the crossfire, and it falls to the armorer to save them both...

Chronologically, "The Stronger Spell" has no settled place in the chronology of de Camp's Pusadian tales. Critic John Boardman placed it last in the series on the grounds that the handgun represents a technological advance over weaponry seen in the other stories. De Camp himself had no fixed position in mind for the story.

== Setting ==
In common with the other Pusadian tales, "The Stronger Spell" takes place in a prehistoric era during which a magic-based Atlantian civilization supposedly throve in what was then a single continent consisting of Eurasia joined with Africa, and in the islands to the west. It is similar in conception to Robert E. Howard's Hyborian Age, by which it was inspired, but more astutely constructed, utilizing actual Ice Age geography in preference to a wholly invented one. In de Camp's scheme, the legend of this culture that came down to classic Greece as "Atlantis" was a garbled memory that conflated the mighty Tartessian Empire with the island continent of Pusad and the actual Atlantis, a barbaric mountainous region that is today the Atlas mountain range.

== Notes ==
Preceded by "The Rug and the Bull"	Pusadian series "The Stronger Spell"	Succeeded by none
