= The Hungry Hercynian =

- Short story by L. Sprague de Camp
- Lawrence Sterne Stevens’s illustration of the story in Universe Science Fiction
- Country: United States
- Language: English
- Genre: Fantasy

Publication
- Published in: Universe Science Fiction
- Media type: Print (Magazine)
- Publication date: December, 1953

Chronology
- Series: Pusadian series
The Owl and the Ape	The Stone of the Witch Queen

"The Hungry Hercynian" is a fantasy short story by American writer L. Sprague de Camp, part of his Pusadian series. It was first published in the magazine Universe Science Fiction for December, 1953, and first appeared in book form in the anthology The Spell of Seven, edited by de Camp (Pyramid Books, 1965). It has also been translated into German, and was first brought together with other works of de Camp in the German collection Die Chronik von Poseidonis (Pabel, 1978).

== Plot summary ==
The fugitive Gezun of Lorsk, seeking his fortune in the great city of Torrutseish, becomes enamoured with the slave girl Yorida. At his urging, she flees with him from the house of her master, the wizard Derezong Taash, only to be kidnapped by the conspirator Lord Noish as a pawn in the latter's plot to attain the position of chief minister to the king. Noish intends on using the girl as a bribe to secure the aid of the cannibalistic Hercynian shaman Zyc. Gezun must somehow spirit her out of the clutches of the nefarious duo while there is still time.

Noish successfully deposes of Lord Haldu, the chief minister, using Zyc's magical truth drug, but then refuses payment to the wizard Bokarri, who recommended Zyc, thus offending him. When Noish finally captures Yorida and delivers her to Zyc and his servant Kumo, the so-called Yorida is revealed to be a magical simulacrum. Enraged, the two men kill and eat Noish while Yorida remains more-or-less contentedly with Derezong. Meanwhile, Gezun leaves for more profitable pastures. He and Bokarri will re-encounter each other in the later tale "The Rug and the Bull."

Chronologically, "The Hungry Hercynian" is the fourth of de Camp's Pusadian tales, and the second to feature his protagonists Gezun of Lorsk, Derezong Taash, and Zhamel Seh.

== Setting ==
In common with the other Pusadian tales, "The Hungry Hercynian" takes place in a prehistoric era during which a magic-based Atlantian civilization supposedly throve in what was then a single continent consisting of Eurasia joined with Africa, and in the islands to the west. It is similar in conception to Robert E. Howard's Hyborian Age, by which it was inspired, but more astutely constructed, utilizing actual Ice Age geography in preference to a wholly invented one. In de Camp's scheme, the legend of this culture that came down to classic Greece as "Atlantis" was a garbled memory that conflated the mighty Tartessian Empire with the island continent of Pusad and the actual Atlantis, a barbaric mountainous region that is today the Atlas mountain range.

== Notes ==
Preceded by "The Owl and the Ape"	Pusadian series "The Hungry Hercynian"	Succeeded by "The Stone of the Witch Queen"
