= Ka the Appalling =

- Short story by L. Sprague de Camp
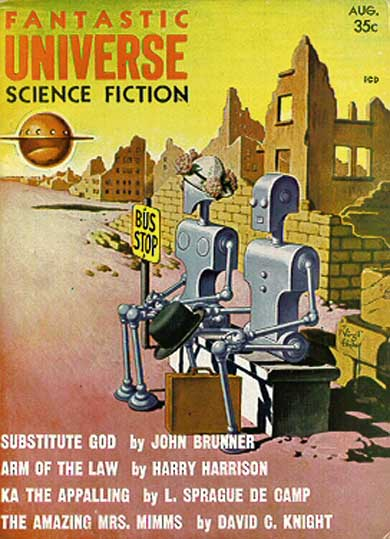
- Country: United States
- Language: English
- Genre: Fantasy

Publication
- Published in: Fantastic Universe
- Media type: Print (Magazine)
- Publication date: August, 1958

Chronology
- Series: Pusadian series
The Stone of the Witch Queen	The Rug and the Bull

"Ka the Appalling" is a fantasy story by American writer L. Sprague de Camp, part of his Pusadian series. It was first published in the magazine Fantastic Universe for August, 1958, and first appeared in book form in the anthology The Young Magicians, edited by Lin Carter (Ballantine Books, 1969). It was first brought together with other works of de Camp in his collection The Reluctant Shaman and Other Fantastic Tales (Pyramid Books, 1970). It has also been translated into French, German, and Italian.

== Plot summary ==
Gezun of Lorsk is saved from a mob in the city of Typhon by the larcenous wizard Ugaph, and enters his service as a hunter to help supply the bats consumed by the wizard's familiar Tety. He is warned away, inevitably futilely, from Ugaph's daughter Ro, his instructor in bat-hunting. After Ugaph is nearly caught attempting to rob the Temple of Ip, he and Gezun plot to con the fanatical Typhonians by pretending to represent a new god, Ka the Appalling, who requires offerings. Unfortunately, they do much too good a job at making their invented god real in the minds of their credulous marks.

Chronologically, "Ka the Appalling" is the sixth of de Camp's Pusadian tales, and the fourth to feature his protagonist Gezun of Lorsk. Gezun is about nineteen at the time of this story.

== Setting ==
In common with the other Pusadian tales, "Ka the Appalling" takes place in a prehistoric era during which a magic-based Atlantian civilization supposedly throve in what was then a single continent consisting of Eurasia joined with Africa, and in the islands to the west. It is similar in conception to Robert E. Howard's Hyborian Age, by which it was inspired, but more astutely constructed, utilizing actual Ice Age geography in preference to a wholly invented one. In de Camp's scheme, the legend of this culture that came down to classic Greece as "Atlantis" was a garbled memory that conflated the mighty Tartessian Empire with the island continent of Pusad and the actual Atlantis, a barbaric mountainous region that is today the Atlas mountain range.

Preceded by "The Stone of the Witch Queen"	Pusadian series "Ka the Appalling"	Succeeded by "The Rug and the Bull"
