= Inventions and Their Management =

1937 science book by Alf K. Berle and L. Sprague de Camp

- cover of first edition
- Author: Alf K. Berle and L. Sprague de Camp
- Language: English
- Subject: Patents
- Publisher: International Textbook Company
- Publication date: 1937
- Publication place: United States
- Media type: Print (Hardback)
- Pages: xiv, 733 pp

Inventions and Their Management is a science book by Alf K. Berle and L. Sprague de Camp. It was based on A Course on Inventing and Patenting by Howard Wilcox and Alf K. Berle, a series of nine papers presented by New York University in cooperation with Inventors Foundation, Inc., issued from 1933-1934. The Berle/de Camp version was published by the International Textbook Company in July 1937. It was reprinted, revised, in September 1940. A second edition was issued by the same publisher in April 1947 and was reprinted, revised, in January 1948, with a third printing in June 1948 and a fourth in June 1950. A third edition was issued by the same publisher in November 1951 and was reprinted, revised, in 1954. An additional printing was issued by Laurel Publishing in 1957. The work was revised and reissued under the new title Inventions, Patents, and Their Management by Van Nostrand in 1959. It was reprinted by Litton Educational publishers in 1968. The work has been translated into Japanese.

== First edition ==
The book contains a comprehensive study of invention as it relates to patents and patent law, trademarks, and copyright in the United States, with extensive exploration and citation of relevant court cases. It "aims to present a coordinated treatment of the problems confronting inventors and business men in developing ideas into industrial property of value." The stated intention is "to guide inventors in every aspect of their work, and to help them over the difficulties other inventors have met. It also teaches the language of invention, which is used by those attorneys, engineers, and executives who work extensively in this field, and, by giving a grasp of the legal, technical, and commercial terms having to do with invention, enables an inventor to understand these people and to make himself understood by them." "The cases that are narrated are taken from the actual experience of inventors, and of business men and attorneys who have dealt with inventions. They are selected to help clear up important points, and also to bring out the fact that every invention development or case differs from all others, and requires intelligent individual handling.

== Second edition ==
The stated object of the second edition "is to present in a single volume the principles and practices governing the technical, legal, and business procedures of invention, and thus to guide the many men and women who undertake to raise our standards of living by creative thought." According to the preface, "[t]he principal changes have been a discussion of the Lanham Act and the important influence it will have on U. S. trade-mark law when it goes into effect in 1947, and a new chapter on trends in industrial research and invention."

== Contents ==
From the third impression of the second edition.

- Preface.
- Chapter 1. History and Theory of Protection of Ideas; The Profession of Inventing; Forgie Jack Case.
- Chapter 2. Invention Procedure and Records; Piccoli Light-Switch Case.
- Chapter 3. What a Patent Grants; Jurisdiction of the Courts; Berliner Phonograph Case.
- Chapter 4. The United States Patent Office.
- Chapter 5. Sample Patents.
- Chapter 6. The Patent Laws; Limitations of Patents.
- Chapter 7. Patentable and Unpatentable Invention; Parker Turbine Case; Slawson Fare Box Case; Luks Dairy Apparatus Case; Reckendorfer Pencil Case; Morton Anesthetics Case.
- Chapter 8. Novelty; Claude Sea-Power Case.
- Chapter 9. Utility.
- Chapter 10. Public Use and Sale; Creager Roller Case.
- Chapter 11. Abandonment; Edison Lamp Case.
- Chapter 12. The Inventive Process; Calthorp Streamlined Train Case; Roters Heater Case.
- Chapter 13. Selection of a Patent Attorney; Segal Lock Case.
- Chapter 14. Analyzing, Classifying, and Bounding Inventions; Exeter Calculator Case.
- Chapter 15. Patent Searches; Clark Navigator Case.
- Chapter 16. Reading of Patents; Elsenheimer Punch Case; Wilkins Welder Case.
- Chapter 17. Study of the Market; Rainer Plating-Machine Case.
- Chapter 18. Preparation of Patent Applications; Haskin Rack Case.
- Chapter 19. Patent Drafting.
- Chapter 20. Prosecution of Patent Applications.
- Chapter 21. Study of the Product; Kendrick Pipe Case.
- Chapter 22. How Income from a Patent is Divided.
- Chapter 23. Employer-Employee Rights and Relations; Lowell Radio Case.
- Chapter 24. Promoters and Sales Agents.
- Chapter 25. Methods of Exploiting Inventions; Practicing the Invention.
- Chapter 26. Evaluating a Patent; Simon Electrotyping Case.
- Chapter 27. Finding a Buyer for a Patent.
- Chapter 28. The Sale of a Patent; Morehouse Toy Case.
- Chapter 29. Royalty Licenses; Holtzoff Disk Wheel Case.
- Chapter 30. Miscellaneous Methods of Exploiting Inventions; McCarthy Recordak Case; Ford Automobile Case.
- Chapter 31. Infringement; Selden Automobile Case.
- Chapter 32. Trade-Marks; Gilmore Trade-Mark Case.
- Chapter 33. Copyrights; Disney Cartoon Case.
- Chapter 34. Prints and Labels; Hodell Tire-Chain Case.
- Chapter 35. Accounting and Taxes in Relation to Patents.
- Chapter 36. The Antitrust Laws v. The Patent Laws; Johnson Paper Case.
- Chapter 37. Special Classes of Patents; Huron Meter Case.
- Chapter 38. Foreign Patents.
- Chapter 39. Patent and Trade-Mark Reform.
- Chapter 40. Invention and Research in Industry.
- Appendix.
- Glossary.
- Index and List of Cases.

== Significance in the career of de Camp ==
Inventions and Their Management was L. Sprague de Camp's first book; he went on to become a prominent science fiction and fantasy writer, as well as authoring a large number of additional non-fiction works.
