= The Owl and the Ape =

- Short story by L. Sprague de Camp
- W. E. Terry's illustration of the story in Imagination
- Country: United States
- Language: English
- Genre: Fantasy

Publication
- Published in: Imagination: Stories of Science and Fantasy
- Media type: Print (Magazine)
- Publication date: November, 1951

Chronology
- Series: Pusadian series
The Eye of Tandyla	The Hungry Hercynian

"The Owl and the Ape" is a fantasy story by American writer L. Sprague de Camp, part of his Pusadian series. It was first published in the magazine Imagination: Stories of Science and Fantasy for November, 1951, and first appeared in book form in the de Camp's collection The Tritonian Ring and Other Pusadian Tales (Twayne, 1953). The story has also appeared in the anthology Kingdoms of Sorcery (1976). and the de Camp omnibus collection Lest Darkness Fall/Rogue Queen/The Tritonian Ring and Other Pusadian Tales (2014). It has also been translated into German.

== Plot summary ==
Young Gezun of Lorsk, bound to the service of a sorcerer named Sancheth Sar, is sent by his master to bid on the Hordhum Manuscript, one of the magical effects of the retiring magician Dauskezh Van. The errand is complicated and the competition fierce, as the bidding is anonymous and his master's rival, Nikurteu Bayla, is also after the manuscript. But Gezun parries almost all of Bayla's stratagems.

Chronologically, "The Owl and the Ape" is the third of de Camp's Pusadian tales, and the first to feature his protagonist Gezun of Lorsk. Gezun is a teenager at the time of this story.

== Setting ==
In common with the other Pusadian tales, "The Owl and the Ape" takes place in a prehistoric era during which a magic-based Atlantian civilization supposedly throve in what was then a single continent consisting of Eurasia joined with Africa, and in the islands to the west. It is similar in conception to Robert E. Howard's Hyborian Age, by which it was inspired, but more astutely constructed, utilizing actual Ice Age geography in preference to a wholly invented one. In de Camp's scheme, the legend of this culture that came down to classic Greece as "Atlantis" was a garbled memory that conflated the mighty Tartessian Empire with the island continent of Pusad and the actual Atlantis, a barbaric mountainous region that is today the Atlas mountain range.

== Notes ==
Preceded by "The Eye of Tandyla"	Pusadian series "The Owl and the Ape"	Succeeded by "The Hungry Hercynian"
