= Pusad (disambiguation) =

Pusad may refer to:

- Pusad, a town in the Vidharbha region of the Indian state of Maharashtra
- Pusad (Vidhan Sabha constituency)
- Pusad, or Poseidonis, a fictional lost continent in the Pusadian series of short stories by L. Sprague de Camp that was supposedly one basis for the later Atlantis legend
