= Penn Foster (disambiguation) =

Penn Foster Group may refer to the distance education schools:

- Penn Foster Career School
- Penn Foster College
- Penn Foster High School
