= Eudoxus of Cyzicus =

Greek navigator and geographer

Eudoxus of Cyzicus (/ˈjuːdəksəs/ YOO-dək-səs; Greek: Εὔδοξος ὁ Κυζικηνός, romanized: Eúdoxos ho Kyzikēnós; fl. c. 130 BC) was a Greek navigator and diplomat who explored the Arabian Sea for Ptolemy VIII, king of the Hellenistic Ptolemaic dynasty in Egypt.

== Voyages to India ==
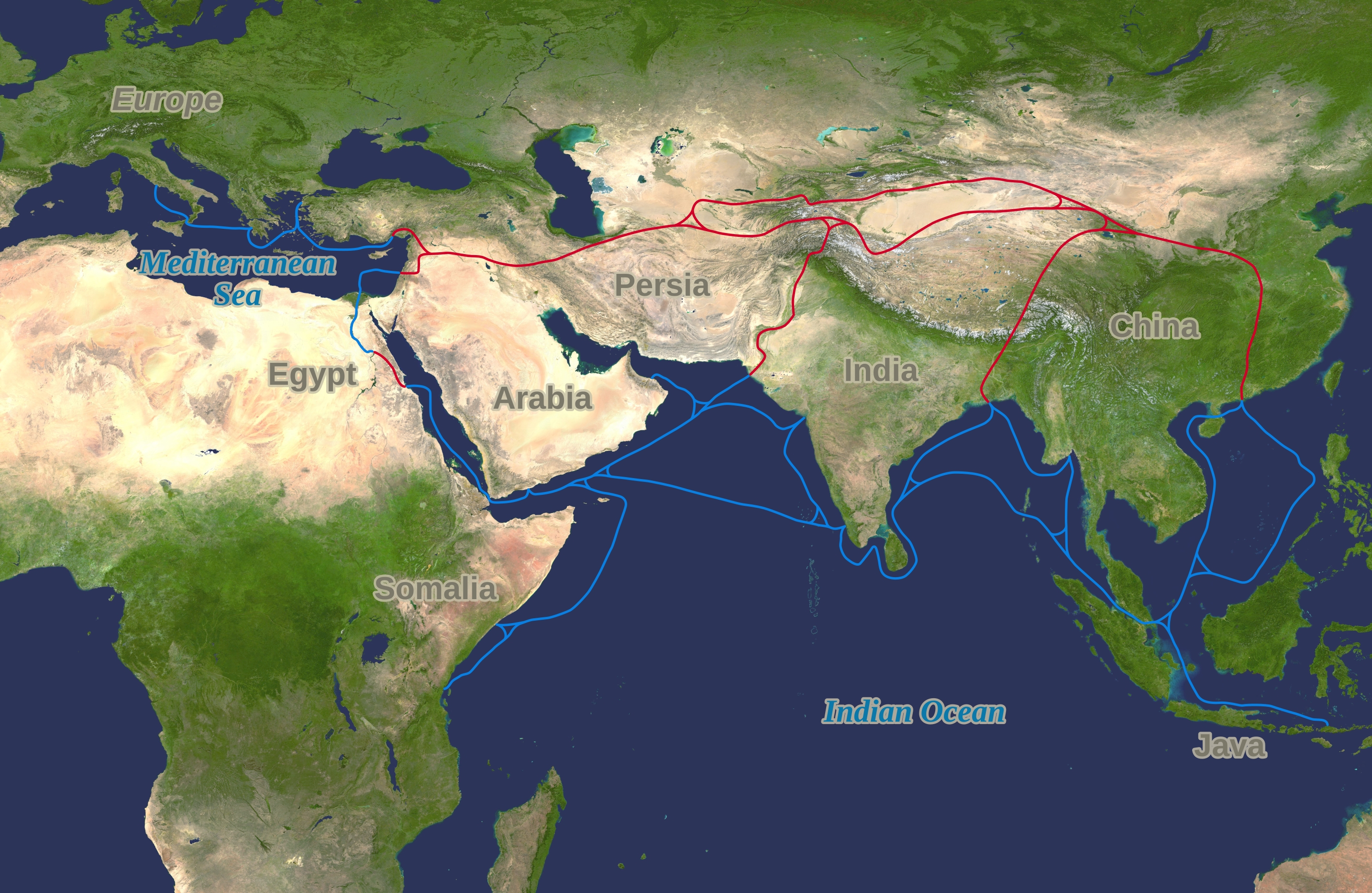
The Silk Road extending from southern Europe through Arabia, Somalia, Egypt, Persia, India and Java until it reaches China.

According to Poseidonius, later reported in Strabo's Geography, the monsoon wind system of the Indian Ocean was first sailed by Eudoxus of Cyzicus in 118 or 116 BC. Poseidonius said a shipwrecked sailor from India had been rescued in the Red Sea and taken to Ptolemy VIII in Alexandria. The unnamed Indian offered to guide Greek navigators to India. Egyptian ships had traditionally traveled to India by hugging the coast of the Arabian Peninsula, where ships were subject to tolls and pirating, so a separate route that crossed the sea appealed to Ptolemy VIII. Sailors also rarely made the whole journey to India, usually being met by a partner partway through the journey. Ptolemy appointed Eudoxus of Cyzicus to the task of finding a sea route, who was already in Alexandria as a herald for festivals held in honor of Persephone. Heralds for these festivals were usually elected by fellow citizens, suggesting that Eudoxus was well known and respected in Cyzicus. Eudoxus was reportedly very interested in geography and expressed desire to sail up the Nile. Eudoxus of Cyzicus made two voyages from Egypt to India. The first, in 118 BC, was guided by the Indian sailor. Eudoxus returned with a cargo of aromatics and precious stones, which was all seized by Ptolemy VIII. Ptolemy VIII died in 116 BC, so Eudoxus' second voyage was organized by the king's widow, Cleopatra III. Eudoxus navigated this second voyage in the same year, sailing without a guide. During his return journey, Eudoxus was blown off course and shipwrecked somewhere along the Somali Peninsula. By the time Eudoxus returned to Alexandria, Ptolemy IX was likely ruling Egypt, marking the date of Eudoxus' return as sometime before 107 BC. Upon Eudoxus' return to Alexandria, his cargo was again all seized by the king.

Another Greek navigator, Hippalus, is sometimes credited with having introduced Europe to the concept of monsoon wind route to India. He is sometimes conjectured to have been the pilot of Eudoxus' expeditions, but most scholars agree that this is untrue. In fact, modern scholars often question Hippalus’ very existence.

== African circumnavigation attempts ==
When Eudoxus was returning from his second voyage to India the wind forced him south of the Gulf of Aden and down the coast of Africa for some distance. Somewhere along the coast of East Africa, he found the remains of a ship. Due to its appearance and the story told by the natives, Eudoxus concluded that the ship was from Gades (later Cádiz), in Roman Hispania Baetica, and had sailed south around Africa. This inspired him to attempt a circumnavigation of Africa. After completing his second voyage to India, Eudoxus returned to Cyzicus and sold off his possessions to finance the circumnavigation. Organizing the expedition on his own account he set sail from Gades and began to work down the African coast. Eudoxus landed in Mauretania and made his way to the court of Bocchus I, where he attempted to secure patronage from the monarch to further finance his expedition. Bocchus I refused patronage to Eudoxus, who was forced to flee back to Gades.

After this failure he again set out to circumnavigate Africa. Very little is known about this second expedition, only that Eudoxus had not returned to Gades by 100 BC, the year that Poseidonius left the city. His eventual fate is unknown. Although some, such as Pliny, claimed that Eudoxus did achieve his goal, the most probable conclusion is that he perished on the journey.

It is often suggested that Eudoxus of Cyzicus believed the circumnavigation of Africa was possible because of the proposed theories of Eratosthenes of Cyrene. Eratosthenes, whose theories held a certain level of credibility during the Hellenistic period, theorized that the African continent held a trapezoidal shape and was much smaller than it really is, making rapid circumnavigation of the continent possible.

== Skepticism of the voyages' truth ==
Strabo, whose Geography is the main surviving source of the story, was skeptical about its truth. Modern scholarship tends to consider it relatively credible. During the 2nd century BC Greek and Indian ships met to trade at Arabian ports such as Aden (called Eudaemon by the Greeks). Attempts to sail beyond Aden were rare, discouraged, and involved a long and laborious coast-hugging journey. Navigators had long been aware of the monsoon winds. Indian ships used them to sail to Arabia, but no Greek ship had yet done so. For the Greeks to acquire the expertise of an Indian pilot meant the chance to bypass the Arabian ports and establish direct commercial links with India. Whether or not the story told by Poseidonius of a shipwrecked Indian pilot teaching Eudoxus about the monsoon winds is true, Greek ships were in fact soon using the monsoon winds to sail to India. By 50 BC there was a marked increase in the number of Greek and Roman ships sailing the Red Sea to the Indian Ocean.

It is, however, most likely that Eudoxus never succeeded in circumnavigating the African continent. One of the most outspoken proponents of the circumnavigation’s success was Poseidonius, who theorized that the African continent was much smaller than it actually is. The success of Eudoxus’ circumnavigation of Africa would have lent credence to Poseidonius’ theory.

== Impact ==
Eudoxus of Cyzicus’ discovery of a route to India that crossed the open sea made trade between India and Egypt more accessible. According to Strabo, the new sea route was not fully utilized under the Ptolemaic Dynasty, with no more than 20 vessels taking the route every year. The Indian exports seem to have held far greater value than the exports from Egypt, with Egypt mostly importing luxury and medicinal goods. It was not until the Roman annexation of Egypt that the sea route saw significant trade volume.

The discovery of the new sea route also appears to have led to the creation of a new office in the Ptolemaic courts: the commander in charge of the Red Sea and the Indian Ocean. It is generally believed that this position was created under the reign of Ptolemy IX, likely in 110 or 109 BC, but some scholars have suggested that the position did not exist until the middle of the first century BC, possibly under the reign of Cleopatra VII. Those who held this new position appear to have enjoyed a highly elevated status in society and were considered close to the ruler.

== In popular culture ==
Eudoxus (under the Greek spelling of his name, Eudoxos) is the narrator of L. Sprague de Camp's historical novel The Golden Wind.

== See also ==
- List of people who disappeared mysteriously at sea
