= The Golden Wind =

1969 historical novel by L. Sprague de Camp

- Dust-jacket illustration for The Golden Wind
- Author: L. Sprague de Camp
- Cover artist: Jennifer Parrott
- Language: English
- Genre: Historical novel
- Publisher: Doubleday
- Publication date: 1969
- Publication place: United States
- Media type: Print (Hardback)
- Pages: 288
- Preceded by: The Bronze God of Rhodes

The Golden Wind is a historical novel by American writer L. Sprague de Camp, first published in 1969, and telling the story of the Egyptian Greek seafarers Eudoxus of Cyzicus and Hippalus, who were the first in the Graeco-Roman world to travel by sea from Egypt to India in around 118 BCE.

It is the fifth and last of de Camp's historical novels, both in order of writing and terms of the historical episode described.

== Publication history ==
The novel was first published as hardcover by Doubleday in 1969, and in paperback by Curtis in 1972. The book was reissued with a new introduction by Harry Turtledove as a trade paperback and e-book by Phoenix Pick in July 2014. The novel has been translated into German.

== Plot summary ==
The novel concerns the adventures of Eudoxus of Cyzicus and Hippalus on the first voyages by sea from Egypt to India. Following these, it deals with Eudoxus' efforts to circumvent the newly established Egyptian monopoly on trade with India by pioneering a new route around the west coast of Africa, which are ultimately defeated by misadventure and the sheer extent of the continent.

== Reception ==
Publishers Weekly calls the book "a tale of high adventure, rich in historical lore and erudite in the telling. Of Mr. de Camp's … novels, this may well be the most ambitious and quite possibly the best." In contrast, Carol Ann Shine, writing for Library Journal, feels "Mr. de Camp has completely missed the mark in this story," which "moves slowly through stereotyped situations which would tax the imagination of the most gullible reader, and obvious and seemingly inappropriate philosophical discussions further delay the action." She rates it "for the faithful L. S. de Camp follower only … however, this title will disappoint even Mr. de Camp's large following."

The book was also reviewed (in German) by Horst Hermann von Allwörden in Fantasia 57/58, 1990.

== 1929 book by the same title ==
The same title was used for a story of adventure in China by Takashi Ohta (see Toshi Seeger) and Margaret Sperry, first published in 1929.

== Notes ==
Preceded by The Bronze God of Rhodes	Historical novels of L. Sprague de Camp; The Golden Wind	Succeeded by None
