= Time and Chance: An Autobiography =

1996 autobiography of L. Sprague de Camp

Time and Chance: an Autobiography
- Dust-jacket for Time and Chance: an Autobiography
- Author: L. Sprague de Camp
- Cover artist: Frank Kelly Freas and Thomas Canty
- Language: English
- Genre: Biography
- Publisher: Donald M. Grant, Publisher, Inc.
- Publication date: 1996
- Publication place: United States
- Media type: Print (Hardback)
- Pages: 444 pp
- ISBN: 1-880418-32-0
- OCLC: 36569358
- Dewey Decimal: 813/.52 B 21
- LC Class: PS3507.E2344 Z464 1996

Time and Chance: an Autobiography is the autobiography of science fiction and fantasy writer L. Sprague de Camp, first published in hardcover by Donald M. Grant, Publisher, Inc. in 1996. An E-book edition was published by Gollancz's SF Gateway imprint on September 29, 2011, as part of a general release of de Camp's works in electronic form.

== Summary ==
The book covers the writer's life and ancestry in a series of vignettes extending from the immigration of his ancestor Laurent de Camp to Nieuw Amsterdam in 1664 to his own move to Plano, Texas in 1989. The main focus is on his own life, travels, works, and friends in the writing community, such as Isaac Asimov and Robert A. Heinlein. There is little in the way of evaluation of his work, a task he leaves in the main for others, though he frequently makes note of people, places and incidents that inspired characters, locales and similar incidents in his fiction.

== Awards ==
The book won the 1997 Hugo Award for Best Non-Fiction Book and placed second in the 1997 Locus Poll Award for Best Non-Fiction.
