= The Ancient Engineers =

1963 science history book by L. Sprague de Camp

- First edition
- Author: L. Sprague de Camp
- Cover artist: Robert Flynn
- Language: English
- Subject: Engineering
- Publisher: Doubleday
- Publication date: 1963
- Publication place: United States
- Media type: Print (Hardback)
- Pages: 408 pp

The Ancient Engineers is a 1963 science book by L. Sprague de Camp, one of his most popular works. It was first published by Doubleday and has been reprinted numerous times by other publishers. Translations into German and Polish have also been published. Portions of the work had previously appeared as articles in the magazines Fate, Isis and Science Digest.

== Contents ==
The work is an examination of engineering through the ages from 3000 BC to 1519 AD, from the monumental works of the Egyptians through the speculative inventions of Leonardo da Vinci. The technological legacies of Mesopotamia, Egypt, Greece, Rome, China, the medieval Arabs and Europeans, and Renaissance Europe, are all covered in separate sections, focusing particularly on architectural, military and civil engineering.

== Review ==
The following review is often quoted in reference to this book:

Mr. de Camp has the trick of being able to show technology engaging in feats as full of derring-do as those of Hannibal's army. History as it should be told.

—Isaac Asimov, The New York Times Book Review, 15 May 1963

== See also ==
- Lest Darkness Fall
