= The Dragon of the Ishtar Gate =

1961 novel by L. Sprague de Camp

- First edition
- Author: L. Sprague de Camp
- Cover artist: Charles McCurry
- Language: English
- Genre: Historical novel
- Publisher: Doubleday
- Publication date: 1961
- Publication place: United States
- Media type: Print (Hardback)
- Pages: 429
- Followed by: The Arrows of Hercules

The Dragon of the Ishtar Gate is a historical novel by American writer L. Sprague de Camp, first published in hardcover by Doubleday in 1961, and in paperback by Lancer Books in 1968. The first trade paperback edition was issued by The Donning Company in 1982. The book was reissued with a new introduction by Harry Turtledove as a trade paperback and ebook by Phoenix Pick in September 2013. It has also been translated into German. It is the third of de Camp's historical novels in order of writing, and earliest chronologically. It is set in 466-465 BCE, the last years of the reign of King Xerxes I of Persia.

== Plot summary ==
The novel concerns the quest of Bessas of Zarispa, a young officer of the "Immortals" regiment, for the ingredients of a potion that the King has been told will give him immortality; the blood of a dragon and the ear of a king. Unbeknownst to Bessas, the third ingredient is the heart of a hero, and therefore Bessas' own.

Relying on information given him by the priests of Marduk in Babylon that a reptile depicted in reliefs on their temple, the sirrush, is a real dragon and lives at the headwaters of the Nile, Bessas sets out for the source of the Nile, accompanied by his former tutor, Myron of Miletos, who is bored of teaching and wants to make a name for himself in the field of philosophy.

== Reception ==
Harry Cavendish calls the novel "possibly ... the author's most breezily amusing venture into fictionizing classical lore," in which "[c]omic opera attacks and nocturnal ambushes abound ... There obviously is a lot of fictional hocus-pocus in all this, but there's also a shimmering mirthfulness in the writing." Martin Levin characterizes the book as "a gore-spattered delight with a nod to archaeological deduction, Herodotus, Pliny and perhaps Edgar Rice Burroughs. ... An antiquarian as well as a science-fiction writer, Mr. De Camp seasons this full-bodied adventure novel with masses of ancient lore and an educated zest for exotic geography." Barbara Copeland writes "L. Sprague de Camp uses his talents for writing fantasy and weird fiction to concoct a swashbuckling historical novel. Full of violence and blood, like the cruel age in which it is set, the story leads the reader on a hair-raising expedition." On the down side, she notes that "[i]n his efforts for authenticity, De Camp has so liberally laced the book with tongue-twisting classical names and archaic phrasing that it is actually difficult to read rapidly." The Booklist rates the story as "[a] colorful, vigorous, and outspoken tale that will appeal to masculine readers of the author's historical and science fiction." Don Adrian Davidson calls it "[a] long, well-written, picaresque novel," that "is excepted from the classification of the straight historical novel only by the Conan-like stature of its hero." Robert Coulson, commenting on the Starblaze edition, states that it remains "[g]reat entertainment if you missed it the first time around ... Even if you read it then, the original edition wasn't embellished by Steve Fabian artwork, so you might want this anyway. ... the characters and the wry humor make it entertaining."

The book was also reviewed by George H. Scithers in Amra v. 2, no. 19, February 1962, Baird Searles in Isaac Asimov's Science Fiction Magazine, June 1983, Robert Coulson in Amazing Science Fiction, September 1983, Thomas A. Easton in Analog Science Fiction/Science Fact, September 1983, and (in German]) by Horst Hermann von Allwörden in Fantasia 57/58, 1990.

== Notes ==
Preceded by None	Historical novels of L. Sprague de Camp; The Dragon of the Ishtar Gate	Succeeded by The Arrows of Hercules
