= The Arrows of Hercules =

1965 novel by L. Sprague de Camp

- Dust-jacket illustration for The Arrows of Hercules
- Author: L. Sprague de Camp
- Cover artist: Charles McCurry
- Language: English
- Genre: Historical novel
- Publisher: Doubleday
- Publication date: 1965
- Publication place: United States
- Media type: Print (hardback)
- Pages: 297
- Preceded by: The Dragon of the Ishtar Gate
- Followed by: An Elephant for Aristotle

The Arrows of Hercules is an historical novel by American writer L. Sprague de Camp, first published in hardback by Doubleday in 1965 and in paperback by Curtis Books in 1970. The book was reissued with a new introduction by Harry Turtledove as a trade paperback and ebook by Phoenix Pick in April 2014. It is the fourth of de Camp's historical novels in order of writing, and second chronologically, set in the time of Dionysios I of Syracuse at the end of the 5th and beginning of the 4th centuries BC.

== Plot summary ==
The protagonist is the engineer Zopyros of Tarentum, a follower of the Pythagorean philosophical school. Having invented an improved type of catapult, he is drafted into Syracuse's war effort against Carthage by the tyrant Dionysios, creator of the first military ordnance department known to history. The historical Battle of Motya of 399 BC is a major event in the novel. Also portrayed is the incident upon which the legend of the Sword of Damocles is supposedly based.

The Arrows of Hercules by L. Sprague de Camp, Curtis Books, 1970

== Reception ==
Contemporary reviews of the novel were favorable. Shildes Johnson in Library Journal "highly recommended" the book, calling it "[a]n intriguing novel" and a "fascinating historical romance which is a worthwhile addition to any library." The author "makes his characters live, and the reader can almost imagine the social, economic, and religious milieu of this period in Grecian history."

Jackie Pettycrew in The Arizona Republic deemed it a "rousing piece of fiction" with an "abundance" of action whose "pace is rapid and unrelenting." She rated it an "[a]ltogether, highly entertaining, lightly informative" book bringing ancient history "vividly to life."

Booklist noted its "[a]uthentic background and synthetic [sic: sympathetic] characters mingle easily in a story where action, color, page, and plot have the virile appeal evident in the author's The dragon of [the] Ishtar Gate."

Edith Farr Ridington in Classical World called it "an adventurous, breezy tale" with "exciting and quite believable adventures" written "in a colloquial style that helps to make ancient times come alive" and which "uses to good advantage the author's special interest in ancient engineering." She notes that "[t]he book is spiced here and there with some frank sexualities; otherwise its appeal would seem to be especially to young people interested in a story combining mechanical devices with adventure."

The book was also reviewed by Fritz Leiber in Amra v. 2, no. 35, July 1965.

== Notes ==
Preceded by The Dragon of the Ishtar Gate	Historical novels of L. Sprague de Camp; The Arrows of Hercules	Succeeded by An Elephant for Aristotle
