= The Tritonian Ring =

Heroic fantasy novel by Lyon Sprague de Camp

- first stand alone edition of The Tritonian Ring
- Author: L. Sprague de Camp
- Cover artist: Frank Frazetta
- Language: English
- Series: Pusadian series
- Genre: Heroic Fantasy
- Publisher: Paperback Library
- Publication date: 1968
- Publication place: United States
- Media type: Print (Paperback)
- Pages: 224 pp
- Followed by: "The Eye of Tandyla"

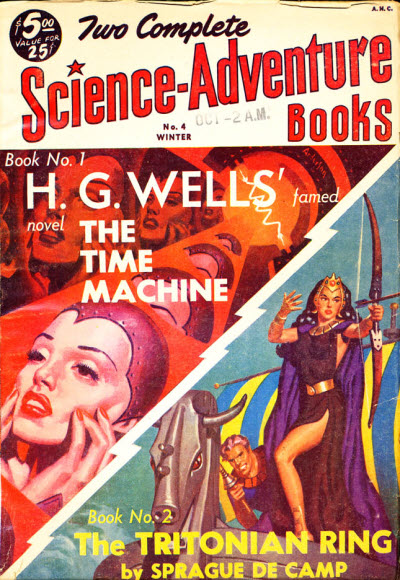
The Tritonian Ring was originally published in Two Complete Science-Adventure Books in 1951.

The Tritonian Ring is a heroic fantasy novel written by L. Sprague de Camp as part of his Pusadian series. It was first published in the magazine Two Complete Science Adventure Books for Winter, 1951, and first appeared in book form in de Camp's collection The Tritonian Ring and Other Pusadian Tales (Twayne, 1953). Its first publication as a stand-alone novel was as a paperback by Paperback Library in 1968; the first hardcover edition was from Owlswick Press in 1977. An E-book edition was published as The Tritonian Ring and Other Pasudian [sic] Tales by Gollancz's SF Gateway imprint on September 29, 2011 as part of a general release of de Camp's works in electronic form.

It has also been translated into Italian, Dutch, German and Russian, and was listed in Michael Moorcock and James Cawthorn's Fantasy: The 100 Best Books.

== Plot summary ==
When the gods resolve to destroy Lorsk, principal kingdom of the sinking continent of Pusad, because Prince Vakar, heir to its throne, is thought to be a threat to them, the king sends the prince on a quest to save the realm from destruction. Vakar is tasked with traveling the known world in search of what the gods most fear, accompanied only by his servant, Fual. He finds himself hampered by ignorance of just what that might be and continual attempts to murder him by parties unknown; meanwhile, his treasonous brother Kuros is plotting with the pirates of the Gorgon Isles, Lorsk's enemies, to overthrow their father. On his quest Vakar encounters Amazons, a seductive queen who is under a spell, an amorous centauress, sorcerers who command legions of headless warriors, and the dangerous Gorgonians themselves, masters of the medusas with their paralyzing glares.

== Setting ==
In common with the other Pusadian tales, The Tritonian Ring takes place in a prehistoric era during which a magic-based Atlantian civilization supposedly throve in what was then a single continent comprising Eurasia joined with Africa, and in the islands to the west. It is similar in conception to Robert E. Howard's Hyborian Age, by which it was inspired, but more astutely constructed, utilizing actual Ice Age geography in preference to a wholly invented one. In de Camp's scheme, the legend of this culture that came down to classic Greece as "Atlantis" was a garbled memory that conflated the mighty Tartessian Empire with the island continent of Pusad and the actual Atlantis, a barbaric mountainous region that is today the Atlas mountain range.

Chronologically, The Tritonian Ring is the first of de Camp's Pusadian tales, preceding the others by several generations.

== Critical reception ==
Groff Conklin, reviewing the Twayne edition, described De Camp's work as "in the Conan tradition in every sense of the word, though better written." Galaxy columnist Floyd C. Gale praised de Camp, who "did a remarkable job when he tossed his inhibitions to the wind and out-Conaned Conan." P. Schuyler Miller recommended the story for its "pure swashbuckling fun with a touch of bawdiness." The Hartford Courant's R. W. Wallace praised it as "extravagant adventure" marked by "zany dialogue." Boucher and McComas, however, dismissed Tritonian Ring as "one of those endless tales of a prehistoric (or more precisely, non-historic) kingdom of swordplay and bloodshed, which seem to us to bear little relation to science fiction or fantasy."

== Similarity to the Novarian series ==
There are many similarities between the Pusadian tales and de Camp's later Novarian series, though that is set in more technologically advanced world than the Pusadian Bronze Age culture. Both the Pusadian Prince Vakar and the Novarian King Jorian are pragmatic protagonists, who go through various perils which makes them unashamedly frightened; both go on a dangerous quest for a magical object and encounter powerful wizards without having magic power themselves; both express throughout their wish to end their adventures and live a simple happy life; both are involved in dalliance with attractive women which they encounter on their way, but seek—and eventually achieve—happy nuptial bliss with one beloved woman; and in the end both Vakar and Jorian renounce without regret a Royal throne in favor of a less lofty but more happy life. Some details are repeated in both series, for example the survival of mammoths and use of them in warfare, and the hordes of savage desert dwellers sweeping to wreak terrible destruction on settled lands. In both series the depiction of strange lands and customs gives de Camp ample room for satire; for example, the society of the pacifist, nudist Gamphasantians, who on closer examination turn out to be horribly bigoted and narrow-minded, failing to live up to their professed lofty principles and coming to a terrible bad end of which Prince Vakar tries in vain to warn them.

Preceded by none	Pusadian series The Tritonian Ring	Succeeded by "The Eye of Tandyla"
