= ICS Learn =

UK for-profit online college

- Industry: Education
- Founded: USA 1889
- Headquarters: Glasgow, Scotland
- Products: Online Learning Courses
- Website: ICS Learn (United Kingdom)

ICS Learn, also known as International Correspondence Schools Ltd, is a provider of online learning courses in the UK. It was founded in 1889 in Scranton, Pennsylvania. The UK branch was set up in 1904, and it now serves around 25,000 current students. Its students are based in more than 100 countries, predominantly in the UK but also across the Middle East, Asia, and Ireland.

It has a large share of the market in CIPD Human Resources and Learning & Development courses and online GCSEs and A Levels. It also provides professional qualifications and apprenticeships in accountancy, IT, marketing, procurement, leadership, project management, corporate governance, and finance.

== Accreditation ==
ICS Learn courses are accredited by a number of awarding bodies, including:

- Association of Accounting Technicians (AAT)
- AQA
- British Computer Society (BCS)
- Chartered Institute of Personnel and Development (CIPD)
- Chartered Institute of Marketing (CIM)
- Chartered Institute of Purchasing & Supply (CIPS)
- Chartered Management Institute (CMI)
- Edexcel
- Institute of Leadership & Management (ILM)
- PeopleCert (PRINCE2)
- The Corporate Governance Institute (CGI)
- The London Institute of Banking & Finance (LIBF)

== History ==
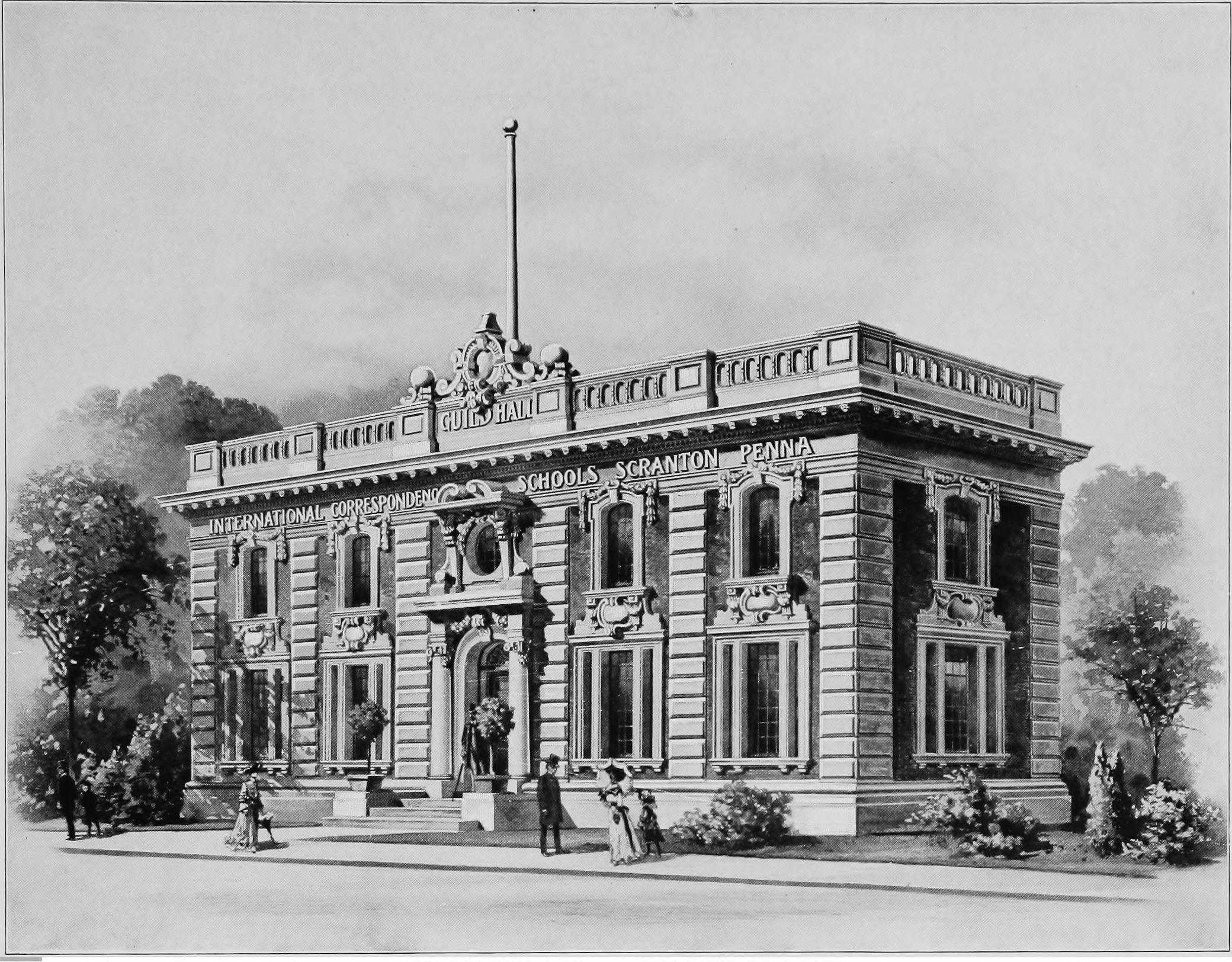
The building of the International Correspondence Schools erected at the St. Louis Worlds Fair.

Textbook department -- International Correspondence Schools, Scranton PA about 1908

ICS Learn was founded in 1889 in Scranton, Pennsylvania by journalist and editor of the Mining Herald*, Thomas J. Foster. Alarmed by frequent mine accidents, Foster advocated better working conditions and stricter safety regulations, which led to Pennsylvania's adoption of the Mine Safety Act of 1885 and the requirement for miners to pass a safety exam. In order to help workers pass the new test, Foster began an advice column in the Mining Herald answering mine safety questions.

Unsatisfied with this solution, in 1889 he founded the Colliery Engineer School of Mines, the first distance learning institution in the United States. The organisation changed names several times, settling on International Correspondence Schools of Scranton by 1900.

The mission of the school was to, "provide practical men with a technical education, and technical men with a practical education." To achieve its goal, ICS did not instruct its students by standard textbooks, which it believed often contained extraneous amounts of material and "demand[ed] too great a knowledge of mathematics and other subjects." Instead, ICS created its own specially prepared "Instruction and Question Papers," which provided exactly the information the student needed and questioned them only on that material.

Thomas Coates of Peckville, Pennsylvania, was the first enrolled student of ICS. He enrolled in the complete coal mining course on October 16, 1891. He advanced steadily with the Delaware and Hudson Coal Company in Plymouth, Pennsylvania, and eventually became the mine's superintendent.

It enrolled 3,000 new students in 1894 and, with the creation of a sales force, matriculated approximately 100,000 new students annually in the early 1900s. By 1900, one in 27 Americans had taken a correspondence course with ICS. The Pennsylvania Magazine of History and Biography states that it is "by far the largest single educational institution in America’s history".

Foster remained the president of ICS until his death in 1936 at age 93.

The organisation expanded to the UK in 1904 which is now known as ICS Learn. The US branch is known as Penn Foster Career School and is not connected to ICS Learn.

· *This publication was also named The Colliery Engineer and Colliery Engineer and Metal Miner.

== See also ==
- Penn Foster – American online education organization
