= Ancient Ruins and Archaeology =

Book by Lyon Sprague de Camp

- Dust-jacket for Ancient Ruins and Archaeology
- Author: L. Sprague de Camp and Catherine Crook de Camp
- Language: English
- Subject: Archaeology
- Publisher: Doubleday
- Publication date: 1964
- Publication place: United States
- Media type: Print (Hardback)
- Pages: 294 pp

Ancient Ruins and Archaeology is a 1964 science book by L. Sprague de Camp and Catherine Crook de Camp, one of their most popular works. It was first published in hardcover by Doubleday in 1964, and reprinted under the same title by Barnes & Noble Books in 1992. The first British and paperback edition was issued by Fontana in 1972 under the title Citadels of Mystery, which was the de Camps' original working title; this title was retained by the first American paperback edition, issued by Ballantine Books in April 1973 and reprinted in February 1974. Translations into French, German and Portuguese have also appeared. Portions of the work had previously appeared as articles in the magazines Astounding Science Fiction, Fate, Frontiers, Natural History Magazine, Other Worlds Science Stories, Science Fiction Quarterly, and Travel.

== Content ==
The work is a guide to a dozen of the more famous ruins from peoples of ancient times throughout the world, the speculations surrounding their fates, and modern fantasy literature inspired by them. The surveyed sites include Tartessos, the Pyramids of Giza, Stonehenge, Troy, Ma'rib, Great Zimbabwe, Tintagel, Angkor, the Mayan city of Tikal, the Inca city of Machu Picchu, Nan Matol, and the Moai of Rapa Nui.

== Reception ==
Francis D. Lazenby, in the Library Journal, called the book a "highly literate volume" whose "fascinating" accounts "are not simply another retelling: unusual material is added, and in very readable prose, with witty and humorous comments throughout. ... The maps are most helpful; the bibliography is comprehensive; and the notes--mirabile dictu!--are meaningful (not always so in books of this nature). Ancient Ruins and Archaeology should appeal to a wide clientele, for it is popularization at its best. Recommended for any library.

Edward B. Garside in The New York Times calls the book "delightful reading," "a fine popularization, written with great verve, yet based on solid fact." He finds it "quite different from what its rather formal title might lead one to expect. The de Camps tell about ... famous ruins in such a way that they can be watched ... emerging ... from the mists of romance and legend into the more certain light of modern archeology. By playing off folklore and fancy against archeological fact, they humanize their otherwise alien antiquities, while giving us a pleasurable sense of sharing in archeology's gradual discovery of their true history and meaning."

Orville Prescott, writing for the same paper, states "[a] livelier introduction to these ruins and mysteries could not be found." "The de Camps as a team write with the same breezy zest that has added flavor to Mr. de Camp's many earlier books. / All 12 chapters in "Ancient Ruins and Archaeology" are informative and entertaining. And many of them are unusual because of the scornful relish with which the de Camps demolish the absurd theories, fantastic fantasies and crackpot prophecies of cultists and hoaxers." He finds them "expert in condensing archaeological, anthropological and historical facts. And they have the good sense to admit frequently that much of what we would like to know is still unknown." He questions the relevance of the chapters debunking the legends of Atlantis and King Arthur but feels the book's chief trouble is that "[s]o much has been written recently about the pyramids, Troy and Mycenae that anyone attracted by this book has probably read other capable accounts of them." He concludes nonetheless that "[a]nyone who has never read about these matters should find [the book] briskly entertaining."

Fritz Leiber, reviewing the American paperback edition in Fantastic, calls it "[a] beautifully satisfying book about all those 'lost civilizations' that were the ultimate symbols of mystery to me when I was a child and some of them were just being discovered ... what they're like to visit today, the various crackpot and more respectable theories about them, [and] the fantasy uses to which they've been put."
