= The Bronze God of Rhodes =

1960 novel by L. Sprague de Camp

- Dust-jacket illustration of The Bronze God of Rhodes
- Author: L. Sprague de Camp
- Cover artist: Alice Smith
- Language: English
- Genre: Historical novel
- Publisher: Doubleday
- Publication date: 1960
- Publication place: United States
- Media type: Print (hardback)
- Pages: 406
- OCLC: 01432125
- Preceded by: An Elephant for Aristotle
- Followed by: The Golden Wind

The Bronze God of Rhodes is a historical novel by American writer L. Sprague de Camp. It was first published in hardcover by Doubleday in 1960, and in paperback by Bantam Books in 1963. A trade paperback edition was projected by The Donning Company for 1983, but never published. The book was reissued with a new introduction by Harry Turtledove as a trade paperback and ebook by Phoenix Pick in June 2013. It is the second of de Camp's historical novels in order of writing, and fourth in internal chronology.

== Plot summary ==
The novel is written in first person, purporting to be the memoirs of Chares of Lindos, the sculptor of the Colossus of Rhodes. It concerns his return to Rhodes, his attempts to set up as a sculptor, his struggles with his family's wishes that he enter their bronze foundry, his experience as a catapult artilleryman during the Siege of Rhodes (305 BC), and his complicated adventures in Ptolemaic Egypt. The Rhodian portions of the story are enlivened by the presence of Celtic foreigner Kavaros, who rises from Chares' slave to fellow soldier, friend, and sculpting assistant, and ultimately saves his former master's life. The atmosphere of the novel is lightened by Kavaros' entertaining, pointed and improbable tales of his supposedly superhuman ancestor Gargantuos (presumably de Camp's nod to the giant Gargantua, a character in the works of François Rabelais). The planning and building of the Colossus in commemoration of the city's successful defense occupies the closing portion of the book.

De Camp brings in numerous other historical personages of the era, notably Chares' sculpting mentor Lyssipos of Sikyon, the mathematician Eukleidēs, Babylonian historian Berossos (initially as a member of the sculptor's catapult crew), Rhodes's antagonists Demetrios Poliorketes and Antigonus, Egyptian historian Manethos, Egyptian king Ptolemaios, and Demetrios of Phalerum, reputed founder of the Library of Alexandria. A number of the book's characters are introduced in a symposion Chares attends early on, conducted by a group dubbed "The Seven Strangers," modeled on de Camp's own real-life social club the Trap Door Spiders.

The Bronze God of Rhodes by L. Sprague de Camp, Bantam Books, 1963

== Reception ==
Henry Cavendish, writing for the Chicago Daily Tribune, called the book "something of a modern masterpiece ... one of the most pleasantly informative [and] sheerly entertaining books in too long a while."

Robert Payne in The Saturday Review deems the difficulty in setting a novel in the Hellenistic era "to find a central character who will represent the quintessence of those times," a problem "de Camp has brilliantly solved ... by choosing Chares of Lindos, ... a sympathetic character [with] the charm of a character in a good picaresque novel." He finds de Camp "in his element" in the Rhodian scenes, noting that "[w]henver he writes of Greeks and purely Greek affairs, he writes masterfully," but considers "[t]he Egyptian adventure ... pretty terrible."

Elizabeth C. Winship in The Boston Globe calls the book "a slow starter [it] but picks up tremendously," with "the battles ... many and lively and the engines of war highly ingenious." She feels the "long trips to Syria and Egypt ... extend this rich picture of life around the Mediterranean over 2000 years ago" but thinks the speech, "[a]s is the case in many historical novels, ... a bit stilted, sprinkled with 'forsooths' and 'impudent rogues.'"

Richard Match in The New York Times calls it a "fine novel" and "a lively picaresque tale," noting that "[w]hen a man writes a historical novel without a conventional love story (as Mr. de Camp has here), you can be sure he's dedicated. His dedication is to the age of Alexander the Great, which is rapidly becoming his private literary preserve. ... For the discriminating minority of readers who are inclined to care too, 'The Bronze God' will be an unusual treat."

The novel was also reviewed by Damon Knight in The Magazine of Fantasy & Science Fiction, June 1960, and Juanita Coulson in Amra v. 2, no. 19, February 1962.

== Notes ==
Preceded by An Elephant for Aristotle	Historical novels of L. Sprague de Camp; The Bronze God of Rhodes	Succeeded by The Golden Wind
