= The Tritonian Ring and Other Pusadian Tales =

1953 collection of stories by L. Sprague de Camp

- first edition of The Tritonian Ring and Other Pusadian Tales
- Author: L. Sprague de Camp
- Language: English
- Series: Pusadian series
- Genre: Fantasy
- Publisher: Twayne Publishers
- Publication date: 1953
- Publication place: United States
- Media type: Print (hardback)
- Pages: 262 pp

The Tritonian Ring and Other Pusadian Tales is a 1953 collection of stories by American science fiction and fantasy author L. Sprague de Camp, first published in hardcover by Twayne Publishers. An E-book edition was published as The Tritonian Ring and Other Pasudian [sic] Tales by Gollancz's SF Gateway imprint on September 29, 2011 as part of a general release of de Camp's works in electronic form. The pieces were originally published between 1951 and 1953 in the magazines and anthologies Two Complete Science Adventure Books, Fantasy Fiction, Imagination Stories of Science and Fantasy, and Fantastic Adventures. The title story, the novel The Tritonian Ring has also been published separately.

The book is a collection of de Camp's early Pusadian tales, all of which are set in an antediluvian world patterned after Robert E. Howard's Hyborian Age.

== Contents ==
- The Tritonian Ring
- "The Stronger Spell"
- "The Owl and the Ape"
- "The Eye of Tandyla"

== Critical reception ==
Groff Conklin, reviewing the Twayne edition, described De Camp's work as "in the Conan tradition in every sense of the word, though better written." Galaxy columnist Floyd C. Gale praised de Camp, who "did a remarkable job when he tossed his inhibitions to the wind and outConaned Conan." P. Schuyler Miller recommended the stories for their "pure swashbuckling fun with a touch of bawdiness." The Hartford Courant's R. W. Wallace praised the title piece as "extravagant adventure" marked by "zany dialogue." Boucher and McComas, however, dismissed Tritonian Ring as "one of those endless tales of a prehistoric (or more precisely, non-historic) kingdom of swordplay and bloodshed, which seem to us to bear little relation to science fiction or fantasy."

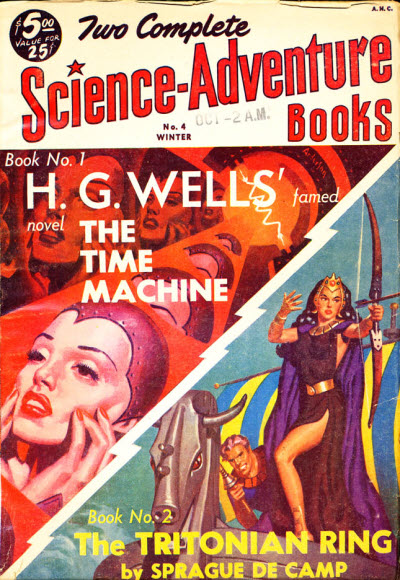
The Tritonian Ring was originally published in Two Complete Science-Adventure Books in 1951

== Sources ==
- Laughlin, Charlotte; Daniel J. H. Levack (1983). De Camp: An L. Sprague de Camp Bibliography. San Francisco: Underwood/Miller. p. 100.
