= An Elephant for Aristotle =

1958 novel by L. Sprague de Camp

- Dust-jacket illustration for first edition
- Author: L. Sprague de Camp
- Cover artist: Alice Smith
- Language: English
- Genre: Historical novel
- Published: 1958 Doubleday
- Publication place: United States
- Media type: Print (Hardback)
- Pages: 360
- Preceded by: The Arrows of Hercules
- Followed by: The Bronze God of Rhodes

An Elephant for Aristotle is a 1958 historical novel by American writer L. Sprague de Camp. It was first published in hardback by Doubleday, and in paperback by Curtis in 1971. The first British edition was published by Dobson in 1966. The book was reissued with a new introduction by Harry Turtledove as a trade paperback and e-book by Phoenix Pick in March 2013. It is the first of de Camp's historical novels in order of writing, and the third chronologically. It has been translated into German.

== Plot summary ==
The novel concerns the adventures of Leon of Atrax, a Thessalian cavalry commander who has been tasked by Alexander the Great to bring an elephant captured from the Indian ruler Porus to Athens as a present for Alexander's old tutor, Aristotle. Leading a motley crew that includes an Indian elephantarch to care for the creature, a Persian warrior, a Syrian sutler and a Greek philosopher, Leon sets out to cross the whole of the ancient known world from the Indus River to Athens.

The journey is long and adventurous, involving frequent skirmishes with bandits, unruly noblemen, Macedonian commanders with ideas of their own about who is in charge, and a runaway Persian noblewoman. It doesn't help that the goal of the whole enterprise is essentially a malicious prank concocted by Alexander on his former teacher: he gives Aristotle the elephant but no funds for its upkeep, while sending the funds (but no elephant) to the savant's arch-rival Xenocrates.

The story is founded on the fact that Aristotle's writings include an apparently eye-witness description of an Indian elephant, though the circumstances under which he might have come into contact with such an animal are unknown.

Cover of first paperback edition

== Reception ==
Contemporary reviews of the novel were favorable. The Chicago Daily Tribune called it "an amazing narrative vehicle for the display of ... a fairly complete composite of the life and times of which the author writes" and praised its "ever-freshly welling vein of humor." The New York Times called it an "engaging new historical novel," and stated that "by hybridizing a Middle-Eastern travelogue with an Alexandrine comedy of manners, the author has produced a specimen only slightly less rare than elephants in Westchester–to wit, a historical novel with a sense of humor." It highlighted de Camp's endowment of each his various characters "with a particular modern accent or dialect" to "differentiate the multitude of nationalities in Alexander's empire," noting that the device "adds to the entertainment." The Washington Post called it an "engaging new novel," and pronounced that "if all books on ancient history were written with the free-flowing grace of An Elephant for Aristotle, many more of us would have an appreciation of the civilizations that came before ours." It stated the author "has given this historical novel a different treatment–one which scrupulously tries to respect historical fact but doesn't take itself too seriously–the change is all for the better."

P. Schuyler Miller in Astounding Science Fiction had a more negative reaction than other reviewers, contrasting de Camp unfavorably with such authors as Edgar Pangborn, "a gifted writer who can make any people warm and real and a part of their times," and Talbot Mundy, whose characters take on "three solid dimensons in a way that only Leon himself comes close to doing" in de Camp's novel—and even de Camp himself, in his "classic" Lest Darkness Fall. Miller admits that "[t]he worried, self-deprecating professional soldier, Leon, does add up to more than a shadow," with "the most believable part of the book com[ing] when he finds himself at home in Thessaly, with his own people." But "[t]his may be a case of art becoming too much of a good thing, for the person Leon is would take exactly this matter-of-fact view of his amazing journey, but a hero can be too self-effacing." And he feels de Camp "does not manage" to make his other characters as convincingly real. He finds its "flaw" in a plot composed "like strings of almost identical beads--separate little episodes, each lovingly constructed, [but] held together only by the continuity of the central characters," leaving it "full of fascinating incident but ... an intellectual adventure rather than something that happens to real people." Miller dismisses the author's use of English dialects to represent those of ancient Greece as "an interesting gimmick, ... logical but somewhat annoying."

== Awards ==
The novel won the Athenaeum of Philadelphia's 1958 Athenaeum Literary Award for fiction.

== Similar book ==
The idea of using the travel of an elephant across different countries as the focus of a historical novel was also taken up by the well-known Portuguese writer José Saramago, in the 2008 novel A Viagem do Elefante (The Voyage of the Elephant), though in a very different literary style from de Camp's and set in a very different time (16th Century Europe) (see ).

== Notes ==
Preceded by The Arrows of Hercules	Historical novels of L. Sprague de Camp; An Elephant for Aristotle	Succeeded by The Bronze God of Rhodes
