= Lands Beyond =

Book by Lyon Sprague de Camp

- Dust-jacket for Lands Beyond
- Author: L. Sprague de Camp and Willy Ley
- Cover artist: Charles Skaggs
- Language: English
- Subject: History
- Publisher: Rinehart & Company
- Publication date: 1952
- Publication place: United States
- Media type: Print (Hardback)
- Pages: 329 pp

Lands Beyond is a study of geographical myths by L. Sprague de Camp and Willy Ley, first published in hardcover by Rinehart in 1952, and reissued by Barnes & Noble in 1993. It has been translated into French, Spanish, Portuguese, and Italian. It was the winner of the 1953 International Fantasy Award for nonfiction.

== Contents ==
- Introduction
- Chapter I. The Land of Longing
- Chapter II. The Long Homecoming
- Chapter III. The Fabulous Feast
- Chapter IV. The Sea of Sindbad
- Chapter V. The Land of Prester John
- Chapter VI. The Mislaid Tribes
- Chapter VII. The Great Dream
- Chapter VIII. The Western Ocean
- Chapter IX. Golden Men and Amazons
- Chapter X. The Shape of the Earth
- Epilogue
- Bibliography
- Index

== Reception ==
New York Times columnist Charles Poore placed Lands Beyond on his annual list of books recommended for Christmas giving. Kirkus Reviews recommended it as "a zestful geographical round-up which combines fact, legend and literature in equally interested parts".

Boucher and McComas praised the book, saying it was "written with scholarly authority, literary grace, and an amusedly tolerant exposition of error, to make one of the season's most enjoyable items." New Worlds reviewer Leslie Flood described it as “fascinating”. Weird Tales commended Lands Beyond to its audience, saying de Camp and Ley "ably treated" their subjects "for reader enjoyment". George O. Smith wrote that it was "a book good for the younger and more impressionable to read, because it reduces to the realm of practicality many of the fabulous mysteries of the past, thus stripping the glamorous Long-Ago of its false superiority".
