= Penn Foster =

American online education organization

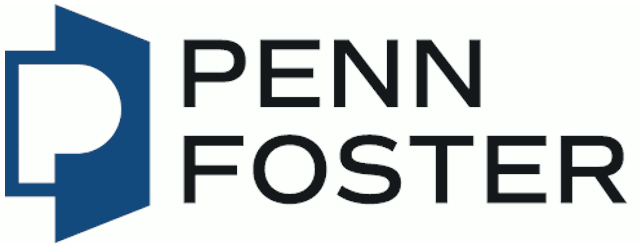
- Established: 1890; 136 years ago
- Founder: Thomas J. Foster
- Founded at: Scranton, Pennsylvania, United States
- Type: Private for-profit educational institution and distance education provider
- CEO: Kermit Cook
- Parent organization: Penn Foster Group
- Website: www.pennfoster.edu
- Formerly called: International Correspondence Schools (ICS)

Penn Foster is a private online education provider based in the United States, offering high school, career training, and college-level programs. The organization originated as the International Correspondence Schools (ICS), founded in 1890 in Scranton, Pennsylvania.

== History ==
=== 19th century ===
The institution was founded by Thomas J. Foster, a Civil War veteran and newspaper editor. He used his newspaper, The Shenandoah Herald, (later renamed The Colliery Engineer), to help prepare mine foremen and inspectors to meet new state certification requirements. In 1888, Foster began publishing instructional materials, which eventually evolved into a formal correspondence education system.

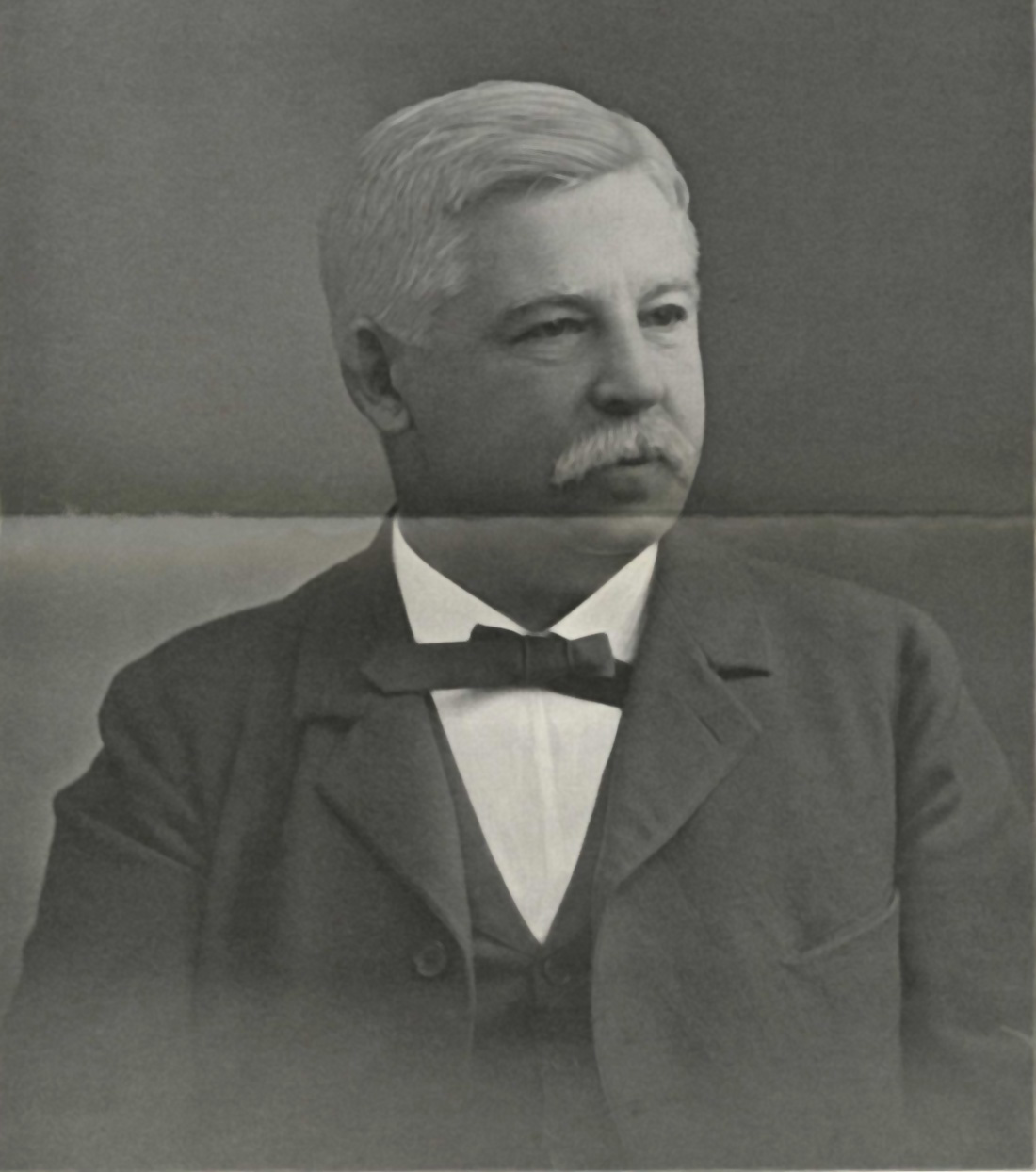
Thomas J. Foster, Founder of Penn Foster, 1905

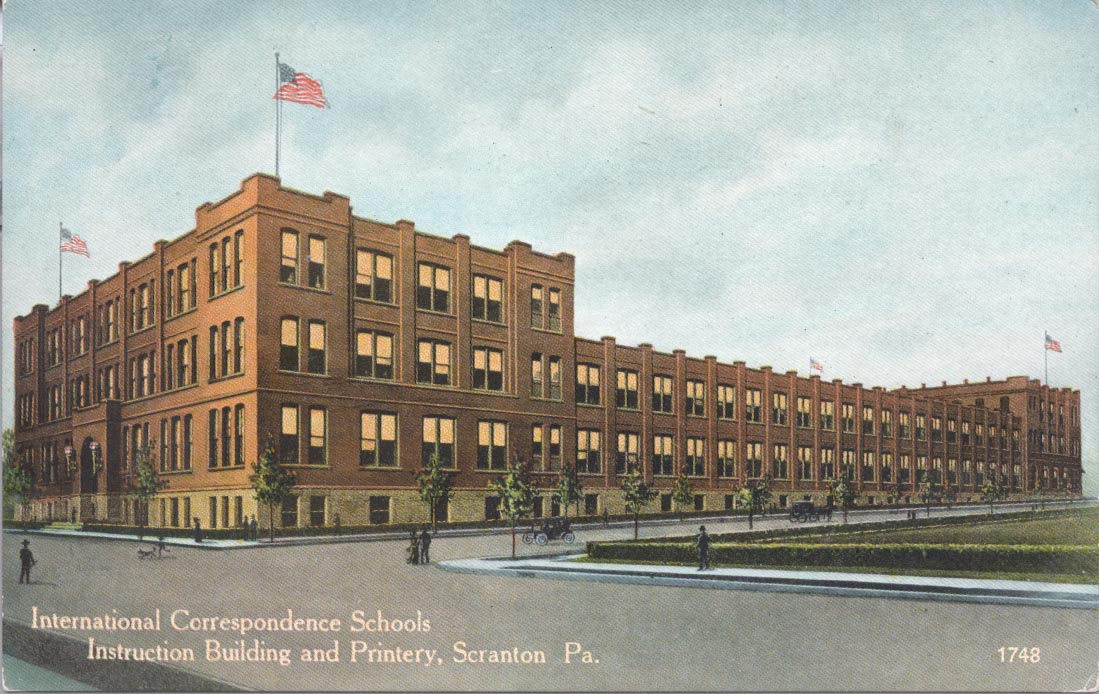
International Correspondence Schools Printery, Scranton, PA, circa 1915

The first official student, Thomas Coates of Peckville, Pennsylvania, enrolled on October 16, 1891, at a cost of $25.00. ICS was formally incorporated in late 1894 under the name International Textbook Company, and by early 1895, the school operated under the name International Correspondence Schools of Scranton, Pennsylvania or ICS for short. ICS sent printed lessons by mail, which students completed and returned for grading, a model that became an early example of distance education in the United States.

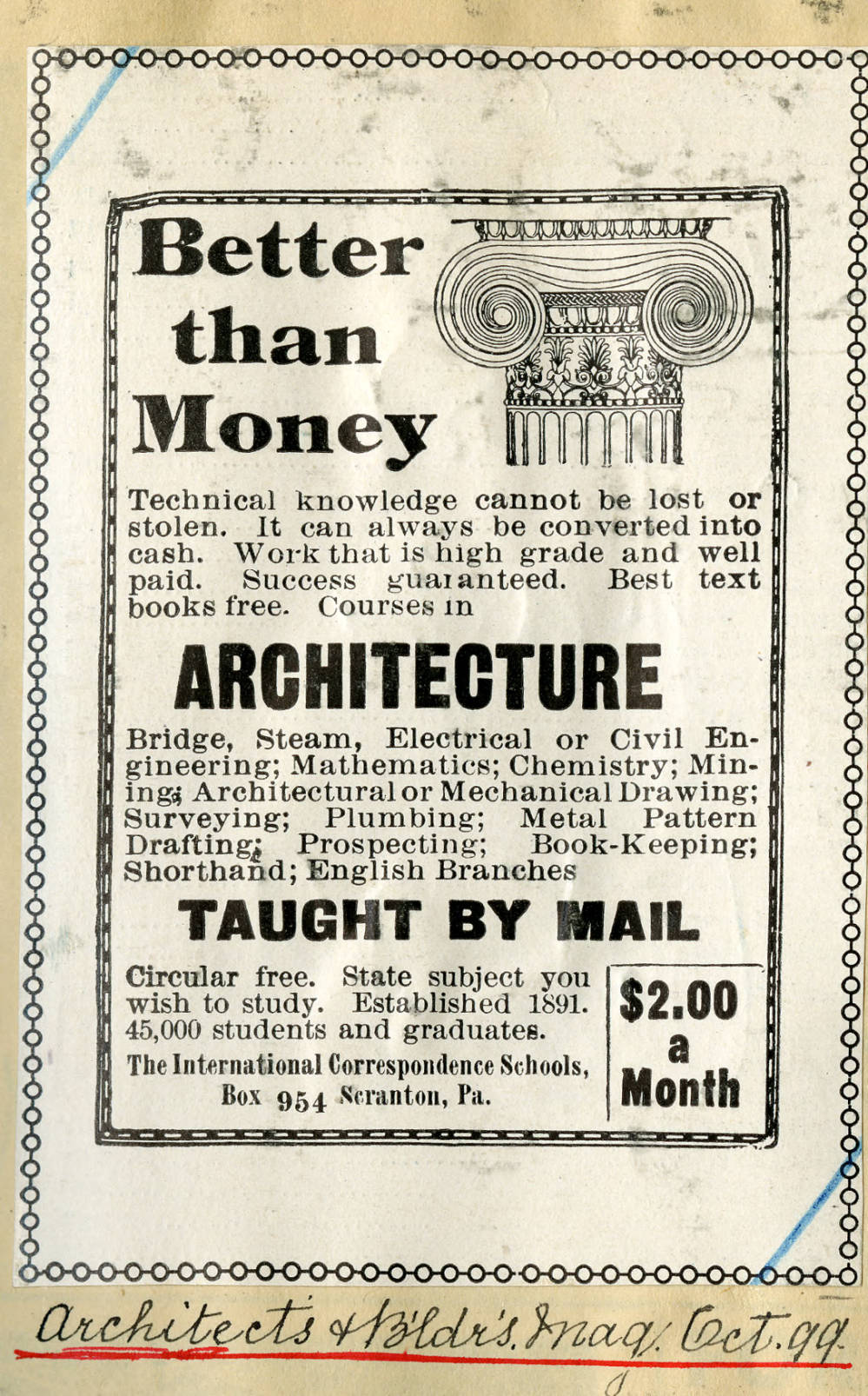
Printed promotional material for architecture courses published by ICS in 1899.

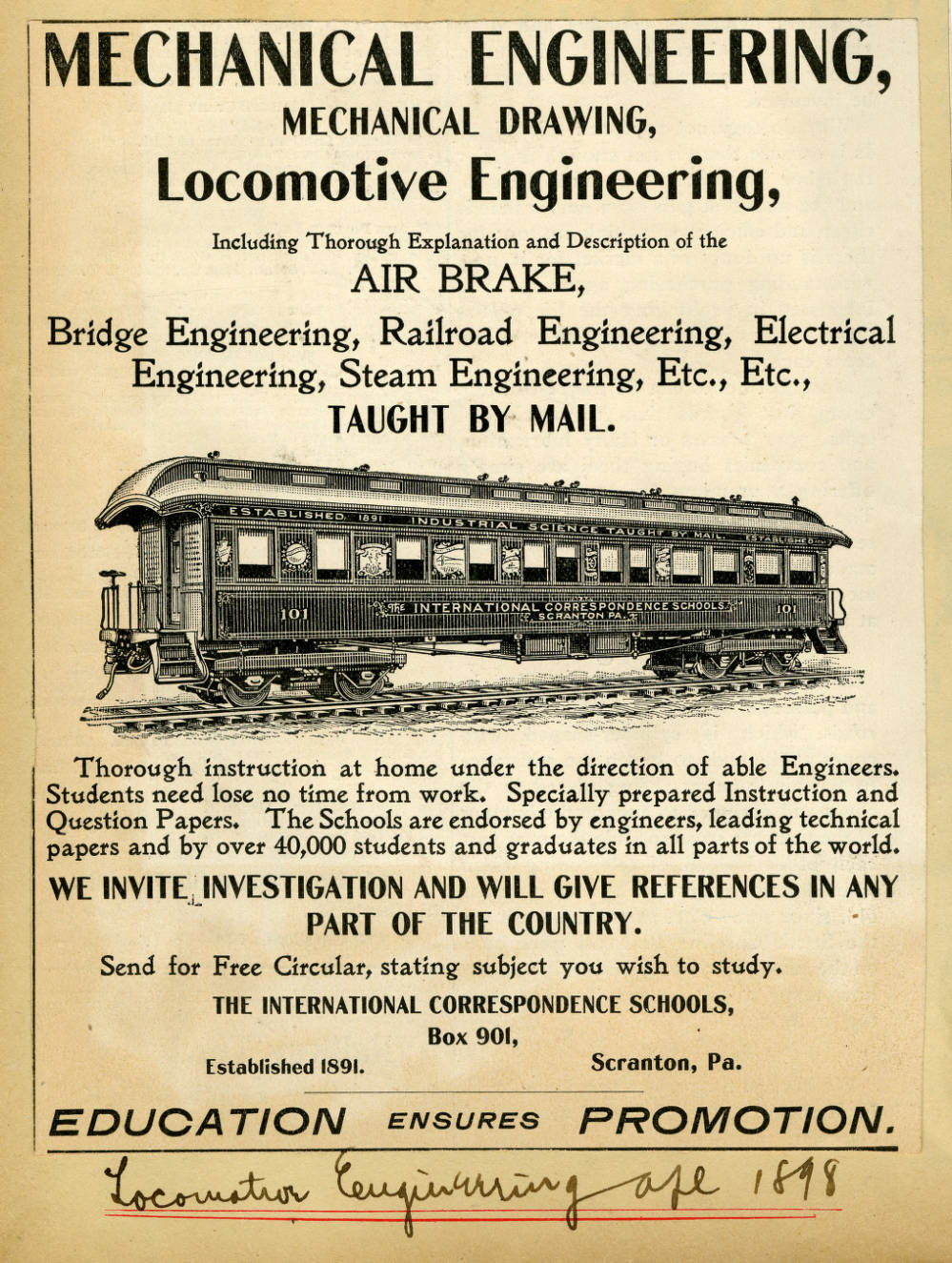
A 1898 promotional publication from the International Correspondence Schools.

=== 20th century ===
ICS experienced significant growth in the early 20th century. The first class had 500 miners, by 1900, enrollment reached 190,000, and by 1910, more than 1 million students had enrolled. The school expanded internationally to the United Kingdom in 1904, where it continues to operate as ICS Learn. During World War II, the U.S. War Department commissioned ICS to develop training materials.

In 1916, ICS founded the Woman's Institute of Domestic Arts and Sciences in Scranton, which provided training in domestic fields such as dressmaking and cooking.

Despite early success, ICS and similar institutions faced declining enrollment by the mid-20th century. Factors contributing to this included the expansion of public high schools, the rise of community colleges, and the availability of federal education benefits through the G.I. Bill.

The ICS parent company, Intext, was acquired by National Education in 1979. In the 1980s and 1990s, ICS gained visibility through direct-to-consumer advertising, including television commercials featuring Sally Struthers, a popular spokesperson at the time. Harcourt General acquired National Education in 1997.

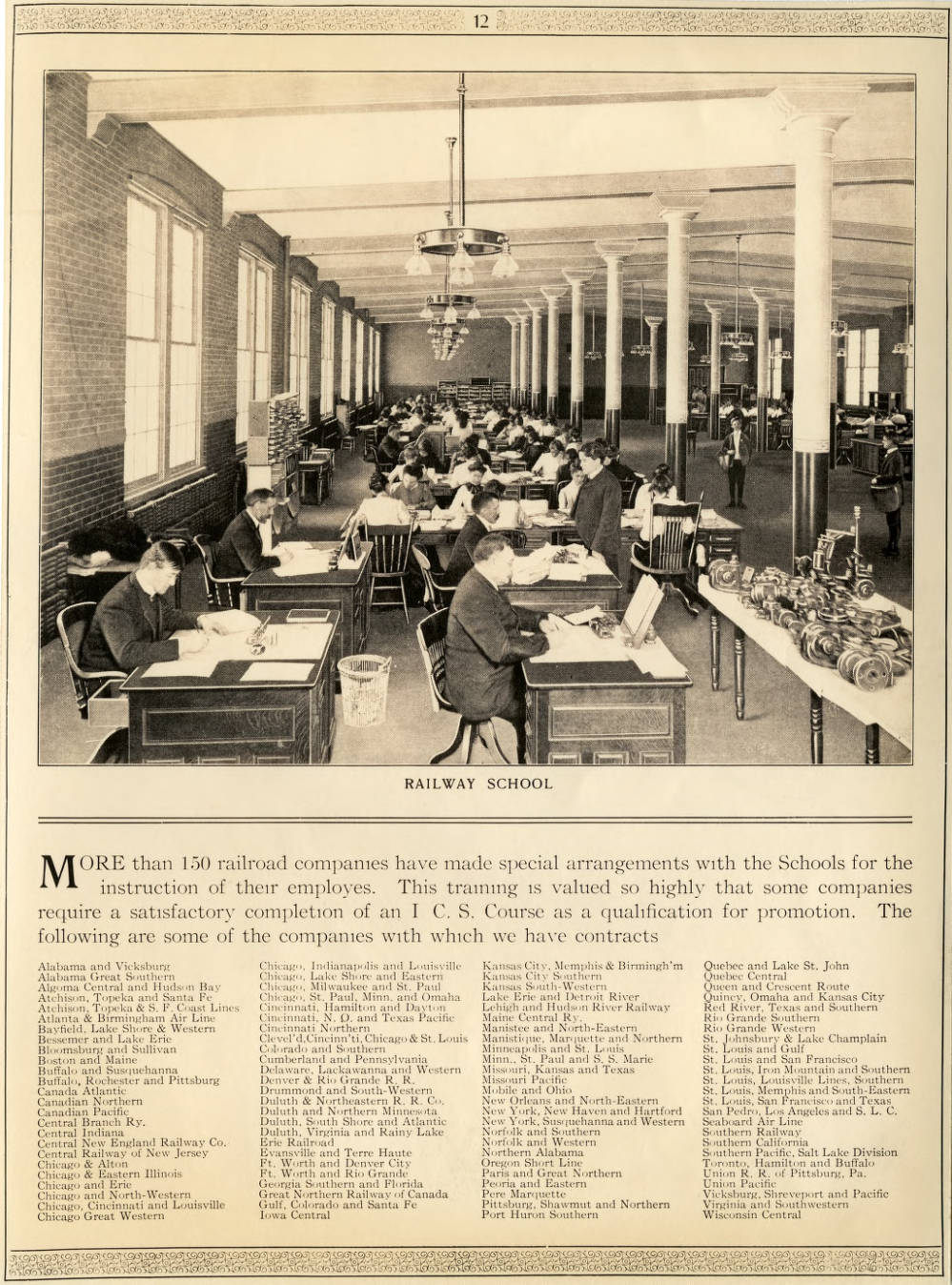
Undated ICS publication highlighting its Railway School and affiliated railroad companies.

=== 21st century ===
Reed Elsevier acquired Harcourt in 2001 and divested its higher education unit to Thomson Corporation. In 2005, ICS was renamed Penn Foster. In 2007, the Wicks Group, a private equity firm, bought the school from Thomson Corporation. In 2009, Penn Foster was resold to test preparation and educational support company, The Princeton Review. In 2012, the Princeton Review brand name and operations were bought for $33 million by Charlesbank Capital Partners, a private-equity firm. The parent company was renamed Education Holdings 1, Inc.

In 2013, Education Holdings 1 filed for bankruptcy; it exited two months later. In 2014 Vistria Group, led by Martin Nesbitt, acquired Penn Foster. In December 2015, Penn Foster acquired a competency-based learning platform built by UniversityNow. In 2018, Bain Capital acquired Penn Foster from Vistria Group.

In 2023, the organization restructured under the name Penn Foster Group, which includes various educational entities such as Penn Foster Career School, Penn Foster College, and Penn Foster High School.

In 2024, Penn Foster closed its Scranton service center, ending its physical presence in the city where it was founded. The closure impacted approximately 135 employees and was part of the organization's transition to remote operations.

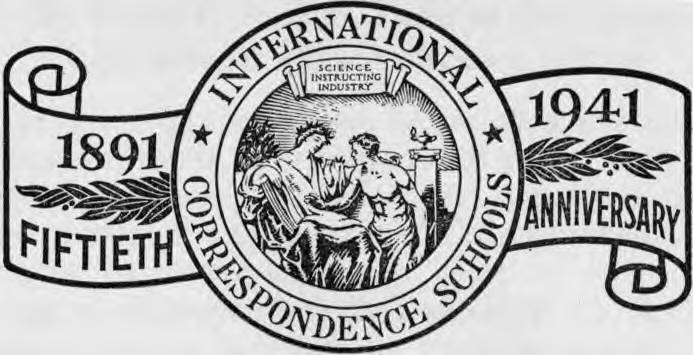
50th anniversary seal of the International Correspondence Schools, 1941.

== Educational divisions ==
=== Penn Foster High School ===
==== Academics ====
Penn Foster High School is an open enrollment program. As an online school, students work with the support of certified teachers. Students complete core subjects and elective courses, with some electives aligned to career areas such as healthcare, information technology, and veterinary assistant.

According to the Pennsylvania Department of Education, Penn Foster High School has 11.5 FTE (full-time equivalent teachers) for about 13,000 students.

==== Partnerships ====
Penn Foster High School partners with Chicago CRED, to provide high school diploma options for young adults. It also provides diploma programs through the U.S. Department of Labor's Job Corps.

==== Student outcomes ====
According to data published by Penn Foster High School in 2025, the school reported a 65% completion rate for students who enrolled between January 1 and December 31, 2020. This rate reflects graduations within 150% of the expected program time and excludes students who canceled within six days, did not start the program, were dismissed, or transferred to another program. A total of 24,767 students in the cohort graduated from the high school program.

=== Penn Foster College ===
==== Academics ====
Penn Foster College offers associate degrees, bachelor's degrees, and certificates. Each program is fully online includes structured curriculum.

=== Penn Foster Career School ===
==== Academics ====
Penn Foster Career School focuses on career-oriented training through diplomas and certificates. Coursework is delivered online in a self-paced format. Many programs at Penn Foster Career School are typically shorter in duration than degree programs.

== Programs and offerings ==
Penn Foster provides asynchronous, self-paced online courses in fields such as veterinary studies, healthcare, skilled trades, and business, across high school, career training, and degree-level programs. As of 2025, the institution reported over 13 million students since its establishment.

== Accreditation ==
As of May 2026, Penn Foster Career School, Penn Foster High School, and Penn Foster College hold a combination of national and regional accreditations.

Penn Foster Career School, Penn Foster High School, and Penn Foster College are nationally accredited by the Distance Education Accrediting Commission (DEAC).

Penn Foster Career School is regionally accredited for non-degree postsecondary programs and Penn Foster High School is regionally accredited for grades 9 through adult, by the Commission on Secondary Schools of the Middle States Association of Colleges and Schools (MSA-CESS). Penn Foster High School is accredited by Cognia. Additionally, the high school is an approved Category III non-public accredited online school by the Tennessee State Board of Education, but is not licensed by the Pennsylvania Department Of Education.

Penn Foster High School is cleared by the NCAA Eligibility Center, allowing its approved courses and diplomas to be used for student-athlete eligibility.

The Veterinary Technician is accredited by the AVMA Committee on Veterinary Technician Education and Activities (CVTEA).

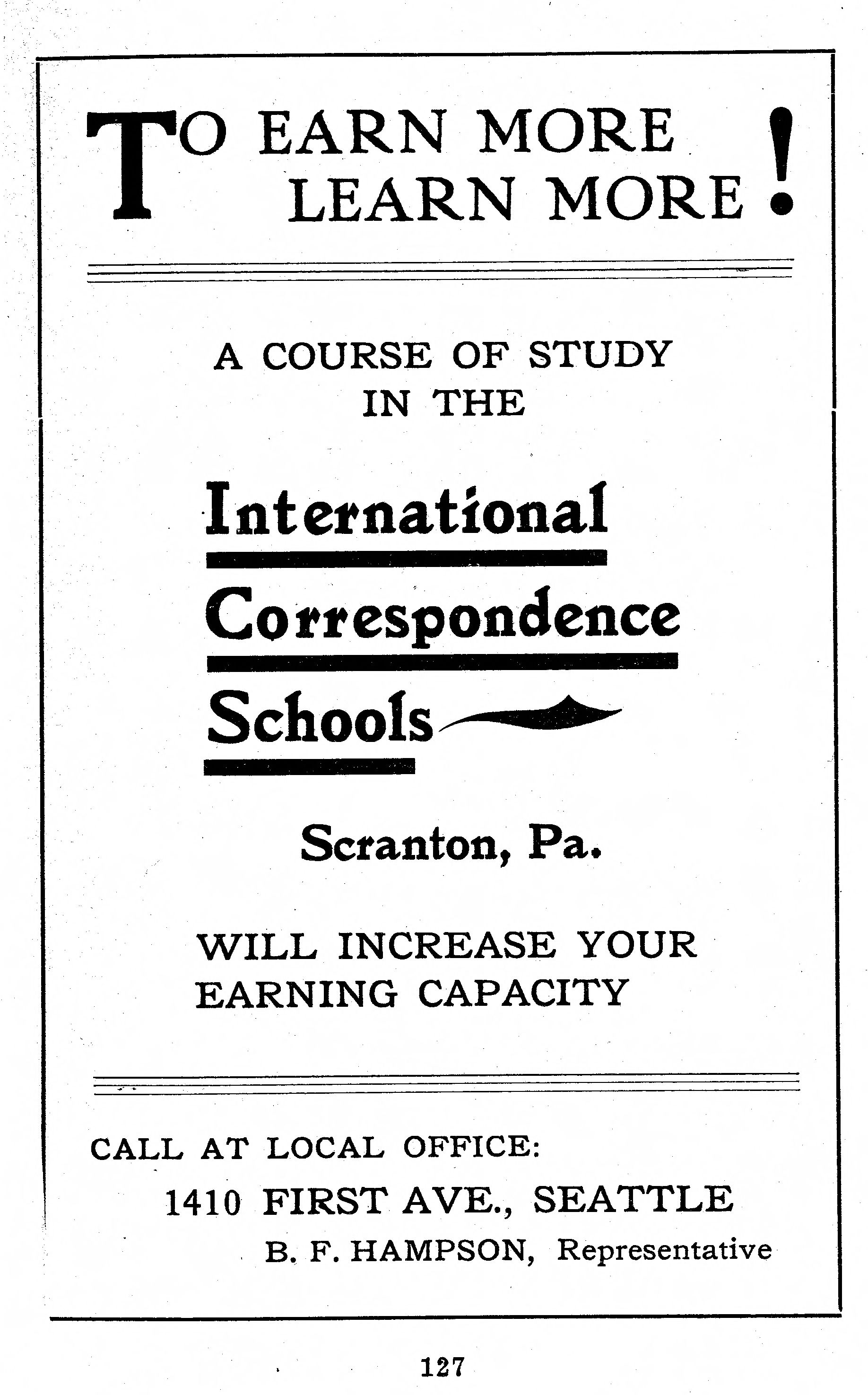
Advertisement for International Correspondence Schools in the 1909 Alaska-Yukon-Pacific Exposition guidebook.

== Reception and controversies ==
Throughout its history, Penn Foster and its predecessor, the International Correspondence Schools (ICS), have received both recognition and criticism. While ICS played a significant role in expanding access to education through distance learning in the early 20th century, historians have noted that its correspondence-based curriculum may not have matched the rigor of traditional educational institutions. Some questioned its effectiveness for subjects requiring hands-on or instructor-led instruction.

In 2013, Education Holdings 1, Inc., the parent company of Penn Foster, filed for Chapter 11 bankruptcy protection in the United States Bankruptcy Court for the District of Delaware. The bankruptcy followed a federal investigation into fraudulent billing practices by The Princeton Review Inc. (the affiliated with Education Holdings 1). Although Penn Foster itself was not implicated, the settlement included the sale of Penn Foster to help fund more than $10 million in penalties.

In 2015, the Oregon Department of Justice and the Oregon Higher Education Coordinating Commission reached a settlement with Penn Foster College following an investigation into its marketing and enrollment practices. The inquiry began after a student complaint and found that Penn Foster College had enrolled Oregon residents without required state authorization and had represented itself as regionally accredited, although it held national rather than regional accreditation. Under the settlement, Penn Foster was required to refund $1,900 in tuition to the complainant, pay $22,000 to cover investigative costs, and donate up to $50,000 to nonprofit or government organizations supporting educational access for disadvantaged Oregonians.

Accreditation remains a topic of public interest concerning Penn Foster. The institution holds national accreditation from the Distance Education Accrediting Commission (DEAC), and some of its programs also hold specialized or regional accreditation. However, credits earned at nationally accredited institutions are not always transferable to regionally accredited colleges and universities, which may limit academic mobility for some students. Some have also expressed concern over the role of private equity and investor influence during Penn Foster's acquisition by The Princeton Review and subsequent restructuring.

== Alumni ==
Notable individuals who have reportedly studied with ICS or Penn Foster include Walter P. Chrysler (1875 –1940), founder of the Chrysler Corporation; Eddie Rickenbacker (1890–1973), World War I flying ace; and Abelardo Rodriguez (1889–1967), President of Mexico from 1932 to 1934. The specific nature of their studies and the impact of training on their careers is not always detailed in public sources.

== See also ==
- ICS Learn – UK for-profit online college
