= Pusadian series =

Fantasy series by L. Sprague de Camp

The Tritonian Ring and Other Pusadian Tales by L. Sprague de Camp, Twayne Publishers, 1953

The Pusadian series is a sequence of fantasy stories by L. Sprague de Camp, begun in the early 1950s and written under the influence of Robert E. Howard's Conan stories. The series, also known as the Poseidonis series, prefigured the numerous sword & sorcery settings of the 1960s and 1970s.

== The setting ==
Just as de Camp attempted to do for the Barsoom novels of Edgar Rice Burroughs with his "Krishna" stories, the Pusadian stories represent both a tribute to Howard's prehistoric "Hyborian Age" and an attempt to "get it right", reconstructing his model's concept logically, without what he regarded as Howard's anthropological and geological absurdities. Unlike Howard, de Camp brought a thorough knowledge of ancient history and geography to his project, along with a wealth of research on prior literary treatments of speculative prehistoric civilizations, as reflected in his definitive study Lost Continents (1954).

In constructing his "Pusadian Age", de Camp took Plato's account of Atlantis and the supposed period of its existence seriously, postulating an early high civilization thousands of years before those of the Egyptians and Sumerians, at the time of the last ice age. At that time, in accordance with actual Ice Age geography, lower sea levels meant that Eurasia and Africa were joined into a single land mass, whose coastline extended far out onto what is today the flooded continental shelf.

Civilization is located in the Euskerian lands, which are dominated by the Tartessian Empire, centered in what is now Spain. To the south is the mountain range of Atlantis, inhabited by savages, beyond which lay the realm of Tartaros, and to the north Aremoria, a land of Celt-like barbarians. The northernmost known land is Thulê, a snowy land, and the southernmost is Blackland, a swamp-filled region. To the west are the islands of the Hesperides, including the island kingdom of Ogugia, beyond which lay the small island continent of Pusad, home to a patchwork of small states, of which the strongest is Lorsk. To the south of these are the Gorgades, a group of three islands inhabited by corsairs. East of Euskeria is the realm of Phaiaxia, a non-Euskerian country subject to Tartesia near the Thrinaxian Sea, and to the southeast Lake Tritonis, home of the warring Tritons and Amazons.

Much of the series' political geography is derived more or less directly from the mythologies of classical Greece and other ancient Mediterranean peoples, elements of which were plausibly portrayed as deriving from the all but forgotten predecessor civilization of the Pusadian age. In de Camp's scheme, the remote successor of the Tartesian empire was the historical Spanish civilization of Tartessos, with (for example) the memory of Euskeria preserved by Euskara (the Basque country) and the Scheria of Homeric legend, that of Atlantis by the Atlas Mountains, and that of Aremoria by the Gaulish peninsula of Armorica (Brittany). In the tales that supposedly came down to Plato, barbaric Atlantis, imperial Euskeria, and the island of Pusad (or Poseidonis, as the name was remembered by the Greeks) had become confused with each other and conflated into one.

The Euskerian civilization was fueled by magic, crawling with wizards and rife with gods made real or potent by the beliefs of their devotees. It was also slowly degenerating as the power of magic dwindled in the face of an early flowering of iron-working, with meteoric iron being the bane of magic. Simultaneously, over the course of centuries, Pusad was slowly sinking into the sea. De Camp wrote his first Pusadian tales under the influence of the scientific theory of geological gradualism which then held sway, which led him to reject the possibility of the island continent disappearing in a sudden cataclysm, as related by Plato. Later scientific discovery of the geological forces of plate tectonics have since precluded the possibility of an island continent ever having existed where he (and Plato) put it, regardless of the rate of destruction, rendering de Camp's gradualism as obsolete as Howard's catastrophism.

== The stories ==
The Pusadian stories consist of the novel The Tritonian Ring, set early in the course both of Pusad's foundering and the discovery of iron and its inimical effect on magic, and seven short stories that take place some generations later. The protagonist of The Tritonian Ring is Prince Vakar of Lorsk, the predominant nation of Pusad, who undertakes a quest to save his land from the anger of the gods that takes him through much of the then-known world. Of the short stories, five feature Gezun, also of Lorsk, kidnapped from his native country by slave raiders to become a roving adventurer. Neither is a hero of the Conan stripe, as de Camp's estimation of heroics is more realistic than Howard's, and includes a healthy dose of skepticism regarding human motivations. Though Gezun's life story unfolds over the course of the tales featuring him in Conan-like fashion, it is no Horatio Alger progression to kingship like Conan's. Rather, it is a perpetual contest of wits against the world as Gezun seeks his fortune, and finds that fortune elusive. Practically speaking, he is a prehistoric con-man, which is essentially de Camp's definition of an adventurer.

The complete Pusadian tales have never been published together. The collection The Tritonian Ring and Other Pusadian Tales (1953) gathers together the title novel and three of the short stories, and the later collection Die Chronik von Poseidonis (1978) joins the same three short stories with two of the others, albeit all in German translation. The Tritonian Ring has also been published by itself on a number of occasions.

== Critical reception ==
Groff Conklin, reviewing the Twayne edition, described De Camp's work as "in the Conan tradition in every sense of the word, though better written."

== Bibliography ==
=== The stories ===
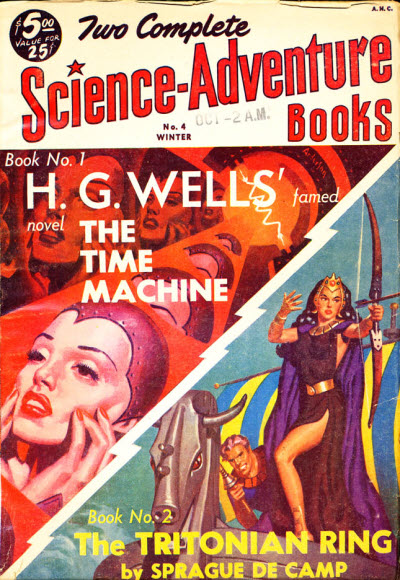
The Tritonian Ring was originally published in Two Complete Science-Adventure Books in 1951

- The Tritonian Ring (1951)
- "The Eye of Tandyla" (1951)
- "The Owl and the Ape" (1951)
- "The Stronger Spell" (1953)
- "The Hungry Hercynian" (1953)
- "Ka the Appalling" (1958)
- "The Rug and the Bull" (1974)
- "The Stone of the Witch Queen" (1977)

=== Collected editions ===
- The Tritonian Ring and Other Pusadian Tales (1953) (includes The Tritonian Ring, "The Stronger Spell", "The Owl and the Ape", and "The Eye of Tandyla")
- Die Chronik von Poseidonis (1978) (includes "The Eye of Tandyla", "The Owl and the Ape", "The Hungry Hercynian", "Ka the Appalling", and "The Stronger Spell")

== Sources ==
- Laughlin, Charlotte; Daniel J. H. Levack (1983). De Camp: An L. Sprague de Camp Bibliography. San Francisco: Underwood/Miller. p. 99.
