= International Textbook Company =

Textbook Publisher

- Industry: Book publisher
- Defunct: 1969
- Headquarters: Scranton, Pennsylvania, U.S.

The International Textbook Company (I.T.C.) was founded in 1895 by publisher Thomas J. Foster in Scranton, Pennsylvania. I.T.C. published instructional papers, booklets, and textbooks for the International Correspondence Schools, a subsidiary department. The textbook company and the school were dependent on each other since their founding.

The International Correspondence School started in 1891 as a question-answer column in the pages of the mining journal Colliery Engineer and Metal Miner, also published by Foster. This column was a response to the in-depth tests required of miners and inspectors by the Pennsylvania Mine Safety Act of 1885.

The I.T.C. merged the Colliery Engineer School of Mines, School of Mines, Correspondence Schools, and the International Correspondence School as the International Correspondence Schools of Scranton, Pennsylvania, under the new International Textbook Company.

Several Scranton correspondence schools had textbooks printed or published by I.T.C. as direct subsidiaries of the school, including the Institute of Business Science and the Woman's Institute of Domestic Arts & Sciences.

Foster's unethical business practices bankrupted the school and the book company. Philanthropic Scranton bankers and businessmen who saw the potential impact this school would have on their workforce and community reorganized it under receivership in 1905. Many men and women who didn't have the means for schooling past grade 8 in the first half of the 20th century can thank them for their vision. I.C.S. and other later schools such as The American School of Correspondence in Chicago, Illinois, provided a way to gain practical knowledge that could better their earning potential without quitting work for 3–4 years.

The International Library of Technology was published by I.T.C. These books were bound volumes of the course materials for the more than 240 courses offered. These books were used and made available in at least 184 colleges, including the U.S. Military Academy at West Point and Cornell University, and at least 649 public libraries.

== Related ==
The International Correspondence Schools of Scranton, Pennsylvania, was a pioneer in post-secondary distance education. It was operated under that name from 1895 until bankruptcy in 1996. I.C.S. is in operation today as the Penn Foster Career School. The American School of Correspondence in Chicago, Illinois, is still in operation as a private secondary school.
