= L. Sprague de Camp =

American fiction writer (1907–2000)

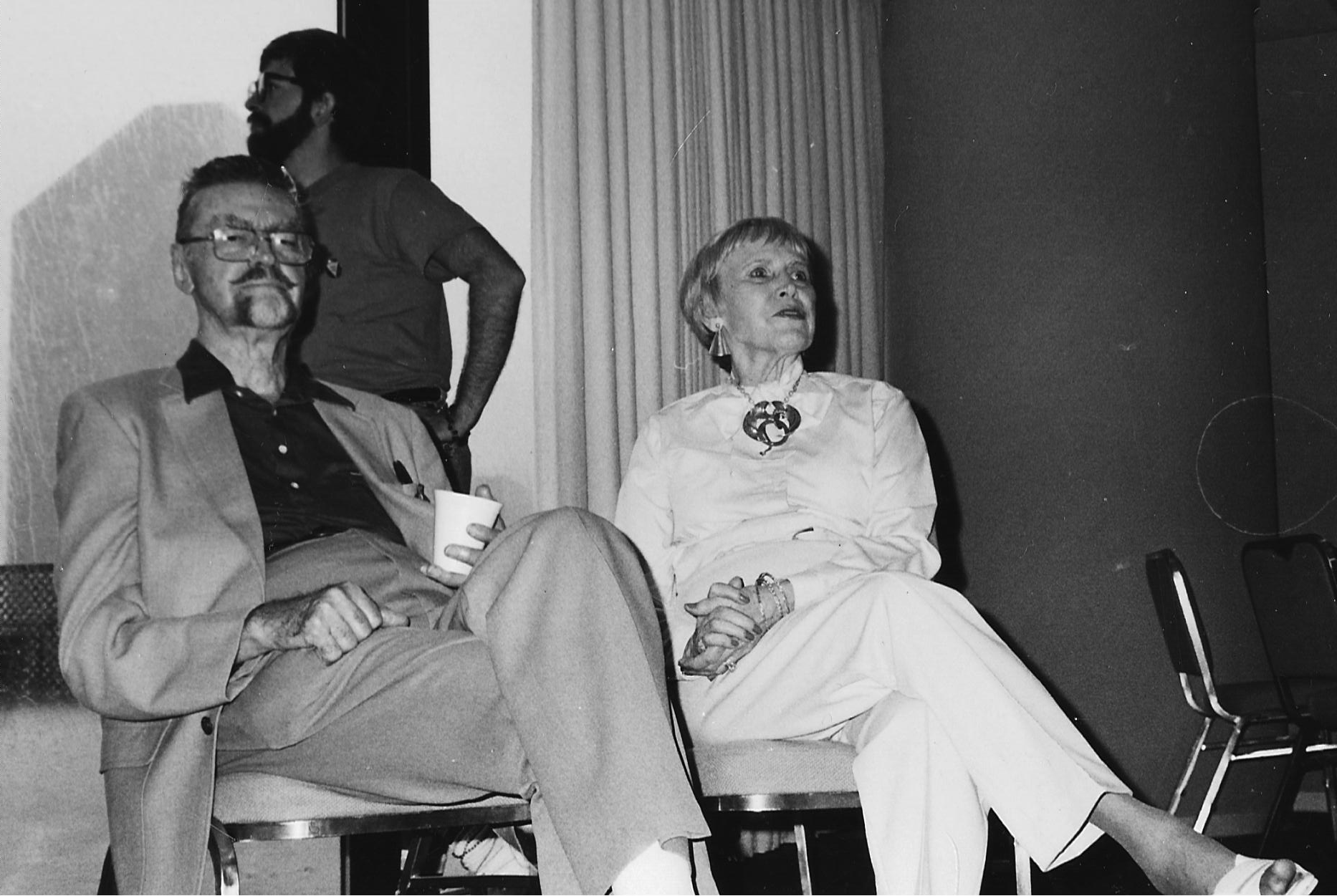
- L. Sprague and Catherine Crook de Camp at Nolacon II in 1988
- Born: Lyon Sprague de Camp; November 27, 1907; New York City, New York, U.S.
- Died: November 6, 2000 (aged 92); Plano, Texas, U.S.
- Occupations: Novelist; short story author; essayist; historian
- Writing career
- Pen name: Lyman R. Lyon (one story); J. Wellington Wells
- Period: 1937–1996
- Genres: Science fiction, fantasy, alternate history, historical fiction, history

Lyon Sprague de Camp (/ˌspreɪɡdəˈkæmp/; November 27, 1907 – November 6, 2000) was an American author of science fiction, fantasy and non-fiction literature. In a career spanning 60 years, he wrote over 100 books, including biographies of other fantasy authors. He was a major figure in science fiction in the 1930s and 1940s.

== Biography ==
De Camp was born in New York City, one of three sons of Lyon de Camp (a businessman in real-estate and lumber), and of Emma Beatrice Sprague. His maternal grandfather was the accountant, banker, pioneering Volapükist and Civil War veteran Charles Ezra Sprague. De Camp once noted that he rarely used pen-names, "partly because my own true name sounds more like a pseudonym than most pseudonyms do".

De Camp began his education at the Trinity School in New York, then spent ten years attending the Snyder School in North Carolina, a military-style institution. His stay at the Snyder School represented an attempt by his parents, who were heavy-handed disciplinarians, to cure him of intellectual arrogance and of lack of discipline. He was awkward and thin, an ineffective fighter, and suffered from bullying by his classmates. His experiences at the school taught him to develop a detached, analytical style considered cold by all but his closest friends, though he could, like his father, be disarming and funny in social situations. He would later recall these challenging childhood experiences in the semi-autobiographical story Judgment Day (1955).

An aeronautical engineer by education, de Camp undertook undergraduate studies at the California Institute of Technology (where his roommate was at one point noted rocket-fuel scientist John Drury Clark), and earned his Bachelor of Science degree from Caltech in aeronautical engineering 1930. He earned his Master of Science degree in engineering from the Stevens Institute of Technology in 1933. De Camp was also a surveyor and an expert in patents.

In his first job he worked for the Inventors Foundation, Inc. in Hoboken, New Jersey, which was taken over by The International Correspondence Schools. De Camp transferred to the Scranton, Pennsylvania division. He was principal of the School of Inventing and Patenting when he resigned in 1937. His first book Inventions and Their Management resulted, published in July 1937.

On August 12, 1939, de Camp married Catherine Crook, with whom he collaborated on science fiction and nonfiction beginning in the 1960s. They had two children.

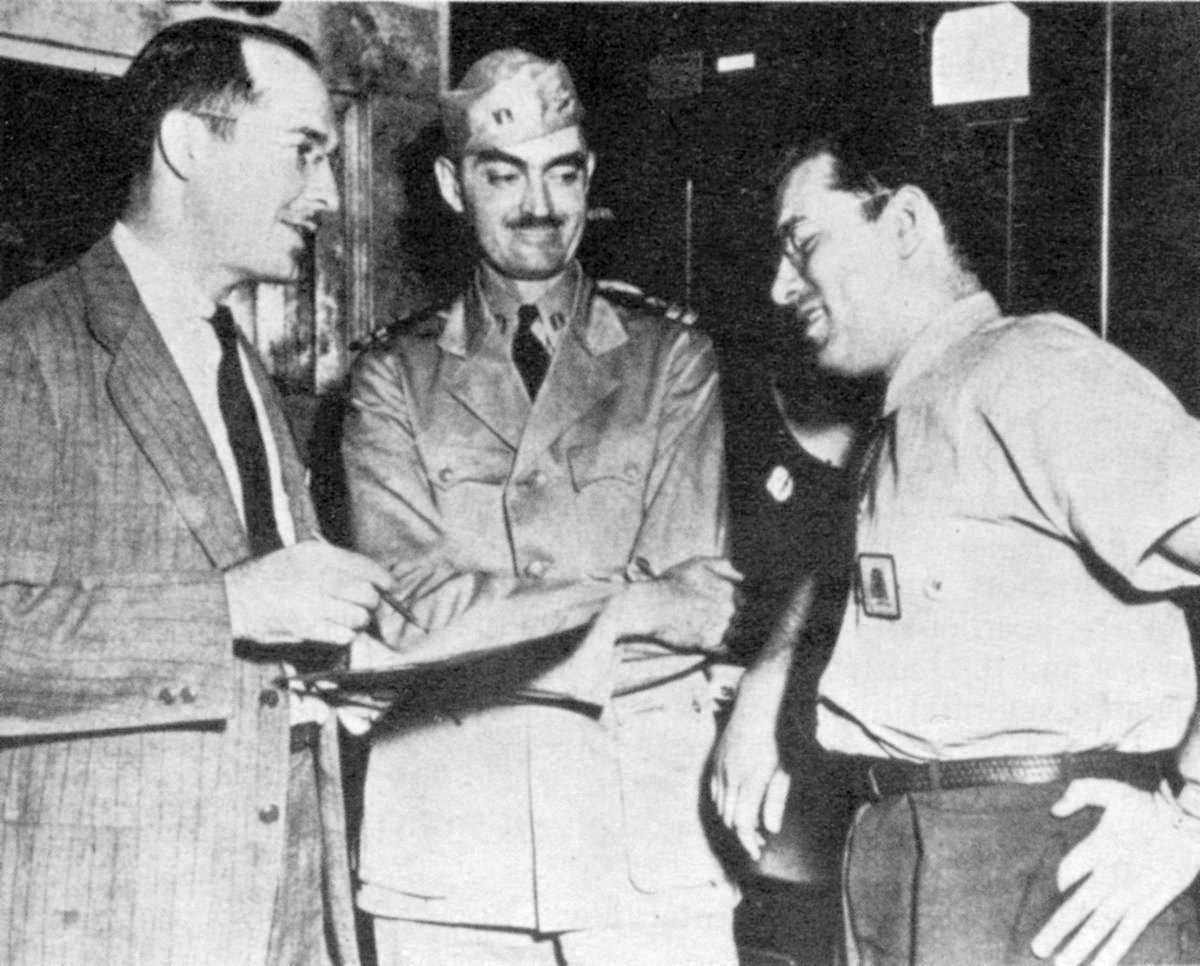
De Camp (center) with Robert A. Heinlein and Isaac Asimov in 1944

During World War II, de Camp served as a researcher at the Philadelphia Naval Yard along with his fellow-writers Isaac Asimov and Robert A. Heinlein. De Camp eventually rose to the rank of lieutenant commander in the U.S. Navy as a reserve officer. From 1942 to 1989, the de Camps generally lived near Philadelphia; for decades their home was in Villanova, Pennsylvania.

De Camp was a member of the all-male literary and dining club in New York City, the "Trap Door Spiders", which served as the basis of Asimov's fictional group of mystery-solvers the "Black Widowers". De Camp himself was the model for the character named "Geoffrey Avalon".

De Camp was a founding member of the Swordsmen and Sorcerers' Guild of America (SAGA), a loosely-knit group of heroic fantasy writers founded during the 1960s and led by Lin Carter, with entry by credentials as a fantasy writer alone.

The de Camps moved to Plano, Texas, in 1989, and Sprague de Camp died there on November 6, 2000 (seven months after his wife, on what would have been her birthday), at age 92. His ashes were inurned, together with hers, in the Arlington National Cemetery in Virginia.

De Camp's personal library of about 1,200 books was acquired for auction by Half Price Books in 2005. The collection included books inscribed by fellow writers, such as Isaac Asimov and Carl Sagan, as well as by de Camp himself.

== Coinage of "extraterrestrial" and "E.T." ==
"Extraterrestrial", a coinage from "extra" + "terrestrial", meaning from beyond earth, is attested as an adjective as early as 1868, according to the Oxford English Dictionary. Its first use in connection with life beyond earth was likely by H. G. Wells, in his 1898 novel The War of the Worlds. L. Sprague de Camp is credited with its first usage as a noun with the meaning of "alien life" and with coining the abbreviation "E.T." in the first part of his two-part article "Design for Life", published in the May 1939 issue of Astounding Science Fiction.

== Hypothesis regarding sea serpent sightings ==
De Camp made a suggestion in 1968 that fossil discoveries had influenced modern reports of sea monster sightings. The suggestion was made in his article "Dinosaurs in Today's World" in The Magazine of Fantasy & Science Fiction v. 34, no. 3, March 1968, later reprinted in his nonfiction collection The Fringe of the Unknown, Buffalo, New York: Prometheus, 1983. In 2019 de Camp's theory was scientifically tested by C. G. M. Paxton and D. Naish, who concluded that trends in the data of reported sightings appear to support his hypothesis.

== Body of work ==
De Camp was a materialist who wrote works examining society, history, technology and myth. He published numerous short stories, novels, non-fiction works and poems during his career.

A common theme in many of his works is a corrective impulse regarding similar previous works by other authors. De Camp was frequently disturbed by what he regarded as logical lapses and absurdities in others' writings. Some, like Asimov, felt de Camp's conscientiousness about facts limited the scope of his stories: de Camp was reluctant to use technological or scientific concepts (e.g., hyperspace or faster-than-light travel) if he regarded them as impossible. Thus, his response to Mark Twain's A Connecticut Yankee in King Arthur's Court was to write a similar time travel novel (Lest Darkness Fall) in which the method of time travel was rationalized and the hero's technical expertise was constrained by the technological limitations of the age.

In like fashion, he reimagined space opera and planetary romance in his "Viagens Interplanetarias" series, and the prehistoric precursor civilizations characteristic of much heroic fantasy in his Pusadian series. When he was not debunking literary conventions he was often explaining them. For example, in the Harold Shea stories co-written with his longtime friend Fletcher Pratt, the magical premises of some bodies of myths and legends were accepted but examined and elucidated in terms of their own systems of inherent logic. The civilizations in The Compleat Enchanter, for example, are built upon a cultural and technological reality based on scientific formulas. Characters may be transported to these different worlds, but the magic contained within those worlds is only feasible to the extent that it coincides with the technology of the day (e.g., the combustion engine). De Camp's explanatory tendency also carried over into his non-fictional writings, including advice to science fiction writers on handling the different states of languages in future worlds.

=== Science fiction ===
De Camp's science fiction is marked by his interests in linguistics, ancient history, and the history and philosophy of science. His first published story was "The Isolinguals", in the September 1937 issue of Astounding Science Fiction—the last issue edited by F. Orlin Tremaine, prior to the long tenure of John W. Campbell. Most of his early science fiction stories were unrelated to each other, the exceptions being his "Johnny Black" tales about a black bear uplifted to human-level intelligence, and his "Drinkwhiskey Institute" stories, a series of tall tales involving time travel. Campbell's fantasy magazine, Unknown, was suited to de Camp's idiosyncratic imagination, logic, and sense of humor. He contributed ten novels (five as collaborations), much of it characterized by humor and dry wit. De Camp eschewed the intention of being a satirist, insisting, instead, that the stories he wrote were meant less for instruction or improvement, as satire requires, and more for the amusement of his readers.

De Camp's treatment of time travel and alternate history in stories such as Lest Darkness Fall (1939), "The Wheels of If" (1940), "A Gun for Dinosaur" (1956), "Aristotle and the Gun" (1958), and The Glory That Was (1960) challenged the popular notion of his time that history consisted of an arbitrary series of accidents. Instead, de Camp, through background knowledge and logical thought, systematically demonstrated how technological advances could determine the pattern of an eventful history. Lest Darkness Fall, "The Wheels of If" and "Aristotle and the Gun" have been recognized as seminal works in the field of alternate history.

His most extended work was his "Viagens Interplanetarias" series, set in a future where Brazil is the dominant power, particularly a sub-series of sword and planet novels set on the planet Krishna, beginning with The Queen of Zamba. His most influential Viagens novel was the non-Krishna work Rogue Queen, a tale of a hive society undermined by interstellar contact, which was one of the earliest science fiction novels to deal with sexual themes.

=== Fantasy ===
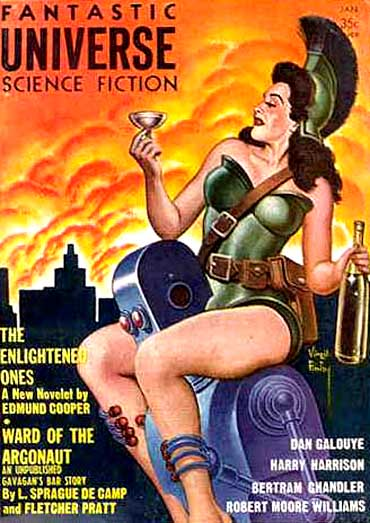
A de Camp-Pratt "Gavagan's Bar" story was cover-featured on the January 1959 issue of Fantastic Universe

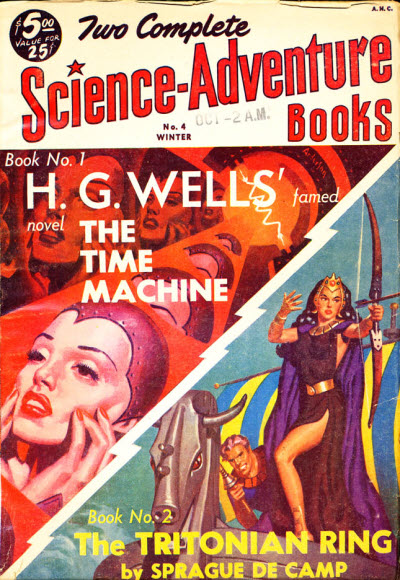
de Camp's heroic fantasy novel The Tritonian Ring was cover-featured on Two Complete Science-Adventure Books in 1951.

De Camp was best known for his light fantasy, particularly two series written in collaboration with Pratt, the Harold Shea stories (from 1940) and Gavagan's Bar (from 1950). Floyd C. Gale in 1961 said that they "were far and away the finest team of fantasy collaborators". De Camp and Pratt also wrote some stand-alone novels similar in tone to the Harold Shea stories, including Land of Unreason (1942). De Camp wrote a few more of this genre on his own.

He was also known for his sword and sorcery, a fantasy genre revived partly by his editorial work on and continuation of Robert E. Howard's Conan cycle. He also edited a series of fantasy anthologies credited with helping to spark the renaissance of heroic fantasy in the late 1960s.

De Camp also created three sword and sorcery sequences. The Pusadian series (from 1951), composed of the novel The Tritonian Ring and several short stories, is set in an antediluvian era similar to Howard's.

The larger Novarian series (from 1968) includes the Reluctant King trilogy, beginning with The Goblin Tower, continuing in The Clocks of Iraz, and concluding with The Unbeheaded King. The trilogy features the adventurer Jorian, ex-king of Xylar. Jorian's world is an alternate reality to which our own serves as an afterlife. Other novels in the sequence include The Fallible Fiend, a satire told from the point of view of a demon, and The Honorable Barbarian, a follow-up to the trilogy featuring Jorian's brother as the hero.

The Incorporated Knight series comprises some 1970s short stories by de Camp and two novels written in collaboration with Catherine Crook de Camp, The Incorporated Knight (1988) and The Pixilated Peeress (1991). The early short stories were incorporated into the first of these. The sequence is set in the medieval era of another alternate world sharing the geography of our own, but in which a Neapolitan empire filled the role of Rome and no universal religion like Christianity ever arose, leaving its nations split among competing pagan sects. The setting is borrowed in part from Mandeville's Travels.

=== Historical fiction ===
De Camp also wrote historical fiction set in the era of classical antiquity from the height of the First Persian Empire to the waning of the Hellenistic period. Five novels published by Doubleday from 1958 to 1969 form a loosely connected series based on their common setting and occasional cross references. They were also linked by a common focus on the advancement of scientific knowledge, de Camp's chosen protagonists being explorers, artisans, engineers, innovators and practical philosophers rather than famous names from antiquity, who are relegated to secondary roles. The best known of his historical novels is The Dragon of the Ishtar Gate (1961).

=== Nonfiction ===
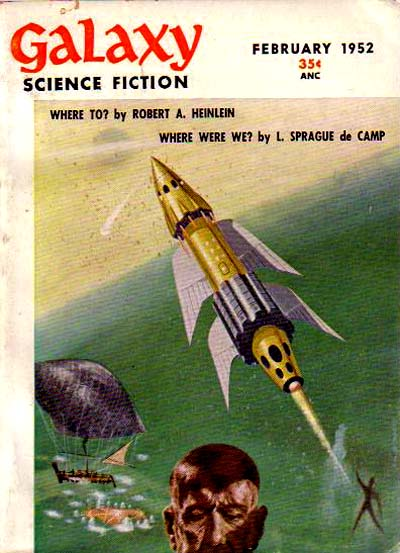
In 1952, Richard M. Powers provided a Galaxy Science Fiction cover highlighting essays by de Camp and by Robert A. Heinlein.

De Camp's first book was Inventions and Their Management, co-written with Alf K. Berle and published by International Textbook Company in 1937: a 733-page book with a three-page list of law cases cited.

He enjoyed debunking doubtful history and pseudoscientific claims about the supernatural. He conducted extensive research for what was to be a book on magic, witchcraft and occultism, though only the first chapter, "The Unwritten Classics" (March 1947), was published in the Saturday Review of Literature. By May 1976, concerned with what Paul Kurtz described as "an enormous increase in public interest in psychic phenomena, the occult and pseudoscience," de Camp joined the newly formed Committee for the Scientific Investigation of Claims of the Paranormal along with astronomers George Abell, Bart Bok, and Carl Sagan; philosophers Brand Blanshard, Antony Flew, Sidney Hook, and Ernest Nagel; authors Isaac Asimov, Daniel Cohen, Charles Fair, Martin Gardner, and Phillip J. Klass; psychologists Ray Hyman and B.F Skinner; and magician James Randi. Despite being a long-time writer of fantasy, de Camp did not believe in ghosts in the supernatural sense. His ghosts dwelt only in his mind as memories of his parents. His mother, he wrote in a New York Times Magazine article, died of an overdose of faith healing. When considering claims of UFO sightings, astrology, and other subjects considered moot by the scientific community, de Camp would address the circular logic expressed by enthusiasts by insisting on first-hand, unbiased, measurable data to back up the claims. "In the history of cultism," de Camp said in a Science News interview, "one is always experiencing a feeling of deja vu."

He explained how ancient civilizations produced structures and architecture that many considered to be impossible for them, such as the Pyramids of Ancient Egypt. Works in this area include Lost Continents, Citadels of Mystery, and The Ancient Engineers.

Some others of his many and wide-ranging nonfiction works were The Great Monkey Trial (about the Scopes Trial), The Ragged Edge of Science, Energy and Power, The Heroic Age of American Invention, The Day of the Dinosaur (which argued, among other things, that evolution took hold after Darwin because of the Victorian interest spurred by recently popularized dinosaur remains, corresponding to legends of dragons), Great Cities of the Ancient World and The Evolution of Naval Weapons (a United States government textbook).

Published in the July 1938 issue of Astounding Science Fiction, "Language for Time Travelers" won de Camp the first non-fiction readership monthly honor awarded in the magazine for his exploration of the communication difficulties for time travelers as pronunciation and semantics shift over time.

De Camp's pioneering biographies of fantasy writers were many short articles and full-length studies of Robert E. Howard and H. P. Lovecraft, the first major independent biographies of both writers. Matthew Hartman, in a review of de Camp's Lovecraft: A Biography, stated that de Camp "does not defend his subject; he criticizes where criticism is due, and he explains in historical and sociological context, rather than attempting to excuse." De Camp's "warts and all" approach to his subjects has been branded by some fans as unflattering and unbalanced. For instance, Mark Finn, author of Blood & Thunder: The Life & Art of Robert E. Howard, contends that de Camp deliberately framed his questions in regard to Howard to elicit answers matching his Freudian theories about him.

De Camp also wrote nonfiction radio scripts for Voice of America.

De Camp wrote a number of lesser-known but nonetheless significant works that explored such topics as racism, which he wrote could be more accurately described as ethnocentrism, noting that no scholar comparing the merits of various ethnicities has ever sought to prove that his own ethnicity was inferior to others. Isaac Asimov recalled de Camp finding the tendency of authors to portray human characters in outer-space science fiction as superior to aliens analogous to northern Europeans imagining they had some inherent superiority over other races.

== Awards and honors ==
De Camp and Willy Ley won the 1953 International Fantasy Award for nonfiction recognizing their study of geographical myths, Lands Beyond (Rinehart, 1952). De Camp was a guest of honor at the 1966 World Science Fiction Convention, and was named the third Gandalf Grand Master of Fantasy, after Tolkien and Fritz Leiber, at the 1976 convention. The Science Fiction Writers of America made him its fourth SFWA Grand Master in 1979 and he won the World Fantasy Award for Life Achievement in 1984, a Special Achievement Sidewise Award for Alternate History in 1996, citing "seminal works in the field," and the Hugo Award for Nonfiction in 1997 for his autobiography, Time and Chance.

At a meeting of the executive council of the Committee for Skeptical Inquiry (CSI) in Denver, Colorado, in April 2011, de Camp was selected for inclusion in CSI's Pantheon of Skeptics. The Pantheon of Skeptics was created by CSI to remember the legacy of deceased fellows of CSI and their contributions to the cause of scientific skepticism. CSI was previously known as the Committee for the Scientific Investigation of Claims of the Paranormal (CSICOP).

== In popular culture ==
L. Sprague de Camp has been depicted in fictional works by a number of other authors. Randall Garrett conflated him with J. R. R. Tolkien's Gandalf in the character of the magician "Sir Lyon Gandolphus Gray" in his Lord Darcy series. He was the model for the "Geoffrey Avalon" character in Isaac Asimov's fictional group of mystery solvers, the "Black Widowers", and the unnamed court magician in Lawrence Watt-Evans' "Return to Xanadu" (The Enchanter Completed: A Tribute Anthology for L. Sprague de Camp, 2005).

He also appears without fictional disguise in the short stories "Green Fire" by Eileen Gunn, Andy Duncan, Pat Murphy, and Michael Swanwick (Asimov's Science Fiction, April 2000) and "Father Figures" by Susan Shwartz (The Enchanter Completed: A Tribute Anthology for L. Sprague de Camp, 2005), and in the novels In the Courts of the Crimson Kings (2008) by S. M. Stirling and The Astounding, the Amazing, and the Unknown (2011) by Paul Malmont.

A semi-fictionalized version of de Camp appears in the third episode of the 2017 TV series Manhunt: Unabomber, as one of several academics and authors consulted by the FBI on the basis of the citation of their work in the Unabomber Manifesto. In the scene depicting this meeting, de Camp's name appears on a placard as "L. Sprague de Camp, S.A.G.A. Author, The Ancient Engineers." De Camp's name does not specifically appear in the episode credits, which identify the roles of actors in the scene as composite characters. The Ancient Engineers is cited in endnote 18 of the manifesto.

== Selected works ==
This selection is limited to books.

=== Science fiction ===
- Lest Darkness Fall (1939) – an early alternate history novel that helped define the genre and remains in print after more than 70 years.
- The Wheels of If and Other Science Fiction (1948) – early collection of de Camp's short fiction, including "The Wheels of If"
- Genus Homo (1950) (with P. Schuyler Miller) – first science fiction novel de Camp had a hand in, possibly the earliest work of fiction dealing with the "Planet of the Apes" theme
- The Hand of Zei (1950) – the best of the early Krishna novels
- Rogue Queen (1951) – one of the earliest science fiction novels to deal with sexual themes
- The Continent Makers and Other Tales of the Viagens (1953) – collection of most of the shorter works in the Viagens Interplanetarias series
- The Virgin of Zesh (1953) – Krishna novel noted for the early use (for science fiction) of a strong female protagonist and a possible influence on Daniel Keyes's Flowers for Algernon
- The Glory That Was (1960) – a tour de force incorporating most of de Camp's major interests into one work
- A Gun for Dinosaur and Other Imaginative Tales (1963) – collection of some of the best of de Camp's early fiction, including "A Gun for Dinosaur" and "Aristotle and the Gun"
- The Best of L. Sprague de Camp (1978) – a mid-career review collecting de Camp's best short works

=== Fantasy ===
- The Incomplete Enchanter (1941) (with Fletcher Pratt) – first of the de Camp/Pratt collaborations, including the earliest Harold Shea stories
- Land of Unreason (1942) (with Fletcher Pratt) – best of the non-series de Camp/Pratt collaborations
- The Undesired Princess (1951) – earliest of de Camp's major fantasies not written in collaboration with Pratt; set in an Aristotelian universe
- Tales from Gavagan's Bar (1953, exp. 1978) (with Fletcher Pratt) – collected edition of de Camp and Pratt's second major fantasy series
- The Tritonian Ring and Other Pusadian Tales (1953) – collection of the earlier works in the Pusadian series, including The Tritonian Ring
- Tales of Conan (1955) (with Robert E. Howard) – collection containing the first of de Camp's "posthumous collaborations" with Howard, marking the beginning of his successful promotion of Howard's "Conan the Barbarian" character
- Conan the Adventurer (1966) (with Robert E. Howard) – collection inaugurating the paperback Conan series, which ensured the success of the character and defined it for a generation
- The Goblin Tower (1968) – first of the Novarian series
- The Fallible Fiend (1973) – offbeat entry in the Novarian series presenting a satirical look at humanity through the eyes of a demon

=== Historical fiction ===
In chronological order:

- The Dragon of the Ishtar Gate (1961)
- The Arrows of Hercules (1965)
- An Elephant for Aristotle (1958)
- The Bronze God of Rhodes (1960)
- The Golden Wind (1969)

=== Anthologies ===
- Swords and Sorcery (1963) – pioneering sword and sorcery anthology, the first ever published
- The Spell of Seven (1965) – the second of de Camp's four sword and sorcery anthologies (followed by the volumes below)
- The Fantastic Swordsmen (1967)
- Warlocks and Warriors (1970)

=== Nonfiction ===
- Inventions and Their Management (1937; vt. Inventions, Patents, and Their Management (1959)) (with Alf K. Berle) – de Camp's first work of nonfiction
- Lands Beyond (1952) (with Willy Ley) – a comprehensive survey of geographical myths
- Science-Fiction Handbook (1953 (revised 1975, with Catherine Crook de Camp)) – an influential early writers' guide
- Lost Continents: the Atlantis Theme in History, Science, and Literature (1954; revised 1970)
- The Ancient Engineers (1963) – an exhaustive account of practical science through the ages prior to the modern era
- Ancient Ruins and Archaeology (1964) - popular discussions of a dozen particularly "mystical" archeological sites around the world (British edition retitled as Citadels of Mystery (1965))
- The Great Monkey Trial (1968) – the definitive popular account of the Scopes Trial
- Lovecraft: A Biography (1975) – the first major biography of H. P. Lovecraft
- Literary Swordsmen and Sorcerers (1976) – a major contribution to the historical study of modern fantasy authors
- Dark Valley Destiny: the Life of Robert E. Howard (1983) (with Catherine Crook de Camp and Jane Whittington Griffin) – the first major biography of Robert E. Howard
- The Ape-Man Within (1995) – Explores how human evolution of aggression and competition affected our historical and social development.
- Time and Chance: an Autobiography (1996) – winner of the 1997 Hugo Award for Best Non-Fiction Book

==== Linguistic studies ====
Some search results can be found through Google Scholar.

- 1944. Pronunciation of upstate New York place-names. American Speech 19:250-265 (Paywall)
- 1973. American English from Eastern Massachusetts. Journal of the International Phonetic Association 3:40-41 (Paywall)
- 1978. American English from Central Texas. Journal of the International Phonetic Association 8:81-82 (Paywall)

== See also ==
- Robert E. Howard's legacy
- Golden Age of Science Fiction
