= The Prisoner of Zhamanak =

1982 novel by Lyon Sprague de Camp

- cover art from the first edition of The Prisoner of Zhamanak
- Author: L. Sprague de Camp
- Cover artist: Victoria Poyser
- Language: English
- Series: Krishna
- Genre: Science fiction
- Publisher: Phantasia Press
- Publication date: 1982
- Publication place: United States
- Media type: Print (Hardback)
- Pages: 228
- Preceded by: The Hostage of Zir
- Followed by: The Virgin of Zesh

The Prisoner of Zhamanak is a science fiction novel by American writer L. Sprague de Camp, the eighth book of his Viagens Interplanetarias series and the sixth of its subseries of stories set on the fictional planet Krishna. Chronologically it is the fourth Krishna novel. It was first published in hardcover by Phantasia Press in 1982, and in paperback by Ace Books in April 1983 as part of the standard edition of the Krishna novels. An E-book edition was published by Gollancz's SF Gateway imprint on September 29, 2011 as part of a general release of de Camp's works in electronic form. The novel has also been translated into German.

As with all of the "Krishna" novels, the title of The Prisoner of Zhamanak has a "Z" in it, a practice de Camp claimed to have devised to keep track of them. Short stories in the series do not follow the practice, nor do Viagens Interplanetarias works not set on Krishna.

== Plot and storyline ==
Word comes to the Terran spaceport of Novorecife that anthropologist Alicia Dyckman, off studying the culture of the tropical Khaldoni nations, has been imprisoned in Zhamanak, one of these realms, by its Heshvavu (king) Khorosh. Diplomat Percy Mjipa, currently between consular assignments, promptly volunteers to rescue her.

Mjipa travels by ship to Kalwm, the much-shrunken remnant of the ancient Empire of the Triple Seas, whose mad king Vuzhov is attempting to build a tower to reach the heavens. From there he attempts to reach Zhamanak by road through the intervening realm of Mutabwk. Mutabwk's scholarly king Ainkhist refuses him passage unless he does him the service of obtaining a copy of Vuzhov's jealously-guarded genealogy, which he desires as a source for a history he is writing of the Khaldoni kingdoms. Perforce returning to Kalwm, Mjipa is unexpectedly granted a copy of the chart in return for serving as a witness for the prosecution at the heresy trial of Doctor Isayin, a local philosopher charged with teaching the world is round. Expected to support the Khaldoni religion's flat world theory, Mjipa uncomfortably commits the requisite perjury, salving his conscience by telling himself the proceedings are fixed against Isayin anyway.

Standard Ace edition of The Prisoner of Zhamanak. Ace Books, 1983.

With passage through Mutabwk now open to him, Mjipa finally reaches Zhamanak. However, Khorosh's only response to his demand that Dyckman be freed is to imprison him with her. He learns that Khorosh regards the alien Terrans as enemies, and that the purpose of their incarceration is to study them. More specifically, now that the king has two of them, he wants to see how they mate. Mjipa, who is married, indignantly refuses, and Alicia, while not sharing his qualms, is also disinclined to perform to satisfy their captor's curiosity. In the course of a long incarceration, they get to know each other, and at times their resolve weakens, but their incompatible personalities help keep them honest; Mjipa being stiff-necked and duty-driven, and Alicia strong-willed, hectoring and opinionated.

At length the two pretend to agree to Khorosh's demand, but only to lure him into the cell, where the powerful Mjipa quickly overpowers him and takes him hostage. Keeping the king's soldiers at bay by threatening his safety, they effect their escape and flee back to Mutabwk, only to be taken prisoner again! It seems that King Ainkhist, also curious in regard to Terran biology, had made certain advances to Alicia during her earlier passage through his realm on her way to Zhamanak, which she repulsed. This time he is determined to have his way with her. Alicia, being a practical sort, sees no alternative this time and so complies, much to her rescuer's chagrin. Allowed to proceed, the pair continues on to Kalwm.

While awaiting a ship to take them to safety, Mjipa and Alicia take in the sights of Kalwm, try to avoid the assassins dispatched on their trail by the vengeful Khorosh, and plot to free the doomed Doctor Isayin, as Mjipa is conscience-stricken by his role in the doctor's condemnation. They succeed in spiriting Isayin out of jail, concealing him in Vuzhov's fabulous tower, but are overtaken by the assassins. Forced to fight their way free of the tower, they flee to their ship, the Tarvazid, and make sail; the assassins pursue in another ship, but are defeated.

Mjipa maroons the remaining assassins on the island of Fossanderan, where the Tarvazid has put in for repairs. Undeterred, the assassins await their chance and ambush the Terrans, only to be taken in turn by the tailed natives of Fossanderan, who assume them to be slavers. Recognizing Mjipa from a previous diplomatic mission, the natives free the Terrans.

Continuing on their way, the two finally return to Novorecife, dropping off Isayin on the way in the free city of Majbur. Back in the Terran enclave the travelers are enthusiastically welcomed. During the ensuing festivities, Alicia encounters tour guide Fergus Reith (protagonist of the earlier novel The Hostage of Zir) and he and she fall head-over-heels in love with each other. Mjipa and his wife, happy to be reunited, look on and foresee trouble ahead.

== Setting ==
The planet Krishna is de Camp's premier creation in the Sword and Planet genre, representing both a tribute to the Barsoom novels of Edgar Rice Burroughs and an attempt to "get it right", reconstructing the concept logically, without what he regarded as Burroughs' biological and technological absurdities. De Camp intended the stories as "pure entertainment in the form of light, humorous, swashbuckling, interplanetary adventure-romances - a sort of sophisticated Burroughs-type story, more carefully thought out than their prototypes."

As dated in James Cambias's GURPS Planet Krishna (a 1997 gaming guide to the Viagens series authorized by de Camp), the action of The Prisoner of Zhamanak takes place in the year 2146 AD., falling between The Hostage of Zir and The Virgin of Zesh (more conclusively dated to 2150), and making it the eighth story set on Krishna in terms of chronology. Internal evidence in The Bones of Zora, which closely follows Virgin, indicates that Prisoner may precede these stories more immediately, which could put its events as late as 2149.

== Reception ==
Publishers Weekly called the book a "light adventure of rescue and escape ... diverting pure entertainment, with comic sparkle and lots of dash."

Susan L. Nickerson, writing for Library Journal demurred, stating that while "Percy's halting progress across three primitive kingdoms is mildly amusing, ... his imprisonment with Alicia so that Khorosh can watch Terran sexual methods is a scenario full of unfulfilled potential. Not one of de Camp's best efforts, Prisoner verges on the tedious."

Robert Coulson in Amazing Science Fiction Stories, reviewing the book together with the a new edition of The Hand of Zei (which he considered "the first (and probably best) novel of the series") called Prisoner "[s]horter than Zei and less inventive, but sufficiently amusing to be well worth reading."

In Issue 24 of Abyss, Dave Nalle commented, "The world and series are quite interesting for the ideas they give of an alien world which is logically consistent\ ... The characters are well developed and the plots are intricate and interesting." Nalle noted, "It is somewhat less action oriented than the other books in the set, but this is balanced off rather well by an added depth of characterization and intellectual content. Nalle concluded, "This is a particularly good book, especially for gamers interested in understanding how a fantasy or SF society rather different from our own works, including some logical parallels in development. I'd recommend it highly."

Greg Costikyan reviewed The Prisoner of Zhamanak in Ares Magazine #15 and commented that "Readers should not be put off by the pulpish names of the Krishna novels; The Prisoner of Zhamanak is not Conan the Blood-Drenched. Rather it is de Camp at his best."

Don D'Ammassa noted that "[a]though there is a strong flavor of humor in most of de Camp's fiction, this is the funniest of the Krishna stories, and one of the best." Addressing this and other late entries in the Viagens series, he wrote "[t]he quality of the series remains undiminished in [these] volumes, which combine good-natured mayhem and a crisp, exciting narrative style.

== Relation to other works ==
The main plot device of bickering male and female protagonists not destined for a happy ending together is featured in several late de Camp novels, notably The Bones of Zora (1983), The Incorporated Knight (1987), and The Pixilated Peeress (1991).

Preceded by The Hostage of Zir	Krishna tales of L. Sprague de Camp; The Prisoner of Zhamanak	Succeeded by The Virgin of Zesh
