= Finished (short story) =

- Short story by L. Sprague de Camp
- Edd Cartier's illustration of the story in Astounding Science Fiction, Nov. 1949
- Country: United States
- Language: English
- Genre: Science fiction

Publication
- Published in: Astounding Science Fiction
- Media type: Print (Magazine)
- Publication date: November 1949

Chronology
- Series: Viagens Interplanetarias
| Calories | The Hand of Zei |

"Finished" is a science fiction short story by American writer L. Sprague de Camp, part of his Viagens Interplanetarias series. It was first published in the magazine Astounding Science Fiction in the issue for November, 1949. It first appeared in book form in the collection The Continent Makers and Other Tales of the Viagens, published in hardcover by Twayne Publishers in 1953 and in paperback by Signet Books in November, 1971.

== Plot summary ==
An interplanetary conference between Viagens officials of the Tau Ceti system being held in Novorecife on the planet Krishna is interrupted by an unusual situation in customs; Ahmad Akelawi, a Terran visitor to Krishna is attempting to take a native mummy to Earth. Cristôvão Abreu, the local security chief, excuses himself to investigate. The mummy, that of the first and (for complicated legal reasons) only king of the island nation of Sotaspé, appears to be a legitimate purchase, and so is allowed through customs.

Subsequently, Ferrian bad-Arjanaq, the reigning prince regent of Sotaspé, shows up claiming the mummy was stolen and the sale fraudulent. To avoid a diplomatic incident, Abreu allows Ferrian to take the next interstellar vessel to Earth to recover the mummy. Since the relatively primitive Krishna is under an embargo to prevent its tumultuous cultures and political systems from being disrupted by advanced Terran technology, he sends along assistant security officer Herculeu Castanhoso to prevent Ferrian from inquiring into matters he shouldn't.

Many years elapse on Krishna before the travelers return with the mummy, though for them, due to the relativistic speeds at which interstellar voyages take place, much less time has passed. Ferrian is sent on his way to his island. Then Abreu learns that a most peculiar ship has rendezvoused with the prince to convey him to Sotaspé—a steamship!

Realizing that somehow Sotaspé has been acquiring forbidden technology, Abreu and Castanhoso set out in pursuit, hiring a swift smuggling ship to overtake Ferrian's craft. Catching it off the island of Darya, their crew overwhelms the prince's in a pitched sea battle, and the prince himself is seemingly lost overboard. The steamship is scuttled, and the mummy, discovered to contain smuggled scientific texts, is also destroyed. The two return to Novorecife smugly convinced that the most egregious attempt ever to break the blockade is "finished."

Meanwhile, Ferrian, who has survived, returns to his kingdom and reassumes its governance. Having been allowed to study Terran law on his trip to Earth to distract him from technological espionage, he is full of ideas for reforming Sotaspé. He institutes a patent law to foster Krishnan invention, and is soon awarding his first patent to the inventor of a native aircraft. At the ceremony, he announces that the Terran plot to keep Krishna backward and in the dark is "finished."

Abreu, Castanhoso and Ferrian all appear as secondary characters in a number of later "Krishna" stories.

== Background ==
This story was written for the "time travel" or "prophecy" issue of Astounding Science Fiction. The issue was prompted by a letter from a reader (Richard A Hoen of the University Club in Buffalo, New York) commenting on the stories in an issue, referring to the stories by author and title, and offering his respective praise and derision for those works. The magazine frequently received letters of this kind; however, in this case, the reader described an issue whose cover date was more than a year away, November, 1949. Editor John W. Campbell printed the letter in the November, 1948 issue, then set about making the predictions come true by arranging with the authors mentioned to write and submit stories with the given titles.

The planet Krishna is de Camp's premier creation in the Sword and Planet genre, representing both a tribute to the Barsoom novels of Edgar Rice Burroughs and an attempt to "get it right", reconstructing the concept logically, without what he regarded as Burroughs' biological and technological absurdities.

As dated in The Continent Makers and Other Tales of the Viagens, the 1959 version of de Camp's essay "The Krishna Stories," and James Cambias's GURPS Planet Krishna (a 1997 gaming guide to the Viagens series authorized by de Camp), the two segments of the action of "Finished" take place in the years 2114 and 2140 AD, respectively, making it both the first and fifth stories set on Krishna in terms of chronology. "Perpetual Motion," The Queen of Zamba and "Calories" take place between the two segments, and The Hand of Zei follows the second.

Earlier events on Krishna are told in the form of back story in "The Colorful Character," the main action of which, according to de Camp's essay, takes place on Earth in the year 2117 AD. The Krishnan events related in the story take place about ten years earlier, or around 2107 AD.

== Notes ==
| Preceded by "The Colorful Character" (back story only) | Krishna tales of L. Sprague de Camp "Finished (part 1)" | Succeeded by "Perpetual Motion" |

| Preceded by "Calories" | Krishna tales of L. Sprague de Camp "Finished (part 2)" | Succeeded by The Hand of Zei |
