= The Venom Trees of Sunga =

1992 novel by Lyon Sprague de Camp

- First edition of The Venom Trees of Sunga
- Author: L. Sprague de Camp
- Cover artist: Darrell K. Sweet
- Language: English
- Series: Kukulkan
- Genre: Science fiction
- Publisher: Del Rey Books
- Publication date: 1992
- Publication place: United States
- Media type: Print (paperback)
- Pages: 211
- ISBN: 0-345-37551-3
- OCLC: 26898737
- Preceded by: The Stones of Nomuru

The Venom Trees of Sunga is a science fiction novel by American writer L. Sprague de Camp, the twelfth book in his Viagens Interplanetarias series and the second in its subseries of stories set on the fictional planet Kukulkan. It was first published in paperback by Del Rey Books in November 1992. An E-book edition was published by Gollancz's SF Gateway imprint on September 29, 2011 as part of a general release of de Camp's works in electronic form.

== Plot summary ==
The lead character Kirk Salazar, a second-generation Terran colonist on the planet Kukulkan, is near the end of his education to become a biologist, lacking only field research to complete his studies. Interested in the evolutionary background of the dominant native species, the intelligent reptilian Kukulkanians, he focuses on a related animal species whose habitat is the poisonous "venom trees" on the remote island of Sunga. To reach his destination he joins a tour group headed for the island, among whom are some family friends worried about their daughter, who has joined a band of Terran cult members there. They discover she has become the cult's leader, and Salazar finds himself caught in the crossfire of a power struggle between the cultists and a Terran logging magnate intent on clear-cutting the venom trees. He is able to save his neck and preserve the habitat of his research subjects by an unorthodox use of his findings, a spectacularly unlikely disguise, and a healthy dose of dumb luck.

== Setting ==
Kukulkan, a planet of the star Epsilon Eridani, is inhabited by intelligent dinosaur-like creatures possessed of a civilization far older than Earth's. Due to the natives' inherent conservatism and an environment deficient in fossil fuels, its technology has not advanced beyond edged weapons and steam-driven vehicles. The Kukulkanians, or "Kooks" as they are known among Terrans, are honest, honor-bound, and dull in personality. Terrans have obtained land for a colony by treaty, and the colonists, consisting primarily of descendants of North American, Russian, and Chinese settlers, co-inhabit the planet in a somewhat uneasy relationship with the natives. The cultural level of the aboriginal race places the Kukulkan stories firmly within the Sword and Planet genre, though the non-humanoid inhabitants are an unusual feature. The Kooks' rational and dispassionate observations allow the authors to present a rather arch perspective on the comparatively less stable Earthlings.

== Unpublished sequel ==
In a letter published in REHupa 113, 11/22/91, at which time The Venom Trees of Sunga was still in press, de Camp wrote that he was then "struggling with a third Kukulcan [sic] novel." The novel in question was not published, and may never have been finished.

== Placement in the Viagens series ==
The Viagens Interplanetarias is never actually mentioned in the novel. Further, these novels portray America, Russia and China as supplying most of the Terran settlers of Kukulkan, in seeming contradiction to the series' premise that these countries have been eclipsed by Brazil in the Viagens future; no Brazilians appear in the novels. Finally, the name of the planet Kukulkan violates the nomenclature previously established for the planetary system of Epsilon Eridani in the introduction and title story of The Continent Makers and Other Tales of the Viagens, according to which the planets take their names from Norse gods like Thor, not Mayan gods like Kukulkan. The first two issues are explicable. Since the novels' activities take place entirely on-planet and Kukulkan's well-established settlements are not dependent on extra-system support, there is no need for the Viagens to play a role. The ethnic make-up of the settlements presumably results from the well-known tendency of depressed economies rather than prosperous ones to supply emigrants. The problem of nomenclature can best be laid to error. Regardless of all such issues, an explicit reference to the key Viagens planet Krishna in The Venom Trees of Sunga definitively places Kukulkan in the Viagens universe.

== Reception ==
Roland J. Green, writing for the Chicago Sun-Times, called the book "light without being fluffy ... [w]itty and briskly paced, with a number of digs at the New Age world-view."

The novel was also reviewed by Scott Winnett in Locus no. 383, December 1992, and Don D'Ammassa in Science Fiction Chronicle no. 159 February, 1993.

Preceded by The Stones of Nomuru	Kukulkan novels of L. Sprague de Camp; The Venom Trees of Sunga	Succeeded by none
