= The Stones of Nomuru =

1988 novel by L. Sprague de Camp and Catherine Crook de Camp

- Cover of the first edition.
- Author: L. Sprague de Camp and Catherine Crook de Camp
- Language: English
- Series: Kukulkan
- Genre: Science fiction
- Publisher: Donning Co.
- Publication date: 1988
- Publication place: United States
- Media type: Print (paperback)
- Pages: v, 215
- ISBN: 0-89865-678-8
- OCLC: 18134188
- Dewey Decimal: 813/.52 19
- LC Class: PS3507.E2344 S7 1988
- Followed by: The Venom Trees of Sunga

The Stones of Nomuru is a science fiction novel by American writers L. Sprague de Camp and Catherine Crook de Camp, the tenth book in the former's Viagens Interplanetarias series and the first in its subseries of stories set on the fictional planet Kukulkan. It was first published as a trade paperback by Donning/Starblaze Editions in September 1988, and as a mass market paperback by Baen Books in May 1991. An E-book edition was published by Gollancz's SF Gateway imprint on September 29, 2011 as part of a general release of de Camp's works in electronic form. It has also been translated into Italian.

== Plot ==
Terran archeologist Keith Salazar’s excavation of the ancient Kukulkan city of Nomuru is endangered by the plans of the avaricious Conrad Bergen to develop the site. Their dispute is complicated by rivalry over Kara Sheffield, Salazar’s former wife, and an invasion of the lands of the civilized Kukulkanians by the Chosa nomads. To preserve his dig and advance his suit, Salazar must avoid being murdered by Bergen, bestir the civilized natives to battle the nomads, and manipulate his superior at the museum funding him in order to secretly supply Terran weapons to his allies.

== Setting ==
Kukulkan, a planet of the star Epsilon Eridani, is inhabited by intelligent dinosaur-like creatures possessed of a civilization far older than Earth's. Due to the natives' inherent conservatism and an environment deficient in fossil fuels, its technology has not advanced beyond edged weapons and steam-driven vehicles. The Kukulkanians, or "Kooks" as they are known among Terrans, are honest, honor-bound, and dull in personality. Terrans have obtained land for a colony by treaty, and the colonists, consisting primarily of descendants of North American, Russian, and Chinese settlers, co-inhabit the planet in a somewhat uneasy relationship with the natives.

The cultural level of the aboriginal race places the Kukulkan stories firmly within the Sword and Planet genre, though the non-humanoid inhabitants are an unusual feature. The Kooks' rational and dispassionate observations allow the authors to present a rather arch perspective on the comparatively less stable Earthlings.

== Placement in the Viagens series ==
The Viagens Interplanetarias is never actually mentioned in the novel. Further, the former novels portray America, Russia and China as supplying most of the Terran settlers of Kukulkan, in seeming contradiction to the series' premise that these countries have been eclipsed by Brazil in the Viagens future; no Brazilians appear in the novels. Finally, the name of the planet Kukulkan violates the nomenclature previously established for the planetary system of Epsilon Eridani in the introduction and title story of The Continent Makers and Other Tales of the Viagens, according to which the planets take their names from Norse gods like Thor, not Mayan gods like Kukulkan. The first two issues are explicable. Since the novels' activities take place entirely on-planet and Kukulkan's well-established settlements are not dependent on extra-system support, there is no need for the Viagens to play a role. The ethnic make-up of the settlements presumably results from the well-known tendency of depressed economies rather than prosperous ones to supply emigrants. The problem of nomenclature can best be laid to error. Regardless of all such issues, an explicit reference to the key Viagens planet Krishna in the second Kukulkan novel, The Venom Trees of Sunga, definitively places Kukulkan in the Viagens universe.

== Reception ==
Danny Low in Other Realms calls the book "a typical de Camp adventure story" filled with his characteristic "satirical humor," and Salazar "a typical de Camp hero, self-deprecating but very competent." He gives it "a slightly more Monty Pythonish flavor than de Camp's previous stories" in which "the protagonist has to maintain a calm front while the world is turned upside down around him." Over all he rates it "a well done book which is a treat from an Old Master such as de Camp," with his "only criticism [being that] one of the problems, the invading nomads, is solved in too much of a deus ex machina style."

Don D'Ammassa finds the book "similar to the Krishna stories, though set on the planet Kukulcan [sic]."

The novel was also reviewed by Fritz Leiber in Locus no. 340, May 1989.

| Preceded by none | Kukulkan novels of L. Sprague de Camp; The Stones of Nomuru | Succeeded by The Venom Trees of Sunga |
