= The Hostage of Zir =

1977 novel by Lyon Sprague de Camp

- First edition of The Hostage of Zir
- Author: L. Sprague de Camp
- Cover artist: J. Harston
- Language: English
- Series: Krishna
- Genre: Science fiction
- Publisher: Berkley/Putnam
- Publication date: 1977
- Publication place: United States
- Media type: Print (Hardback)
- Pages: xi, 213
- ISBN: 0-399-12097-1
- OCLC: 3168622
- Dewey Decimal: 813/.5/2
- LC Class: PZ3.D3555 Ho PS3507.E2344
- Preceded by: The Hand of Zei
- Followed by: The Prisoner of Zhamanak

The Hostage of Zir is a science fiction novel by American writer L. Sprague de Camp, the seventh book of his Viagens Interplanetarias series and the fifth of its subseries of stories set on the fictional planet Krishna. Chronologically it is the third Krishna novel. It was first published in hardcover by Berkley/Putnam in 1977, and in paperback by Berkley Books in 1978. A new paperback edition was published by Ace Books in 1982 as part of the standard edition of the Krishna novels. An e-book edition was published by Gollancz's SF Gateway imprint on September 29, 2011, as part of a general release of de Camp's works in electronic form. The novel has also been translated into German and Czech.

The Hostage of Zir was de Camp's first Krishna novel in a quarter century, the previous one (The Tower of Zanid) having been written in 1952 and published in 1958.

As with all of the "Krishna" novels, the title of The Hostage of Zir has a "Z" in it, a practice de Camp claimed to have devised to keep track of them. Short stories in the series do not follow the practice, nor do Viagens Interplanetarias works not set on Krishna.

== Plot and storyline ==
Tour guide Fergus Reith arrives on the backward world of Krishna with a gaggle of tourists, the first such group to visit the planet. Though he is woefully unprepared and his charges collectively epitomize the "Ugly Terran" stereotype, he readies for his task as best he can and squires his flock off on their grand circuit of the northern Varastou nations among which the Terran spaceport of Novorecife is situated.

The first portion of the novel is an episodic account of their misadventures cruising down the Pichide River, in the Free City of Majbur, and the island kingdom of Zamba. The next few stops, including a visit to the republic of Katai-Jhogorai, are passed over summarily; the real action begins when the group reaches Baianch, capital of the northern kingdom of Dur. There, while taking the new railway to the end of the line, the party is kidnapped by Barré vas-Sarf, bandit ruler of the restive province of Zir. Barré hopes to use them as bargaining chips in his dispute with Tashian bad-Garin, prince-regent of Dur. Reith escapes, only to be captured in turn by the forces of Shosti, the Witch of Zir.

Shosti is Barré's rival for control of Zir and the leader of a local religious cult; her designs on Reith are quite different, as her prophecies lead her to believe she must mate with a red-haired Terran to engender a savior god. A previous captive, Felix Borel (protagonist of the earlier Krishna short story "Perpetual Motion"), had been executed after failing to impregnate Shosti. Reith reads his own fate in Borel's, knowing Terrans and Krishnans are not interfertile – the latter, while near human in appearance, are an alien species. Once more he succeeds in escaping, subsequently leading a raid to free his tourists from Barré.

Apparently safe back in Baianch, Reith relates his adventures to Tashian, with unfortunate results. The account of Terran-Krishnan biological incompatibility inspires the crafty prince-regent to trick Reith into an intimate encounter with Vásni bad-Dushta'en, Princess of Dur, and then marry her off to him by force. The continuation of Tashian's regency is dependent on Vásni producing no legitimate male offspring, a lack her marriage to Reith will ensure. Separated again from his tourists, Reith grimly sets about planning yet another escape. This he achieves thanks to a fortuitous diplomatic visit to Baianch by Pandr (prince) Ferrian bad-Arjanaq of the island nation of Sotaspé, whom Reith had previously encountered in Zamba. (Ferrian was the protagonist of the earlier Krishna short story "Finished".)

Finally winning back to Novorecife, Reith learns his tour group has returned before him, and most have left the planet. He resolves to depart as well, but reconsiders when the guide of the second tour group to reach Krishna suffers an accident, leaving an opening for an experienced guide...

Fergus Reith would go on to become the main recurring character in the Krishna series, reappearing in a minor role in The Prisoner of Zhamanak, and as the protagonist of The Bones of Zora and The Swords of Zinjaban.

== Setting ==
The planet Krishna is de Camp's premier creation in the Sword and Planet genre, representing both a tribute to the Barsoom novels of Edgar Rice Burroughs and an attempt to "get it right", reconstructing the concept logically, without what he regarded as Burroughs' biological and technological absurdities. De Camp intended the stories as "pure entertainment in the form of light, humorous, swashbuckling, interplanetary adventure-romances - a sort of sophisticated Burroughs-type story, more carefully thought out than their prototypes."

As dated in James Cambias's GURPS Planet Krishna (a 1997 gaming guide to the Viagens series authorized by de Camp), the action of The Hostage of Zir takes place in the year 2145 AD., falling between The Hand of Zei and The Prisoner of Zhamanak, and making it the seventh story set on Krishna in terms of chronology. Cambias's dating may be too early, however, as internal evidence in Zhamanak indicates that it occurs shortly after Hostage, while internal evidence in The Bones of Zora indicates that it occurs shortly after Zhamanak, with the events of "The Virgin of Zesh" happening between. As "Virgin" is securely dated to 2150, this could shift the dating of Hostage and Zhamanak as late as 2148 and 2149, respectively.

== Reception ==
Publishers Weekly calls the book a "cheerfully bloody and bawdy adventure, which will strike home to anyone who's experienced conducted travel."

Rosemary Herbert, writing for Library Journal, is less enchanted: "The book is lively at times, particularly when Reith is forced to marry an alien, but for the most part it reads like a traveler's nightmare, full of stereotyped characters, unsympathetically portrayed."

Lester del Rey in Analog Science Fiction/Science Fact has no such complaints, proclaiming "[t]here's only one way to describe [the book]; it's a new Krishna novel. And like de Camp's other popular Krishna novels, it's a wry and wacky story of a human forced to contend with the semicivilized and semihuman cultures of an alien world where Murphy's law always holds good, and nothing ever goes according to plan. You could call it sword-and-sorcery, since swords are buckled with a touch of swash, and human science is a sort of magic to the too-human but egg-laying Krishnans. But the adventure is always cock-eyed." He concludes that "[i]f you've read and enjoyed the other stories of Krishna, you'll want this one. If you haven't read any, this is a good one to start with."

William Mattathias Robins takes a middle tone: "[d]e Camp's travelers are a misfit crew of oversexed, silly, selfish, xenophobic outlanders. Reith, however, is an appealing young man who is literally transformed from an introvert to a composed, even heroic, leader. Most of the action is seen through his eyes, so the reader shares in his growth, and the novel proves successful."

Don D'Ammassa, noting that de Camp has written "some of the best SF as well as fantasy" and "sword and swashbuckles with the best of them, [feels] this novel seems to have lost much of the spirit that infused [his] earlier work. ... For whatever reason, much of the humor in ZIR is flat and not very amusing, and the adventure sequences aren't particularly exciting. There's some good light adventure, but the zestful writing of THE SEARCH FOR ZEI and LEST DARKNESS FALL is missing." He later revisited this opinion, and addressing this and other late entries in the Viagens series, writes "[t]he quality of the series remains undiminished in [these] volumes, which combine good-natured mayhem and a crisp, exciting narrative style.

Preceded by The Hand of Zei	Krishna tales of L. Sprague de Camp; The Hostage of Zir	Succeeded by The Prisoner of Zhamanak
