= Antarctic Conquest =

Book by Finn Ronne

- First edition
- Author: Finn Ronne
- Language: English
- Subject: Exploration
- Publisher: G. P. Putnam's Sons
- Publication date: 1949
- Publication place: United States
- Media type: Print (Hardback)

Antarctic Conquest: the Story of the Ronne Expedition 1946-1948 is a 1949 science book by Norwegian-American Antarctic explorer Finn Ronne and science fiction writer L. Sprague de Camp, published in hardcover by G. P. Putnam's Sons. The role of de Camp, who was commissioned as a ghost writer to recast Ronne's manuscript into publishable form, is uncredited. Ronne's working title was reportedly "Conquering the Antarctic".

== Summary ==
The book relates the story of the Ronne Antarctic Research Expedition, which researched the area surrounding the head of the Weddell Sea in Antarctica from 1947–1948.

== Relationship to other works ==
De Camp's work with Ronne is reflected in two of his contemporary Viagens Interplanetarias science fiction stories set on the fictional planet Krishna. One, the short story "Calories," adopts an Antarctic setting not utilized in any of the series's other stories; in the other, the novel The Hand of Zei, the protagonist adopts the alias of an inhabitant of the planet's Antarctic and is, like de Camp, employed as a ghostwriter for his explorer boss.
