= Calories (story) =

- Short story by L. Sprague de Camp
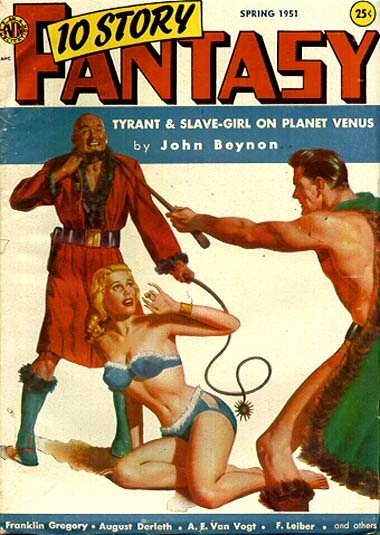
- Original title: Getaway on Krishna
- Country: United States
- Language: English
- Genre: Science fiction

Publication
- Published in: Ten Story Fantasy
- Media type: Print (Magazine)
- Publication date: Spring 1951

Chronology
- Series: Viagens Interplanetarias
The Queen of Zamba	Finished

"Calories" is a science fiction short story by American writer L. Sprague de Camp, part of his Viagens Interplanetarias series. It was first published under the title "Getaway on Krishna" in the magazine Ten Story Fantasy in the issue for Spring 1951. It first appeared in book form under the present title in the collection Sprague de Camp's New Anthology of Science Fiction, published simultaneously in hardcover by Hamilton and in paperback by Panther Books in 1953.

== Plot summary ==
Set in the Antarctic region of the planet Krishna, "Calories" focuses on a long pursuit of two Earthmen, Cuthwin ("Dinky") Singer and Earl Okagamut, by a numerous and well-equipped cohort of fanatical soldiers from the Krishnan theocracy of Nichnyamadze. In contrast to their pursuers, Singer and Okagamut are possessed of a minimum of equipment and supplies. The chase tests the endurance of both fugitives and hunters, with the latter slowly but surely overtaking the former.

In the end, however, the Krishnans halt and give up the chase, as Okagamut, who is of Inuit heritage, has calculated they must. Having determined the caloric requirements of the trip he knew that he and his companion, subsisting on dried meat, could complete the journey, while the soldiers, whose religion requires a vegetarian diet, could not. Worn out by the pursuit, they have no option but to return to more temperate climes or perish. The life-and-death clash the story was apparently building up to is precluded by Okagamut's display of cleverness.

== Setting ==
The planet Krishna is de Camp's premier creation in the Sword and Planet genre, representing both a tribute to the Barsoom novels of Edgar Rice Burroughs and an attempt to "get it right", reconstructing the concept logically, without what he regarded as Burroughs' biological and technological absurdities. De Camp intended the stories as "pure entertainment in the form of light, humorous, swashbuckling, interplanetary adventure-romances—a sort of sophisticated Burroughs-type story, more carefully thought out than their prototypes."

As dated in the 1959 version of de Camp's essay, "The Krishna Stories," the action of "Calories" takes place in the year 2122 A.D., falling between the first part of "Finished" and Perpetual Motion, which would make it the second story set on Krishna in terms of chronology. However, internal evidence indicates that it actually falls between The Queen of Zamba and the second part of "Finished", the attempt to break the Viagens embargo on advanced technology in the former being mentioned as recent news, while the characters show no knowledge of the equally notorious assault on the ban in the latter. This would date the story between the years 2138 and 2140, presumably about 2139, making it the fourth story set on Krishna.

== Relationship to other works ==
This early Viagens story on the planet Krishna is something of a curiosity, being one of de Camp's set-piece gimmick yarns, a specialty of his at the beginning of his career but atypical of the sword and planet Krishna tales. Equally atypical is his departure from the Triple Seas area, the scene of all other stories set on Krishna, for the planet's Antarctic region, a choice possibly influenced by his then recent collaboration with Finn Ronne on the non-fiction book Antarctic Conquest: the Story of the Ronne Expedition 1946-1948 (1949). De Camp's work with Ronne may also be reflected in the early Krishna novel The Hand of Zei, in which the protagonist adopts the alias of an inhabitant of the planet's Antarctic and is, like de Camp, employed as a ghostwriter for his explorer boss.

== Notes ==
Preceded by The Queen of Zamba	Krishna tales of L. Sprague de Camp "Calories"	Succeeded by Finished" (part 2)
