= Sprague de Camp's New Anthology of Science Fiction =

1953 collection of science fiction stories by L. Sprague de Camp

- Cover of the first edition.
- Author: L. Sprague de Camp
- Language: English
- Genre: Science fiction
- Publisher: Panther
- Publication date: 1953
- Publication place: United Kingdom
- Media type: Print (hardback & paperback)
- Pages: 158

Sprague de Camp's New Anthology of Science Fiction is a collection of science fiction stories by American writer L. Sprague de Camp, edited by H. J. Campbell. It was first published in both hardcover and paperback in 1953 by Panther Books.

The book contains six short works of fiction by the author, the first two of them stories in his Viagens Interplanetarias series not collected elsewhere.

== Contents ==
- "Introduction" by H. J. Campbell
- "Calories"
- "The Colourful Character"
- "Juice"
- "Proposal"
- "The Saxon Pretender"
- "The Space Clause"

== Reception ==
Anthony Boucher, writing in The Magazine of Fantasy and Science Fiction, called the book "most misleadingly titled; it is not an anthology edited by de Camp, but a group of six de Camp stories selected by H. J. Campbell." While noting they were "[a]ll new to book form," he considered them "a drab assemblage of unfunny humor and (what is even less forgivable) unsexy sex."
