= Summer Wear =

- Short story by L. Sprague de Camp
- Illustration of the story in Startling Stories, May 1950
- Country: United States
- Language: English
- Genre: Science fiction

Publication
- Published in: Startling Stories
- Publisher: Better Publications, Inc.
- Media type: Print (magazine)
- Publication date: May, 1950
- Series: Viagens Interplanetarias

"Summer Wear" is a science fiction short story by American writer L. Sprague de Camp, part of his Viagens Interplanetarias series. It is the first (chronologically) set on the planet Osiris. It was first published in the magazine Startling Stories in the issue for May, 1950. It first appeared in book form in the anthology The Best Science Fiction Stories: 1951, edited by Everett F. Bleiler and T. E. Dikty, published in hardcover by Frederick Fell in 1951, and was gathered together with other Viagens stories in the collection The Continent Makers and Other Tales of the Viagens, published in hardcover by Twayne Publishers in 1953, and in paperback by Signet Books in 1971. The story has been translated into Portuguese, Dutch, Italian and German.

== Plot summary ==
Terrans Cato Chapman and Celia Zorn, respectively a salesman and model affiliated with the fashionable summer wear firm Greenfarb's of Hollywood, embark on the Viagens starship Camões, bound for the planet Osiris. They hope to create a market for Greenfarb's styles among the reptilian Osirians, who natively wear nothing but body paint.

Chapman and Celia quickly discover they have rivals on board; Jean-Jaques Bergerat and Anya Savinkov, representing Tomaselli's of Paris. Amid interesting interplay with the other passengers, including both Terrans and alien Osirians and Thothians, the voyage becomes a double exercise in industrial espionage as Chapman and Bergerat each attempt to sabotage the other. Bergerat succeeds in spoiling Chapman's samples, but is caught and incarcerated due to Chapman's machinations; the latter thereupon appropriates Bergerat's own samples as replacements.

On Osiris, Chapman, Celia and Anya hold a fashion show, their products become wildly popular with the Osirians, and they secure a contract for Greenfarb's. Chapman and Bergerat end their dispute on the return voyage and each becomes involved with (and marries) his former rival's business partner. As the interstellar voyage between the Solar System and the Procyon system harboring Osiris takes five months subjective time (and over ten years objective time) each way, there is ample opportunity for such bonds to form.

Back on Earth, a surprise awaits them; Osirian body paint has become the rage there during their nearly two dozen years' absence, and both Greenfarb's and Tomaselli's have gone out of business!

The action of "Summer Wear" takes place in the years 2104-2128 AD.

== Setting ==
The planet Osiris is an arid world orbiting Procyon in the same star system as Thoth, a wet planet whose natives are amoral and anarchic.

Osiris's dinosauroid inhabitants are characterized as both sentimental and rapaciously capitalistic; they are also possessed of mind-controlling powers, generally referred to as "telepathic pseudohypnosis," against which other intelligent species must take special precautions.

== Sources ==
- Summer Wear title listing at the Internet Speculative Fiction Database
- Laughlin, Charlotte; Daniel J. H. Levack (1983). De Camp: An L. Sprague de Camp Bibliography. San Francisco: Underwood/Miller. pp. 246–247, 44–45.
