= The Space Clause =

- Short story by L. Sprague de Camp
- Country: United States
- Language: English
- Genre: Science fiction

Publication
- Published in: If: Worlds of Science Fiction
- Publisher: Quinn Publishing Company, Inc.
- Media type: Print (Magazine)
- Publication date: September 1952

"The Space Clause" is a science fiction short story by L. Sprague de Camp. It was first published in the magazine If: Worlds of Science Fiction for September, 1952. It first appeared in book form in the collection Sprague de Camp's New Anthology of Science Fiction (Hamilton, 1953), and afterwards appeared in the later collection Footprints on Sand (Advent, 1981).

== Plot summary ==
In the wake of World War III, the World Constitutional Convention, convened in the former headquarters of the United Civilized States in the Rhône Valley, is negotiating the form to be taken by the first true world government. Dr. Mateo Aguirre, delegate from the Andean Federation, is upset because the convention refuses to take seriously his proposed "Space Clause," intended to regulate relations between Earth and possible extraterrestrial civilizations. Moreover, he fears for his life. He sold the dictatorial head of the federation, President Juan de la Torre, on promoting the clause, to the extent that La Torre will feel affronted if it is not adopted. In that event, he may well take out his embarrassment on Aguirre by having him executed. Journalist Dagobert Heck, sympathetic to Aquirre's plight, decides to try to load the dice in the clause's favor before the final vote. He enlists the aid of Richard Nugent, a former colleague in India, in his effort.

The next day, American Secretary of State Myron Kalish, rotating president of the convention, receives a report of an alien landing in Sikkim. Pending confirmation of the report, Kalish postpones the vote, as the timing appears suspicious and the delegates suspect a hoax. Yet, after the convention adjourns for the day additional reports are received, which continue the next morning, all appearing to support the authenticity of the landing. As a result, La Torre redoubles his efforts on behalf of the Space Clause, and there is a scramble to pass it. The clause is adopted just before La Torre and Aguirre fly back to South America in response to domestic disturbances there.

Even before the Andeans arrive home, however, bad news is received; the landing was a hoax after all, perpetrated by Heck and Nugent. While no one thinks it worthwhile to repeal the clause, La Torre is humiliated. Feeling himself a laughing stock, the dictator furiously orders Aquirre hung. Following their return to the federation, despite pleas for clemency from various other countries, La Torre personally oversees the execution. Immediately after the hanging, however, La Torre is visited by Mencias Mola, his ambassador to Mexico. A genuine alien landing occurred there a few hours before, and Mencias has brought Vraku, one of the extraterrestrials, to meet La Torre in an effort to have Aguirre spared. In an abrupt about-face, La Torre proclaims the late Aguirre a martyr to his country and a paragon of wisdom and loyalty who is to be recognized with a medal—sadly, a posthumous award.

== Reception ==
Anthony Boucher characterized the story along with the others collected in Sprague de Camp's New Anthology of Science Fiction as "a drab assemblage of unfunny humor and (what is even less forgivable) unsexy sex."
