= Rogue Queen =

1951 science fiction novel by L. Sprague de Camp

- first edition of Rogue Queen
- Author: L. Sprague de Camp
- Cover artist: Richard Powers
- Language: English
- Series: Viagens Interplanetarias
- Genre: Science fiction
- Publisher: Doubleday
- Publication date: 1951
- Publication place: United States
- Media type: Print (hardback)
- Pages: ix, 222 pp

Rogue Queen is a science fiction novel by American writer L. Sprague de Camp, the third book in his Viagens Interplanetarias series. It was first published in hardcover by Doubleday in 1951, and in paperback by Dell Books in 1952. A later hardcover edition was issued by The Easton Press in its The Masterpieces of Science Fiction series in 1996; later paperback editions were issued by Ace Books (1965) and Signet Books (November 1972, reprinted June 1978). A trade paperback edition was issued by Bluejay Books in June 1985. The first British edition was published in paperback by Pinnacle Books in 1954; a British hardcover reprint followed from Remploy in 1974. The novel has been translated into Portuguese, Italian, French and German. An E-book edition was published by Gollancz's SF Gateway imprint on September 29, 2011 as part of a general release of de Camp's works in electronic form.

== Plot and storyline ==
On the planet of the star Lalande 21185, known to Terrans as Ormazd, the dominant humanoid species is organized into hive societies much like those of Earth's ants and bees. In each community a hyper-fertile queen and a handful of male drones are responsible for reproduction, while all other tasks are performed by sterile female workers. This status quo is disrupted by the arrival of the Paris, an exploratory spacecraft of the Viagens Interplanetarias, Earth's space authority. Its mixed crew of socially equal and universally fertile males and females opens up other possibilities to the natives, and particularly to Iroedh, a scholarly worker from the community of Elham. Her own antiquarian research leads her to the conclusion that Ormazd's society may once have been like Earth's. Her peers, however, are only interested in ferreting out the Terrans' technological secrets for possible military use. Iroedh, by making friends with Winston Bloch and Barbe Dulac, two of the newcomers, ironically finds herself in a better position to do this than her more self-interested comrades.

Hoping to save Antis, a condemned drone for whom she harbors platonically romantic feelings, Iroedh uses her new friends first to effect a rescue and then to intervene in Elhamni politics to reverse his death sentence. The second effort backfires, making her, Antis and their allies fugitives. Hunted by both the Elhamni and the outlaw band of the rogue drone Wythias, who is intent on gaining Terran weaponry, they get lost in the wilderness and come near to starvation. To survive Iroedh is forced to abandon her vegetarian worker diet and eat meat, which is deemed poisonous to all females except queens. Its actual effect on her is to cause her to mature sexually, making her a queen herself, though one without a community to rule. She and Antis become lovers. Afterwards, still pursued by Wythias' band, the four succeed in reaching the Oracle of Ledhwid, a neutral power in the midst of the warring communities. To their surprise, the current occupant of the Oracle's office proves to be another alien, Gildakk from the planet Thoth in the Procyonic system, the sole survivor of an earlier expedition.

With Gildakk's aid the rogue drones are fought to a standstill and then made allies by demonstrating in a parlay that Iroedh has become a functional female; Gildakk points out that if other workers follow her example all the drones can have mates of their own. Wythias murders Gildakk in an attempt to preserve his authority, and is in turn killed by Barbe. The other drones take Iroedh and Antis as their new leaders. The reconstituted force then returns to Elham to aid in its defense against the hostile community of Tvaarm, which has just launched a long-expected invasion. The government that outlawed Iroedh and Antis is overthrown, and the combined force of their drones and Elham's warriors defeat the enemy. A social and political revolution ensues in Elham, and Iroedh and Antis accept appointment as representatives of the Viagens Interplanetarias to the city-states of Ormazd.

== Themes ==
Rogue Queen broke the taboo on sexual themes in American science fiction, paving the way for more daring works by Philip José Farmer and others. De Camp's approach to the charged issue was decidedly non-erotic and non-exploitive, treating it matter-of-factly as a part of his characters' lives that happened to be both incidental and integral to his plot. In effect, he normalizes it by making it a matter of discussion rather than depiction, relegating any awkwardness to the minds of the characters. Steven Silver speculated that "without Rogue Queen to lay the groundwork, it is possible that the anthropological science fiction of a later age, as well as its gender examinations, would not have occur[r]ed in the manner it did."

== Reception ==
Early reviews were largely positive. Anthony Boucher praised de Camp for "producing a science-fiction narrative which is entirely about sex, and, surprisingly, non-pornographic," characterizing the narrative as "that rarest of collector's items: a completely new science-fiction plot." Later he and J. Francis McComas rated Rogue Queen as "[t]he most interesting recent fictional extrapolation," noting that "[l]ively and unusual thinking, a vigorous plot, and a most appealing non-human heroine make [it] the best de Camp novel in many years.". Groff Conklin described the novel as "without doubt the best item de Camp has yet developed out of his concept of Viagens Interplanetarias", lauding "[t]he meticulously scientific way in which de Camp develops details of this culture on a far-distant planet to parallel a bee society [as] fascinating," with "[t]he story of how this is accomplished ... made so circumstantially real, so humanly plausible, that the book becomes a sheer delight to read." P. Schuyler Miller also called the novel the series's "most handsome dividend," finding it "by long odds the best of the Viagens stories, worked out with the de Campian flair for meticulously ridiculous logic." He also called it "the masterpiece of the Viagens series, and one of the best books in modern SF." The reviewer for Startling Stories characterized the book as "another in the same vein" in the author's "growing list of gentle satires," with "[t]he story ... relatively unimportant, ... there only as a vehicle for the author to ride in while he pokes fun at humans and their frailties." Villiers Gerson called it "an ingenious, amusing tale" in which "[t]hat clever science-fiction writer ... for once blended satisfactorily both gimmick and characterization."

Later commentators tended to echo the earlier opinions. William Mattathias Robins called it "one of [de Camp's] best novels." Joe De Bolt and John R. Pfeiffer noted that "[t]he contrast in sexual patterns produces humorous misunderstandings on the part of the Ormazdians, and serves to satirize our romantic conventions." Robert Coulson "highly recommended" the book. After noting it "is my wife Juanita's favorite science-fiction novel, and Iroedh her favorite character ... [with whom], as a grown-up tomboy, [she] identified completely," confessed "I'm quite partial to the book, too; if I don't quite agree that it's the best stf novel ever written, it's certainly somewhere in the top dozen or so." According to Colleen Power, "DeCamp uses the novel to highlight the role that a relatively simple advance can make in changing a society. ... This novel contains some fine touches that reveal DeCamp's ability to mature as a writer. His characterizations are stronger, his women less stereotypical, and the action just as entertaining as in his earlier works. ... He creates a complex, alien, yet hauntingly familiar society." She notes that Rogue Queen is regarded by critics as DeCamp's finest science fiction novel." David Pringle, giving it a rating of two out of three stars, characterizes it as "[a]dventure with touches of satire, told in its author's customary light manner." Harry Turtledove described the novel as, "among other things, a splendid satire on Marxism."

The book is rated more harshly in some of the most recent assessments, particularly by feminist reviewers. Steven Silver, after praising "the first half of the novel [for] describing the amazing society of the Avtini," regrets that "[u]nfortunately, de Camp turns the story into an adventure novel about half way through ... losing the train of the novel. Instead of exploring the changing gender roles, he is merely relating a sword and sorcery adventure, with science taking the place of the sorcery." He states that it "begins as the sort of novel in which Ursula K. Le Guin examines gender roles and makes us think about what society forces on a person based solely on their sex [but] de Camp does not sustain this anthropological study, partly, perhaps, due to the phase in his career, and in science fiction, during which it was written." Had it been written later it "[p]erhaps ... could [have] live[d] up to its potential." He is not unmindful, however, of the book's role in making works such as Le Guin's possible.

Laura Quilter called it "pretty interesting sf, but annoying as hell. Even for the early 50s." Quoting an early review from the Hartford Courant, which praised its subtlety, she "beg[s] to differ," pointing out how the development of the plot upheld and championed the approved gender relationships of the time and place in which it was written. She concludes that "[t]he funny thing is that this story is such a satire of itself, now, that if it were written today it would be targeted as a 'political correct satire.'"
