= Git Along! =

- Short story by L. Sprague de Camp
- 1971 edition of The Continent Makers, illustrating a scene from "Git Along!"
- Country: United States
- Language: English
- Genre: Science fiction

Publication
- Published in: Astounding Science Fiction
- Media type: Print (Magazine)
- Publication date: August, 1950

Chronology
- Series: Viagens Interplanetarias
The Animal-Cracker Plot	—

"Git Along!" is a science fiction short story by American writer L. Sprague de Camp, part of his Viagens Interplanetarias series. It is the second (chronologically) set on the planet Osiris, as well as the second to feature the interstellar con-man Darius Koshay. It was first published in the magazine Astounding in the issue for August, 1950. It first appeared in book form in the anthology The Outer Reaches, edited by August Derleth, published in hardcover by Pellegrini and Cudahy in 1951, and was gathered together with other Viagens stories in the collection The Continent Makers and Other Tales of the Viagens, published in hardcover by Twayne Publishers in 1953, and in paperback by Signet Books in 1971. The story has been translated into Portuguese, Dutch, Italian and German.

== Plot summary ==
Con man Darius Koshay, stranded in the Uranus spaceport fleeing an arrest warrant from Earth, falls in with promoter Moritz Gloppenheimer, who hopes to open a dude ranch on the planet Osiris. Plying him with drink until the promoter loses consciousness, Koshay steals his identity, papers and scheme, leaving his victim to be arrested as "Koshay". After the voyage to Osiris he puts Gloppenheimer's plan into action, forming a syndicate with Shishirhe, Yathasia and Fessahen, the three Osirian mayors of Cefef Aqh, for the purpose. Within a Terran year, the ranch is operational and all is going well for Koshay, aside from some unwelcome attention from Afasiè, a female Osirian besotted with both the ranch and its operator. Then he discovers that the vengeful Gloppenheimer has followed him to Osiris and is starting a rival operation, the "Cefef Aqh Hunt Club".

Soon one of the ranch's round-ups gets mixed up with one of Gloppenheimer's hunts, and the Terran enemies come to blows, with Koshay's gun accidentally discharging. Two of the Cefef Aqh mayors, disaffected from Koshay and present with the hunting party, promptly try and convict him on the spot for the attempted murder of Gloppenheimer; Koshay's patron Shishirhe protests but is outvoted. Afasiè, whose uncle is a Provincial Inspector, summons aid in time to save Koshay from being hanged. The case is transferred to the Provincial Court of Appeals, where the whole truth comes out. The two Terrans are both ordered deported, and as the native spacecraft that will transport them has but one compartment for non-Osirians, they will have to share a cell all the way back to the Solar System!

The action of "Git Along!" takes place in the years 2135-2148 AD. One of Koshay's earlier operations is the subject of the story "The Animal-Cracker Plot" set on the planet Vishnu.

== Setting ==
The planet Osiris is an arid world orbiting Procyon in the same star system as Thoth, a wet planet whose natives are amoral and anarchic.

Osiris's dinosauroid inhabitants are characterized as both sentimental and rapaciously capitalistic; they are also possessed of mind-controlling powers, generally referred to as "telepathic pseudohypnosis," against which other intelligent species must take special precautions.
