= Footprints on Sand =

1981 collection of writings by L. Sprague de Camp and Catherine Crook de Camp

- first edition of Footprints on Sand
- Author: L. Sprague de Camp and Catherine Crook de Camp
- Illustrator: C.H. Burnett
- Cover artist: C.H. Burnett
- Language: English
- Genre: Science fiction and fantasy short stories, poems, essays
- Publisher: Advent
- Publication date: 1981
- Publication place: United States
- Media type: Print (hardback)
- Pages: xvii, 327 pp
- ISBN: 0-911682-25-2
- OCLC: 8315882
- Dewey Decimal: 818/.5208/08 19
- LC Class: PS3507.E2344 F6 1981

Footprints on Sand: a Literary Sampler is a 1981 collection of writings by science fiction authors L. Sprague de Camp and Catherine Crook de Camp, illustrated by C. H. Burnett, published by Advent. The collection was compiled to celebrate the de Camps' appearance as joint Guests of Honor at the June 12–14, 1981 X-Con science fiction convention in Milwaukee, Wisconsin and was limited to 1000 copies. An ebook edition was issued by ReAnimus Press in February 2021.

== Summary ==
The book opens with a series of tributes to the de Camps by Robert A. Heinlein, Lin Carter, Isaac Asimov, Poul Anderson, Andrew J. Offutt, Patricia Jackson, and George H. Scithers. The bulk of the work consists of various short works by the de Camps themselves, representing the range of their work in fantasy, science fiction, juvenile fiction, poetry and non-fiction.

== Contents ==
- "Preamble", Catherine Crook de Camp
- A Flourish of Trumpets: Tributes from Indulgent Friends
  - "Introduction to The Glory That Was", Robert A. Heinlein
  - "Quixote With a Pen", Lin Carter
  - "L. Sprague de Camp — Guest of Honor", Isaac Asimov
  - "All About Catherine", Isaac Asimov
  - "Memoirs of a de Camp Fan", Poul Anderson
  - "The Lyon of Fantasy and Science Fiction", Andrew J. Offutt
  - "Catherine and L. Sprague de Camp", Patricia Jackson
  - "Why L. Sprague de Camp Writes", George Scithers
- Ink Blots from Two Pens: Selections from Our Writings
  - "One Day in the Cretaceous", Sprague and Catherine de Camp
  - "Letter to Savage Sword of Conan", L. Sprague de Camp
  - "Range", L. Sprague de Camp
  - "Preface to the Necromonicon", L. Sprague de Camp
  - "The Great Glass Jewel", L. Sprague and Catherine de Camp
  - "The Coming of the Engineers", L. Sprague de Camp
  - "Should Your Child Read Science Fiction?", Catherine de Camp
  - "Atlantis and the City of Silver", L. Sprague and Catherine de Camp
- Wind Chimes at Twilight: Some Thoughts in Verse
  - "Credo" (poem), Catherine de Camp
  - "Cloth of Love" (poem), Catherine de Camp
  - "Achievements" (poem), Catherine de Camp
  - "Sky Train" (poem), Catherine de Camp
  - "Moon Shadows" (poem), Catherine de Camp
  - "Love Song" (poem), Catherine de Camp
  - "In Memoriam" (poem), Catherine de Camp
  - "A Song for Tomorrow" (poem), Catherine de Camp
  - "The Gods" (poem), L. Sprague de Camp
  - "Xeroxing the Necromonicon" (poem), L. Sprague de Camp
  - "The Trap" (poem), L. Sprague de Camp
  - "The Opossum" (poem), L. Sprague de Camp
  - "The Ameba" (poem), L. Sprague de Camp
  - "Ripples" (poem), L. Sprague de Camp
  - "A Tale of Two John Carters" (poem), L. Sprague de Camp
  - "Carnac" (poem), L. Sprague de Camp
- Strange Happenings: Stories for the Very Young
  - "The Boy Who Could Fly", Catherine de Camp
  - "The Horse Show", Catherine de Camp
  - "The Million Dollar Pup", Catherine de Camp
- Dreams and Surmises: Stories for the Not So Young
  - "The Space Clause", L. Sprague de Camp
  - "Windfall", Catherine de Camp
  - "Eudoric's Unicorn", L. Sprague de Camp
  - "The Emperor's Fan", L. Sprague de Camp
  - "Algy", L. Sprague de Camp
- "Postscript", L. Sprague de Camp

== Reception ==
Tom Easton in Analog Science Fiction/Science Fact calls the book "a lovely demonstration of the de Camp versatility, a testimonial to a rare marriage, and a tribute ... sheer delight for every fan of either (or both) of the de Camps."
