= Star Hero =

Tabletop role-playing game

- Cover of Star Hero for Hero System fifth edition
- Designers: James Cambias, Steve Long
- Publishers: Hero Games
- Publication: 1989, 2002, 2011
- Genres: Science fiction
- Systems: Hero System

Star Hero is a science fiction role-playing game published by Hero Games and Iron Crown Enterprises (ICE) in 1989. The game uses the Hero System rules also used in other Hero Games publications such as Champions and Danger International.

== Description ==
Players take on the role of space adventurers. Similar to other Hero Game publications, players use dice to determine the scores for basic attributes such as Strength and Dexterity. They then spend a pool of Hero points to buy skills. Or rather than taking the time to do this, a player can simply use a pre-generated template such as Starship Pilot or Scientist.

In addition to the standard Hero System rules for skills resolution and combat, Star Hero includes rules for starship construction, future technology and creating new alien races.

The game also gives general guidelines for creating a campaign.

== Hero Universe ==
The official Hero Universe setting divides the science fiction genre into five historical periods: Solar Hero (years 2080 to 2200), Interstellar Hero (2200–2300), Alien Wars (2300–2400), The Terran Empire (2400–2700), and The Galactic Federation (2700-3000).

== Publication history ==
After Hero Games/ICE released a third edition of the Hero System, Sam Browne and Paula Woods used the new rules to create Star Hero, a 192-page book published in 1989 with illustrations by Timothy Bradstreet, Richard H. Britton, Rick Harris, and Douglas Shuler.

In 2002, following the release of the 5th edition of the Hero System, Star Hero was updated to reflect the new rules. This book was dedicated to RJM Hughes, an avid poster at the Hero Games forums, who died in August 2002 due to complications from diabetes.

=== Fifth Edition Star Hero supplements ===
- Terran Empire by James Cambias, 2003
- The Spacer's Toolkit by Ben Seeman, 2003
- Alien Wars by Allen Thomas, 2003
- Worlds of Empire by Allen Thomas, Ben Seeman, Jason Walters, Steve Long, and Darren Watts, 2006

Following the release of the sixth edition of the Hero System in 2011, a new edition of Star Hero was published as well.

== Reception ==
David Rogers reviewed the first edition of Star Hero in Space Gamer Vol. II No. 1. Rogers commented that "Overall, I give Star Hero a B+ for presentation, largely because of artwork and sloppy editing. The game, though, plays like a winner. If you're looking for roleplaying science fiction that allows you design your own characters rather than relying on dice to make up your characters for you, this is your game."

In his 1990 book The Complete Guide to Role-Playing Games, game critic Rick Swan called this "An intelligent, comprehensive science-fiction RPG," noting that it "includes just about everything necessary for an exciting outer space campaign except a detailed setting." The lack of a campaign universe was the only issue Swan had with this game, writing, "the lack of a focused campaign setting, such as those offered in MegaTraveller and Star Wars, is the game's biggest drawback; the referee will either have to build a universe from scratch (a mighty tall order), or graft the Star Hero rules onto a preexisting setting." Despite this, Swan gave the game a solid rating of 3 out of 4, saying, "those looking for a simple, comprehensive overview of science-fiction role-playing should enjoy Star Hero."

== Other reviews ==
- Pyramid
