= The Best Science Fiction Stories: 1951 =

1951 anthology edited by Everett F. Bleiler and T. E. Dikty

- First edition dust jacket.
- Editors: Everett F. Bleiler and T. E. Dikty
- Language: English
- Genre: Science fiction
- Publisher: Fredrick Fell
- Publication date: 1951
- Publication place: United States
- Media type: Print (hardback)
- Pages: 351
- Preceded by: The Best Science Fiction Stories: 1950
- Followed by: The Best Science Fiction Stories: 1952

The Best Science Fiction Stories: 1951 is a 1951 anthology of science fiction short stories edited by Everett F. Bleiler and T. E. Dikty. An abridged edition was published in the UK by Grayson in 1952 under the title "The Best Science Fiction Stories: Second Series". Most of the stories had originally appeared in 1950 in the magazines Fantasy and Science Fiction, Worlds Beyond, Astounding SF, Other Worlds, Galaxy Science Fiction, Fantastic Story Quarterly, Startling Stories, Collier's Weekly, Thrilling Wonder Stories and Weird Tales.

== Contents ==
- Introduction, by Everett F. Bleiler & T. E. Dikty
- "The Santa Claus Planet", by Frank M. Robinson
- "The Gnurrs Come from the Voodvork Out", by Reginald Bretnor
- "The Mindworm", by Cyril Kornbluth
- "The Star Ducks", by Bill Brown
- "Not to Be Opened—", by Roger Flint Young
- "Process", by A. E. van Vogt
- "Forget-Me-Not", by William F. Temple
- "Contagion", by Katherine MacLean
- "Trespass!", by Poul Anderson & Gordon Dickson
- "Oddy and Id", by Alfred Bester
- "To Serve Man", by Damon Knight
- "Summer Wear", by L. Sprague de Camp
- "Born of Man and Woman", by Richard Matheson
- "The Fox in the Forest", by Ray Bradbury
- "The Last Martian", by Fredric Brown
- "The New Reality", by Charles L. Harness
- "Two Face", by Frank Belknap Long
- "Coming Attraction", by Fritz Leiber

== Reception ==
P. Schuyler Miller described the anthology as an "intelligent, representative, well-balanced panorama of the science-fiction field."

== Sources ==
- Contento, William G. "Index to Science Fiction Anthologies and Collections". Archived from the original on 2008-01-04.
