= The Hand of Zei =

1950 novel by Lyon Sprague de Camp

- First edition of the full text of The Hand of Zei
- Author: L. Sprague de Camp
- Illustrator: Edd Cartier
- Cover artist: Kelly Freas
- Language: English
- Series: Krishna
- Genre: Science fiction
- Publisher: Owlswick Press
- Publication date: 1981
- Publication place: United States
- Media type: Print (Hardback)
- Pages: 276
- ISBN: 0-913896-20-9
- OCLC: 8119708
- Dewey Decimal: 813/.52 19
- LC Class: PS3507.E2344 H3 1981
- Preceded by: "Finished"
- Followed by: The Hostage of Zir

The Hand of Zei is a science fiction novel by American writer L. Sprague de Camp, the second book of his Viagens Interplanetarias series and its subseries of stories set on the fictional planet Krishna. The book has a convoluted publication history.

It was first published in the magazine Astounding Science Fiction as a four-part serial in the issues for October, 1950-January 1951. The text was redivided into two parts for its first publication in book form by Avalon Books, appearing as the separate volumes The Search for Zei (1962) and The Hand of Zei (1963). To facilitate the new division, de Camp wrote a new ending for the first and a new beginning for the second to briefly recapitulate the portion of the story already told. The two parts were then reissued together in paperback by Ace Books in 1963, back to back and inverted in relationship to each other, as an "Ace Double". The Ace versions were slightly abridged by the author. The first half of the novel was published in the UK by Compact Books as The Floating Continent in 1966. A restored text bringing both segments back together was finally published by Owlswick Press in 1981. A new paperback edition utilizing this text was issued by Ace Books in August 1982 as part of the standard edition of the Krishna novels, and was reprinted in March 1983. A later paperback edition was issued by Baen Books in March 1990. An E-book edition was published by Gollancz's SF Gateway imprint on September 29, 2011 as part of a general release of de Camp's works in electronic form. The novel has been translated into Dutch, French, German and Czech.

As with all of the "Krishna" novels, the title of The Hand of Zei has a "Z" in it, a practice de Camp claimed to have devised to keep track of them. Short stories in the series do not follow the practice, nor do Viagens Interplanetarias works not set on Krishna.

== Plot summary ==
Travel writer Dirk Barnevelt and lecturer George Tangaloa, associates of interplanetary explorer and documentarian Igor Shtain, are drafted on Shtain's disappearance to complete his commission to explore the Sargasso Sea-like Sunqar area of Krishna's Banjao Sea — and incidentally to find Shtain, who is suspected to have been kidnapped to Krishna. Arriving on the planet, the Earthmen travel to their goal in disguise as native Krishnans; Barnevelt himself is given the alias of the famous general, Snyol of Plesht, from the Antarctic nation of Nichnyamadze (setting of the Krishnan short story "Calories"). Snyol's formidable reputation proves at various times both a boon and a hindrance to their mission.

The two are dogged at every step by pirates from the Sunqar who believe their true goal is to disrupt the pirates' smuggling operation. Complications arise when the two become embroiled in the affairs of the native monarchy of Qirib, whose princess Zei is kidnapped by the pirates. Dirk is ordered by Queen Alvandi to recover the princess while George remains behind as a hostage. Dirk must therefore take the lead in rescuing Zei, putting down the pirates, recovering Shtain, and settling the affairs of Alvandi's topsy-turvy kingdom, in which the women bear arms and the men languish in perfumed idleness.

To make matters worse, Dirk falls in love with Zei, an entanglement fraught with its own dangers and complications. Not only is she a princess, but as potential queen of Qirib she would have the responsibility of taking a new king-husband annually, ritually executing and feasting on each when his term as consort reaches its end. And even could that obstacle be overcome, as representatives of two different species Barnevelt and Zei supposedly could never be a true couple.

== Setting ==
The planet Krishna is de Camp's premier creation in the Sword and Planet genre, representing both a tribute to the Barsoom novels of Edgar Rice Burroughs and an attempt to "get it right", reconstructing the concept logically, without what he regarded as Burroughs' biological and technological absurdities. De Camp intended the stories as "pure entertainment in the form of light, humorous, swashbuckling, interplanetary adventure-romances - a sort of sophisticated Burroughs-type story, more carefully thought out than their prototypes."

As dated in the 1959 version of de Camp's essay "The Krishna Stories" and James Cambias's GURPS Planet Krishna (a 1997 gaming guide to the Viagens series authorized by de Camp), the main Krishnan events of The Hand of Zei take place in the year 2143 AD, falling between the second part of "Finished" and The Hostage of Zir, and making it the sixth story set on Krishna in terms of chronology. The introductory section of the story is set much earlier, on Earth in about 2132 AD, and the final scene is set slightly later, on Krishna in 2144 AD.

== Relationship to other works ==
Like the other early Krishna story "Calories", The Hand of Zei may have been influenced by the author's then recent collaboration with Finn Ronne on the non-fiction book Antarctic Conquest: the Story of the Ronne Expedition 1946-1948 (1949); the ghostwriter protagonist has a relationship to his explorer boss similar to the one de Camp had with Ronne, and adopts the alias of an inhabitant of Krishna's Antarctic region. Of all the Krishna stories only these two make use of the Antarctic setting.

== Reception ==
C. J. Henderson reviewed The Hand of Zei for Pegasus magazine and stated that "All in all, The Hand of Zei is a grand adventure and good fun woven together at a rapid pace. Like most of de Camp's work, it is well worth the effort of tracking it down."

Preceded by "Finished" (part 2)	Krishna tales of L. Sprague de Camp; The Hand of Zei	Succeeded by The Hostage of Zir
