= The Inspector's Teeth =

- Short story by L. Sprague de Camp
- Edd Cartier's illustration of the story in Astounding, Apr. 1950
- Country: United States
- Language: English
- Genre: Science fiction

Publication
- Published in: Astounding Science Fiction
- Media type: Print (Magazine)
- Publication date: April, 1950

Chronology
- Series: Viagens Interplanetarias
| — | The Colorful Character |

"The Inspector's Teeth" is a science fiction short story by American writer L. Sprague de Camp, part of his Viagens Interplanetarias series. It is the first (chronologically) set on Earth, and a linchpin tale in the sequence, showing how the interstellar political system forming the background of the rest of the series was established. It was first published in the magazine Astounding in the issue for April, 1950. It first appeared in book form in the collection The Continent Makers and Other Tales of the Viagens, published in hardcover by Twayne Publishers in 1953, and in paperback by Signet Books in 1971. It also appeared in The Best of L. Sprague de Camp, (Doubleday, 1978) and Anthropomorphic Aliens: An Interstellar Anthology (FurPlanet Productions, 2014). The story has been translated into Portuguese, Dutch, Italian and German.

== Plot summary ==
In the year 2088 CE. a negotiating team for the World Federation, World-Manager Chagas, First Assistant Wu and Minister of External Affairs Evans await the arrival of the Osirian ambassador to learn if he will accept their terms for a proposed interstellar treaty. Privately, they feel he is entitled to better terms, but if they offer them, the Althing or world parliament will not ratify the treaty. His decision will decide if there will be an Interplanetary Council to keep peace between star systems. Wu and Evans have an argument; Wu, of Marxist persuasions, feels the ambassador will choose on wholly rational grounds, while Evans, who regards the Osirians as sentimentalists, demurs. The ambassador duly arrives, and notes that his people will find some provisions of the proposed treaty objectionable, but rather than going over them, chooses to tell a story, which comprises the body of the narrative:

In 2054, in the early days of interstellar travel, Hithafea, a young Osirian, enrolls in Earth's Atlantic University and pledges the Iota Gamma Omicron fraternity. His Terran friend Herbert Lengyel successfully sponsors him over the protests of the snobbish John Fitzgerald. Hithafea accepts the bid, on the grounds that Lengyel was the first person on campus to treat him well, and that the early interstellar explorer de Câmara, founder of the Viagens Interplanetarias and the first Earthman to visit Osiris, had been an Iota.

In Hithafea's initiation Fitzgerald hazes him savagely, but is thwarted by the alien's strength, stamina and equanimity. Finally he suggests Hithafea be assigned the task of retrieving from the campus museum the false teeth of the Osirian Chief Inspector Ficèsaqha, brought back to Earth by de Câmara and donated to the college. Soon after, Hithafea's roommate Frank Hodiak is surprised to find the alien hurriedly packing to leave early for Christmas vacation, and is given the distinct impression he will not be coming back.

Subsequently, Fitzgerald is arrested for stealing the inspector's teeth from the museum, and Lengyel receives an explanatory note from the Iotas' missing pledge. Tempted by the notion of recovering the artifact de Camera had stolen from Osiris, Hithafea had hypnotized Fitzgerald to do the dirty work, and is now on his way home with the teeth. While regretting not being able to finish his studies or to become an Iota, he takes satisfaction in the honor his deed will receive on his home planet – not to mention getting even with Fitzgerald and helping out Lengyel by giving him "a clear field" with the bully's girl Alice Holm, whom he knows his friend admires. The ambassador's story within a story ends here.

Concluding, the ambassador, now revealed to the reader to be Hithafea himself, explains he is signing the treaty as it stands out of sentiment for the welcome extended him by Atlantic, the Iotas and Lengyel during his youth.

== Setting ==
"The Inspector's Teeth" is set on a future Earth governed by a World Federation in which Brazil has become the paramount great power, with Terran space travel monopolized by a Brazilian-dominated agency called the Viagens Interplanetarias ("Interplanetary Tours" in Portuguese). Interstellar travel is common between the Solar System and nearby stellar systems, though limited to sub-light speeds, as the author eschews such common science fiction gimmicks as hyperdrives. Most reachable systems have life-bearing planets inhabited by intelligent alien races; an Interplanetary Council regulates relations between the various civilizations. Terrans and the reptilian natives of the planet Osiris are the main spacefaring peoples.

In this early Viagens story, Earth is portrayed as already under the leadership of Brazilians in the wake of the exhaustion of the twentieth century's great powers. The dinosauroid Osirians are characterized as both sentimental and rapaciously capitalistic; they are also possessed of mind-controlling powers, generally referred to as "telepathic pseudohypnosis", against which other intelligent species must take special precautions. This talent was not fully recognized by Terrans at the time of Hithafea's original visit to Earth.

As dated in The Continent Makers and Other Tales of the Viagens and the 1959 version of de Camp's essay "The Krishna Stories", the framing sequence of "The Inspector's Teeth" takes place in the year 2088 CE., with the flashback main portion of the story taking place in 2054 CE., placing the story before "The Colorful Character" and making it the first Viagens story set on Earth in terms of chronology.
