= The Good Old Stuff =

Collection of science fiction short stories by Gardner Dozois

- Cover of first edition
- Editor: Gardner Dozois
- Cover artist: Ed Emshwiller
- Language: English
- Genre: Science fiction
- Publisher: St. Martin's Press
- Publication date: 1998
- Publication place: United States
- Media type: Print (paperback)
- Pages: xxv, 434 pp.
- ISBN: 0-312-19275-4
- Followed by: The Good New Stuff

The Good Old Stuff: Adventure SF in the Grand Tradition is an anthology of science fiction short stories edited by Gardner Dozois. It was first published in trade paperback by St. Martin's Griffin in December 1998, with an ebook following from the same publisher in December 2013. It was combined with its companion anthology The Good New Stuff in the omnibus edition The Good Stuff, issued by the Science Fiction Book Club in January 1999. It has also been translated into Italian.

== Summary ==
The book collects sixteen novellas, novelettes and short stories by various science fiction authors originally published from the late 1940s through the early 1970s, together with a preface by the editor.

== Contents ==
- "Preface" (Gardner Dozois)
- "The Rull" (A. E. van Vogt)
- "The Second Night of Summer" (James H. Schmitz)
- "The Galton Whistle" (L. Sprague de Camp)
- "The New Prime" (Jack Vance)
- "That Share of Glory" (C. M. Kornbluth)
- "The Last Days of Shandakor" (Leigh Brackett)
- "Exploration Team" (Murray Leinster)
- "The Sky People" (Poul Anderson)
- "The Man in the Mailbag" (Gordon R. Dickson)
- "Mother Hitton's Littul Kittons" (Cordwainer Smith)
- "A Kind of Artistry" (Brian W. Aldiss)
- "Gunpowder God" (H. Beam Piper)
- "Semley's Necklace" (Ursula K. Le Guin)
- "Moon Duel" (Fritz Leiber)
- "The Doors of His Face, the Lamps of His Mouth" (Roger Zelazny)
- "Mother in the Sky With Diamonds" (James Tiptree, Jr.)
