= Viagens Interplanetarias =

Sequence of science fiction stories by L. Sprague de Camp

The Continent Makers and Other Tales of the Viagens by L. Sprague de Camp, Twayne Publishers, 1953

The Viagens Interplanetarias series is a sequence of science fiction stories by L. Sprague de Camp, begun in the late 1940s and written under the influence of contemporary space opera and sword and planet stories, particularly Edgar Rice Burroughs's Martian novels. Set in the future in the 21st and 22nd centuries, the series is named for the quasi-public Terran agency portrayed as monopolizing interstellar travel, the Brazilian-dominated Viagens Interplanetarias ("Interplanetary Voyages" or "Interplanetary Tours" in Portuguese). It is also known as the Krishna series, as the majority of the stories belong to a sequence set on a fictional planet of that name. While de Camp started out as a science fiction writer and his early reputation was based on his short stories in the genre, the Viagens tales represent his only extended science fiction series.

The Viagens stories were written in two phases; the first, written between 1948 and 1953 and published between 1949 and 1958, was a burst of activity that produced the first four Krishna novels and most of the non-Krishna pieces, including all the short stories. The second, produced at a more deliberate pace from 1977–1992, comprised the remaining four Krishna novels and the two novels of the Kukulkan sequence. The early works established the setting of a cosmopolitan future interstellar civilization comprising both Terrans and a handful of other space-faring races who trade and squabble with each other while attempting to maintain a benign stewardship of the more primitive planetary societies with which they come into contact. The later works assumed but largely ignored this background, concentrating exclusively on the adventures of Terrans on the alien worlds of Krishna and Kukulkan.

== The setting ==
The Viagens universe is not a picturesque backdrop for heroics, like those of de Camp's predecessors Edgar Rice Burroughs and E. E. "Doc" Smith, nor is it a carefully constructed and recounted future history like those of contemporaries Robert A. Heinlein, Isaac Asimov and Poul Anderson. Most of the stories take place in the 22nd century, after an initial period of exploration and diplomacy establishing the ground rules for interstellar commerce and contact, but before the higher civilization of the space-faring cultures has completely transformed those of the more primitive, planet-bound races. Given de Camp's view of even the most intelligent of beings as subject to the dictates of their instincts, emotions and self-interest, the Viagens universe represents a workable but decidedly imperfect future.

Just as de Camp attempted to do in the fantasy genre with his Pusadian stories for the Hyborian Age tales of Robert E. Howard, the Viagens tales represent both a tribute to contemporary space opera and sword and planet fiction and an attempt to "get them right", reconstructing the premises logically, without what he regarded as their technological, biological and anthropological absurdities. De Camp intended the stories as "pure entertainment in the form of light, humorous, swashbuckling, interplanetary adventure-romances - a sort of sophisticated Burroughs-type story, more carefully thought out than their prototypes." Thus he discarded such impossible but commonplace notions such as interfertility of human beings with humanoid alien races, civilizations possessing flying machines but no ground transport, bladed weapons and advanced gunnery coexisting in the same society, and faster than light travel.

De Camp did, however, underestimate the staggering impediments to even sub-light interstellar travel, assuming it would both be achieved quickly and soon develop into a relatively routine and comfortable system of commerce and travel linking nearby star-systems, much as sailing ships linked the early modern nations of Earth. He also assumed the parallel and convergent evolution of life on other worlds into types of higher multicellular lifeforms similar to those of Earth, and the ubiquity of intelligent life; thus his alien planets have both animal and plant life, with at least one species of animal life usually having achieved intelligence, and these alien intelligent species are in the main recognizably mammalian or reptilian.

The constraints adopted have definite implications on the stories told. An Earthman may fall in love with and wed an alien princess like Burroughs' John Carter of Mars does, but unlike Carter will never be able to found a dynasty. Nor will he be able to flit from Earth to the stars and back; an interstellar voyage takes months of subjective time and many years in objective time - as dictated by the time dilation of the Theory of relativity - rendering any decision to leave his own stellar system a difficult one, fraught with the consequences of being cut off from his friends, family and native culture for decades, during which they will age or develop much more than he will himself. De Camp somewhat mitigates the problem by postulating the development of longevity treatments that extend human lifespans to two centuries. Nonetheless, the effect is that space travel primarily attracts marginal and unattached members of society such as adventurers, entrepreneurs, con-men, utopian idealists, emigrants, and various admixtures thereof – or official representatives such as explorers, diplomats, and bureaucrats. Sterling, selfless heroes are in short supply.

The relative isolation of each star system from the others effectively precludes interstellar warfare, and the practical limitation of even extended lifespans limits the area of effective routine contact to nearby star systems. Within this region an Interplanetary Council regulates relations between the various civilizations.

=== Star systems and planets ===
The main planets hosting intelligent life and their stars are Earth and Mars (Sol), Osiris, Isis and Thoth (Procyon), Krishna and Vishnu (Tau Ceti), Ormazd (Lalande 21185), and Kukulkan (Epsilon Eridani). These are the Terran designations; the local ones are rarely revealed. All are named for Terran gods because de Camp assumes that Terrans will have carried their penchant for naming planets after deities to other star systems, with each planetary system being named for a different pantheon – Egyptian for Procyon, Hindu for Tau Ceti, Persian for Lalande 21185, and Mesoamerican for Epsilon Eridani. (There is some confusion regarding the last of these; in addition to Kukulkan, another planet, Thor, is also stated to be a planet of Epsilon Eridani, though Thor belongs to a different pantheon from Kukulkan.) Some other planets are also occasionally mentioned in the series, and their inhabitants sometimes seen.

Terrans and the dinosaur-like natives of the planet Osiris are the main space-faring peoples; a third, the small, furry and bisexual natives of Thoth, a neighboring planet to Osiris, is dependent on Osirian technology. Pre-technological races include the humanoid inhabitants of Krishna and Ormazd, the ape-like and centaur-like inhabitants of Vishnu, and the multi-legged inhabitants of Thor. The dinosauroids of Kukulkan have steam-based technology.

Earth has Brazil as the most powerful nation after World War III greatly weakened the United States and destroyed the Soviet Union. Terran space travel is monopolized by the Brazilian-dominated Viagens Interplanetarias government agency. The planet is overpopulated and governed by a World Federation; Terrans have colonized Thor and Kukulkan, straining relations with the native inhabitants, and are responsible for maintaining a technological embargo against the primitive planets of Krishna and Vishnu in the Tau Ceti system.

Ganesha, in the same star system as Krishna, is occasionally described as inhabited, but its natives are otherwise never mentioned, and it is never visited in the series. In the short story "The Colorful Character," it is stated that no complete biological survey has ever been made of the planet.

Isis, in the same star system as Osiris, is inhabited by a trunked and multi-legged species described as resembling a cross between an elephant and a dachshund. Isidians are only occasionally encountered in the series.

Krishna, the setting for most of the stories, is a world similar to Earth, though its humanoid natives tend to be more impulsive and volatile. Their planet is drier than Earth, having no ocean or continents as such, but rather a worldwide landmass dotted with numerous seas and lakes. As a result, much of its area is composed of broad desert and steppe regions inhabited by nomads who periodically overwhelm and destroy the civilizations of the better-watered and more settled regions. Thus Krishnan civilization, while older than that of Earth by tens of thousands of years, has never progressed to a technological stage, having been forced to continually rebuild itself in the wake of repeated disasters. In the region of the Triple Seas, the planet's largest drainage area and the setting of all but one of the Krishna stories, the most recent disaster occurred over a thousand years prior to the contact era, when the Kalwmian Empire was destroyed and partially overrun by the Varastou people. At the time of the stories the Varastou nations themselves are similarly threatened by the nomads of Qaath. The presence of the Terrans with their superior technology complicates the situation. Despite the much-resented technological blockade, the local nations are beginning to develop their own technology after the Terran example, even as Terran culture undermines its customs and institutions. For instance, a railway network is slowly spreading around the Triple Seas, though the trains are pulled by elephantine local beasts rather than powered engines. The premier example of Krishnan adaptation is the island nation of Sotaspé, whose prince has established a patent system to encourage innovation.

Kukulkan is resource-poor, which along with the innate conservatism of its dinosauroid inhabitants inhibits its venerably ancient civilization from developing technologically. The natives do make limited use of steam power. It is partial colonized by Terrans, and there is periodic friction between the native states and Terran colonies.

Mars is a dry world with a thin atmosphere whose inhabitants, described as short and insect-like, are mentioned but not seen in the stories.

Ormazd is a world whose humanoid natives' unique biological traits have encouraged the development of hive societies similar to those of the social insects of Earth. Each is centered around a single ruling queen who alone can bear young, with a handful of males forming her harem and a host of sterile workers who make up the bulk of the population and perform all other societal roles. Contact with Terrans disrupts this system and leads to its overthrow.

Osiris is an arid world whose dinosauroid inhabitants are characterized as both sentimental and rapaciously capitalistic; they are also possessed of mind-controlling powers, generally referred to as "telepathic pseudohypnosis," against which other intelligent species must take special precautions.

Thor is another world subject to partial Terran colonization, which its bird-like natives resent and contest.

Thoth, in the same star system as Osiris, is a wet planet whose small, furry and bisexual natives are amoral and anarchic.

Vishnu, in the same star system as Krishna, is lush, tropical, and populated by two different intelligent species, both barbaric primitives in culture; the ape-like Romeli and the centaur-like Dzlieri.

== Stories ==
The Viagens tales have never been published together as a complete set. The shorter pieces were initially published in several science fiction magazines in the late 1940s and early 1950s, and first appeared in book form in the 1953 collections The Continent Makers and Other Tales of the Viagens and Sprague de Camp's New Anthology of Science Fiction (which also includes non-Viagens stories). The novels were issued at various times by various publishers; Ace Books brought out a standard edition of the first five Krishna novels in the early 1980s, later adding the sixth and seventh; the eighth, never part of this edition, was issued later by Baen Books.

De Camp's early short stories in the Viagens setting are mostly stand-alone tales. They establish the background, provide some hints of his future's back history, and give glimpses of the routine of interstellar space travel, typical characters engaging in it, and some of the intelligent alien races, and the worlds they inhabit. The longer tales are all adventures taking place on the planets themselves, with few passages set aboard spacecraft. They consist of a couple stand-alones set on Earth and Ormazd and two sequences of novels set on Krishna and Kukulkan.

=== Stand-alone tales ===
The stand-alone stories are typically set on spaceships traveling between star systems and on individual planets such as Earth, Vishnu and Osiris.

- "The Inspector's Teeth" (1950 short story - takes place on Earth in 2054 and 2088), chronologically the earliest in the fictional history, relates how the Interplanetary Council regulating relations between the various stellar systems is established, and, in flashback, the adventures of Hithafea, a young Osirian, as a fraternity pledge at Earth's Atlantic University.
- "Summer Wear" (1950 short story - takes place on Earth, in space, and on Osiris in 2104-2128) concerns a commercial space voyage from Earth to Osiris and back, in which clothing salesman Cato Chapman and the representative of a rival firm try to sell the nudist Osirians on Earth fashion. They return to discover that in their absence their industry has collapsed, Osirians having sold Terrans on Osirian body paint.
- "The Colorful Character" (1949 short story - takes place on Earth in 2117), another early tale, tells how biologist Gregory Lawrence helps thwart a plot by a Krishnan adventurer to kidnap Earth scientists and break the technological blockade of that primitive planet. The Krishnan events alluded to in this story antedate those of all the Krishnan tales.
- "The Galton Whistle" (1951 short story - takes place on Vishnu in 2117), in which surveyor Adrian Frome foils a madman's attempt to establish a personal empire among the primitive Dzlieri centauroids.
- "The Animal-Cracker Plot" (1949 short story - takes place on Vishnu in 2120) relates how customs agent Luther Beck defuses a potential war between the native Dzlieri and Romeli tribes fomented by the profiteering of con man Darius Koshay.
- "Git Along!" (1950 short story - takes place on Osiris in 2135-2148) tells of Darius Koshay's scheme to establish a dude ranch on Osiris, and how the enterprise miscarries.
- "The Continent Makers" (1951 novella - takes place on Earth in 2153), in which geophysicist Gordon Graham helps defeat a Thothian conspiracy to plant a colony on Earth, has the most extended vision of de Camp's future Earth and its dominant power, Brazil. The presence of two Krishnan expatriates dates this story after the establishment of diplomatic relations between Earth and the Krishnan island nation of Sotaspe resulting from the events of "Finished."
- Rogue Queen (1951 novel - takes place on Ormazd - date of action not established) tells of the second contact of the interstellar civilization with the newly discovered planet Ormazd from the point of view of native humanoid Iroedh, showing how her hive society is inadvertently but inevitably undermined and transformed by the advent of the Terrans. This, de Camp's most influential Viagens novel, was one of the earliest science fiction novels to deal with sexual themes.

=== Krishna tales ===
The seven novels and four short stories of the Krishna sequence follow various Earthmen and occasional other aliens in their encounters with the pretechnical local culture, in which their pursuit of their own often petty ends tend to have ramifications ranging from minor to history-changing on a society struggling to adapt to the more advanced civilization. The novels were written in two phases, the first four in the late 1940s and early 1950s, and the last four from the late 1970s through the early 1990s. The earlier series features different protagonists, and are unified primarily by their common setting and a number of recurring secondary characters, generally Viagens officials based at the Terran spaceport of Novorecife, but also a few important native Krishans. The later Krishna novels, some of which de Camp wrote in collaboration with his wife Catherine Crook de Camp, are interwoven with the earlier sequence chronologically. They concentrate primarily on two recurring protagonists, Terran tour guide Fergus Reith and his on-again, off-again lover, anthropologist Alicia Dyckman, usually relegating both major and minor returning characters from the previous sequence to secondary roles.

The titles of all of de Camp's Krishna novels and one of the novellas include a name beginning with "Z", a practice he claimed to have devised to keep track of them. He did not follow the practice for short stories set on Krishna.

- "Finished" (1949 short story - takes place in 2114 and 2140) unravels the scheme of Krishnan prince Ferrian of Sotaspe to smuggle Terran technical literature to Krishna, which fails of its specific end but succeeds in importing concepts that will inevitably promote Krishnan progress.
- "Perpetual Motion" (1950 novella - takes place in 2137) unveils the scheme of con-man Felix Borel to bilk the knight-rulers of a Krishnan republic by means of a rigged lottery and a phony perpetual motion machine.
- The Queen of Zamba (1949 novel - takes place in 2138) tells of how Canadian private investigator Victor Hasselborg trails a tycoon's daughter after she leaves Earth for Krishna in the company of English adventurer Anthony Fallon.
- "Calories" (1951 short story - takes place about 2139) details the escape of Earthmen Cuthwin Singer and Earl Okagamut from the fanatical theocrats of Nichnyamadze through the latter's knowledge of physiology.
- The Hand of Zei (1950 novel - takes place in 2132, 2143 and 2144) shows the adventures of copy-writer Dirk Barneveldt, would-be rescuer of a kidnapped explorer, as he finds he must clean out a nest of pirates, break up a drug trade that threatens Earth, and overthrow a matriarchy in order to achieve his goal.
- The Hostage of Zir (1977 novel - takes place about 2148) introduces tour guide Fergus Reith as an inexperienced, misfortune-plagued tyro leading his first tour of Krishna and inadvertently becoming entangled in Krishnan politics, first in a power-struggle between the bandit ruler and the religious leader of the restive province of Zir and afterwards in the machinations of the devious regent of the kingdom of Dur.
- The Prisoner of Zhamanak (1982 novel - takes place about 2149) relates the quest of Terran consul Percy Mjipa (first introduced in previously published but chronologically later The Tower of Zanid) to free the trouble-prone Alicia Dyckman from captivity in the hostile native kingdom of Zhamanak; Dyckman meets and becomes involved with Reith at the end of the story.
- "The Virgin of Zesh" (1953 novella - takes place in 2150) follows the flight of missionary Althea Merrick from an unwanted marriage to a colony of utopian expatriates, where she becomes embroiled in the affairs of some peculiarly intelligent aborigines.
- The Bones of Zora (1983 novel - takes place in 2151) reunites Fergus Reith and Alicia Dyckman, divorced after a disastrous marriage, as they find themselves assisting rival palaeontologists attempting to prove competing theories regarding the evolutionary past of Krishna.
- The Tower of Zanid (1958 novel - takes place in 2168) returns the spotlight to Anthony Fallon as he investigates the disappearance of a number of Terran scientists, helps an archaeologist penetrate the secrets of an ancient temple, and juggles dual roles as a member of the local civic guard and spy for the enemy horde of Qaathian nomads, all the while scheming to recover his lost throne. The book is notable for its favorable portrayal of an African character, omnicompetent Terran consul Percy Mjipa, at a time when most science fiction still depicted such characters rarely and stereotypically.
- The Swords of Zinjaban (1991 novel - takes place about 2171) again reunites Fergus Reith and Alicia Dyckman as liaisons for a Terran company hoping to film the first movie on the planet, first as guides helping the advance party scout locations, and then as advisers to the actual production. Complications turn up in the form of several of Reith's old flames and an invasion of the nomadic hordes of Qaath.

=== Kukulkan tales ===
Like the Krishna tales, the two books of the late Kukulkan sequence focus on the adventures of Terrans on a relatively primitive alien world, in this instance a somewhat more advanced planet ruled by a species of dinosaur-like creatures superficially similar to the Osirians. Earth has colonies on Kukulkan, leading to inevitable friction with the native inhabitants, and the protagonists must deal with threats from both cultures.

- The Stones of Nomuru (1988 novel - date of action not established) pits archaeologist Keith Salazar in defence of his dig against both the development plans of an avaricious fellow colonist and invasion by a Kukulkanian warlord.
- The Venom Trees of Sunga (1992 novel - date of action not established), set a generation later, follows Keith's son, biologist Kirk Salazar as he studies a local species and seeks to protect its habitat amid a struggle between a logging magnate and Terran cultists.

== Importance in the history of science fiction ==
The Viagens series is notable in the development of American science fiction of the 1950s for bringing a more realistic attitude to bear on some of the less credible features then commonplace to the genre, reimagining them in terms of the possible. It also leavened the hero-worship, sexism, prudery, ethnocentricity and nationalism then characteristic of the genre with a more skeptical view of human nature, strong characters of both genders (and of both same-sex and opposite-sex inclinations, though the latter predominate), for whom sex was a normal aspect of life, and an ethnically varied, international cast. De Camp's work helped prepare the field for the works of later, more iconoclastic writers, to the degree that when he returned to the series in the 1970s his own innovations had themselves come to appear routine and commonplace.

Rogue Queen in particular is important in the history of science fiction for breaking the genre's taboo on sexual themes, paving the way for more daring works by Philip José Farmer and others. Steven Silver speculated that "without Rogue Queen to lay the groundwork, it is possible that the anthropological science fiction of a later age, as well as its gender examinations, would not have occur[r]ed in the manner it did."

Additionally, Colleen Power has pointed out that "the overwhelming concern ... to prevent modern technological humans from influencing or interfering with the normal development of native cultures" in the Viagens novels "predat[es] 'Star Trek's' 'prime directive' by nearly twenty years."

== Reception ==
Critical response to the series has been mixed. Commenting on The Continent Makers and Other Tales of the Viagens, P. Schuyler Miller wrote "Here you will find entertainment, ideas skillfully played with, precise care for detail and consistency, but actually not too much plot-suspense. So logical is the development of most of the stories, that the experienced reader knows what must be coming next." Of the setting, he observed that it allowed "ample room for swashbuckling, skullduggery and horseplay, in which de Camp deals deftly from time to time," but noted that "[o]ut of this setting, on the other hand, has come just one really memorable book--'Rogue Queen.'"

In other reviews of the same collection, Mark Reinsberg wrote that "De Camp's style is adroit and witty as he develops science-fiction take-offs on themes like sea piracy, head hunters, the wild west, and jousting knight-hood," and noted that "[t]he tales are spiced with glamorous other worldly women." He also rated it "[p]robably the most entertaining collection of 'tomorrow tales' by an individual author" published in 1953, whose "yarns kept the reader laughing over space pioneering in the 22d century and a marvelous pair of interstellar swindlers named Koshay and Borel." The English Journal stated that "[f]or fantasy, irony, and imagination these stories are remarkable." The Los Angeles Times noted that in postulating the rise of Brazil as a world power, de Camp "develops an interesting and not too improbable theme."

On the other hand, Boucher and McComas felt "the stories of the Viagens Interplanetarias have usually struck us as pretty routine work unworthy of L. Sprague de Camp, but devotees of the series will welcome the collected volume." Groff Conklin assessed it as a "cream-puff-light book of space opera ... [f]ine stuff for bedtime, but I do feel that the stories were written with the left hind paw of an immensely brilliant fellow who just wasn't trying hard. Perhaps we should call it 'relentlessly light reading!'"

Early reviewers of the first Krishna novel, The Queen of Zamba, were mixedly impressed by the book. J. Francis McComas called it "a tedious account of a private eye's quest through space for a runaway heiress," with "[t]he chase ... a pretty drab affair, without the wit and charm usually found in this author's work." Groff Conklin characterized it as "a cops-and-robbers adventure," rating it "fast-moving and moderately sophisticated entertainment, bubble-light through not bubble-headed, and considerably below the author's best." Anthony Boucher described the novel as "a fairly primitive and predictable adventure story which is 'science fiction' because it is said to happen on the remote planet Krishna."

Later critics struck much the same note. William Mattathias Robins called it "a simple detective adventure in an exotic setting." Colleen Power wrote more charitably that "[w]hile the novel seems dated, with its tough-talking detective slang and philosophy, [its] satire combines nicely with comic swordplay to present the reader with a short, light science fiction detective novel." David Pringle characterized it as "[l]ight-hearted planetary romance -- or fantasy in an ostensibly science fictional setting."

Both Boucher and Robins note the novel's primacy in the Viagens series, suggesting they see its primary significance in the establishment of the setting.

Reviews of Rogue Queen were largely positive. Anthony Boucher praised de Camp for "producing a science-fiction narrative which is entirely about sex, and, surprisingly, non-pornographic," characterizing the narrative as "that rarest of collector's items: a completely new science-fiction plot." Later he and J. Francis McComas rated Rogue Queen as "[t]he most interesting recent fictional extrapolation," noting that "[l]ively and unusual thinking, a vigorous plot, and a most appealing non-human heroine make [it] the best de Camp novel in many years.". Groff Conklin described the novel as "without doubt the best item de Camp has yet developed out of his concept of Viagens Interplanetarias", lauding "[t]he meticulously scientific way in which de Camp develops details of this culture on a far-distant planet to parallel a bee society [as] fascinating," with "[t]he story of how this is accomplished ... made so circumstantially real, so humanly plausible, that the book becomes a sheer delight to read." P. Schuyler Miller also called the novel the series's "most handsome dividend," finding it "by long odds the best of the Viagens stories, worked out with the de Campian flair for meticulously ridiculous logic." The reviewer for Startling Stories characterized the book as "another in the same vein" in the author's "growing list of gentle satires," with "[t]he story ... relatively unimportant, ... there only as a vehicle for the author to ride in while he pokes fun at humans and their frailties." Villiers Gerson called it "an ingenious, amusing tale" in which "[t]hat clever science-fiction writer ... for once blended satisfactorily both gimmick and characterization."

Commenting on later novels in the series, Lester del Rey in Analog Science Fiction/Science Fact wrote of The Hostage of Zir that "[t]here's only one way to describe [the book]; it's a new Krishna novel. And like de Camp's other popular Krishna novels, it's a wry and wacky story of a human forced to contend with the semicivilized and semihuman cultures of an alien world where Murphy's law always holds good, and nothing ever goes according to plan. You could call it sword-and-sorcery, since swords are buckled with a touch of swash, and human science is a sort of magic to the too-human but egg-laying Krishnans. But the adventure is always cock-eyed." He concludes that "[i]f you've read and enjoyed the other stories of Krishna, you'll want this one. If you haven't read any, this is a good one to start with."

Don D'Ammassa, addressing it and other late entries in the Viagens series, writes "[t]he quality of the series remains undiminished in [these] volumes, which combine good-natured mayhem and a crisp, exciting narrative style.

== Bibliography ==
=== Stories ===
- Krishna
  - "Finished" [part 1] (1949)
  - "Perpetual Motion" (1950)
  - The Queen of Zamba (1949) [vt Cosmic Manhunt (1954)], ISBN 0-441-69658-9
  - "Calories" (1951)
  - "Finished" [part 2] (1949)
  - The Hand of Zei (1950), ISBN 0-671-69865-6
  - The Hostage of Zir (1977)
  - The Prisoner of Zhamanak (1982)
  - "The Virgin of Zesh" (1953), ISBN 0-441-86495-3
  - The Bones of Zora (1983) (with Catherine Crook de Camp)
  - The Tower of Zanid (1958), ISBN 0-441-86495-3
  - The Swords of Zinjaban (1991) (with Catherine Crook de Camp)
- Earth
  - "The Inspector's Teeth" (1950)
  - "The Colorful Character" (1949)
  - "The Continent Makers" (1951)
- Osiris
  - "Summer Wear" (1950)
  - "Git Along!" (1950)
- Vishnu
  - "The Galton Whistle" (1951)
  - "The Animal-Cracker Plot" (1949)
- Ormazd
  - Rogue Queen (1951)
- Kukulkan
  - The Stones of Nomuru (1988) (with Catherine Crook de Camp)
  - The Venom Trees of Sunga (1992)

=== Collected editions ===
- The Continent Makers and Other Tales of the Viagens (1953; includes "The Inspector's Teeth," "Summer Wear," "Finished," "The Galton Whistle," "The Animal-Cracker Plot," "Git Along!," "Perpetual Motion," and "The Continent Makers")
- Sprague de Camp's New Anthology of Science Fiction (1953; includes "Calories" and "The Colourful Character," along with non-Viagens stories)
- The Virgin of Zesh & The Tower of Zanid (1983; includes the title pieces)

=== About the series ===
- GURPS Planet Krishna, by James Cambias; edited by Sean Barrett. ISBN 1-55634-263-2
