= The Animal-Cracker Plot =

- Short story by L. Sprague de Camp
- Edd Cartier's illustration of the story in Astounding Science-Fiction, Jul. 1949
- Country: United States
- Language: English
- Genre: Science fiction

Publication
- Published in: Astounding Science-Fiction
- Media type: Print (Magazine)
- Publication date: July, 1949

Chronology
- Series: Viagens Interplanetarias
The Galton Whistle	Git Along!

"The Animal-Cracker Plot" is a science fiction short story by American writer L. Sprague de Camp, a story in his Viagens Interplanetarias series. It is the second (chronologically) set on the planet Vishnu, and the first to feature the interstellar con-man Darius Koshay. It was first published in the magazine Astounding Science-Fiction in the issue for July, 1949. It first appeared in book form in the collection The Continent Makers and Other Tales of the Viagens, published in hardcover by Twayne Publishers in 1953, and in paperback by Signet Books in 1971. The story has been translated into Portuguese, Dutch, and Italian.

== Plot summary ==
When Iranian con-man Darius Koshay lands on the planet Vishnu, customs agent Luther Beck, who has tangled with him before, does everything he can to find an excuse to detain him before he can cause more trouble. He can find nothing to pin on the slick Koshay, and is forced to allow him through customs. Koshay's ostensible object is to make and sell crackers to the planet's aborigines, of which he learned they were fond on a previous visit. Vishnu is host to two intelligent native species, the six-limbed, apelike Romeli and the centaurlike Dzlieri, who are mutually antagonistic. All too soon, Beck learns Koshay's scheme is far from innocent; he is playing the Romeli off against the Dzlieri by supplying each with crackers in the form of the other, convincing them the crackers will give them power over their enemies if consumed in conjunction with the proper voodoo-like rites. Beck undertakes to reveal to both alien races Koshay's double-dealing before his machinations can lead to a major war. Ultimately a wary truce is brokered between the two sides and Koshay, finding himself a marked man, finds it expedient to flee Vishnu.

== Setting ==
The planet Vishnu is a tropical world orbiting Tau Ceti in the same star system as Krishna, de Camp's primary setting for the Viagens Interplanetarias series.

As dated in The Continent Makers and Other Tales of the Viagens and the 1959 version of de Camp's essay "The Krishna Stories", the action of "The Animal-Cracker Plot" takes place in the year 2120 CE.

== Relation to other works ==
One of Koshay's later operations is the subject of the story "Git Along!" set on the planet Osiris.
