= The Galton Whistle =

- Short story by L. Sprague de Camp
- Illustration of the story in Future Combined with Science Fiction Stories, Jul. 1951
- Original title: Ultrasonic God
- Country: United States
- Language: English
- Genre: Science fiction

Publication
- Published in: Future Combined with Science Fiction Stories
- Media type: Print (Magazine)
- Publication date: July, 1951

Chronology
- Series: Viagens Interplanetarias
—	The Animal-Cracker Plot

"The Galton Whistle" is a science fiction short story by American writer L. Sprague de Camp, a story in his Viagens Interplanetarias series. It is the first (chronologically) set on the planet Vishnu. It was first published, as "Ultrasonic God," in the magazine Future Combined with Science Fiction Stories in the issue for July, 1951. It first appeared in book form under the present title (that preferred by the author) in the collection The Continent Makers and Other Tales of the Viagens, published in hardcover by Twayne Publishers in 1953, and in paperback by Signet Books in 1971. It also appeared in the anthologies Novelets of Science Fiction (Belmont Books, 1963, under the original title), The Good Old Stuff (St. Martin's Griffin, 1998), and The Good Stuff (Science Fiction Book Club, 1999). The story has been translated into Portuguese, Dutch, and Italian.

== Plot ==
Surveyor Adrian Frome, one of a three-member survey team working in the jungles of the planet Vishnu, is captured by the centaur-like Dzlieri natives after his supervisor is killed and the third member deserts. Taken to the Dzlieri base, he finds them taking orders from Sirat Mongkut, a Terran previously lost in the area, who is pretending to be a god and has ambitions of uniting the centauroid tribes under himself as emperor. He uses an ultrasonic whistle than only the Dzlieri can hear to bolster his authority. Another captive is Elena Millán, a female missionary who had also gone missing. Faced with the choice of joining his captor's cause or death, Frome pretends to enlist, while actually seeking an opportunity to thwart the madman's grandiose scheme and escape. When it arises, he kills Sirat and absconds with Elena, making for the peak that was the goal of the survey, from which he hopes to signal for aid. Successfully rescued, he puts in for a transfer to Ganesha, another world in the star system, to escape Elena in turn; having formed a romantic liaison with her, he has since discovered she is an incurable religious fanatic.

== Setting ==
The planet Vishnu is a tropical world orbiting Tau Ceti in the same star system as Krishna, de Camp's primary setting for the Viagens Interplanetarias series.

As dated in The Continent Makers and Other Tales of the Viagens and the 1959 version of de Camp's essay "The Krishna Stories", "The Galton Whistle" takes place in the year 2117 CE.
