= Perpetual Motion (novella) =

- Short story by L. Sprague de Camp
- Original title: Wide-Open Planet
- Country: United States
- Language: English
- Genre: Science fiction

Publication
- Published in: Future Combined with Science Fiction Stories
- Media type: Print (Magazine)
- Publication date: September–October, 1950

Chronology
- Series: Viagens Interplanetarias
Finished	The Queen of Zamba

"Perpetual Motion" is a science fiction short story by American writer L. Sprague de Camp, part of his Viagens Interplanetarias series. It was first published under the title "Wide-Open Planet" in the magazine Future Combined with Science Fiction Stories in the issue for September–October, 1950. It first appeared in book form under the present title in the collection The Continent Makers and Other Tales of the Viagens, published in hardcover by Twayne Publishers in 1953, and in paperback by Signet Books in 1971. It was also included in the paperback edition of The Queen of Zamba published by Dale Books in 1977. This edition was reprinted by Ace Books in 1982 as part of the standard edition of the Krishna novels. A trade paperback edition in which the story was paired with Richard Wilson's "And Then The Town Took Off" was issued by Armchair Fiction in May, 2013 as Wide-Open Planet & And Then The Town Took Off. The story has been translated into Portuguese, Dutch, and Italian.

== Plot summary ==
When French con-man Felix Borel lands on the planet Krishna, he expects to take the native rubes for everything they've got. Targeting the Republic of Mikardand he establishes himself in the capital, Mishe. There he quickly ingratiates himself with the ruling class, the knightly Order of Qarar, and enmeshes the knights in a scheme to establish a lottery and peddle a perpetual motion machine that he pretends will enable the Krishnans to catch up to the technologically superior Terrans by supplying them with limitless power.

All is going as planned until the knight Shurgez, former paramour of Zerdai, a female member of the order Borel has taken up with, returns from a quest and challenges him to a duel over her. Borel pretends to agree, but knowing himself no match for a trained warrior prepares for a quick getaway, which he effects on the very occasion of the duel itself. Fleeing through the Koloft Swamp on a swift aya with as much of his ill-gotten gains as he could stow, he is attacked by the tailed aborigines dwelling there and forced to abandon his treasure to save his life.

To add insult to injury, Borel is arrested back at the Terran spaceport of Novorecife on the charge of divulging Terran technology to the Krishnans. He gets off by pointing out that his device was plainly fraudulent, perpetual motion being a physical impossibility. As Novorecife has no extradition treaty with Mikardand, the authorities are forced to let him go, and soon Borel is working a new con on a visiting Viagens Interplanetarias bigwig, who is interested in touring the native kingdoms and is looking for a guide... As Judge Keshavachandra ruefully noted after the conclusion of Borel's trial: "Talk of perpetual motion, he's it!"

The fates of Borel's new scheme and of Borel himself are revealed in the later Krishna novel The Hostage of Zir. That novel also shows the beginning of the organized tourism on Krishna Borel envisioned, though without his involvement.

== Setting ==
The planet Krishna is de Camp's premier creation in the Sword and Planet genre, representing both a tribute to the Barsoom novels of Edgar Rice Burroughs and an attempt to "get it right", reconstructing the concept logically and thoughtfully, without what he regarded as Burroughs' biological and technological absurdities. De Camp intended the stories as "pure entertainment in the form of light, humorous, swashbuckling, interplanetary adventure-romances - a sort of sophisticated Burroughs-type story, more carefully thought out than their prototypes."

As dated in The Continent Makers and Other Tales of the Viagens, the 1959 version of de Camp's essay "The Krishna Stories," and James Cambias's GURPS Planet Krishna (a 1997 gaming guide to the Viagens series authorized by de Camp), the action of "Perpetual Motion" takes place in the year 2137 AD., falling between the first part of "Finished" and The Queen of Zamba, and making it the second story set on Krishna in terms of chronology.

== Notes ==
Preceded by "Finished" (part 1)	Krishna tales of L. Sprague de Camp "Perpetual Motion"	Succeeded by The Queen of Zamba
