= The Good New Stuff =

Science fiction short story anthology

- Cover of first edition
- Author: Gardner Dozois (editor)
- Cover artist: Bob Eggleton
- Language: English
- Genre: Science fiction
- Publisher: St. Martin's Press
- Publication date: 1999
- Publication place: United States
- Media type: Print (paperback)
- Pages: 450 pp.
- ISBN: 0-312-19890-6
- Preceded by: The Good Old Stuff

The Good New Stuff: Adventure SF in the Grand Tradition is an anthology of science fiction short works edited by American writers Gardner Dozois. It was first published in trade paperback by St. Martin's Griffin in February 1999, with an ebook following from the same publisher in August 2002. It was combined with its companion anthology The Good Old Stuff in the omnibus edition The Good Stuff, issued by the Science Fiction Book Club in January 1999.

== Summary ==
The book collects seventeen novellas, novelettes and short stories by various science fiction authors originally published from the late 1970s through the late 1990s, together with a preface by the editor.

== Contents ==
- "Good-Bye, Robinson Crusoe" (John Varley)
- "The Way of Cross and Dragon" (George R. R. Martin)
- "Swarm" (Bruce Sterling)
- "The Blind Minotaur" (Michael Swanwick)
- "The Blabber" (Vernor Vinge)
- "The Return of the Kangaroo Rex" (Janet Kagan)
- "Prayers on the Wind" (Walter Jon Williams)
- "The Missionary's Child" (Maureen F. McHugh)
- "Poles Apart" (G. David Nordley)
- "Guest of Honor" (Robert Reed)
- "Flowering Mandrake" (George Turner)
- "Cilia-of-Gold" (Stephen Baxter)
- "Gone to Glory" (R. Garcia y Robertson)
- "A Dry, Quiet War" (Tony Daniel)
- "All Tomorrow's Parties" (Paul J. McAuley)
- "Escape Route" (Peter F. Hamilton)
- "The Eye of God" (Mary Rosenblum)
