= The Saxon Pretender =

- Short story by L. Sprague de Camp
- Illustration of the story in Science Fiction Quarterly
- Country: United States
- Language: English
- Genre: Science fiction

Publication
- Published in: Science Fiction Quarterly
- Publisher: Columbia Publications, Inc.
- Media type: Print (Magazine)
- Publication date: February 1952

"The Saxon Pretender" is a science fiction short story by L. Sprague de Camp. It was first published under the title "Rogue Princess" in the magazine Science Fiction Quarterly for February, 1952. It first appeared in book form under the author's preferred title of "The Saxon Pretender" in the collection Sprague de Camp's New Anthology of Science Fiction (Hamilton, 1953).

== Plot summary ==
In a future in which monarchy has made a comeback (even the United States has an elective king), Hollywood actor Claude Godwin has become bored with his career. Wandering along the California coast with a friend, he encounters a nude woman who has fallen asleep sunbathing on a secluded beach, On a whim, the two play a practical joke, photographing an equally nude Claude beside her with her own camera. When she wakes and has her pictures developed, they figure she will be in for a rude surprise.

The joke proves to be on Claude when some time later he is kidnapped to Greenland. The sleeping woman, it transpires, is that nation's Crown Princess Karen, in California incognito while attending college. As she sent her film home to be developed, Claude's private joke has blown up into a major scandal, and the straitlaced Greenlanders are not amused. By order of the dictatorial prime minister Anker Gram, he is to wed the recalled Princess Karen forthwith! Moreover, Claude finds himself a pawn in a scheme by Gram to bring about a union of Greenland with Great Britain. By means of a newly invented device that can peer into the past, it has been determined that Claude is the legitimate descendant and heir of Harold Godwinson, the last Saxon king of England, who had been overthrown by William the Conqueror at the Battle of Hastings in 1066. He thus has a claim to the British throne antedating that of all subsequent holders.

Claude quickly discovers himself enmeshed in a tangled web of conspiracies involving Gram's power-play, with various parties seeking to contact and enlist him to their sides be means of recorded message capsules smuggled to him inside gumdrops. Some of them have more malevolent intentions; there is one attempt to murder him with a poisoned gumdrop (it sickens one of his police guards instead), and another to have him destroy the temporal viewer with an explosive candy bar (suspicious on account of the assassination attempt, he throws it into the sea instead). As events progress, he finds himself allied with Princess Karen to forestall their forced marriage, Greenland's King Edvard III, who hopes Claude can help him exchange his throne for a movie career, and Viggo and Karl Bruun, inventors of the temporal viewer, who want their device used for historical research rather than political machinations. In opposition are Werner von Wittelsbach, the Jacobite pretender to the British throne who is living in exile in Greenland, and Thor Thomsen, a corrupt businessman backing Gram who fears the Bruuns' machine will expose his criminal dealings. But as long as Claude remains captive to Gram, the prime minister holds all the cards.

Things come to a head at the betrothal dinner held for Claude and Karen, at which everyone gets plastered. In the aftermath, Wittelsbach takes advantage of the drunkenness of Claude's guard to challenge the captive actor to a sword duel. The guard is injured trying to intervene, which lets Claude get the upper hand. With the others unconscious, he gets himself free of his restraining device, links up with the royals and the Bruuns, and with them commandeer a helicopter in which to make a break for Canada with the temporal viewer. Thomsen and Wittelsbach soon follow in a plane and force them down in Labrador. The villains smash the machine and prepare to murder Claude and the Bruuns, but the tables are turned when King Edvard manages to shoot Wittelsbach and get the drop on Thomsen.

Later, back in California, ex-King Edvard is happy at having landed a bit part in a movie thanks to Claude's influence, the Bruuns are restoring their machine, and Claude and Karen, their former aversion to being forced to wed notwithstanding, are dating. Claude has also learned that he is not after all the last heir of Harold Godwinson and the Saxon claim to the British throne; while the temporal viewer is real, that bit of data had been faked by Gram.

== Setting ==
Through information revealed in the course of the story, the author builds up an elaborate and detailed future. Not only has it seen a general rebirth of monarchy, but an engineered global warming in which Greenland's icecap has been purposely melted, allowing it to become a modernized and populous nation. De Camp presents various fictional advances in technology as commonplace while failing to foresee other real-world changes taking place after the story was written (like digital photography), resulting in a world present-day readers may find at once both futuristic and old-fashioned. In one mis-prediction, de Camp projects California becoming the most populous state in the US in 1990, a status it actually achieved in 1962.

== Reception ==
Anthony Boucher characterized the story along with the others collected in Sprague de Camp's New Anthology of Science Fiction as "a drab assemblage of unfunny humor and (what is even less forgivable) unsexy sex."
