= The Colorful Character =

Short story by Lyon Sprague de Camp

- Short story by L. Sprague de Camp
- Virgil Finlay's illustration of the story in Thrilling Wonder Stories, Dec. 1949
- Country: United States
- Language: English
- Genre: Science fiction

Publication
- Published in: Thrilling Wonder Stories
- Publisher: Standard Magazines
- Media type: Print (Magazine)
- Publication date: December, 1949

Chronology
- Series: Viagens Interplanetarias
The Inspector's Teeth	The Continent Makers

"The Colorful Character" is a science fiction short story by American writer L. Sprague de Camp, part of his Viagens Interplanetarias series. It was first published in the magazine Thrilling Wonder Stories in the issue for December, 1949. It first appeared in book form in the collection Sprague de Camp's New Anthology of Science Fiction, published simultaneously in hardcover by Hamilton and in paperback by Panther Books in 1953.

== Plot summary ==
Gregory Lawrence, an ordinary, undistinguished scientist, is dismayed to learn that the famous interplanetary explorer Sir Erik Koskelainen has returned to Earth from the planet Krishna in the Tau Ceti star system, and is to stay with the family of Lícia Ferreira, the girl he has been courting. He is convinced that she will lose all interest in him and be smitten by the glamorous star traveler. He is quickly proven correct in his concern; he finds that he himself is not immune to the man's charm, and the whole membership of the Institute of Advanced Study he works for is bowled over as well. The Institute quickly falls in with Koskelainen's proposal to enlist it in a complete biological survey of Krishna's neighboring planet Ganesha, which has never previously been attempted.

Only Reginald Schmidt, Lawrence's own supervisor, remains unconverted, recruiting him in a scheme to overturn the interloper's influence. Critical to the plot is Magramen the Dzleri, a centauroid native of Vishnu, another planet in the Tau Ceti system. At a general gathering of the scientists of the institute, the Vishnuvian, an acquaintance of the explorer, confronts and exposes him as Chabarian bad-Seraz, a humanoid alien from Krishna in disguise; Lawrence, riding on Magramen's back, then overtakes and captures the fleeing imposter. His heroism fails to impress Lícia however, who was thoroughly taken in by the alien and is angry at Lawrence for overturning her romantic illusions.

It turns out the whole charade was a plot on behalf of the Krishnan kingdom of Balhib to break the Terran ban on high technology to that primitive world. Schmidt knew this because he himself is the real Erik Koskelainen, on Earth incognito for rest and relaxation in the wake of his interplanetary excursions.

== Setting ==
"The Colorful Character" is set on a future Earth governed by a World Federation in which Brazil has become the paramount great power, with Terran space travel monopolized by a Brazilian-dominated agency called the Viagens Interplanetarias ("Interplanetary Tours" in Portuguese). Interstellar travel between the Solar System and nearby stellar systems is frequent, though limited to sub-light speeds, as the author eschews such common science fiction gimmicks as hyperdrives. Most reachable systems have life-bearing planets inhabited by alien races; an Interplanetary Council regulates relations between the various civilizations. Terrans and the reptilian natives of the planet Osiris are the main spacefaring peoples.

The antagonist's native kingdom of Balhib on Krishna is the setting for de Camp's later Krishna novel The Tower of Zanid. Another alien resident at the institute, an unnamed member of Krishna's other intelligent race, the tailed and less human-like Koloftuma, may be Yuruzh, the hero of de Camp's later Krishna story The Virgin of Zesh; Yuruzh reveals in the tale that he was taken to Earth and was a subject of scientific experimentation in his youth.

As dated in the 1959 version of de Camp's essay "The Krishna Stories", the action of "The Colorful Character" takes place in AD 2117, falling between "The Inspector's Teeth" and The Continent Makers, and making it the second Viagens story set on Earth in terms of chronology.

== Sources ==
- De Camp, L. Sprague. "The Krishna Stories " (Essay, in New Frontiers, v. 1, no. 1, Dec. 1959, page 6)
- Laughlin, Charlotte; Daniel J. H. Levack (1983). De Camp: An L. Sprague de Camp Bibliography. San Francisco: Underwood/Miller. pp. 92–93.
