= The Queen of Zamba =

1949 novel by Lyon Sprague de Camp

- Cover of the first edition with the author's preferred title and text
- Author: L. Sprague de Camp
- Illustrator: Jack Gaughan
- Cover artist: Jack Gaughan
- Language: English
- Series: Krishna
- Genre: Science fiction
- Publisher: Dale Books
- Publication date: 1977
- Publication place: United States
- Media type: Print (paperback)
- Pages: vi, 224
- ISBN: 0-89559-006-9
- OCLC: 3568098
- Preceded by: Perpetual Motion
- Followed by: Calories

The Queen of Zamba is a science fiction novel by American writer L. Sprague de Camp, the first book of his Viagens Interplanetarias series and its subseries of stories set on the fictional planet Krishna. It was written between November 1948 and January 1949 and first published in the magazine Astounding Science Fiction as a two-part serial in the issues for August and September 1949. It was first published in book form as a paperback by Ace Books in 1954 as an "Ace Double" issued back-to-back with Clifford D. Simak's novel Ring Around the Sun. This version was editorially retitled Cosmic Manhunt and introduced a number of textual changes disapproved by the author. The novel was first issued by itself in another paperback edition under the title A Planet Called Krishna, published in England by Compact Books in 1966. A new paperback edition restoring the author's preferred title and text and including the Krishna short story "Perpetual Motion" was published by Dale Books in 1977. This edition was reprinted by Ace Books in 1982 as part of the standard edition of the Krishna novels. The novel has been translated into German, French, Italian, Czech, and Polish. An E-book edition was published by Gollancz's SF Gateway imprint on September 29, 2011 as part of a general release of de Camp's works in electronic form.

As with all of the "Krishna" novels, the title of The Queen of Zamba has a "Z" in it, a practice de Camp claimed to have devised to keep track of them. Short stories in the series do not follow the practice, nor do Viagens Interplanetarias works not set on Krishna.

First book publication of The Queen of Zamba as Cosmic Manhunt with altered text, Ace Books, 1954.

== Plot summary ==
Victor Hasselborg, a 22nd-century private eye, is hired by a Syrian businessman to track down his missing daughter Julnar Batruni, who it turns out has run off with adventurer Anthony Fallon. Immediate complications ensue when Hasselborg finds himself falling for Alexandra, Fallon's abandoned wife. Discovering that the fugitives have gone off-planet, he tracks them to the planet Krishna, an Earth-like world of the star Tau Ceti with humanoid inhabitants but a medieval culture. Disguising himself as a native Krishnan, Hasselborg goes after them, little-knowing he has entered a web of interplanetary intrigue, spying, and gun-running...

Anthony Fallon, the antagonist in The Queen of Zamba, would reappear in two later Krishna novels; as the protagonist of The Tower of Zanid and as a minor character in The Swords of Zinjaban.

== Setting ==
The planet Krishna is de Camp's premier creation in the Sword and Planet genre, representing both a tribute to the Barsoom novels of Edgar Rice Burroughs and an attempt to "get it right", reconstructing the concept logically, without what he regarded as Burroughs' biological and technological absurdities. De Camp intended the stories as "pure entertainment in the form of light, humorous, swashbuckling, interplanetary adventure-romances - a sort of sophisticated Burroughs-type story, more carefully thought out than their prototypes."

As dated in the 1959 version of de Camp's essay "The Krishna Stories" and James Cambias's GURPS Planet Krishna (a 1997 gaming guide to the Viagens series authorized by de Camp), the Krishnan events of "The Queen of Zamba" take place in the year 2138, falling between "Perpetual Motion" and "Calories", and making it the third story set on Krishna in terms of chronology. The primary portion of the story is preceded and followed by scenes on Earth, each of which is over a decade removed from the main action.

== Reception ==
Early reviewers of the Ace edition were not terribly impressed by the book. J. Francis McComas called it "a tedious account of a private eye's quest through space for a runaway heiress," with "[t]he chase ... a pretty drab affair, without the wit and charm usually found in this author's work." Groff Conklin characterized it as "a cops-and-robbers adventure," rating it "fast-moving and moderately sophisticated entertainment, bubble-light though not bubble-headed, and considerably below the author's best." Anthony Boucher described the novel as "a fairly primitive and predictable adventure story which is 'science fiction' because it is said to happen on the remote planet Krishna."

More recent critics have struck much the same note. William Mattathias Robins called it "a simple detective adventure in an exotic setting." Colleen Power wrote more charitably that "[w]hile the novel seems dated, with its tough-talking detective slang and philosophy, [its] satire combines nicely with comic swordplay to present the reader with a short, light science fiction detective novel." She also pointed out that "the overwhelming concern ... to prevent modern technological humans from influencing or interfering with the normal development of native cultures" in it and the other Viagens novels "predat[es] 'Star Trek's' 'prime directive' by nearly twenty years." David Pringle characterized it as "[l]ight-hearted planetary romance -- or fantasy in an ostensibly science fictional setting."

Both Boucher and Robins note the novel's primacy in the Viagens series, suggesting they see its primary significance in the establishment of the setting.

== Notes ==
Preceded by "Perpetual Motion"	Krishna tales of L. Sprague de Camp; The Queen of Zamba	Succeeded by "Calories"
