= The Continent Makers and Other Tales of the Viagens =

1953 collection of stories by L. Sprague de Camp

- dust-jacket for the first edition of The Continent Makers and Other Tales of the Viagens
- Author: L. Sprague de Camp
- Cover artist: Herbtsmann
- Language: English
- Series: Viagens Interplanetarias
- Genre: Science fiction
- Publisher: Twayne Publishers
- Publication date: 1953
- Publication place: United States
- Media type: Print (hardback)
- Pages: xi, 272
- OCLC: 00490130
- LC Class: PZ3.D3555

The Continent Makers and Other Tales of the Viagens is a 1953 collection of science fiction stories by American writer L. Sprague de Camp, the fifth book in his Viagens Interplanetarias series. It was first published in hardcover by Twayne Publishers, and in paperback by Signet Books in 1971 with a cover by illustrator Bob Pepper. An E-book edition was published by Gollancz's SF Gateway imprint on September 29, 2011 as part of a general release of de Camp's works in electronic form. It has also been translated into Portuguese, Dutch, and Italian. The pieces were originally published between 1949 and 1951 in the magazines Astounding Science-Fiction, Startling Stories, Future Combined with Science Fiction, and Thrilling Wonder Stories.

The book is a collection of most of de Camp's early "Viagens Interplanetarias" tales, all of which are set in a future in which interstellar travel between the Solar System and nearby stellar systems inhabited by alien races is common, and an Interplanetary Council regulates relations between the various civilizations. Terrans and the reptilian natives of the planet Osiris are the main spacefaring peoples. The tales take place in the period from the mid-21st-century to the mid-twenty-second. Individual stories are set on spaceships traveling between planets and individual planets such as Earth, Krishna, Ganesha and Osiris (it being assumed that Terrans will have carried their penchant for naming planets after gods to other star systems).

Features of the postulated future include an Earth governed by a World Federation in which Brazil has become the paramount great power, with Terran space travel monopolized by a Brazilian-dominated agency called the Viagens Interplanetarias ("Interplanetary Tours" in Portuguese). Interstellar travel is limited to sub-light speeds, as the author eschews such common science fiction gimmicks as hyperdrives.

== Contents ==
The date headings to the individual stories are as listed in the collection's table of contents and at the beginning of each story.

- "In Re Sprague" by Isaac Asimov (introduction)
- "Author's Note"
- A.D. 2054-2088: "The Inspector's Teeth"
- A.D. 2104-2128: "Summer Wear"
- A.D. 2114-2140: "Finished"
- A.D. 2117: "The Galton Whistle"
- A.D. 2120: "The Animal-Cracker Plot"
- A.D. 2135-2148: "Git Along!"
- A.D. 2137: "Perpetual Motion"
- A.D. 2153: "The Continent Makers"

== Reception ==
Critical response to the book was mixed. The most extensive examination of the book came from P. Schuyler Miller, who wrote "Here you will find entertainment, ideas skillfully played with, precise care for detail and consistency, but actually not too much plot-suspense. So logical is the development of most of the stories, that the experienced reader knows what must be coming next." Of the setting, he observed that it allowed "ample room for swashbuckling, skullduggery and horseplay, in which de Camp deals deftly from time to time," but noted that "[o]ut of this setting, on the other hand, has come just one really memorable book--'Rogue Queen.'" Mark Reinsberg wrote that "De Camp's style is adroit and witty as he develops science-fiction take-offs on themes like sea piracy, head hunters, the wild west, and jousting knight-hood," and noted that "[t]he tales are spiced with glamorous other worldly women." He also rated it "[p]robably the most entertaining collection of 'tomorrow tales' by an individual author" published in 1953, whose "yarns kept the reader laughing over space pioneering in the 22d century and a marvelous pair of interstellar swindlers named Koshay and Borel." The English Journal stated that "[f]or fantasy, irony, and imagination these stories are remarkable." The Los Angeles Times noted that in postulating the rise of Brazil as a world power, de Camp "develops an interesting and not too improbable theme."

On the other hand, Boucher and McComas felt "the stories of the Viagens Interplanetarias have usually struck us as pretty routine work unworthy of L. Sprague de Camp, but devotees of the series will welcome the collected volume." Groff Conklin assessed it as a "cream-puff-light book of space opera ... [f]ine stuff for bedtime, but I do feel that the stories were written with the left hind paw of an immensely brilliant fellow who just wasn't trying hard. Perhaps we should call it 'relentlessly light reading!'"
