= The Continent Makers =

1951 novella by Lyon Sprague de Camp

- Cover of the April, 1951 issue of Thrilling Wonder Stories, illustrating The Continent Makers
- Author: L. Sprague de Camp
- Language: English
- Series: Viagens Interplanetarias
- Genre: Science fiction
- Publisher: Thrilling Wonder Stories
- Publication date: April, 1951
- Publication place: United States
- Media type: Print (magazine)
- Preceded by: The Colorful Character

The Continent Makers is a science fiction novella by American writer L. Sprague de Camp, part of his Viagens Interplanetarias series. It was first published in the magazine Thrilling Wonder Stories in the issue for April, 1951. It first appeared in book form in the collection The Continent Makers and Other Tales of the Viagens, published in hardcover by Twayne Publishers in 1953, and in paperback by Signet Books in 1971. It has also been translated into Portuguese, Dutch, and Italian.

== Plot summary ==
Geophysicist Gordon Graham is a participant in the Gamanovia Project, whose mission is to increase the land area of the overpopulated twenty-second century Earth by creating new continents through the manipulation of geological forces. The project's initial goal is to raise a new land mass to be called Gamanovia around the existing Ascension Island in the South Atlantic. The name of the proposed new continent was chosen to honor fifteenth century Portuguese navigator Vasco da Gama, the first European to navigate the region's waters, and for João da Nova, who discovered Ascension Island a few years later.

A sinister group concealing itself under the mask of the bogus Churchillian Society, supposedly dedicated to proving that the works of twentieth-century dramatist George Bernard Shaw were actually written by Winston Churchill, is attempting to discover the secrets of the project. The Churchillian Society's "cover" purpose is a spoof on the present-day body of thought similarly dismissing William Shakespeare's authorship of the Shakespeare plays on the grounds that he, as a commoner, could not possibly have written great literature.

When Graham becomes involved with Jeru-Bhetiru, an alien woman from the country of Katai-Jhogorai on the planet Krishna, the society attempts to blackmail him into serving them by kidnapping and threatening to kill her. Instead, Graham allies himself with World Federation constable Reinhold Sklar and Jeru's fiancé Varnipaz bad-Savarun, a diplomat from the Krishnan kingdom of Sotaspé, to thwart the plotters.

The enemy is gradually revealed as a rogue band of Thothians from the Procyonic star system, hoping to seize the new continent by claiming Ascension, which currently lacks any sovereign government. Graham and his cohorts find themselves in a tight race against time, in which the labyrinthine bureaucracies of the future Earth prove almost as much an impediment as the enemy, and the hypnotic powers of the reptilian alien Osirians bring about treachery within their own ranks.

An added problem for Graham is that the rescue of Jeru will gain nothing for him personally, but rather benefit only his rival Varnipaz; though Graham and Jeru love each other, people in her country wed on the basis of interest and advantage, considering love to have nothing to do with marriage.

== Setting ==
"The Continent Makers" is set on a future Earth governed by a World Federation in which Brazil has become the paramount great power, with Terran space travel monopolized by a Brazilian-dominated agency called the Viagens Interplanetarias ("Interplanetary Tours" in Portuguese). Interstellar travel is between the Solar System and nearby stellar systems is common, though limited to sub-light speeds, as the author eschews such common science fiction gimmicks as hyperdrives. Most reachable systems have life-bearing planets inhabited by alien races; an Interplanetary Council regulates relations between the various civilizations. Terrans and the reptilian natives of the planet Osiris are the main spacefaring peoples.

As dated in The Continent Makers and Other Tales of the Viagens and the 1959 version of de Camp's essay "The Krishna Stories," the action of "The Continent Makers" takes place in the year 2153 AD., placing it after "The Colorful Character", and making it the third Viagens story set on Earth in terms of chronology.

== Reception ==
P. Schuyler Miller, in a review of the collection, observed that the reader "may feel cheated to find that the title story, worth about one quarter of the book, takes place back on Earth," though finding its "various aliens" and "grand climax" worthy of comment.
