= GURPS Planet Krishna =

Tabletop role-playing game supplement for GURPS

From the classic Viagens books by L. Sprague de Camp; Swashbuckling Adventure in Space
- Cover art by Kelly Freas
- Designers: James Cambias
- Publishers: Steve Jackson Games
- Publication: 1997; 29 years ago
- Genres: Science fiction
- Systems: GURPS

GURPS Planet Krishna is a role-playing game supplement written by James Cambias, and published in 1997 by Steve Jackson Games for GURPS (Generic Universal Role-Playing System). It is a campaign sourcebook for L. Sprague de Camp's Viagens Interplanetarias science fiction setting.

== Contents ==
In 1949, L. Sprague de Camp published the "sword and planet" science fiction novel The Queen of Zamba in Astounding Science Fiction that was set on the alien planet Krishna, where all post-feudal technology is banned. Over the next 40 years, de Camp wrote a series of over 20 novels and short stories using the same setting that became known as the Viagens Interplanetarias series after a human interplanetary trading company of that name. GURPS Planet Krishna, subtitled "Swashbuckling Adventure in Space", is a supplement that describes the Viagens Interplanetarias setting, enabling a gamemaster to design a swashbuckling GURPS campaign set on Krishna. The book starts by covering interplanetary political and trade organizations and locations. The main focus of the book is the world of Krishna, and information includes geography, technology, laws, climate, transportation, culture, religion, indigenous creatures, and notable characters and locations.

The book includes a revision and updating of de Camp's essay, the Krishna Stories. originally published in the fanzine New Frontiers, v. 1, no. 1, December 1959. Another version appeared as an introduction to his Krishna novel The Prisoner of Zhamanak (1982). The version in GURPS Planet Krishna differs in some respects from the previously published versions. The maps of the Triple Seas region and the city of Zanid in GURPS Planet Krishna are based on originals by de Camp that appeared in the New Frontiers version of the essay, while the maps of the spaceport of Novorecife and the stars of the Viagens setting are new. The "Timeline of Krishna" near the end of the book also makes use of the New Frontiers version of the essay, which included a chronology of the early Krishna stories.

== Publication history ==
GURPS Planet Krishna is a 128-page softcover book by James Cambias, with cartography by Ann Dupuis, interior art by Dan Smith, Terry Tidwell, Arthur Roberg, and Carol Scavella, and cover art by Kelly Freas. The book was published by Steve Jackson Games (SJG) in 1997.

In the 2014 book Designers & Dragons: The '80s, game historian Shannon Appelcline noted that Steve Jackson Games decided in the early 1990s to stop publishing adventures, and as a result "SJG was now putting out standalone GURPS books rather than the more complex tiered book lines. This included more historical subgenre books. Some, such as GURPS Camelot (1991) and GURPS China (1991), were clearly sub-subgenres, while others like GURPS Old West (1991) and GURPS Middle Ages I (1992) covered genres notably missing before this point." GURPS Planet Krishna is a standalone book.

== Reception ==
In the December 1997 edition of Dragon (Issue #242), Rick Swan admired this book, noting that it "includes pretty much everything you need to cobble together a Krishna campaign, with an emphasis on culture and daily life." Swan liked the tone of the book, commenting that writer James Cambias "writes with assurance and clarity." He did warn that "GURPS Krishna isn’t for everyone — if you’re a stickler for logic, you’re gonna hate this — but it's paradise for role-players with a sense of humor." He also noted the lack of a complete adventure, telling gamemasters "Be prepared to do some homework." Swan concluded by giving the book an above average rating of 4 out of 5, saying, "Nothing enlivens a dreary campaign like an oddball setting, and [this book] showcases oddballs of the first rank. Strip away the sci-fi elements, ditch the GURPS statistics, and you’re left with plenty of raw material for an eye-opening campaign."

== Other reviews ==
- Alarums & Excursions Issue 267 (November 1997, p. 51)

== See also ==
- List of GURPS publications
