= James Cambias =

American novelist (born 1966)

- Born: September 11, 1966 (age 59); New Orleans, Louisiana, U.S.
- Education: University of Chicago (BA)
- Occupation: Writer
- Spouse: Diane Kelly (biologist)
- Children: 2
- Writing career
- Genre: Science fiction
- Website: www.jamescambias.com

James Cambias (also as James L. Cambias) is an American science fiction and fantasy writer and tabletop game designer.

== Biography ==
Born and raised in New Orleans, Louisiana, Cambias became interested in space and astronomy at a young age. He received a degree in the History, Philosophy, and Social Studies of Science and Medicine from the University of Chicago, focusing particularly on Robert Hooke and the Royal Society. He currently lives in Western Massachusetts with his wife and two children.

His early writing focused on role-playing games, particularly adventures and support material for Space 1889. His first role playing book was published by Iron Crown Enterprises in 1994, and he has written or contributed to books for Last Unicorn Games, Hero Games, and Steve Jackson Games, including Star Trek: The Next Generation Role-playing Game, GURPS Mars, Star Hero, and GURPS Space. He is one of the founders of Zygote Games, and the co-designer of the game Bone Wars: The Game of Ruthless Paleontology, based on the Bone Wars of the late 19th century; and Parasites Unleashed, a game for younger players based on parasitology.

His first professionally published fiction appeared in 2000. This first story, "A Diagram of Rapture," was well-received and garnered nominations for the 2000 Tiptree Award and the 2001 Locus Award, as well as earning Cambias a nomination for the 2001 John W. Campbell Award for Best New Writer. He continued to primarily write short fiction for the next ten years, and his work was subsequently published in The Magazine of Fantasy and Science Fiction, The Journal of Pulse-Pounding Narratives, Crossroads: Tales of the Southern Literary Fantastic, All-Star Zeppelin Adventure Stories, Hellboy: Odder Jobs, Lady Churchill's Rosebud Wristlet, and several Year's Best anthologies.

His first full-length novel, A Darkling Sea (2014) concerns the encounter between humans and two species of sentient extraterrestrials. The book received positive reviews, mentioning the meticulous world-building and believable aliens as particular strengths. Cambias has cited his hatred of the "famous Star Trek Prime Directive" as direct influence on the book, stating that "It’s a rule which can only be invented by people who don’t need it." A Darkling Sea was nominated for the Locus Award, the John W. Campbell Memorial Award, and the Compton Crook Award, as well as the Kurd Lasswitz Prize for the German translation of the novel as "Bestes ausländisches Werk."

His second novel is the 2015 techno-thriller Corsair, about space pirates in a near-future hard science-fiction setting. His third novel, Arkad's World, is a "coming-of-age story about a human boy alone on an alien planet." Cambias has said that follow-up novels to both Corsair and A Darkling Sea are in the works. Currently, he is working on the fourth book of The Billion Worlds series - The Ishtar Deception.

Cambias has become known for attending conventions and readings in semiformal wear, often sporting a bow-tie.

== Bibliography ==
=== Novels ===
- A Darkling Sea (2014, Tor Books, ISBN 978-0-76533-628-6)
- Corsair (2015, Tor Books, ISBN 978-1-52266-048-4)
- Arkad's World (2019, Baen Books, ISBN 978-1-48148-370-4)
- The Initiate (2020, Baen Books, ISBN 978-1-98212-435-9)

The Billion Worlds Novels

- The Godel Operation (2021, Baen Books, ISBN 978-1-9821-2556-1)
- The Scarab Mission (2024, Baen Books, ISBN 978-19821-9324-9)
- The Miranda Conspiracy (2025, Baen Books, ISBN 978-1-66807-240-0)

=== Short fiction ===
- "The Alien Abduction" (Sep 2000, The Magazine of Fantasy and Science Fiction)
- "A Diagram of Rapture" (April 2000, The Magazine of Fantasy and Science Fiction)
- "Return to Skull Island" (June 2002, Journal of Pulse-Pounding Narratives)
- "Train of Events" (January 2003, The Magazine of Fantasy and Science Fiction)
- "Apocrypha" (January 2004, Journal of Pulse-Pounding Narratives)
- "The Ocean of the Blind" (April 2004, The Magazine of Fantasy and Science Fiction, later adapted in A Darkling Sea)
- "See My King All Dressed in Red" (August 2004, Crossroads: Tales of the Southern Literary Fantastic)
- "The Vampire Brief" (October 2004, Hellboy: Odder Jobs)
- "The Eckener Alternative" (November 2004, All Star Zeppelin Adventure Stories)
- "Parsifal (Prix Fixe)" (February 2006, The Magazine of Fantasy and Science Fiction)
- "The Barbary Shore" (October 2007, Shimmer)
- "Balancing Accounts" (February 2008, The Magazine of Fantasy and Science Fiction)
- "The Dinosaur Train" (July 2008, The Magazine of Fantasy and Science Fiction)
- "Makeover" (July 2009, Nature Magazine)
- "The Wolf and the Schoolmaster" (January 2010, Shimmer)
- "How Seosiris Lost the Favor of the King" (September 2010, The Magazine of Fantasy and Science Fiction)
- "Object Three" (November 2011, The Magazine of Fantasy and Science Fiction)
- "Contractual Obligation" (July 2014, War Stories: New Military Science Fiction)
- "Periapsis" (September 2014, Hieroglyph: Stories and Visions for a Better Future)
- "A Right Jolly Old…" (February 2016, Conspiracy!, published again July 2017, Science Fiction for the Throne: One-Sitting Reads)
- "Golden Gate Blues" (March/April 2016, The Magazine of Fantasy and Science Fiction)
- "Treatment Option" (June 2017, Seat 14C)
- "René Descartes and the Cross of Blood" (July 2018, Lady Churchill's Rosebud Wristlet #38)

=== Collections ===
- Outlaws and Aliens, self-published chapbook (2016)
- Monster Island Tales, self-published chapbook (2017)
