= The Mathematics of Magic: The Enchanter Stories of L. Sprague de Camp and Fletcher Pratt =

2007 collection of stories

The Mathematics of Magic
- First edition of The Mathematics of Magic
- Author: L. Sprague de Camp and Fletcher Pratt
- Cover artist: Marc Fishman
- Language: English
- Series: Harold Shea
- Genre: Fantasy
- Publisher: NESFA Press
- Publication date: 2007
- Publication place: United States
- Media type: Print (Hardbound)
- Pages: 512
- ISBN: 1-886778-65-5
- OCLC: 144227703

The Mathematics of Magic: The Enchanter Stories of L. Sprague de Camp and Fletcher Pratt is an omnibus collection of seven fantasy stories by American science fiction and fantasy authors L. Sprague de Camp and Fletcher Pratt, gathering material previously published in three volumes as The Incomplete Enchanter (1941), The Castle of Iron (1950), and Wall of Serpents (1960) together with additional material from The Enchanter Reborn (1992) and The Exotic Enchanter (1995). It represents an expansion of the earlier omnibuses The Compleat Enchanter, which contained only the material in the first two volumes, and The Complete Compleat Enchanter, which contained only the material in the first three volumes. The expanded version also differs from the previous omnibuses in its selection of supplementary material. The Mathematics of Magic is the first edition of the authors' Harold Shea series to include every one of their contributions to it in one volume. Contributions to the series of other authors from the collections of the 1990s are omitted.

The collection was edited by Mark L. Olson and first published in hardcover by NESFA Press in February, 2007. The stories in the collection were originally published in magazine form in the May 1940, August 1940 and April 1941 issues of Unknown, the June 1953 issue of Fantasy Fiction, the November 1954 issue of Beyond Fantasy Fiction, the World Fantasy Convention program book for 1990, and the collection The Exotic Enchanter in 1995. De Camp's essay "Fletcher and I" was originally published in The Compleat Enchanter in 1975, and Jerry Pournelle's essay "Arming the Incomplete Enchanter" was originally published in George H. Scithers' fanzine Amra.

== Summary ==
The Harold Shea stories are parallel world tales in which universes where magic works coexist with our own, and in which those based on the mythologies, legends, and literary fantasies of our world and can be reached by aligning one's mind to them by a system of symbolic logic. Psychologist Harold Shea and his colleagues Reed Chalmers, Walter Bayard, and Vaclav Polacek (Votsy), travel to several such worlds, joined in the course of their adventures by Belphebe and Florimel of Faerie, who become the wives of Shea and Chalmers, and Pete Brodsky, a policeman who is accidentally swept up into the chaos. The seven stories collected in The Complete Compleat Enchanter explore the worlds of Norse mythology in "The Roaring Trumpet", Edmund Spenser's The Faerie Queene in "The Mathematics of Magic", Ludovico Ariosto's Orlando Furioso (with a brief stop in Samuel Taylor Coleridge's Kubla Khan) in "The Castle of Iron", the Kalevala in "The Wall of Serpents", Irish mythology in "The Green Magician", L. Frank Baum's land of Oz in "Sir Harold and the Gnome King", and Edgar Rice Burroughs's Barsoom in "Sir Harold of Zodanga".

== Contents ==
- "Introduction" (by Christopher Stasheff)
- "The Roaring Trumpet" (by L. Sprague de Camp and Fletcher Pratt)
- "The Mathematics of Magic" (by L. Sprague de Camp and Fletcher Pratt)
- "The Castle of Iron" (by L. Sprague de Camp and Fletcher Pratt)
- "The Wall of Serpents" (by L. Sprague de Camp and Fletcher Pratt)
- "The Green Magician" (by L. Sprague de Camp and Fletcher Pratt)
- "Fletcher and I" (by L. Sprague de Camp)
- "Sir Harold and the Gnome King" (by L. Sprague de Camp)
- "Sir Harold of Zodanga" (by L. Sprague de Camp)
- "Arming the Incomplete Enchanter" (by Jerry Pournelle)
- "An Enchanter Bibliography"

== Reception ==
The collection was reviewed by Tom Easton in Analog Science Fiction and Fact, October 2007.
