= Starship Troupers =

Novel series by Christopher Stasheff

A Company Of Stars
- Author: Christopher Stasheff
- Cover artist: David Mattingly
- Language: English
- Series: Starship Troupers
- Genre: Science fiction
- Publisher: Del Rey Books
- Publication date: 1991
- Publication place: United States
- Media type: Print (hardback & paperback)
- Pages: 313
- ISBN: 0-345-36889-4
- OCLC: 26707051

We Open On Venus
- Author: Christopher Stasheff
- Cover artist: David Mattingly
- Language: English
- Series: Starship Troupers
- Genre: Science fiction
- Publisher: Del Rey Books
- Publication date: 1993
- Publication place: United States
- Media type: Print (hardback & paperback)
- Pages: 347
- ISBN: 0-345-36891-6

A Slight Detour
- Author: Christopher Stasheff
- Cover artist: David Mattingly
- Language: English
- Series: Starship Troupers
- Genre: Science fiction
- Publisher: Del Rey Books
- Publication date: 1994
- Publication place: United States
- Media type: Print (hardback & paperback)
- Pages: 297
- ISBN: 0-345-37601-3

Starship Troupers is a series of science fiction novels by American author Christopher Stasheff. It includes three books: A Company Of Stars, We Open On Venus, and A Slight Detour. It also occupies the same continuity as Stasheff's Warlock of Gramarye and Rogue Wizard series. Set in the 26th century, after the human race has established colonies on distant planets and interstellar commerce supports Terra (Earth, sometimes known affectionately as "Old Earth") and the Terran Sphere of worlds, the novels follow the establishment and subsequent journeys of the Star Theater Company, the first-ever interstellar theatre troupe. The series title, Starship Troupers, was intended as a play on Robert Heinlein's Starship Troopers novel.

The novels are written in two first-person participant narratives, those of the characters Ramou Lazarian and Horace Burbage, alternating between each character. Sometimes, the characters are together as events unfold and the narrative switches between their different perspectives. Other times, the characters are engaged in separate activities, and they narrate their experiences accordingly.

Throughout the novels, hints are dropped as to the characters' futures, such as Ramou musing that years after the novel's events, Barry confided in him the nature of courtesy toward others. This suggests the entire series may be viewed as the reminiscences of the two narrators about events that have already happened, rather than a moment-by-moment account of events as they unfold.

== Books ==
- A Company Of Stars 1991. Del Rey Books Books.
- We Open On Venus 1993. Del Rey Books Books.
- A Slight Detour 1994. Del Rey Books Books.
- The Unknown Guest 2012. Self-published.

== Reception ==
The first book in the series, A Company of Stars, was released to mixed reviews. The slow pace, in which the author "painstakingly sets the stage and assembles the cast of characters" was a concern, leading the Library Journal to suggest that it was probably primarily of interest in areas where the author already has a readership. Alternatively, while Roland Green, writing for the Chicago Sun-Times, also noted that the book was slow in places, this, he argued, was balanced by Stasheff's "knowledge and love" of the theatre, and he noted the strength of the characterization – in particular the two main characters, Ramou and Horace. On the negative side, Green made reference to how the traveling theater company seemed "unchanged" over the centuries, and the view appears to have been reflected in the Publishers Weekly review, wherein it was stated that the book could "just as well be set in the 1950s". Other books in the series were less well received. For example, Glenn Giffin, while classifying the third novel as a "beach-blanket book", (a light and undemanding read), noted that it was very similar to the second in the series, and stated, "Stasheff needs to get his act together". , Statasheff regards A Company of Stars as one of his favorites out of the books he has written, along with his earlier works, The Warlock in Spite of Himself and Her Majesty's Wizard.
