= Sir Harold and the Gnome King =

1990 fantasy novella by L. Sprague de Camp

- cover of first paperback edition of Sir Harold and the Gnome King
- Author: L. Sprague de Camp
- Illustrator: Stephen Fabian
- Cover artist: Stephen Fabian
- Language: English
- Series: Harold Shea
- Genre: Fantasy
- Publisher: Wildside Press
- Publication date: 1991
- Publication place: United States
- Media type: Print (Hardback)
- Pages: 71
- Preceded by: Professor Harold and the Trustees
- Followed by: Sir Harold and the Monkey King

Sir Harold and the Gnome King is a 1991 fantasy novella by American writer L. Sprague de Camp, as part of the Harold Shea series he originated in collaboration with Fletcher Pratt and later continued with Christopher Stasheff. It was first published in the 1990 World Fantasy Convention Program Book. It first appeared in book form as a limited edition hardcover chapbook issued by Wildside Press in August, 1991, with a paperback edition following from the same publisher in October of the same year. In addition to the title story, the book includes an afterword by de Camp and illustrations by Stephen Fabian; the paperback edition also has a cover by Fabian. The story was afterwards reprinted, slightly revised, in de Camp and Stasheff's shared world anthology The Enchanter Reborn (1992). The original version was later reprinted together with the remainder of the de Camp/Pratt Harold Shea stories in the collection The Mathematics of Magic: The Enchanter Stories of L. Sprague de Camp and Fletcher Pratt (2007).

The Harold Shea stories are parallel world tales in which universes where magic works coexist with our own, and in which those based on the mythologies, legends, and literary fantasies of our world and can be reached by aligning one's mind to them by a system of symbolic logic. In Sir Harold and the Gnome King, Shea visits two such worlds, first (briefly) that of L. Ron Hubbard's setting from The Case of the Friendly Corpse (actually invented by John D. Clark and Mark Baldwin) and second L. Frank Baum's land of Oz.

As originally written, Sir Harold and the Gnome King was a direct sequel to de Camp and Pratt's previous Harold Shea story "The Green Magician", and appears to have been intended to tie up the main loose end remaining from that story, in which Shea's colleague Walter Bayard had been left stranded in the world of Irish mythology. Another issue addressed was a long-standing plot complication introduced by L. Ron Hubbard's "borrowing" of Shea for use in his novella The Case of the Friendly Corpse (1941), previously ignored by de Camp and Pratt. While the collaborators' original discussions for a sequel to "The Green Magician" had called for a story set in the world of Persian mythology, de Camp abandoned that plan in the sequel written.

When the story was reprinted in The Enchanter Reborn another tale, "Professor Harold and the Trustees", was interposed between it and "The Green Magician", necessitating some alteration to take into account the events of the new story. This was clumsily done through the insertion of a phrase into one sentence in a way that disturbed the actual sense of the sentence; further, a longer block of text was allowed to remain which should have been excised, as it directly contradicts the account of the new story.

== Plot ==
Harold Shea's wife Belphebe of Faerie suggests he undertake a transdimensional expedition to retrieve his colleague Walter Bayard, who is stranded in the world of Irish mythology. Walter's long absence has put him in danger of losing his tenure at the Garaden Institute that employs both him and Harold as psychologists. A secondary advantage to Belphebe will be to get Harold out of her hair; she is pregnant with their first child, and he is getting on her nerves. Harold prepares for the trip more carefully than on previous occasions, reluctant to risk his life as cavalierly as before now that he has a family. In particular, he replaces the épée he formerly favored with a stronger cavalry saber, and dons a mail shirt for greater protection. To ensure he is able to locate Walter amid the uncertainties of transdimensional travel, he makes the goal of his expedition not Eriu but the Land of Oz, whose rulers are possessed of an artifact "effective as a teletransporter," the Magic Belt of the Gnome King. (De Camp prefers the standard spelling of "gnome" to Baum's idiosyncratic "nome.")

Instead of Oz, Harold ends up in a decidedly more sinister place, the University of the Unholy Names in Dej, a world of vaguely Islamic and Arabic antecedents. There he encounters the student Bilsa at-Tâlib, who enthusiastically suggests a magical contest between them and conjures up a gigantic snake that immediately snaps Harold up. Fortunately, the latter's mail shirt protects him long enough for him to repeat the spell that transports him between worlds, and this time he really does end up in Oz (thankfully sans snake).

The Oz he encounters is greatly changed from the land of which Baum had written, the enchantment that had kept its inhabitants ageless having been broken through a misuse of magic by a dabbler in spells named Dranol Drabbo some years prior. Dorothy Gale and Princess Ozma are now grown up, married, and with children of their own. Moreover, Harold finds Ozma's husband, King Evardo of Ev, a much more canny and realistic ruler than Ozma in her youth; the royal pair is willing to help him, but only for a price! Lengthy negotiations ensue, as a result of which Harold finds himself committed to rescuing their son Prince Oznev, who is being held captive by Kaliko, the current king of the Gnomes.

To facilitate his foray into the Gnome Kingdom Harold demands and receives the service of former gnome king Ruggedo, an old enemy of Oz, as guide, along with tarncaps to render them invisible. He also commissions the local blacksmith to forge a pair of bolt cutters under his direction with which to free Oznev. Meanwhile, Ozma uses the Magic Belt to summon Walter from Eriu. Much to her embarrassment Walter arrives in bed and with a bedmate, having recently acquired an Irish wife, Boann ni Colum.

On the way to the underground Gnome Kingdom Ruggedo, pondering his past failures, consults Harold in his psychological capacity. His problem, it turns out, is that he is an unscrupulous, treacherous, selfish, greedy, lying, thieving scoundrel, and at the same time an irascible, ornery, cantankerous, ill-mannered, bad-tempered old grouch. Harold informs him that he will never be popular while remaining both; to succeed, he must overcome one trait or the other.

Afterward the two penetrate the Gnomish Kingdom and manage to liberate Oznev. Ruggedo, determined to apply Harold's advice, stays to dispute the throne with Kaliko. Meanwhile, Harold and the prince duel with and defeat Drabbo, who has become Kaliko's chancellor.

Rescuer and prince return to Oz amid general acclaim. Harold then prepares for his return home, whence Walter and Boann plan to follow in the wake of the banquet celebrating Oznev's deliverance. As for Ruggedo, when last seen he had expelled Kaliko from the Gnome Kingdom, declared monarchy obsolete, and proclaimed himself Lifetime President and Founding Father of the Gnomic Republic.

== Reception ==
The novella was said to " continu[e] the Harold Shea series, but it lacks their ingenuity and liveliness."

=== Differences from earlier Harold Shea stories ===
In previous tales Harold indulged his yearning for romantic adventure; this one brings his more practical characteristics to the fore. It also marks a major change in both the fantasy worlds de Camp chooses for his protagonist to visit and the manner in which they are portrayed: hitherto, Harold was sent primarily to venues based on mythology or pre-modern fantastic literature; these were depicted more or less faithfully according to the original sources, and much of the action involved puzzling out and becoming proficient in the magical systems holding sway in them. Now the venues are drawn from modern fantasy and are reimagined in a way that strips them of what de Camp regards as their more absurd aspects. Thus, exploration of the source material is displaced by a revisionist view of it, while the protagonists’ interest in figuring out the local physics gives way to the pursuit of more immediate goals.

In the present tale Harold displays no intrinsic interest in the magic of Oz, but only in how it might further his objectives. The "absurdities" dispensed with include the agelessness of the Ozites and Ozma's youthful innocence and strict sense of justice; the former having been eliminated by Dranol Drabbo's misuse of magic and the latter, recharacterized as childish foolishnesses, by Ozma having outgrown them with age and experience. De Camp's abandonment of an ageless Oz has one literary precursor in a similar visit to Baum's creation related in a work of his colleague Robert A. Heinlein, The Number of the Beast, in which some of the problematic aspects of agelessness are expounded.De Camp's revisionistic tendencies would become even more pronounced in his subsequent Harold Shea tale, "Sir Harold of Zodanga".

In an inconsistency between the present story and previous entries in the series, the era in which it takes place seems to have been silently revised from the 1940s of the original tales to the 1990s in which it was written. For instance, Harold and Belphebe are able to learn the gender of their unborn child through a test unknown in the 1940s; Harold also displays knowledge of the 1986 death of L. Ron Hubbard and Hubbard's authorial connection with the world of The Friendly Corpse — even though the Hubbard story was published in the 1940s and takes place after Harold's visit to that world in the present tale.

== Notes ==
Preceded by "Professor Harold and the Trustees"	Harold Shea Series; Sir Harold and the Gnome King	Succeeded by "Sir Harold and the Monkey King"
