= Harold Shea =

Protagonist of the "Enchanter" series

Harold Shea Stories/Enchanter series
- "The Roaring Trumpet" in Unknown, May 1940
- "The Roaring Trumpet" (1940); "The Mathematics of Magic" (1940); "The Castle of Iron" (1941, 1950); "The Wall of Serpents" (1953); "The Green Magician" (1954); "Professor Harold and the Trustees" (1992); "Sir Harold and the Gnome King" (1990); "Sir Harold and the Monkey King" (1992); "Knight and the Enemy" (1992); "Arms and the Enchanter" (1992); "Enchanter Kiev" (1995); "Sir Harold and the Hindu King" (1995); "Sir Harold of Zodanga" (1995); "Harold Sheakespeare" (1995); "Return to Xanadu" (2005)
- Author: L. Sprague de Camp and Fletcher Pratt, various
- Country: USA
- Language: English
- Genre: Science fantasy
- Published: 1940–1954, 1990–2005
- No. of books: 5 (original series), 10 (later series)

Harold Shea is the protagonist of five science fantasy stories by the collaborative team of L. Sprague de Camp and Fletcher Pratt, as well as later stories by de Camp alone, Christopher Stasheff, Holly Lisle, John Maddox Roberts, Roland J. Green, Frieda A. Murray, Tom Wham, and Lawrence Watt-Evans. De Camp and Stasheff collectively oversaw the continuations. The series is also known as the "Enchanter" series, the "Incomplete Enchanter" series (after the first collection of stories) or the "Compleat Enchanter" series.

In the original five stories, psychologist Harold Shea and his colleagues Reed Chalmers, Walter Bayard, and Vaclav Polacek (Votsy) travel to various parallel worlds where ancient myths or old literature are reality. In the course of their travels, other characters are added to the main cast, notably Belphebe and Florimel, who become the wives of Shea and Chalmers, respectively, and Pete Brodsky, a policeman who is accidentally swept up into the chaos. In the later continuations, the most notable additions to the cast are the recurring villain Malambroso and Voglinda, the young daughter of Shea and Belphebe.

== Original series ==
The protagonists utilize a system of symbolic logic to project themselves into the worlds they visit, but it is an inexact science, and they miss their target realities as often as they hit them. For example, in the first story, "The Roaring Trumpet", Shea intends to visit the world of Irish mythology, and instead ends up in Norse mythology. Most of the worlds visited have systems of physics different from ours, usually magical, which the heroes devote a considerable amount of effort to learning and applying. Much humor is drawn both from the culture shock of their encounters and from the reality that they usually do not understand the local systems well enough to be able to predict the actual effects of the spells they attempt.

Much of the series' attraction stems from the interaction of the psychologists' logical, rationalistic viewpoints with the wildly counterintuitive physics of the worlds they visit. Their attitudes provide something of a deconstructionist look at the basic rationales of these worlds, hitherto unexamined either by their inhabitants or even their original creators. They allow the reader to view these worlds from a fresh viewpoint. The "worlds" so examined include not only the Norse world of "The Roaring Trumpet", but also the worlds of Edmund Spenser's The Faerie Queene in "The Mathematics of Magic", Ludovico Ariosto's Orlando Furioso (with a brief stop in Samuel Taylor Coleridge's Xanadu from "Kubla Khan") in "The Castle of Iron", the Kalevala in "The Wall of Serpents", and, at last, Irish mythology in "The Green Magician".

With "The Green Magician" the original collaboration ended, Pratt's early death precluding any additional entries. A final planned story set in the world of Persian mythology was never written, nor was a projected response to L. Ron Hubbard's misuse of their hero in his novella The Case of the Friendly Corpse (1941). (De Camp would finally address the latter issue in "Sir Harold and the Gnome King".)

Reviewing the 1950 edition of The Castle of Iron, Boucher and McComas described the series as "a high point in the application of sternest intellectual logic to screwball fantasy". Damon Knight characterized the series as "relaced, ribald adventure ... priceless," saying that "no fantasy reader should be without them." In 1977 Richard A. Lupoff described the series as "whole planes above the hackneyed gut-spillers and skull-smashers that pass for heroic fantasy."

== Second series ==
After Pratt died in 1956, De Camp was reluctant to continue the series on his own, feeling that the collaboration with Pratt had a flavor impossible for either of them to duplicate alone. When he finally did revive the series in company with younger authors nearly forty years later, this impression was seemingly borne out; while not without interest, his own solo contributions to the second series exhibit a wryer, more cynical view of the worlds toured, and the protagonists' problematic use of magic is abandoned. His interest appears to have shifted to debunking the less credible aspects of the universes visited, rather than taking these as a given and extrapolating the fantasy worlds' physical or magical laws from them, as in the previous sequence. On the other hand, some of the new authors made efforts to duplicate de Camp and Pratt's original achievement, exploring fresh venues where their heroes once again have to learn the world's fundamental magical rules from the ground up. Holly Lisle ("Knight and the Enemy"), John Maddox Roberts ("Arms and the Enchanter") and Tom Wham ("Harold Sheakespeare") were among the authors who recreated the original formula.

The initial impulse for the continuation may have been the successful adaptation of the characters into Tom Wham's authorized gamebook adventure Prospero's Isle, published by Tor Books in October 1987 (the basis of "Harold Sheakespeare"), to which de Camp had contributed an admiring introduction. This may have encouraged him to wrap up long-unresolved loose ends from the original series, such as the stranding of Walter Bayard in the world of Irish mythology, and to resolve the unaddressed complication introduced by L. Ron Hubbard's "borrowing" of Harold Shea for use in his novel The Case of the Friendly Corpse. Both of these goals he accomplished in Sir Harold and the Gnome King (1990 chapbook). When the decision was made to continue the series further, this story was revised slightly to reconcile it with the other new stories, though the fit is somewhat awkward.

Once the loose ends are resolved, most of the action in the second sequence involves Shea and Chalmers' quest across several universes to rescue Florimel, who has been kidnapped by the malevolent enchanter Malambroso. After Florimel is finally recovered, a similar effort must be made to recover Shea and Belphebe's daughter Voglinda, likewise seized by the unrepentant Malambroso. A final tale sends Shea and Belephebe on an unrelated adventure precipitated by the foolishness of Shea's colleague Polacek.

Milieus encountered in the second series include the worlds of Irish myth and the Orlando Furioso (again) in "Professor Harold and the Trustees", L. Ron Hubbard's setting from The Case of the Friendly Corpse and L. Frank Baum's land of Oz in "Sir Harold and the Gnome King", the classical Chinese epic novel Journey to the West in "Sir Harold and the Monkey King," the romantic fantasies of Miguel de Cervantes' Don Quixote (with the unique twist of its being Quixote's version of reality rather than Cervantes') in "Knight and the Enemy", Virgil's Graeco-Roman epic the Aeneid in "Arms and the Enchanter", the old Russian Tale of Igor's Campaign in "Enchanter Kiev," Bhavabhuti's Baital Pachisi (or "Vikram and the Vampire"), a proto-Arabian Nights collection of Indian tales, in "Sir Harold and the Hindu King", Edgar Rice Burroughs' Barsoom in "Sir Harold of Zodanga", and William Shakespeare's The Tempest in "Harold Sheakespeare".

There exists one additional contribution to the series; "Return to Xanadu" by Lawrence Watt-Evans, which revisits the world of Kubla Khan and transfers a minor character appearing therein to that of The Arabian Nights by the agency of an unnamed magician who appears to be intended to represent L. Sprague de Camp himself. "Return to Xanadu" was first published in The Enchanter Completed: A Tribute Anthology for L. Sprague de Camp edited by Harry Turtledove and published by Baen Books in 2005.

== Publication ==
The original publication of the first three Pratt and De Camp collaborations ("Roaring Trumpet", "Mathematics of Magic", and The Castle of Iron) was in Unknown Magazine during its brief run. The remaining two appeared in Beyond Fantasy Magazine and Fantasy Magazine a few years later. Sir Harold and the Gnome King first appeared in the World Fantasy Convention program book in 1990 and as a chapbook the following year. It was later revised and appeared with the remainder of the later continuations in regular trade books.

== Yngvi ==
In the original story a character in a jail comes to the bars every hour on the hour to announce that "Yngvi is a louse!" This phrase has moved into the lexicon and has taken on a life of its own in certain SF-related circles. Who, or what, Yngvi may be is not mentioned in the book, though in Old Norse, Yngvi is another name for the god Freyr.

== Bibliography ==
=== Original stories ===
- "The Roaring Trumpet" (May 1940, by L. Sprague de Camp and Fletcher Pratt)
- "The Mathematics of Magic" (August 1940, by L. Sprague de Camp and Fletcher Pratt)
- "The Castle of Iron" (April 1941, expanded to novel-length as The Castle of Iron, 1950; by L. Sprague de Camp and Fletcher Pratt)
- "The Wall of Serpents" (1953, by L. Sprague de Camp and Fletcher Pratt)
- "The Green Magician" (1954, by L. Sprague de Camp and Fletcher Pratt)

=== Later stories ===
- "Sir Harold and the Gnome King" (1990, by L. Sprague de Camp)
- "Professor Harold and the Trustees" (1992, by Christopher Stasheff)
- "Sir Harold and the Monkey King" (1992, by Christopher Stasheff)
- "Knight and the Enemy" (1992, by Holly Lisle, from an outline by L. Sprague de Camp and Christopher Stasheff)
- "Arms and the Enchanter" (1992, by John Maddox Roberts, from an outline by L. Sprague de Camp and Christopher Stasheff)
- "Enchanter Kiev" (1995, by Roland J. Green & Frieda A. Murray)
- "Sir Harold and the Hindu King" (1995, by Christopher Stasheff)
- "Sir Harold of Zodanga" (1995, by L. Sprague de Camp)
- "Harold Sheakespeare" (1995, by Tom Wham)
- "Return to Xanadu" (2005, by Lawrence Watt-Evans)

=== Collected editions ===
- The Incomplete Enchanter (1941) (L. Sprague de Camp and Fletcher Pratt), includes: "The Roaring Trumpet" and "The Mathematics of Magic"
- The Castle of Iron (1950) (L. Sprague de Camp and Fletcher Pratt), a novel-length expansion of the original story
- Wall of Serpents (1960) (L. Sprague de Camp and Fletcher Pratt), includes: "The Wall of Serpents" and "The Green Magician"
- The Enchanter Reborn (1992) (L. Sprague de Camp and Christopher Stasheff), includes: "Professor Harold and the Trustees," "Sir Harold and the Gnome King," "Sir Harold and the Monkey King," "Knight and the Enemy," and "Arms and the Enchanter"
- The Exotic Enchanter (1995) (L. Sprague de Camp and Christopher Stasheff), includes: "Enchanter Kiev," "Sir Harold and the Hindu King," "Sir Harold of Zodanga," and "Harold Sheakespeare"

The Incomplete Enchanter and The Castle of Iron have also been issued together as The Compleat Enchanter (1975); Wall of Serpents has also been issued under the title The Enchanter Compleated (1980); all three volumes of the original series have also been issued together as The Complete Compleat Enchanter (1989). The original tales and de Camp's additions from the 1990s were issued together as The Mathematics of Magic: The Enchanter Stories of L. Sprague de Camp and Fletcher Pratt (2007).

=== Gamebooks ===
- Prospero's Isle (1987, by Tom Wham)
