= The Complete Compleat Enchanter =

1988 collection of fantasy stories by L. Sprague de Camp and Fletcher Pratt

The Intrepid Enchanter
- cover from the first edition
- Author: L. Sprague de Camp and Fletcher Pratt
- Cover artist: Ian Miller
- Language: English
- Series: Harold Shea
- Genre: Fantasy
- Publisher: Sphere Books
- Publication date: 1988
- Publication place: United Kingdom
- Media type: Print (paperback)
- Pages: 498
- ISBN: 0-7474-0079-2
- OCLC: 19263202
- Followed by: The Enchanter Reborn

The Complete Compleat Enchanter is an omnibus collection of five fantasy stories by American authors L. Sprague de Camp and Fletcher Pratt, gathering material previously published in three volumes as The Incomplete Enchanter (1941), The Castle of Iron (1950), and Wall of Serpents (1960), and represents an expansion of the earlier omnibus The Compleat Enchanter, which contained only the material in the first two volumes. The expanded version also differs from the previous omnibus by omitting its afterword, de Camp's essay "Fletcher and I". The omnibus is the first edition of the authors' Harold Shea series to be complete in one volume. It has appeared under three different titles. It was first published in the UK in paperback by Sphere Books in 1988 under the title The Intrepid Enchanter and with a foreword by Catherine Crook de Camp. The first US edition appeared under the title The Complete Compleat Enchanter, and replaces the foreword with a preface by David Drake. That edition was published by Baen Books in 1989, and has been reprinted a number of times since. Orion Books published an edition in the UK under the title The Compleat Enchanter in 2000 as volume 10 of their Fantasy Masterworks series. The stories in the collection were originally published in magazine form in the May 1940, August 1940 and April 1941 issues of Unknown, the June 1953 issue of Beyond Fantasy, and the October 1954 issue of Fantasy.

The Harold Shea stories are parallel world tales in which universes where magic works coexist with our own, and in which those based on the mythologies, legends, and literary fantasies of our world and can be reached by aligning one's mind to them by a system of symbolic logic. Psychologist Harold Shea and his colleagues, Reed Chalmers, Walter Bayard and Vaclav Polacek (Votsy), travel to several such worlds, joined in the course of their adventures by Belphebe and the false Florimel of Faerie, who become the wives of Shea and Chalmers, and Pete Brodsky, a policeman who is accidentally swept up into the chaos. The five stories collected in The Complete Compleat Enchanter explore the worlds of Norse mythology in "The Roaring Trumpet", Edmund Spenser's The Faerie Queene in "The Mathematics of Magic", Ludovico Ariosto's Orlando Furioso (with a brief stop in Samuel Taylor Coleridge's Kubla Khan) in "The Castle of Iron", the Kalevala in "The Wall of Serpents", and Irish mythology in "The Green Magician".

== Contents ==
- "Foreword" (by Catherine Crook de Camp)
- "The Roaring Trumpet"
- "The Mathematics of Magic"
- "The Castle of Iron"
- "The Wall of Serpents"
- "The Green Magician"

== Sequels ==
Following publication of The Complete Compleat Enchanter, the Harold Shea series was continued by de Camp in partnership with Christopher Stasheff and other authors in the anthologies The Enchanter Reborn and The Exotic Enchanter.

== Sources ==
- Brown, Charles N.; William G. Contento. "The Locus Index to Science Fiction (1984-1998)".
- Brown, Charles N.; William G. Contento. "The Locus Index to Science Fiction (2000)".
- Laughlin, Charlotte; Daniel J. H. Levack (1983). De Camp: An L. Sprague de Camp Bibliography. San Francisco: Underwood/Miller. p. 30.

Preceded by none	Harold Shea Series; The Compleat Enchanter (= The Incomplete Enchanter, The Castle of Iron, and Wall of Serpents)	Succeeded by The Enchanter Reborn
