= The Wall of Serpents =

- Short story by L. Sprague de Camp and Fletcher Pratt
- First book edition (1960)
- Illustrator: Paul Orban
- Country: United States
- Language: English
- Genre: Fantasy novella

Publication
- Published in: Fantasy Fiction
- Publisher: Future Publications
- Media type: Print (Magazine)
- Publication date: June, 1953

Chronology
- Series: Harold Shea
| The Castle of Iron | The Green Magician |

The Wall of Serpents is a fantasy novella by American science fiction and fantasy authors L. Sprague de Camp and Fletcher Pratt. The fourth story in their Harold Shea series, it was first published in the June 1953 issue of the fantasy pulp magazine Fantasy Fiction. It first appeared in book form, together with its sequel, "The Green Magician", in the collection Wall of Serpents, issued in hardcover by Avalon Books in 1960; the book has been reissued by a number of other publishers since. It has also been reprinted in various anthologies and collections, including Great Short Novels of Adult Fantasy I (1972), The Complete Compleat Enchanter (1989), and The Mathematics of Magic: The Enchanter Stories of L. Sprague de Camp and Fletcher Pratt (2007). It has been translated into Italian and German.

The Harold Shea stories are parallel world tales in which universes where magic works coexist with our own, and in which those based on the mythologies, legends, and literary fantasies of our world and can be reached by aligning one's mind to them by a system of symbolic logic. In The Wall of Serpents, Shea visits his fifth such world, that of the Finnish mythological epic poem the Kalevala.

== Plot summary ==
When Harold Shea's wife Belphebe, originally from the world of Spenser's The Faerie Queene, was accidentally spirited off to that of Ariosto's Orlando Furioso (The Castle of Iron), he came under suspicion by the police for her disappearance. While he was ultimately successful in retrieving her, two others, his colleague Walter Bayard and policeman Pete Brodsky were left trapped in the world of Coleridge's Xanadu. As Shea's skill in traveling between universes is still somewhat hit or miss, he decides to seek professional assistance in rescuing them, from the wizard Väinämöinen in the world of the Kalevala. Harold and Belphebe attain the right world but the wrong magician, ending up instead with the touchy and unreliable Lemminkäinen, who tricks them into serving his ends. Persuading him they need their stranded friends' aid, Shea persuades the wizard to summon them. Later, after their quest with Lemminkäinen to Pohjola goes sour, Bayard inadvertently transports them to the world of Irish myth.

| Preceded by "The Castle of Iron" | Harold Shea Series; The Wall of Serpents | Succeeded by "The Green Magician" |
