= The Green Magician =

- Short story by L. Sprague de Camp and Fletcher Pratt
- Cover of The Dragon, June 1978, illustrating "The Green Magician"
- Illustrator: Kossin
- Country: United States
- Language: English
- Genre: Fantasy

Publication
- Published in: Beyond Fiction
- Publisher: Galaxy Publishing Corporation
- Media type: Print (Magazine)
- Publication date: November, 1954

Chronology
- Series: Harold Shea
The Wall of Serpents	Professor Harold and the Trustees

The Green Magician is a fantasy novella by American writers L. Sprague de Camp and Fletcher Pratt. The fifth story in their Harold Shea series, it was first published in the November 1954 issue of the fantasy pulp magazine Beyond Fiction. It first appeared in book form, together with "The Wall of Serpents", in the collection Wall of Serpents, issued in hardcover by Avalon Books in 1960; the book has been reissued by a number of other publishers since. It has also been reprinted in various magazines, anthologies and collections, including The Dragon (June–July 1978), The Complete Compleat Enchanter (1989), Masterpieces of Fantasy and Enchantment (1988), and The Mathematics of Magic: The Enchanter Stories of L. Sprague de Camp and Fletcher Pratt (2007). It has been translated into Italian and German.

The Harold Shea stories are parallel world tales in which universes where magic works coexist with our own, and in which those based on the mythologies, legends, and literary fantasies of our world and can be reached by aligning one's mind to them by a system of symbolic logic. In The Green Magician, Shea visits his sixth such world, that of Irish myth.

== Plot summary ==
Harold Shea and his wife Belphebe of Faerie have been attempting to rescue Shea's colleague Walter Bayard and policeman Pete Brodsky from the world of Coleridge's Xanadu. With professional assistance from the wizards of the Kalevala they succeeded in retrieving their friends, only to have Bayard inadvertently transport them to the world of Irish myth. Only the Sheas and Brodsky arrive together, however; Bayard appears to have misplaced himself.

The three meet the Irish hero Cuchulainn, who soon exhibits a disturbing interest in Belphebe. Aware that the local mores might force him to share his wife with their host, Harold attempts the return journey to their native universe, only to be stymied by Brodsky's unwillingness to go. Pete likes this version of Ireland, particularly after managing to beat one of the local bards in a singing contest. Instead, the travelers become embroiled in Cuchulainn's dispute with Ailill and Maev, king and queen of Connacht.

Eventually the Sheas do manage to transport themselves home, the reluctant Brodsky in tow. Once returned, he decides he's had his fill of mythological Ireland after all.

The fate of Walter Bayard remains a loose end, and is ultimately revealed in the later story "Sir Harold and the Gnome King."

== Notes ==
Preceded by "The Wall of Serpents"	Harold Shea Series; The Green Magician	Succeeded by "Professor Harold and the Trustees"
