= The Enchanter Completed =

The Enchanter Completed (or a variant thereof) is a title that has been given to two separate books relating to the fiction of science fiction and fantasy writer L. Sprague de Camp:

- The Enchanter Compleated, a 1980 edition of the collection originally and more usually titled Wall of Serpents
- The Enchanter Completed: A Tribute Anthology for L. Sprague de Camp, a 2005 gedenkschrift honoring de Camp edited by Harry Turtledove.
