= Land of Unreason =

1941 novel by Fletcher Pratt and L. Sprague de Camp

- Dust-jacket.
- Author: Fletcher Pratt and L. Sprague de Camp
- Cover artist: Boris Artzybasheff
- Language: English
- Genre: Fantasy
- Publisher: Henry Holt and Company
- Publication date: 1942
- Publication place: United States
- Media type: Print (Hardback)
- Pages: 260
- LC Class: PS3507.E2344

Land of Unreason is a fantasy novel by American writers Fletcher Pratt and L. Sprague de Camp. It was first published in the fantasy magazine Unknown Worlds for October, 1941 as "The Land of Unreason". Revised and expanded, it was first published in book form by Henry Holt and Company in 1942. It has been reprinted numerous times since by various publishers, including by Ballantine Books in January 1970 as the tenth volume of the Ballantine Adult Fantasy series. An E-book edition was published by Gollancz's SF Gateway imprint on September 29, 2011, as part of a general release of de Camp's works in electronic form.

== Plot ==
Fred Barber, an American staying as a guest in an English country home during World War II, consumes a bowl of milk left as an offering for the fairies, substituting liquor in its place. The rightful recipient of the offering, drunk and offended at the substitution, takes vengeance by kidnapping Barber off to the Land of Faerie as a changeling, a fate normally reserved for infants. He finds Faerie beset by a menace echoing the war in his own world. Trapped in a magical realm where rationality as he knows it is turned upside-down and failure to follow the rules can have dire consequences, Barber undertakes a quest in the service of Oberon, the fairy king, in order to be returned to his own world. The outcome, befitting a realm in which nothing is as expected, is one that neither he nor the reader anticipates, for Fred Barber is not quite the man he thinks he is.

== Reception ==
Orville Prescott of The New York Times found the novel "much less successful" than The Incomplete Enchanter, saying that "Successful fantasy requires a deft delicacy of touch quite lacking in the heavy-handed technique" used here. Another Times reviewer, Beatrice Sherman, however, praised Land for its "piquant style that combines the medieval phrasing of the fairy-folk's conversation, the very modern talk and turns of thought of the changeling hero, and descriptions practical and poetical of the eerie magic scenery". New Worlds reviewer James Cawthorn declared the novel a "witty exploration of the world of Shakespeare's A Midsummer Night's Dream". Ron Goulart described Land as "a screwball comedy . . . an affable novel, and for all its preoccupation with drinking and jumping into bed, a gentle one." Baird Searles noted the novel's "Alice-in-Wonderland surrealism, particularly when the inhabitants of Fairyland get going on logic-chopping and semantics. But the logic of this novel is illogic; the reason for it unreason; somehow it all hangs together triumphantly nonetheless". E. F. Bleiler found it "one of the better semihumorous heroic fantasies, a good child of Phantastes, with clever integration of incident and theme".

== Sources ==
- Bleiler, Everett (1948). The Checklist of Fantastic Literature. Chicago: Shasta Publishers. p. 226.
- Laughlin, Charlotte; Daniel J. H. Levack (1983). De Camp: An L. Sprague de Camp Bibliography. San Francisco: Underwood/Miller. pp. 70–71.
