= The Roaring Trumpet =

- Short story by L. Sprague de Camp and Fletcher Pratt
- Cover of Unknown, May 1940, illustrating "The Roaring Trumpet."
- Illustrator: Edd Cartier
- Country: United States
- Language: English
- Genre: Fantasy

Publication
- Publisher: Street & Smith
- Media type: Print (Magazine)
- Publication date: 1940

Chronology
- Series: Harold Shea
| — | The Mathematics of Magic |

"The Roaring Trumpet" is a fantasy novella by American writers L. Sprague de Camp and Fletcher Pratt. The initial story in their Harold Shea series, it was first published in the May 1940 issue of the fantasy pulp magazine Unknown. It first appeared in book form, together with its sequel, "The Mathematics of Magic", in the collection The Incomplete Enchanter, issued in hardcover by Henry Holt and Company in 1941, and in paperback by Pyramid Books in 1960. It has since been reprinted in various collections by numerous other publishers, including The Compleat Enchanter (1975), The Incomplete Enchanter (1979), The Complete Compleat Enchanter (1989), and The Mathematics of Magic: The Enchanter Stories of L. Sprague de Camp and Fletcher Pratt (2007). It has been translated into Dutch and Italian. In 2016, the story was shortlisted for the Retro Hugo Award for Best Novella.

The Harold Shea stories are parallel world tales in which universes where magic works coexist with our own, and in which those based on the mythologies, legends, and literary fantasies of our world can be reached by aligning one's mind to them by a system of symbolic logic. In "The Roaring Trumpet", Shea visits his first such world, that of Norse mythology.

== Plot summary ==
Psychologist Reed Chalmers speculates that the mental problems of his patients may stem from their minds not being fully in tune with the world they live in, but rather, partially in sync with other, parallel universes. He holds that if their minds were to be correctly aligned they could be cured, and, contrarily, that if completely realigned to another universe, they would be projected into that universe. Chalmers has devised a system of symbolic logic to encode the underlying assumptions of a universe into a mathematical formula, the use of which he believes could affect such a realignment. He is, however, hesitant to put his theory to a practical test.

Chalmers's subordinate colleague Harold Shea has fewer qualms. Dissatisfied with his life, he attempts to use his boss's process to project himself into the world of Irish heroic mythology, where with his modern knowledge he thinks to set himself up as a wonder worker. However, interdimensional travel proves an inexact science, and he misses his target reality landing instead in the decidedly colder, bleaker world of Norse myth. Moreover, the adjustment is complete; now speaking Old Norse, Shea is unable to read the English language Boy Scout Handbook he has brought as a survival manual. Worse, he finds his new world's superstitious, pre-scientific belief system encoded in its basic physics: his matches won't light, his stainless steel knife rusts, and magic actually works. Worst of all, the world is on the verge of Ragnarök, the final conflict between the Gods and the Giants.

Lost and freezing, Shea falls in with Odinn, who leads him to the mortal farmstead of Sverre, where the Gods are meeting. There he is befriended by the servant Thjalfi, through whose offices he comes under the dubious patronage of the malicious, mischief-making god Loki. More congenial is Loki's rival Heimdall, who fills Shea in on the situation. It seems that the gods face dim prospects in the coming battle, as two of their most potent magical weapons, Thor's hammer and Frey's sword, have been stolen by their enemies

Shea is enlisted into a quest to recover the Gods' treasures, joining Thor, Loki and Thjalfi in expedition to the stronghold of the Frost Giant Utgardaloki. There the Gods engage in contests with their hosts: Thor incredibly loses a wrestling match with an ancient crone, while Loki is beaten in an eating competition. Shea, seeing through the Giants' illusions, discovers that Thor's opponent is the Midgard Serpent and Loki's is fire. Realizing that the weapon they seek may be present under similar disguise, he finds Thor's hammer bespelled beneath the appearance of a quiver of arrows. Thor calls it to him and a battle royal ensues, in which Shea and Heimdall, present incognito, are captured by Fire Giants and hustled off to prison.

The two find prison life brutal and dull, passing the time by racing cockroaches until Shea comes up with a scheme to trick their troll jailer Snögg into releasing them. Pretending to be a warlock, he convinces Snögg he can shrink the troll's prodigious nose and so make him "handsome" enough (by troll standards) to win a wife. Shea thinks he and Heimdall can convince Snögg the spell has worked by pretending to see a reduction, but to his astonishment, the pretend spell actually works. The troll lives up to his end of the bargain, and during their escape Snögg recovers Frey's sword.

Their quest is a success, but Ragnarök is nearly at hand, and Heimdall cannot summon the gods to battle without authorization from Odinn. Continuing his experiments with magic, Shea whips up a couple of flying brooms to get them to him quickly. The ride is more interesting than it ought to be, since the broomsticks prove aerodynamically unstable. They catch up to Odinn in Hel, the coldest of the Nine Worlds, where the chief of the Gods, in disguise, is consulting a prophetess allied with the enemy. Heimdall reports their success. Realizing the Gods' identities, the furious hag attempts to banish them with her magic. They laugh off her efforts, and Odinn instructs Heimdall to blow his trumpet and muster the Gods. The hag turns her fury against Shea, and on him the banishment works. The din of the roaring trumpet still ringing in his ears, he suddenly finds himself back among his friends in his own world.

== Relation to Norse mythology ==
The plotline of the story is based on the myths of Thor's expedition to Jotunhem as told in the Gylfaginning section of Snorri Sturluson's Prose Edda, and the Völva's prophecy regarding Ragnarok in the poem Völuspá, preserved in the Poetic Edda.

== Sources ==
- Gyler, Mike. "1941 Retro Hugo Award Finalists". file770.
- Laughlin, Charlotte; Daniel J. H. Levack (1983). De Camp: An L. Sprague de Camp Bibliography. San Francisco: Underwood/Miller. pp. 67–68, 232–234.
- "Unknown — May, 1940, featuring "The Roaring Trumpet", by L. Sprague de Camp and Fletcher Pratt [M. Isip]". Words Envisioned, Literary Art and Illustration.

| Preceded by none | Harold Shea Series; The Roaring Trumpet | Succeeded by "The Mathematics of Magic" |
