= The Exotic Enchanter =

1995 anthology edited by L. Sprague de Camp and Christopher Stasheff

- Cover of the first edition.
- Author: L. Sprague de Camp and Christopher Stasheff
- Language: English
- Series: Harold Shea
- Genre: Fantasy
- Publisher: Baen Books
- Publication date: 1995
- Publication place: United States
- Media type: Print (paperback)
- Pages: 288
- ISBN: 0-671-87666-X
- OCLC: 32505645
- Preceded by: The Enchanter Reborn

The Exotic Enchanter is an anthology of four fantasy short stories edited by American writers L. Sprague de Camp and Christopher Stasheff. The Exotic Enchanter is the second volume in the continuation of the Harold Shea series by de Camp and Fletcher Pratt. It was first published in paperback by Baen Books in 1995; an ebook edition followed from the same publisher in September 2013. All the pieces are original to the anthology.

== The series ==
De Camp and Pratt's original Harold Shea stories are parallel world tales in which universes where magic works coexist with our own, and in which those based on the mythologies, legends, and literary fantasies of our world and can be reached by aligning one's mind to them by a system of symbolic logic. In these stories psychologist Harold Shea and his colleagues Reed Chalmers, Walter Bayard, and Vaclav Polacek (Votsy), travel to a number of such worlds. In the course of their travels other characters are added to the main cast, including Belphebe and Florimel, who become the wives of Shea and Chalmers, and Pete Brodsky, a policeman who is accidentally swept up into the chaos.

== The book ==
The Exotic Enchanter continues the new format of the series introduced in de Camp and Stasheff's previous volume, The Enchanter Reborn (1992), in which it was opened up into a shared world to which other authors were invited to contribute. In addition to stories by de Camp and Stasheff, who collectively oversaw the project, this volume includes contributions by Roland J. Green and Frieda A. Murray (in collaboration) and Tom Wham. Green and Murray may have worked from an outline provided by the editors as in the previous volume, though this is not stated. Wham's contribution is a distillation into concrete story form of his earlier authorized Harold Shea gamebook, Prospero's Isle, originally published by Tor Books in October 1987.

== Summary ==
The action in the first two stories concludes the quest by Shea and Chalmers to rescue Florimel that began in the previous volume, where she was kidnapped by the malevolent enchanter Malambroso. Their mission takes them into the worlds of the old Russian Tale of Igor's Campaign in "Enchanter Kiev", and that of Bhavabhuti's Baital Pachisi (or "Vikram and the Vampire"), a proto-Arabian Nights collection of Indian tales, in "Sir Harold and the Hindu King". After Florimel is finally recovered Shea and Belphebe must undertake a similar mission to Edgar Rice Burroughs's fictional version of Mars in "Sir Harold of Zodanga," this time to recover their daughter Voglinda, likewise seized by the unrepentant Malambroso. "Harold Shakespeare," the final tale, sends Shea and Belephebe on an unrelated adventure precipitated by the foolishness of Shea's colleague Polacek, into William Shakespeare's The Tempest.

== Contents ==
- "Enchanter Kiev" (Roland J. Green and Frieda A. Murray)
- "Sir Harold and the Hindu King" (Christopher Stasheff)
- "Sir Harold of Zodanga" (L. Sprague de Camp)
- "Harold Shakespeare" (Tom Wham)

== Sequel ==
While no more Harold Shea volumes were produced by de Camp and Stasheff, one additional contribution to the series was published later; "Return to Xanadu" by Lawrence Watt-Evans, which revisits the world of Kubla Khan first encountered (briefly) in de Camp and Pratt's The Castle of Iron. In this final tale a minor character from Xanadu is transported therefrom to the world of The Arabian Nights by the agency of an unnamed magician, who appears to be intended to represent L. Sprague de Camp himself. "Return to Xanadu" was published in The Enchanter Completed: A Tribute Anthology for L. Sprague de Camp, edited by Harry Turtledove and published by Baen Books in 2005.

== Notes ==
Preceded by The Enchanter Reborn	Harold Shea Series; The Exotic Enchanter	Succeeded by none
