= Double Jeopardy (Pratt novel) =

1952 novel by Fletcher Pratt

- First edition dust jacket
- Author: Fletcher Pratt
- Cover artist: Whitney Bender
- Language: English
- Genre: Science fiction
- Publisher: Doubleday
- Publication date: 1952
- Publication place: United States
- Media type: Print (hardcover)
- Pages: 214 pp

Double Jeopardy is a science fiction novel by Fletcher Pratt. It was first published in hardcover by Doubleday in 1952, and reprinted as a selection of the Science Fiction Book Club in 1953. The first paperback edition was issued in digest form by Galaxy Publishing Corporation as its Galaxy Science Fiction Novel #30 in 1957; a second paperback edition was issued by Curtis Books in 1967. The novel has been translated into Italian. The book is a combination of two shorter pieces, the novellas "Double Jeopardy" and "The Square Cube Law," originally published in the magazine Thrilling Wonder Stories in the issues for April, 1952 and June, 1952, respectively.

== Plot ==
The story features Pratt's detective hero George Helmfleety Jones in two adventures dealing with the ramifications of a newly discovered matter-duplication process. The first concerns a case of industrial espionage involving the bootlegging of duplicated drugs, and includes Jones's marriage to a duplicated woman. The second is a locked-room mystery in which a fortune is somehow stolen from a sealed, pilotless cargo plane.

== Reception ==
Groff Conklin called the book "a slick, fast-paced science fiction detective story, one of the best-integrated combinations of its kind." He rates the second part "considerably better than the first," with its "twist on the locked-room school of murder mysteries ... a highly effective one." The book was also reviewed by Noah Gordon in Avon Science Fiction and Fantasy Reader, January 1953, an anonymous reviewer in Weird Tales, January 1953, and P. Schuyler Miller in Astounding Science Fiction, April 1953.
