= The Compleat Enchanter =

1975 collection of fantasy stories by L. Sprague de Camp and Fletcher Pratt

- First edition
- Author: L. Sprague de Camp and Fletcher Pratt
- Cover artist: D. K. Stone
- Language: English
- Series: Harold Shea
- Genre: Fantasy
- Publisher: Doubleday
- Publication date: 1975
- Publication place: United States
- Media type: Print (hardback)
- Pages: 341
- Followed by: Wall of Serpents

The Compleat Enchanter: The Magical Misadventures of Harold Shea is an omnibus collection of three fantasy stories by American writers L. Sprague de Camp and Fletcher Pratt, gathering material previously published in two volumes as The Incomplete Enchanter (1941) and The Castle of Iron (1950), the first two books in their Harold Shea series, with the essay "Fletcher and I", de Camp's paean to his deceased collaborator. The collection was first published in hardcover by Nelson Doubleday in 1975 as an offering for its Science Fiction Book Club, and was reissued in paperback by Del Rey Books in 1976. Minus the essay, it has more recently been combined with Wall of Serpents (1960), the third book of the series in the omnibus edition The Complete Compleat Enchanter (1989). This book had been left out of The Compleat Enchanter due to "considerations of space and …contractual considerations". The stories in the collection were originally published in the magazine Unknown in the issues for May and August 1940 and April 1941.

The Harold Shea stories are parallel world tales in which universes where magic works coexist with our own, and in which those based on the mythologies, legends, and literary fantasies of our world and can be reached by aligning one's mind to them by a system of symbolic logic. Psychologist Harold Shea and his colleagues Reed Chalmers, Walter Bayard, and Vaclav Polacek ("Votsy), travel to several such worlds, joined in the course of their adventures by Belphebe and Florimel of Faerie, who become the wives of Shea and Chalmers, and Pete Brodsky, a policeman who is accidentally swept up into the chaos. The three stories collected in The Compleat Enchanter explore the worlds of Norse mythology in "The Roaring Trumpet", Edmund Spenser's The Faerie Queene in "The Mathematics of Magic", and Ludovico Ariosto's Orlando Furioso (with a brief stop in Samuel Taylor Coleridge's Kubla Khan) in "The Castle of Iron".

== Contents ==
- "The Roaring Trumpet"
- "The Mathematics of Magic"
- "The Castle of Iron"
- "Afterword: Fletcher and I"

Preceded by none	Harold Shea Series; The Compleat Enchanter (= The Incomplete Enchanter and The Castle of Iron)	Succeeded by Wall of Serpents
