= Jack Coggins =

English painter (1911–2006)

Jack Banham Coggins
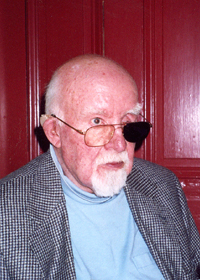
- Jack Coggins at age 91
- Born: July 10, 1911; London, England
- Died: January 30, 2006 (aged 94); Berks County, Pennsylvania, United States
- Occupations: Author, illustrator, and artist
- Spouse: Alma Wood (1948–2006)

Jack Banham Coggins (July 10, 1911 – January 30, 2006) was an artist, author, and illustrator. He is known in the United States for his oil paintings, which focused predominantly on marine subjects. He is also known for his books on space travel, which were both authored and illustrated by Coggins. Besides his own works, Coggins also provided illustrations for advertisements and magazine covers and articles.

During World War II, he served as an artist and correspondent for YANK magazine, capturing and conveying wartime scenes from the front lines. Over the course of his career, Coggins produced more than 1,000 paintings and taught art classes for 45 years. He retired in May 2001 and died at his home in Pennsylvania in January 2006.

== Biography ==
=== Early life ===
Coggins was born in London, England on July 10, 1911, the only child of Ethel May (née Dobby) and Sydney George Coggins. Sydney Coggins was Regimental Corporal Major of the First Regiment of Life Guards, the part of the Household Cavalry responsible for guarding the British Monarch; Jack Coggins was born in his father's barracks. During World War I, Sydney Coggins served with, and was commissioned by the regiment. After the war, he was appointed regimental Riding Master, but he was retired when the 1st and 2nd Life Guards were amalgamated into a single regiment under the Geddes Axe. A fellow officer, married to an American steel heiress, offered Sydney work as a secretary to his wife, and the Coggins family emigrated to Long Island, New York in 1923.

=== Education ===
While his father served with the Life Guards Regiment in France during World War I, Coggins and his mother lived with family in Folkestone, Kent. He attended the Imperial Service College, a public school preferred by army families. After moving to New York, Coggins enrolled at Roslyn High School in Roslyn Heights where he found difficulty in adjusting to the difference between military school in England and New York city public school. After graduation from Roslyn in 1928 at age 17, he enrolled in the New York City Grand Central School of Art and studied under Edmund Greacen, George Pearse Ennis, and Wayman Adams. In the early years, he painted advertising signs to support himself. With a grounding in fine art techniques, Coggins graduated to the Art Students League of New York, where he studied from 1933 to 1934 under noted artist Frank DuMond.

=== Marriage and later life ===
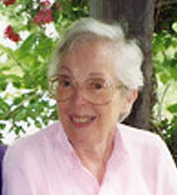
Alma Wood-Coggins—May 2002

While a member of the faculty of Hunter College in New York, Coggins met Alma Wood, a fashion and photographic model. They married in 1948 and moved to Pike Township, Berks County, Pennsylvania, where Coggins had purchased an old farm. Alma named their home "Crestfield," which, according to Jack, meant absolutely nothing.

Coggins taught his wife to paint, and she had success as an artist in her own right under the name Alma Woods. The couple would hold annual joint exhibitions for many years. Alma Coggins assisted her husband in the planning, research and typing of many of his books, and he acknowledged her efforts with book dedications to her.

He taught art classes at the Wyomissing Institute of the Arts from 1957 until 2001, despite being handicapped by the loss of his left eye due to infection after an operation.

Coggins was a signature member and Master Pastelist of the Pastel Society of America, a Fellow of the American Society of Marine Artists, a member of the American Ordnance Association, the U.S. Naval Institute, and an adviser to the boards of the Philadelphia Maritime Museum and the Reading Public Museum. He died at his home in Berks County, Pennsylvania at the age of 94 and willed his body to medical science. Alma Wood-Coggins died March 4, 2007. Jack and Alma Coggins had no children and were survived by several nieces and nephews.

== Illustrator, author and artist ==
=== Military illustrations of World War II ===
Fighting Ships of the U.S. Navy, by Fletcher Pratt, illustrated by Jack Coggins, cover art by Jack Coggins

Coggins's interest in sailing and maritime subjects began in London when he would sail model yachts on Round Pond in Kensington Gardens. This interest developed into a lifelong passion during his teens when he sailed small craft on Hempstead Harbor, near his new home on Long Island. During the early years of World War II, Coggins took a sampling of his war illustrations to Worthen Paxton, the art director of LIFE Magazine, who commissioned Coggins to produce a drawing of an imaginary coastal invasion of England. Coggins was paid $250 for that work, a large sum at the time, which paid his rent for five months. Appearing on July 15, 1940, this was the first of many war time illustrations for LIFE. Some of Coggins's works are in the Anne S. K. Brown Military Collection.

During the early 1940s, Coggins obtained more work producing war pictures for other magazines, including a series of double-page spreads for the controversial newspaper PM, and illustrations for The Saturday Evening Post. Throughout the war years, most of the output of many large corporations was reserved for materiel production; however, management were keen to promote their connection to the war effort and keep their name before the buying public until they could resume peacetime sales. Coggins received advertising commissions from such corporations including Elco, Koppers, US Steel, and Westinghouse. He also received commissions from the U.S. War Department for aircraft recognition charts, and he was intrigued to later find these charts used during his army basic training.

Because of the quality of his maritime illustrations, Coggins was invited by publisher Doubleday to provide artwork for a children's book about the U.S. Navy; the author being Fletcher Pratt, the well known military historian. Coggins was invited to participate in Pratt's Naval Game, based on a wargame developed by Fred T. Jane involving dozens of tiny wooden ships, built on a scale of one inch to fifty feet. These were spread over the floor of Pratt's apartment and their maneuvers were calculated via a complex mathematical formula. The result of Pratt and Coggins's first collaboration, published in 1941, was Fighting Ships of the U.S. Navy, a volume that described in text and illustrated in full color every class of ship in the Navy.

Coggins was called up for Army service, and enlisted on April 8, 1943. He was pulled from basic training at Fort Eustis, Virginia before he could complete it to work as an illustrator for YANK magazine. He was originally introduced to the Commanding Officer and Editor of YANK, Colonel Franklin Forsberg, by Fletcher Pratt. On May 20, 1943, Coggins commenced work at the head office of YANK in New York, where he worked until his departure for Britain. Jack Coggins became a naturalized citizen of the United States on August 19, 1943.

He served as an artist for British YANK in London until August 2, 1945, and was discharged from the U.S. Army on November 3, 1945. After serving as a Private for most of his time abroad, he finally made Corporal, and just before discharge, Sergeant. While in Britain, Coggins spent time on a Royal Navy convoy in the North Sea, witnessed the bombing of Saint-Lô, and flew over Berlin in a Lancaster bomber. He also spent time on a U.S. PT boat patrolling the beaches and made a trip into Brittany with an armored column. Events from all of these sorties were illustrated in YANK magazine in double page spreads.

Coggins was "bugged" by the fact that the Liberty Ship to which he had been assigned for the Normandy Landings got to Utah Beach only on D-Day plus one. He saw lively action, but bemoaned missing the big show. During his time in Britain, Coggins also wrote articles on war rockets and the German Navy which were published in YANK.

=== Science and science-fiction illustrations ===
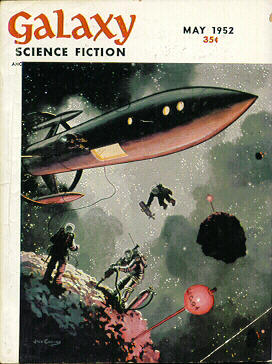
Coggins's painting "Mining an Asteroid" appeared on the cover of the May 1952 issue of Galaxy Science Fiction, his first SF magazine cover

During the late 1940s and early 1950s Coggins's marine art was featured on covers of Yachting Magazine and other publications, as well as on advertising material, and his science-fiction art illustrated covers for pulp science fiction magazines. These included Galaxy Science Fiction, The Magazine of Fantasy & Science Fiction and Thrilling Wonder Stories.

Due to reduced interest in his pre-war work, Coggins applied for a position teaching watercolor at Hunter College. He taught watercolor painting there from 1948 to 1952. In New York, as a result of his friendship with Fletcher Pratt, Coggins was introduced to the members of the Hydra Club, where he met Judith Merril and L. Ron Hubbard. Coggins was also invited to join Pratt's Trap Door Spiders club, where he became closely associated with L. Sprague de Camp and Isaac Asimov. The contact with such visionary thinkers complemented his exposure to the German V-2 rockets in Europe and served to strengthen his growing interest in space travel, rockets, and science fiction.

In 1951 and 1952, Coggins collaborated again with Fletcher Pratt on two classic books: Rockets, Jets, Guided Missiles & Space Ships, and By Space Ship to the Moon. The books were released amidst the great wave of interest in space travel sweeping the United States and the rest of the world in the 1950s, and they were published in several countries and translated into other languages. These books made the prospect of space exploration seem a practical possibility. National Aeronautics and Space Administration (NASA) scientists used the books to demonstrate their ideas to Congressmen when seeking funding for the space program, and there are many NASA scientists today who retain fond memories of the influence the books had on their careers.

=== Books ===
Between 1941 and 1983, Coggins wrote or illustrated 44 books on a wide range of marine, military, historical and educational themes. Among his more famous works is the 1962 authoring and illustration of Arms and Equipment of the Civil War. Dale E. Biever, registrar at the Civil War Library and Museum in Philadelphia, described the work as "not about generals or battles but about the things one should know before delving into those areas ... a welcome addition to any Civil War library." It was republished several times, most recently in 2004. In 1966, Coggins wrote and illustrated The Horseman's Bible, which sold over 500,000 copies with a revised edition published in 1984. In this book Coggins acknowledges his father "whose twenty five years in the cavalry and lifetime interest in horses made his advice invaluable." Coggins's last book was Marine Painter's Guide, which was first published in 1983. After the book was published, he decided to stop writing to concentrate more on painting. A new edition of Marine Painter's Guide was published in 2005 by Dover Publications, the publisher of new editions for several of his books.

=== Other paintings and illustrations ===
Tow Cast Off, oil painting by Jack Coggins

In 1968, Coggins was invited to undertake part of a voyage on the NOAA vessel USC&GS Discoverer (OSS-02) from Barbados and commissioned to paint several images of the ship and crew. Harris B. Stewart was the chief scientist who commissioned and personally paid for the artwork, which remained his personal property; Stewart was the author of the cited report.

Coggins relied on a realistic style that was executed in oils, for which he had a preference. However, he also painted works in water colors and other media. The majority of his paintings have a maritime theme, about which he wrote "It seems strange that with so much of the globe covered by water, so few artists know how to paint it." His stated preference in art styles was "a direct splashy type of realistic painting" and he admired the New Hope school of Redfield and Garber, with "no liking for 'modern art'".

A catalog listing well over 1000 works has been posthumously compiled by his relatives. A retrospective exhibition and sale of artworks found in Coggins's home after his death was held at the Wyomissing Institute of the Arts in late 2006. This consisted of about 300 previously unseen oils, watercolors, and other printed materials. An annual "Jack Coggins Award" to be given to a deserving local artist was financed from part of the proceeds from the sale of these works.

As of 2001, Coggins's paintings are owned by the Philadelphia Maritime Museum, the National Air and Space Museum of the Smithsonian Institution, the U.S. Navy, and the United States Coast Guard, among many other institutions, corporations, and private collectors. His original manuscripts and illustrations are part of The University of Southern Mississippi's Permanent Collection of outstanding authors and artists.

=== Recognition ===
Coggins's work has been accepted for show by the American Watercolor Society, the Salmagundi Club, the American Artist Professional League, and the Pastel Society of America. Coggins received a number of awards and accolades during his career, including the American Revolution Round Table Award in 1969, the Daniel Boone National Foundation's Americanism Award in 1985, the Mystic Maritime Gallery's Purchase Award in 1989, the International Maritime Exhibition's Rudolph Shaeffer Award from 1987 to 1990, and Berks Art Council's Pagoda Award in 1995. In 2000, he was inducted to the International Association of Astronomical Artists Hall of Fame as a Living Legend and celebrated master of the genre of Space Art.
