= Beyond Fantasy Fiction =

US fantasy fiction magazine (1953–1955)

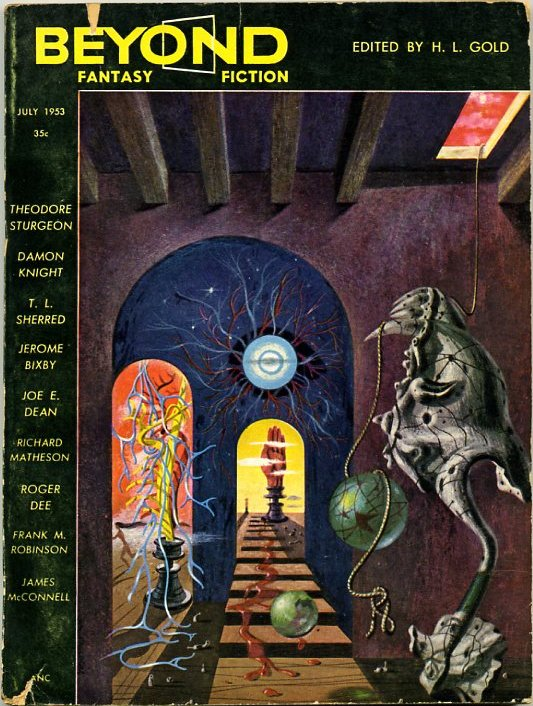
- The surrealist cover of Beyond Fantasy Fiction #1, July 1953 by Richard M. Powers
- Editor: H. L. Gold
- Categories: fantasy magazine
- Frequency: bimonthly
- Publisher: Robert Guinn
- First issue: July 1953
- Final issue Number: January, 1955; Volume 2 No 4
- Company: Galaxy Publishing Corporation
- Country: United States

Beyond Fantasy Fiction was a US fantasy fiction magazine edited by H. L. Gold, with only ten issues published from 1953 to 1955. The last two issues carried the cover title of Beyond Fiction, but the publication's name for copyright purposes remained as before.

Although not a commercial success, it included several short stories by authors such as Isaac Asimov, Ray Bradbury and Philip K. Dick. The publication has been described by critics as a successor to the tradition of Unknown, a fantasy magazine that ceased publication in 1943. It was noted for printing fantasy with a rational basis such as werewolf stories that included scientific explanations. A selection of stories from Beyond was published in paperback form in 1963, also under the title Beyond.

James E. Gunn, a historian of science fiction, regarded the magazine as the best of the fantasy magazines launched in the early 1950s, and science fiction encyclopedist Donald H. Tuck contended it printed very good material. Not every critic viewed Beyond as completely successful, however; P. Schuyler Miller, in a 1963 review, commented that the stories were most successful when they did not try to emulate Unknown.

== History and significance ==
Beyond Fantasy Fiction was a fantasy-oriented companion to the more successful Galaxy Science Fiction, which launched in 1950; Beyond had been planned by editor H. L. Gold from the time Galaxy was launched, but it had to wait until Galaxy was firmly established. Beyond's first issue, dated July 1953, included an editorial by Gold in which he laid out the magazine's scope, excluding (in his words) only "the probably possible" and "the unentertaining". Gold recruited Sam Merwin, who had recently quit as editor of Fantastic Universe, to help in editing, though the masthead of both magazines listed Gold as editor. A typical issue of Beyond included several stories that were long enough to be listed as novellas or novelettes, with the contents augmented with shorter works, usually for a total of at least seven stories.

The first issue featured Theodore Sturgeon, Damon Knight, Frank M. Robinson, and Richard Matheson. Other writers who appeared in the magazine included Jerome Bixby, John Wyndham, James E. Gunn, Fredric Brown, Frederik Pohl (both under his own name and with Lester del Rey under the joint pseudonym "Charles Satterfield"), Philip José Farmer, Randall Garrett, Zenna Henderson, and Algis Budrys.

Isaac Asimov's signature at the end of his story "Kid Stuff" in the September 1953 issue

Five of the ten covers were surrealist, which was an unusual artistic choice for a genre magazine. The cover painting for the first issue was by Richard M. Powers; Gold was one of the very few American magazine editors to use his work, though Powers was prolific in providing artwork for paperback covers. In addition to Powers, René Vidmer and Arthur Krusz (among others) contributed cover art. The magazine also carried interior artwork, usually multiple illustrations, for almost every story; in addition, each story included a facsimile of the author's signature, set at the end of the text. The best-known interior artist Beyond used was Ed Emshwiller, though there were several other regular artists. The magazine carried almost no non-fiction, though there were occasional "filler" pieces to occupy spaces at the end of stories. The publication contained no book reviews, and only the first issue carried an editorial.

The magazine was not commercially successful: at that time circulation figures were not required to be published annually, as they were later, so the actual circulation figures are not known. However, Fred Pohl, who was editor of Galaxy Publishing Co. from 1960-1969, stated in 1967 that the magazine showed a loss of $40,000 (equivalent to $386,228 in 2025) during its publication. Its demise after less than two years can be attributed in part to the decreasing popularity of fantasy and horror fiction. In a 1958 advertisement in Galaxy for complete sets of the magazine for $3.50, the publisher described Beyond as "a princely experiment to determine whether there were enough readers to support a truly handsome, fantastically high-quality fantasy fiction magazine. There weren't, and so BEYOND had to cease publication after ten (10) hang-the-expense issues."

== Reception ==
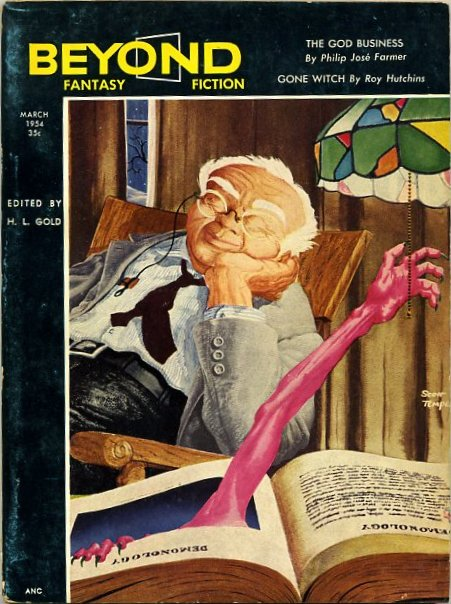
March 1954 issue of Beyond Fantasy Fiction. Cover art by Scott Templar.

According to science-fiction historian Donald H. Tuck, Beyond published "some very good material," with appearances by many well-known authors, and the magazine is often cited as being the successor to the unusual fantasy tradition of Unknown. Author James Gunn said of the new fantasy magazines that appeared in the 1950s that "the best of these was Beyond, created by Horace Gold as a companion fantasy magazine to Galaxy, which he had created three years before. Beyond Fantasy Fiction aimed at the same rationalized fantasy niche that Unknown had established and to which Gold had contributed stories." Not everyone thought the magazine was completely successful in emulating Unknown, however; P. Schuyler Miller, reviewing an anthology drawn from the pages of Beyond, was generally approving but commented that "Except for Budrys, Pohl, Brown and Sturgeon, these stories from Beyond are rather self-conscious. They are best when they are not trying to be like Unknown." Miller's assessment of the magazine overall was that it "made a pass at the same position [as Unknown] but didn't make it."

Beyond's selection of stories has been described by science fiction historian Michael Ashley as "seeking to achieve … high quality fantasy fiction acceptable to all readers"; he adds that Beyond was more artistically successful than Fantastic, a competitor in this niche, because Gold "had a clearer vision and was more determined … to achieve it. … despite sales problems, Gold persisted in publishing fiction that sought to stretch the boundaries of imagination."

Several significant or widely reprinted stories appeared during Beyond's short history:

- "…And My Fear Is Great…", by Theodore Sturgeon (July 1953)
- "The Wall Around the World", by Theodore R. Cogswell (September 1953)
- "Kid Stuff", by Isaac Asimov (September 1953)
- "The Watchful Poker Chip", by Ray Bradbury (March 1954). Generally reprinted under the title "The Watchful Poker Chip of H. Matisse"
- "Sine of the Magus", by James E. Gunn (May 1954)
- "The Green Magician", by L. Sprague de Camp and Fletcher Pratt (November 1954). Part of the Incompleat Enchanter series
- "Upon the Dull Earth", by Philip K. Dick (November 1954)

Although no Hugo Awards were presented in 1954, the 2004 World Science Fiction Convention awarded "Retro Hugos" for that year. Two Beyond stories appeared as runners-up: Sturgeon's "…And My Fear Is Great…" placed third in the novella category, and Cogswell's "The Wall Around the World" fifth in the novelette category. In addition, Gold placed fifth in the editor category, though this recognized his work at Galaxy as well as at Beyond.

== Bibliographic details ==
The publisher was Galaxy Publishing Corporation, New York. The magazine was initially titled Beyond Fantasy Fiction, and this remained the title on the masthead throughout the ten-issue run. However, issue 9 changed the title to simply Beyond Fiction on the cover, spine, and table of contents. Issue 10 used the new, shorter title on the cover and spine, but reverted to Beyond Fantasy Fiction for the table of contents. As a result, the magazine is often listed as having changed its name for the last two issues.

The magazine began as a 160-page digest, priced at 35 cents. The price stayed the same throughout the run, but the page count was cut to 128 for the eighth issue, September 1954. The magazine was bimonthly, but issues 9 and 10 did not carry month and year dates, which has led different bibliographers to catalogue them in different ways. However, the masthead for these issues indicates that the magazine remained bimonthly, and so they are now usually catalogued as November 1954 and January 1955, respectively; the copyright dates on the last two issues correspond to these dates. The volume numbering was completely regular; volume 1 had six numbers, and volume 2 ceased with its fourth number. The stories were printed in the two-column format usual to digest magazines.

A British edition of the magazine ran for four issues on a bimonthly schedule starting in November 1953 and finishing in May 1954. These copied the first four issues of the US version, with slightly cut contents. They were numbered 1 to 4 but were not dated. Ten years after the magazine folded, nine stories from Beyond were collected into the 160-page paperback Beyond, published in 1963 by Berkley Books (F712) and edited by Thomas Dardis (who was not credited on the book).

== Sources ==
- Ashley, Michael (1976). The History of the Science Fiction Magazine Vol. 3 1946–1955. Chicago: Contemporary Books, Inc. ISBN 0-8092-7842-1.
- Ashley, Michael (1978). The History of the Science Fiction Magazine Part 4 1956–1965. London: New English Library. ISBN 0-450-03438-0.
- Ashley, Mike (2005). Transformations: The Story of the Science Fiction Magazines from 1950 to 1970. Liverpool: Liverpool University Press. ISBN 0-85323-779-4.
- Nicholls, Peter (1979). The Encyclopedia of Science Fiction. St Albans: Granada Publishing. ISBN 0-586-05380-8.
- Clute, John; Nicholls, Peter (1993). The Encyclopedia of Science Fiction. New York: St. Martin's Press, Inc. ISBN 0-312-09618-6.
- Tuck, Donald H. (1982). The Encyclopedia of Science Fiction and Fantasy: Volume 3. Chicago: Advent: Publishers, Inc. ISBN 0-911682-26-0.
