= Double in Space =

- First American edition cover
- Author: Fletcher Pratt
- Cover artist: Richard Powers
- Language: English
- Genre: Science fiction
- Publisher: Doubleday
- Publication date: 1951
- Publication place: United States
- Media type: Print (hardcover)
- Pages: 217 pp

Double in Space
- cover of 1st British edition
- Author: Fletcher Pratt
- Language: English
- Genre: Science fiction
- Publisher: T. V. Boardman
- Publication date: 1954
- Publication place: United Kingdom
- Media type: Print (hardcover)
- Pages: 222 pp

Double in Space is a title used for two distinct collections of science fiction novellas by Fletcher Pratt, one published in the United States and the other in the United Kingdom. The two collections have one story in common.

== American publication ==
The American version of Double in Space was originally published in hardcover by Doubleday in 1951, and issued in paperback by Curtis Books in 1969. The dust jacket for the Doubleday edition was illustrated by Richard Powers. It included two stories:

- "Project Excelsior" (Thrilling Wonder Stories 1951)
- "The Wanderer’s Return" (Thrilling Wonder Stories 1951)

"Project Excelsior" was originally published under the title "Asylum Satellite".

=== Reception ===
P. Schuyler Miller reported the collection to be "good reading and good fun."

== British publication ==
The UK version of Double in Space was published by T. V. Boardman in hardcover in 1954. It also included two stories:

- "Project Excelsior" (Thrilling Wonder Stories 1951)
- "The Conditioned Captain" (Startling Stories 1953)

By the time of its inclusion in the UK version of Double in Space, "The Conditioned Captain" had already been expanded by Pratt into the separate novel The Undying Fire (1953).
