= A Wizard in Rhyme =

Fantasy novel series by Christopher Stasheff

A Wizard in Rhyme is a series of fantasy novels by American writer Christopher Stasheff. The series follows the character of Matthew Mantrell, an English literature Ph.D. student, who is transported to a magical world where poetry is used to cast spells. There his knowledge of poetry, gained through his literature studies, establishes him as a powerful wizard and positions him as "lord wizard of the realm". The series consists of eight novels, and is said to have hints of L. Sprague de Camp and Fletcher Pratt.

A Wizard in Rhyme takes place in an alternate history of medieval Europe, featuring several geographical differences (most notably a land-bridge connecting Britain to the mainland) and two major supernatural differences: the existence of magic, which can be influenced by the speaking of rhymed verse; and the established and real presence of the Christian God and Devil, leading to a prevalence of Christian thought and morality.

== Geography ==
The following are domains of the realms covered in the novel, with the approximate geographical counterparts in the real world.

- Merovence: (France) When introduced in Book 1, it was ruled by recent usurper Astaulf, who shared power with his sorcerer-henchman Malingo. Merovence was, at the time, the last bastion of morality and Christianity within Europe, as its rightful ruler, the uncrowned Princess Alisande, was still devoted to good. Its patron saint, Saint Moncaire, took action to save it from destruction: he sent a magic spell, encrypted in the language of Merovence, out into the other universes; the first person to interpret it would be drawn into Merovence and help in the crusade against evil. That man was Matthew Mantrell. Its name is probably derived from the Merovingian line or from Merovech, and its capital is called Bordestang.
- Ibile: (Spain/Portugal) When introduced in Book 2, it was ruled by sorcerer-king Gordogrosso, and then by Prince Rinaldo after The Gross One's defeat. The name Ibile seems to have been derived from Iberia, and its capital is called Orlequedrille.
- Allustria: (Germany/Austria) When introduced in Book 3, it was ruled by the witch-queen Suettay, and an army of scribes in an extensive bureaucratic network. The name Allustria is either derived from Allemagne (French for Germany) combined with Austria or Austrasia.
- Latruria: (Italy) When introduced in Book 4, it was ruled an evil sorcerer-king who was succeeded by his grandson, Boncorro. The name Latruria seems to have been derived from Latium combined with Etruria. Its capital is Venarra.
- Bretanglia: (Britain) When introduced in Book 6, it was ruled by an ambitious king who was succeeded by Prince John then King Brion. The name Bretanglia seems to have been derived from Britain and Anglia, the medieval Latin name for England. Its capital is Dunlimon (a near-anagram of Londinium).
- Erin: (Ireland) also known as the 'Isle of Doctors and Saints' in many of the previous books. Not much is known about Erin, other than druids live there. The name Erin is another name for Ireland.

Note: There are some inconsistencies with the actual name of Britain and Ireland in the series. In book 4, Matthew mentions that the countries England, Scotland and Ireland are respectively named "Angland", "Scotia" and "Erie", yet in Book 6 Britain is called "Bretanglia," and Ireland, "Erin." However, this may be Stasheff making reference to England and Scotland when referring to Angland and Scotia respectively, while Bretanglia refers to Great Britain as a whole.

== Novels ==
- Her Majesty's Wizard (1986)
- The Oathbound Wizard (1993)
- The Witch Doctor (1994)
- The Secular Wizard (1995)
- My Son, the Wizard (1997)
- The Haunted Wizard (1999)
- The Crusading Wizard (2000)
- The Feline Wizard (2000)

== Main characters ==
- Matthew "Matt" Mantrell: A PhD student who, through reading some odd runes, stumbled into a magical world similar to his original Earth homeland. The geography of the new world is similar to Matt's home world, and even shares some common history. By accident, he discovered he could perform magic in the new world by reciting rhymes. Royal Consort to Alisande and Royal Wizard.
- Alisande: The rightful ruler of Merovence.
- Sir Guy de Toutarien: Alias Sir Guy Losobal. A brave and upright knight and epitome of romantic knight in feudal age. He hides the fact that he is a descendant of Hardishane, a hero in the past who fought evil and established an Empire for goodness and order. Married to the Lady Yverne.
- Stegoman: A fire-breathing dragon, befriended and cured by Matthew.
- Saul Delacroix Bremner: Alias The Witch Doctor. One of Matthew's fellow students. Brought to Matthew's world by the Spider King to aid in the overthrow of Allustria.
- Ramon Mantrell Matthew's father, a shopkeeper and scholar and thus a powerful wizard in his own right, along with his wife.
