= The Enchanter Reborn =

1992 anthology edited by L. Sprague de Camp and Christopher Stasheff

- first edition of The Enchanter Reborn
- Author: L. Sprague de Camp and Christopher Stasheff
- Language: English
- Series: Harold Shea
- Genre: Fantasy
- Publisher: Baen Books
- Publication date: 1992
- Publication place: United States
- Media type: Print (paperback)
- Pages: 296
- ISBN: 0-671-72134-8
- OCLC: 26468405
- Preceded by: Wall of Serpents
- Followed by: The Exotic Enchanter

The Enchanter Reborn is an anthology of five fantasy short stories edited by American writers L. Sprague de Camp and Christopher Stasheff, the first volume in their continuation of the Harold Shea series by de Camp and Fletcher Pratt. It was first published in paperback by Baen Books in 1992; an ebook edition followed from the same publisher in May 2013. The book has also been translated into Italian. All but one of the pieces are original to the anthology; the exception, de Camp's "Sir Harold and the Gnome King", first appeared in the World Fantasy Convention program book in 1990 and was then published as a separate chapbook in 1991.

== The series ==
De Camp and Pratt's original Harold Shea stories are parallel world tales in which universes where magic works coexist with our own, and in which those based on the mythologies, legends, and literary fantasies of our world and can be reached by aligning one's mind to them by a system of symbolic logic. In these stories psychologist Harold Shea and his colleagues Reed Chalmers, Walter Bayard, and Vaclav Polacek (called "Votsy", a nickname derived from the Czech pronunciation of Vaclav, approx.: VAHTs-lahff), travel to a number of such worlds. In the course of their travels other characters are added to the main cast, including Belphebe and Florimel, who become the wives of Shea and Chalmers, and Pete Brodsky, a policeman who is accidentally swept up into the chaos.

== The book ==
In The Enchanter Reborn the series is opened up into a shared world to which other authors were invited to contribute. In addition to stories by de Camp and Stasheff, who collectively oversaw the project, it includes contributions by Holly Lisle and John Maddox Roberts, both of whom worked from outlines provided by the editors. The initial impulse for the continuation may have been the successful adaptation of the characters into a gamebook adventure (Prospero's Isle, by Tom Wham, published by Tor Books in October 1987), to which de Camp had contributed an admiring introduction. This may have encouraged him to wrap up long-unresolved loose ends from the original series, such as the stranding of Walter Bayard in the world of Irish mythology, and to resolve the unaddressed complication introduced by L. Ron Hubbard's "borrowing" of Harold Shea for use in his novel The Case of the Friendly Corpse. Both of these goals he accomplished in "Sir Harold and the Gnome King" (1990 chapbook). When the decision was made to continue the series further this story was revised slightly to reconcile it with the other new stories, though the fit is somewhat awkward.

== Summary ==
Once the loose ends are resolved, most of the action in the second sequence involves Shea and Chalmers' quest across several universes to rescue Florimel, who has been kidnapped by the malevolent enchanter Malambroso. Milieus encountered in the stories of The Enchanter Reborn include the worlds of Irish myth and of Ludovico Ariosto's epic poem the Orlando furioso from the original series, revisited in "Professor Harold and the Trustees," L. Ron Hubbard's setting from The Case of the Friendly Corpse and L. Frank Baum's land of Oz in "Sir Harold and the Gnome King," the world of Taoist legend as portrayed in Wú Chéng'ēn's classic Chinese novel Journey to the West in "Sir Harold and the Monkey King," the romantic fantasies of Miguel de Cervantes' Don Quixote (with the unique twist of its being Quixote's version of reality rather than Cervantes') in "Knight and the Enemy," and Virgil's Graeco-Roman epic the Aeneid in "Arms and the Enchanter." The last two stories appear to have been transposed as published; the opening sequence of "Knight and the Enemy" refers to Shea and Chalmers as having just come from the world of the Aeneid, which is the setting of the story following it in the collection.

== Contents ==
- "Professor Harold and the Trustees" (1992) (Christopher Stasheff)
- "Sir Harold and the Gnome King" (1990) (L. Sprague de Camp)
- "Sir Harold and the Monkey King" (1992) (Christopher Stasheff)
- "Knight and the Enemy" (1992) (Holly Lisle, from an outline by de Camp and Stasheff)
- "Arms and the Enchanter" (1992) (John Maddox Roberts, from an outline by de Camp and Stasheff)

== Sequel ==
The Enchanter Reborn was followed up by a sequel anthology, The Exotic Enchanter (1995), which featured more stories by de Camp and Stasheff, together with additional new authors.

== Notes ==
Preceded by Wall of Serpents	Harold Shea Series; The Enchanter Reborn	Succeeded by The Exotic Enchanter
