= The Warlock in Spite of Himself =

1969 science fantasy novel by Christopher Stasheff

- First edition cover art by Jack Gaughan
- Author: Christopher Stasheff
- Cover artist: Jack Gaughan
- Language: English
- Series: Warlock of Gramarye
- Genre: Science fantasy
- Publisher: Ace Books
- Publication date: 1969
- Publication place: United States
- Media type: Print (hardback & paperback)
- Pages: 184
- ISBN: 0-441-00560-8

The Warlock in Spite of Himself is a science fantasy novel by American author Christopher Stasheff, published in 1969. It is the first book in hisWarlock of Gramarye series. The title is a play on the title of Molière's Le Médecin malgré lui (The Doctor, in Spite of Himself).

Written during the Vietnam War, Stasheff's novel thinly veiled his commentary about the proper uses of government and democracy in a fantasy about interstellar travel, fairies, unusual flora and refugees fleeing persecution.

== Plot ==
The novel centers around Rod Gallowglass, a SCENT agent (Society for the Conversion of Extraterrestrial Nascent Totalitarianisms), who stumbles across the planet Gramarye. Immediately upon landing he is thrust into a world of medieval people, witches and warlocks, and all manner of mythical creatures. Rod is aided by his faithful companion FCC (Faithful Cybernetic Companion, pronounced "Fess"), a slightly glitchy AI disguised as a horse. While gathering intelligence, Rod discovers the planet is in political turmoil, due to futurian influence on behalf of the Proletarian Eclectic State of Terra (PEST) and VETO organizations who plan to corrupt the planet away from democracy, which Rod plans to bring to the planet, due to the planet's importance to the future of the Decentralized Democratic Tribunal (DDT). The three main factions are the Monarchy led by Queen Catherine, the beggars led by Tuan Loguire, and the Noble Lords eventually led by Anselm Loguire.

Unfortunately for Rod when going to an inn for the night he is attacked by Big Tom. Rod defeats him, almost too easily, and Big Tom becomes a squire for Rod. Shortly thereafter the "wee people", who saw him land, declare him a warlock and put him to a test to determine if he is good or evil by forcing him to fight a werewolf. Upon defeating it, with garlic sausage, he is returned to the inn he was staying at. The next day Rod and Tom head to Catherine's castle to get themselves positions as soldiers. To do this however Rod is caught up in a fight with Brom O'Berin, a dwarf who is advisor to the Queen. Though defeated, Rod is permitted to join the Queen under the promise to solve the mystery of the Banshee which is continuously spotted upon the castle battlements. Rod discovers it is a hologram machine set upon the castle roof; he quickly disables it and is sent out for his next mission.

Rod is then sent to gain intelligence on the Lords who have assembled at the fortress of Duke Loguire. On his way to the fortress Rod encounters a witch of his own age named Gwendylon. Gwen and Rod fall in love but Big Tom tells Rod he should stay away from her. Passing themselves off as minstrels, Rod and Big Tom gain entrance to the fortress and find the old Duke losing his grasp on the other lords. Rod discovers each lord has a new advisor, who are all PEST agents. Rod seeks more answers by exploring the haunted areas of the fortress, where he encounters ghosts. Thanks to Fess the ghosts give up trying to stop Rod and allow him free access. Rod discovers a passageway behind the Duke's seat in the great hall, which he later uses to save the Duke when the lords turn on him. However the ghosts discover that Gwen had followed Rod and return her to him. Upon saving the Duke, who is then replaced by his son Anselm, they make their escape into the forest and back to the Queen's castle. However, not having the full story, the Queen imprisons the old Duke Loguire for high treason and attempts to imprison Rod and Tom for aiding him until Brom comes to their aid and Catherine lets them free.

Events soon take a turn for the worse when Rod finds himself betrayed by Big Tom, who is revealed to be a VETO agent from the future. Rod is imprisoned in a local inn VETO is headquartered at, called the House of Clovis, with some very unlikely cell mates. Tuan Loguire had been betrayed by the VETO leader in the House named the Mocker, and Big Tom, having had second thoughts about betraying Rod, was also thrown in jail. While in jail the Mocker's plan is unveiled that he, with his lieutenants armed with futuristic guns, would throw the country into anarchy. In an escape plan Rod contacts Fess for help who in turn calls for Gwen who had been hiding with Fess. Gwen calls the elves for help who in turn send the Prince of Elves to break Rod out. To Rod's surprise the Prince of Elves turns out to be Brom O'Berin. Rod, Brom, Tuan, and Tom return to the castle to form a plan to overthrow the Mocker. Though at the castle tensions are high between Tuan and Catherine.

Rod, Tom and Tuan return to the House of Clovis with their plan to kill the Mocker. They succeed and the beggars are united under Queen Catherine. With their new forces assembled Catherine's forces march out to confront the Lords. A great battle ensues but Rod notices the advisors, led by Durer (Anselm's advisor), are building a large weapon to quickly decimate the Royal army. However the advisors are wielding energy swords and Big Tom, in an attempt to kill Durer, is killed. Rod, having witnessed Tom's death, rides with haste wielding a blaster from Fess's saddle and kills Durer.

After the battle, with Rod's intervention, Tuan and Catherine are married. Rod sent a message to SCENT stating that he was quitting to stay on Gramarye with Gwen, but quickly receives a message back requesting he stay on as the permanent SCENT agent of Gramarye. He immediately proposes to Gwen but she refuses to let him kiss her until he admits he is a warlock, and Rod then for the first time states that he IS a warlock.(Due to his awakening psionic powers)

== Characters ==
- Rod Gallowglass (Rodney d'Armand) is the main protagonist in the series. Born to a family of aristocrats, Rod left his home planet for adventure as a SCENT (Society for Conversion of Extraterrestrial Nascent Totalitarianisms) agent seeking out lost colonies with the help of the family robot.
- Fess (FCC #651919) is Rod's faithful robot companion throughout the book. Fess is essentially a robotic brain capable of being transferred from computer to computer (as such he can be used as the sole computer of Rod's ship). Fess spends the majority of the series in a robotic horse suit disguise. Fess's most interesting quality is his form of epilepsy. This epilepsy is due to a weak capacitor which will become strained causing it to release all its stored energy in a single wave causing his "seizure". Fess was approximately two thousand years old when Rod was born.
- Big Tom is an anarchist agent from VETO (Vigilant Exterminators of Telepathic Organisms) sent from the future to aid in the plan to pull Gramarye into a totalitarian model. Big Tom is befriended by Rod, eventually siding with Rod over his own agents and fought alongside the Queen's army in the final battle, inevitably being killed by Durer. A central point of the story is Rods developing psionic power, nascent until he landed on Gramarye.

== Sequels and spinoffs ==
The success of the initial volume led to a 1971 sequel called King Kobold, the first of what would eventually become a complex series of sequels and related works. In 1982, Ace Books published The Warlock Unlocked, in which the Gallowglass family accidentally go through a portal to an alternate universe, where magic really works. The success of this novel led to the publication of the 1983 Escape Velocity, a prequel to the original series, recounting the events leading to the colonisation of Gramarye by members of the Society for Creative Anachronism. In rapid succession, these were followed by King Kobold Revived (1984) (a rewrite of King Kobold); The Warlock Enraged (1985); The Warlock Wandering and The Warlock is Missing (both 1986); The Warlock Heretical (1987); The Warlock's Companion (1988); The Warlock Insane (1989); and The Warlock Rock (1990).

=== Warlock's Heirs ===
The 1991 Warlock and Son, centered on Rod's eldest son Magnus, led to a spin-off series of sorts about the children of the Gallowglass family. These are put by the publisher into a separate Warlock's Heirs series, and include A Wizard in Absentia (1993); M'Lady Witch (1994); Quicksilver's Knight (1995); The Spell-Bound Scholar (1999); Here Be Monsters (2001); and The Warlock's Last Ride (2004)

=== Rogue Wizard books ===
Stasheff's 1979 novel A Wizard in Bedlam, written before most of the Warlock series, is set in the same universe, but is set on the planet Melange and involves the character Gar Pike, alias Magnus d'Armand. This was followed in 1995, with the novels A Wizard in Mind, A Wizard in War, A Wizard in Peace, A Wizard in Chaos (1997), A Wizard in Midgard (1998), A Wizard and a Warlord (2000), A Wizard in the Way (2000), and A Wizard in a Feud (2001)

=== Interlacing ===
Stasheff gradually began to interlace the two series, with the story of the Rogue Wizard being continued in 2004 in The Warlock's Last Ride of the 'Warlock's Heirs' series. During the same period was the 2003 Mind Out of Time, a collection of short stories, mostly set in the Warlock universe; and the 2005 episodic novel Saint Vidicon to the Rescue, recounting the fate of Saint Vidicon of Cathode after his martyrdom, and of a devout computer programmer who becomes his agent in the human world.

== Additional sources ==
- Barron, Neil, ed. (1999). Fantasy and Horror: A Critical Guide to Literature, Illustration, Film, TV, Radio and the Internet. Lanham, Maryland: The Scarecrow Press, Inc. p. 403. ISBN 0-8108-3596-7.
- Clute, John; John Grant, eds. (1997). The Encyclopedia of Fantasy. New York: St. Martin's Press. p. 894. ISBN 978-0-312-19869-5.
- Clute, John; Nicholls, Peter, eds. (May 10, 2019). "Christopher Stasheff entry". The Encyclopedia of Science Fiction. New York: St. Martin's Griffin. p. 1160. ISBN 978-0-312-13486-0.
- Review of The Warlock in Spite of Himself by del Rey, Lester (December 1969), "Reading Room", If, 19 (10): 92
