= The Castle of Iron =

Novel by Fletcher Pratt and L. Sprague de Camp

- First edition
- Author: L. Sprague de Camp and Fletcher Pratt
- Cover artist: Hannes Bok
- Language: English
- Series: Harold Shea
- Genre: Fantasy
- Publisher: Gnome Press
- Publication date: 1941, 1950
- Publication place: United States
- Media type: Print (Hardback)
- Pages: 224
- Preceded by: The Incomplete Enchanter
- Followed by: Wall of Serpents

The Castle of Iron is a fantasy novella by the American authors L. Sprague de Camp and Fletcher Pratt, and of the novel into which it was later expanded by the same authors. It was the third story (and afterwards the second volume) in their Harold Shea series.

As a 35,000-word novella it was first published in the fantasy magazine Unknown for April, 1941. The revised and expanded novel version was first published in hardcover by Gnome Press in 1950, and in paperback by Pyramid Books in 1962. The book has been reprinted by a number of other publishers since its first appearance. An e-book edition was published by Gollancz's SF Gateway imprint on September 29, 2011 as part of a general release of de Camp's works in electronic form. The novel has been combined with other books in the series in the omnibus editions The Compleat Enchanter (1975), The Complete Compleat Enchanter (1989) and The Mathematics of Magic: The Enchanter Stories of L. Sprague de Camp and Fletcher Pratt (2007). It has also been translated into Italian.

The Harold Shea stories are parallel world tales in which universes where magic works coexist with our own, and in which those based on the mythologies, legends, and literary fantasies of our world and can be reached by aligning one's mind to them by a system of symbolic logic. In The Castle of Iron, the authors' protagonist Harold Shea visits two such worlds, first (briefly) that of Samuel Taylor Coleridge's poem "Kubla Khan" and second that of Ludovico Ariosto's epic, the Orlando Furioso.

== Plot summary ==
In the wake of the events of "The Mathematics of Magic", Harold Shea and his lady love Belphebe of Faerie have married and settled happily into a mundane earthly existence. But after Belphebe disappears at a picnic, Shea is questioned by the police on suspicion of foul play. The authorities also question his colleagues at the Garaden Institute, Walter Bayard and Vaclav Polacek, and then decide to take in the three of them for further interrogation. At that point the whole group, including police officer Pete Brodsky, are spirited away to another world, that of the Xanadu which is the subject of Samuel Taylor Coleridge's poem "Kubla Khan". After they have all languished there for a time, Shea and Polacek are pulled away from this world as well and into that represented by Ludovico Ariosto's epic, the Orlando Furioso.

The person responsible for their plight turns out to be Reed Chalmers, aspiring magician and former head of the Garaden Institute, who had accompanied Shea to Faerie in his previous adventure. He had been attempting to retrieve Shea alone, but had erroneously pulled in Belphebe first, and then misplaced his three colleagues and the police officer before at last getting things (nearly) right. Aside, that is, from getting Polacek too and leaving Bayard and Brodsky stranded in Xanadu. Moreover, as Ariosto's epic was a source text for Edmund Spenser's The Faerie Queene, Belphebe's mind has become confused, reverting in accord with the setting to that of her Furioso prototype, Belphagor. As a result, she now believes herself a native of the world into which they have been plunged, no longer recognizing Shea as her husband.

Chalmer's goal was to seek Shea's assistance in transforming his own love, the lady Florimel, a human simulacrum magically made of snow, into a real person. It was also to that end that he himself had come to this world, where he is now the guest of the wizard Atlantès de Carena in the latter's marvelous iron castle in northern Spain. The world of the Furioso is based on Carolingian legend, and the Moorish Spain in which the extradimensional travelers find themselves is in the midst of a conflict with the Frankish empire of Charlemagne and his paladins. Somehow they must manage to negotiate their way through the delicate international politics, tiptoe around the treacherous Atlantès, achieve Chalmers' ambitions for Florimel, restore Belphebe's sanity — and survive. Beyond that there are still Bayard and Brodsky to rescue, though those are tasks for later tales.

== Reception ==
Reviewing the 1950 edition, Boucher and McComas faulted the novel for weakness in plotting, but described the series as "a high point in the application of sternest intellectual logic to screwball fantasy". P. Schuyler Miller, despite finding that Castle "hasn't quite the adroitness of incongruity which marked the first book", still reviewed it favorably, saying the authors "learnedly but irreverently wreak the same havoc with Ariosto that they did with Spenser's Faerie Queene and the Norse eddas".

Damon Knight characterized the series as "relaced, ribald adventure . . . priceless," saying that "no fantasy reader should be without them." In 1977, Richard A. Lupoff described the series as "whole planes above the hackneyed gut-spillers and skull-smashers that pass for heroic fantasy."

Science fiction editor and critic David Pringle rated The Castle of Iron as one of the hundred best fantasy novels in 1988.

== Sources ==
- Laughlin, Charlotte; Daniel J. H. Levack (1983). De Camp: An L. Sprague de Camp Bibliography. San Francisco: Underwood/Miller. pp. 30–31, 135.

Preceded by The Incomplete Enchanter	Harold Shea Series; The Castle of Iron	Succeeded by Wall of Serpents
