= Tom Wham =

American game designer and artist (born 1944)

- Born: 1944 (age 81–82); Chester, Illinois, United States
- Known for: Fantasy art, Illustration
- Website: www.tomwham.com

Tom Wham (born 1944) is a designer of board games who has also produced artwork, including that for his own games.

== Career ==
=== Early life and Guidon Games ===
Born in Chester, Illinois, Wham worked a variety of odd jobs during his early adult life. After serving four years as a radioman in the U.S. Navy, he worked for the Guidon Games hobby shop in Maine where he got his first game, a variant on a Civil War naval miniatures campaign, published. One of Wham's books was published in the same series of "Wargaming with Miniatures" books from Guidon Games that began in 1971 with Chainmail. In 1972, Wham got a job with Don Lowry at Guidon Games, in the shipping/layout department of Campaign magazine; there, he co-authored a set of Civil War naval miniature rules, Ironclad. Afterwards he became a prison guard in his hometown, then held an office job in Denver.

=== TSR ===
In May 1977 he began working for TSR, Inc. at their Lake Geneva, Wisconsin headquarters as a general office worker, the company's 13th employee. After running the Dungeon Hobby Shop for a summer, he was moved upstairs to the company's art department. Wham worked with Dave Sutherland and his brother-in-law Dave Trampier on the original Monster Manual. Wham began doing some creative work for the company, contributing a handful of illustrations for the original AD&D Monster Manual, including the creature called the beholder. Other work included co-editing (with Timothy Jones, Mike Carr, and Brian Blume) the first edition of Gamma World. He also made a deal with Tim Kask, editor of The Dragon, to do a game in the centerfold, called Snit Smashing; this led to other games in Dragon, including The Awful Green Things from Outer Space. These games, printed on cardstock and included in the centerfold of the magazine, usually featured artwork supplied by Wham.

Notable games published this way include:

- Snit Smashing: Originally published in Dragon #10 (October 1977). In Wham's first game for Dragon, tiny creatures known as Snits run out from the sea and try to procreate while avoiding the giant blob-like Bolotomi, who smash the Snits out of boredom. Players alternate control between the Snits and the Bolotomus, attempting to make their own Snits reproduce faster than those of their opponent.
- Snit's Revenge: Originally published in Dragon #11 (December 1977). In the more famous follow-up to Snit Smashing, the Snits set out to finally kill the elephantine Bolotomi who are smashing them, by invading their bodies and shutting down all their internal organs. This was published as a separate boardgame by TSR in 1978, and is now published by Steve Jackson Games.
- The Awful Green Things from Outer Space: Originally published in Dragon #28 (August 1979). A game of green aliens invading a spaceship. This too was eventually published as a separate game by TSR and later published by Steve Jackson Games as well.
- Search for the Emperor's Treasure: Originally published in Dragon #51 (July 1981). Players take the roles of adventurers searching a fantasy empire for the emperor's scattered magical treasures. A revised edition was included in a box set called "The Best of Dragon Games", 1990.
- File 13: Originally published in Dragon #72 (April 1983). A game about designing board games. A second edition was reissued in "The Best of Dragon Games".
- King of the Tabletop: Originally published in Dragon #77 (September 1983), this is a game in which people create their own kingdom from little cardboard chits representing land, characters, and events. Also expanded and published commercially as Kings and Things by West End Games, Games Workshop, and later, in a German edition, Pegasus Spiele.
- Elefant Hunt: Originally published in Dragon #88 (August 1984). Great White Hunters travel through deepest, darkest "Aferca" with the help of natives to capture as many live animals and much ivory as they can to sell for profit.

=== After TSR ===
After TSR, Wham collaborated on books with Rose Estes, and did his own novelette in Christopher Stasheff's The Exotic Enchanter. More games followed, including Kings & Things (with Rob Kuntz), the SimCity card game, and Iron Dragon. Later efforts include a reprint of Snits and Awful Green Things from Outer Space from Steve Jackson Games, and Planet Busters by Troll Lord Games.

Wham designed the board game "King of the Tabletop" with Robert J. Kuntz, which was published in Dragon #77 (September 1983); the game was expanded and published separately as the Origins award-winner Kings & Things (1986) by West End Games.

Since leaving TSR, Wham has designed many more games, including collaborating with James M. Ward on the board game Dragon Lairds, published in April 2008, and Feudality published by Z-man Games Inc. in 2011.
