= Wall of Serpents =

Fantasy book by L. Sprague de Camp and Fletcher Pratt

- First edition of Wall of Serpents
- Author: L. Sprague de Camp and Fletcher Pratt
- Cover artist: Ed Emshwiller
- Language: English
- Series: Harold Shea
- Genre: Fantasy
- Publisher: Avalon Books
- Publication date: 1960
- Publication place: United States
- Media type: Print (hardback)
- Pages: 223
- Preceded by: The Castle of Iron
- Followed by: The Enchanter Reborn

Wall of Serpents is a collection of two fantasy short stories by American science fiction and fantasy authors L. Sprague de Camp and Fletcher Pratt, the third volume in their Harold Shea series. The pieces were originally published in the magazines Fantasy Fiction and Beyond Fantasy Fiction in the issues for June 1953 and October 1954. The collection was first published in hardcover by Avalon Books in 1960, with a new edition from Phantasia Press in 1978. The first paperback edition was published by Dell Books in 1979. A 1980 edition published by Sphere Books was retitled The Enchanter Compleated. An E-book edition was published by Gollancz's SF Gateway imprint on September 29, 2011 as part of a general release of de Camp's works in electronic form.

The book has also been combined with the earlier books in the series in the omnibus edition The Complete Compleat Enchanter (1989), and with the earlier books and later stories in the omnibus edition The Mathematics of Magic: The Enchanter Stories of L. Sprague de Camp and Fletcher Pratt (2007). It has also been published in Italian and German.

The Harold Shea stories are parallel world tales in which universes where magic works coexist with our own, and in which those based on the mythologies, legends, and literary fantasies of our world and can be reached by aligning one's mind to them by a system of symbolic logic. In the stories collected as Wall of Serpents, the authors' protagonist Harold Shea visits two such worlds, those of Finnish and Irish mythology.

== Contents ==
- "The Wall of Serpents"
- "The Green Magician"

== Reception ==
Floyd C. Gale of Galaxy Science Fiction rated Wall of Serpents 4.5 stars out of five, stating that "de Camp and Pratt were far and away the finest team of fantasy collaborators ... their stories are always chuckle-filled delights".

== Sources ==
- Laughlin, Charlotte; Daniel J. H. Levack (1983). De Camp: An L. Sprague de Camp Bibliography. San Francisco: Underwood/Miller. pp. 103–104.

Preceded by The Castle of Iron	Harold Shea Series; Wall of Serpents	Succeeded by The Enchanter Reborn
