= The Incomplete Enchanter =

1941 collection of novellas by L. Sprague de Camp and Fletcher Pratt

- Dust-jacket illustration for The Incomplete Enchanter
- Authors: L. Sprague de Camp; Fletcher Pratt
- Cover artist: Boris Artzybasheff
- Language: English
- Series: Harold Shea Series
- Genre: Fantasy
- Publisher: Henry Holt and Company
- Publication date: 1941
- Publication place: United States
- Media type: Print (hardback)
- Pages: 326
- Followed by: The Castle of Iron

The Incomplete Enchanter is a collection of two fantasy novellas by American writers L. Sprague de Camp and Fletcher Pratt, the first volume in their Harold Shea series. The pieces were originally published in the magazine Unknown in the issues for May and August 1940. The collection was first published in hardcover by Henry Holt and Company in 1941 and in paperback by Pyramid Books in 1960.

== Summary ==
The Harold Shea stories are parallel world tales in which magic exists in separate universes that coexist with our own, and which can be reached by aligning one's mind to them by a system of symbolic logic. The worlds are based on the mythologies, legends, and literary fantasies of our world. In the stories collected as The Incomplete Enchanter, the authors' protagonist Harold Shea visits two such worlds, that of Norse mythology and that of Edmund Spenser's The Faerie Queene.

== Contents ==
- "The Roaring Trumpet"
- "The Mathematics of Magic"

== Reception ==
Reviewing the 1950 edition, Boucher and McComas described the series as "a high point in the application of sternest intellectual logic to screwball fantasy." Damon Knight characterized the series as "relaced, ribald adventure ... priceless," saying that "no fantasy reader should be without them." P. Schuyler Miller declared that these "first and best of the Harold Shea stories," through the authors' "fiendishly clever application of symbolic logic", have "annexed the entire realm of "pure" fantasy to science fiction." Alfred Bester wrote in 1960 that the hero's adventures "lean heavily on anachronistic dialogue for laughs, but the book holds up amazingly well after twenty years".

In 1977, Richard A. Lupoff described the series as "whole planes above the hackneyed gut-spillers and skull-smashers that pass for heroic fantasy."

The book was also reviewed by E. J. Carnell in Operation Fantast, #6, September 1950; the editor in Thrilling Wonder Stories, October 1950; P. Schuyler Miller in Other Worlds Science Stories, January 1951; Joseph H. Crawford, Jr., James J. Donahue and Donald M. Grant in '333': A Bibliography of the Science-Fantasy Novel, 1953; John Carnell in Science Fantasy, August 1962; Joseph Nicholas in Paperback Parlour, December 1979; Everett F. Bleiler in The Guide to Supernatural Fiction, 1983; and Bill Fawcett and Jody Lynn Nye in Galaxy's Edge Magazine, Issue 19, March 2016.

== Editions ==
The Incomplete Enchanter has been reprinted by a number of other publishers since its first appearance. A 1979 edition published by Sphere Books was issued under the variant title The Incompleat Enchanter. An E-book edition was published by Gollancz's SF Gateway imprint on September 29, 2011 as part of a general release of de Camp's works in electronic form.

The collection has been combined with later books in the series in the omnibus editions The Compleat Enchanter (1975) (which presumably influenced the title of the Sphere edition just mentioned), The Complete Compleat Enchanter (1989), and The Mathematics of Magic: The Enchanter Stories of L. Sprague de Camp and Fletcher Pratt (2007). It has also been published in German, Italian, and Dutch.

| Preceded by none | Harold Shea Series; The Incomplete Enchanter | Succeeded by The Castle of Iron |
