= Frieda A. Murray =

American fantasy writer (born 1948)

- Born: Frieda Adelle Murray; September 17, 1948 (age 76); Waco, Texas, U.S.
- Occupation: Author
- Genre: Fantasy
- Spouse: Roland J. Green (m. 1975)
- Children: 1

Frieda Adelle Murray (born September 17, 1948) is an American fantasy writer whose works are generally written in collaboration with Roland J. Green.

== Life ==
Murray was born September 17, 1948, in Waco, Texas, the daughter of Samuel Stevenson Murray and Frieda (Rhone) Murray. She moved to Chicago from Washington, D.C., in 1966. She married Roland J. Green in 1975. They have one daughter, Violette Y. Green (born 1984).

== Bibliography ==
=== Novels ===
- The Book of Kantela (1985) with Roland J. Green

=== Short stories ===
- "A Devil Unknown" (1994) with Roland J. Green
- "A Song Will Rise" (1995) with Roland J. Green
- "Sir William, He Lay Snug" (1995) with Roland J. Green
- "She Who Might Be Obeyed" (1995) with Roland J. Green
- "Enchanter Kiev" (1995) with Roland J. Green
- "Chozzerai" (1996) with Roland J. Green
- "To Speak with Men and Angels" (1996) with Roland J. Green
- "The Winds They Did Blow High" (2001)
