= Belphoebe =

Fictional character in The Faerie Queene

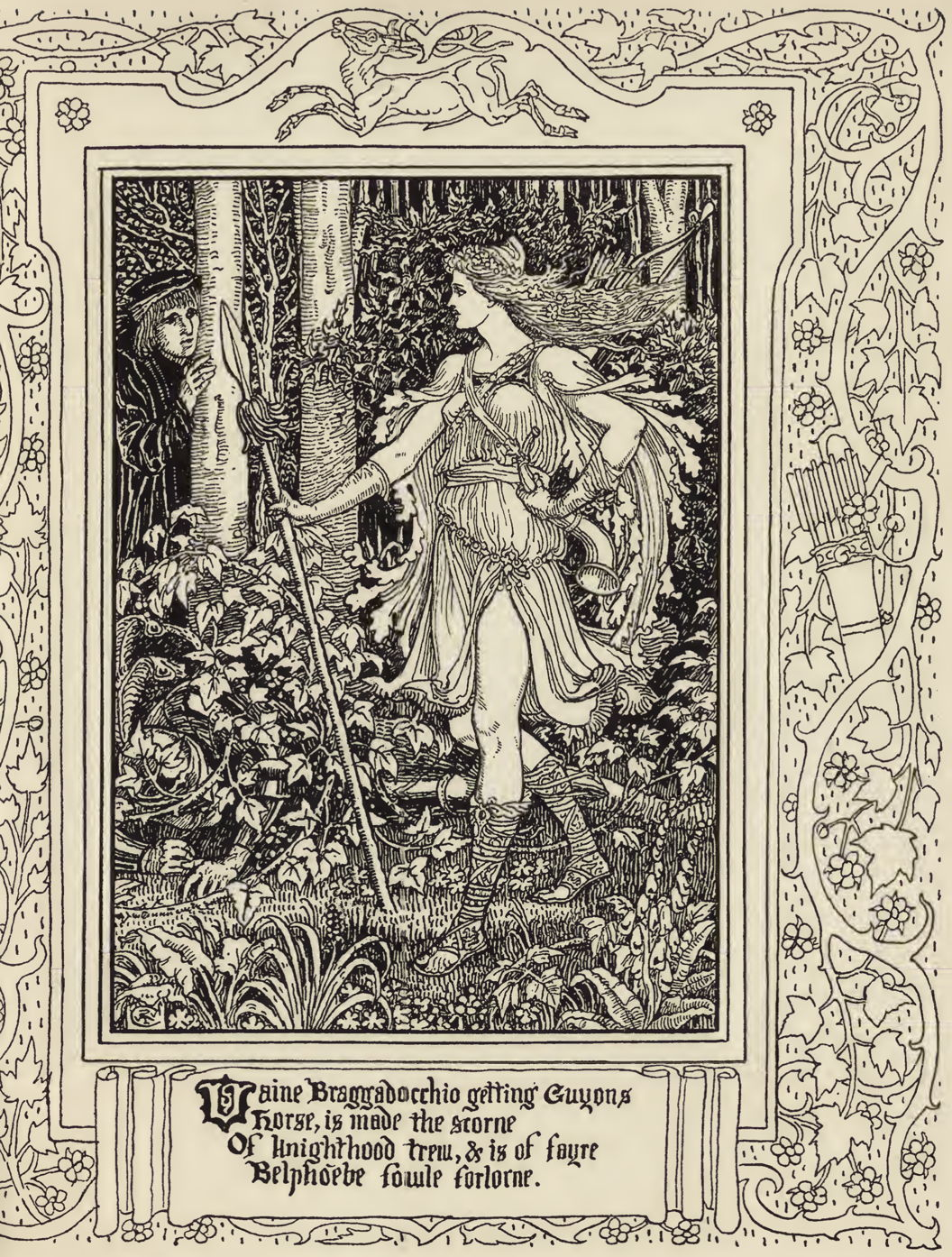
A drawing of Belphoebe by Walter Crane

Belphoebe (or Belphebe, Belphœbe) is a character in Edmund Spenser's poem The Faerie Queene (1590), a representation of Queen Elizabeth I (conceived of, however, as a pure, high-spirited maiden, rather than a queen). Spenser intended her name to mean "beautiful Diana" (Phoebe being an epithet of the Greek moon goddess Artemis, who was known to the Romans as Diana), and it is suggested that she is a member of Poseidon's family. A virgin huntress, Belphoebe can certainly fight, as a potential rapist found out. She is the stronger, militant sister of Amoret.

Belphoebe is mentioned in Kipling's poem "The Queen's Men", which is based on Spenser's work and which constitutes a lament for two young sea-captains who perished on a mission to which she sent them:

[They] passed into eclipse,
Her kiss upon their lips —
Even Belphoebe's, whom they gave their lives for!

Belphoebe is also mentioned in Sir Walter Raleigh's poem "If Cynthia be a Queen".
