= Christopher Stasheff =

American science fiction and fantasy author (1944–2018)

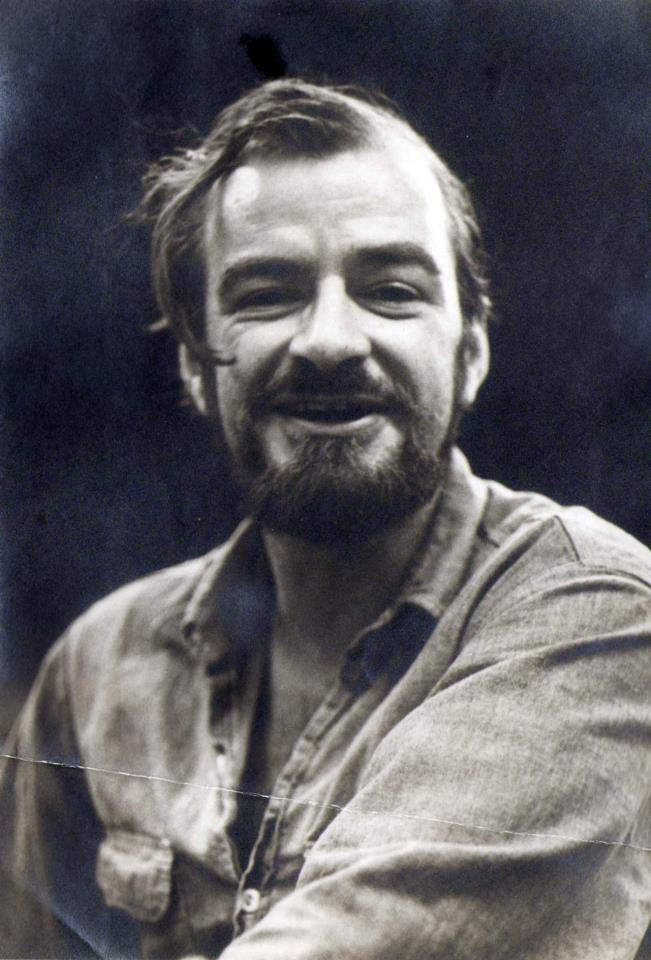
- Christopher Stasheff in 1969
- Born: Christopher Boris Stasheff; January 15, 1944; Mount Vernon, New York, US
- Died: June 10, 2018 (aged 74); Champaign, Illinois, US
- Occupations: Professor; novelist; short story author
- Writing career
- Genres: Science fiction, science fantasy, fantasy
- Notable works: The Warlock in Spite of Himself, Her Majesty's Wizard, A Wizard in Bedlam

Christopher Stasheff (15 January 1944 – 10 June 2018) was an American science fiction and fantasy author whose novels include The Warlock in Spite of Himself (1969) and Her Majesty's Wizard (1986).

== Education ==
He received a bachelor's degree and a Master of Arts in radio-TV at the University of Michigan and a PhD in theater from the University of Nebraska.

== Career ==
From 1972 to 1987, he taught at Montclair State College, then moved to Champaign, Illinois, and became a full-time writer. In 2000, he resumed teaching radio and television, at Eastern New Mexico University in Portales, New Mexico. He retired in 2009 and moved back to Champaign. Chris died on June 10, 2018, from Parkinson's disease. Stasheff has been noted for his blending of science fiction and fantasy, as seen in his Warlock series, which placed an "'epic fantasy' in a science-fictional frame".

== Books ==
=== The DDT future continuity ===
- Saint Vidicon to the Rescue (2005)
- Escape Velocity (1983)
- Mind Out of Time (2003) (Short story collection)

==== Starship Troupers ====
- A Company of Stars (1991)
- We Open on Venus (1993)
- A Slight Detour (1994)
- The Unknown Guest (2012) (self published)

==== Warlock of Gramayre ====
- The Warlock in Spite of Himself (1969)
- King Kobold (1971, revised as King Kobold Revived (1984))
- The Warlock Unlocked (1982)
- The Warlock Enraged (1985)
- The Warlock Wandering (1986)
- The Warlock Is Missing (1986)
- The Warlock Heretical (1987)
- The Warlock's Companion (1988)
- The Warlock Insane (1989)
- The Warlock Rock (1990)
- Warlock and Son (1991)
- The Warlock's Last Ride (2004)

Ominbus editions:

- To the Magic Born (1986): Escape Velocity, The Warlock in Spite of Himself
- Odd Warlock Out (1989): The Warlock Heretical, The Warlock's Companion, The Warlock Insane
- Warlock: To the Magic Born (1990): Escape Velocity, The Warlock in Spite of Himself, King Kobold Revived
- The Warlock Enlarged (1991):King Kobold Revived, The Warlock Unlocked, The Warlock Enraged
- The Warlock's Night Out (1991): The Warlock Wandering, The Warlock is Missing

==== Rogue Wizard ====
- A Wizard in Bedlam (1979)
- A Wizard in Absentia (1993)
- A Wizard in Mind (1995)
- A Wizard in War (1995)
- A Wizard in Peace (1996)
- A Wizard in Chaos (1997)
- A Wizard in Midgard [pre-publication title A Wizard in Elfland] (1998)
- A Wizard and a Warlord (2000)
- A Wizard in the Way (2000)
- A Wizard in a Feud (2001)

==== The Warlock's Heirs ====
- M'lady Witch (1994)
- Quicksilver's Knight (1995)
- The Spell-bound Scholar (1999)
- Here Be Monsters (2001)

=== A Wizard in Rhyme ===
- Her Majesty's Wizard (1986)
- The Oathbound Wizard (1993)
- The Witch Doctor (1994)
- The Secular Wizard (1995)
- My Son, the Wizard (1997)
- The Haunted Wizard (1999)
- The Crusading Wizard (2000)
- The Feline Wizard (2000)

=== Star Stone ===
- The Shaman (1995)
- The Sage (1996)

=== Crafters ===
- The Crafters (1991) (with Bill Fawcett)
- Blessings and Curses (1992)

=== Harold Shea (with L. Sprague de Camp) ===
- The Enchanter Reborn (1992)
- The Exotic Enchanter (1995)

=== Mage Knight ===
- Stolen Prophecy (2003)

=== Other novels ===
- War and Honor (with Gordon R. Dickson, David Drake and Chelsea Quinn Yarbro)
- Wing Commander: End Run (with William R. Forstchen) (1994)

=== Standalone collections ===
- The Gods of War (1992)
- Dragon's Eye (1994)
- The Day the Magic Stopped (with Bill Fawcett) (1995)

=== Anthologies ===
- Blood and War (1993)
