= Fletcher Pratt =

American military historian and fantasy writer

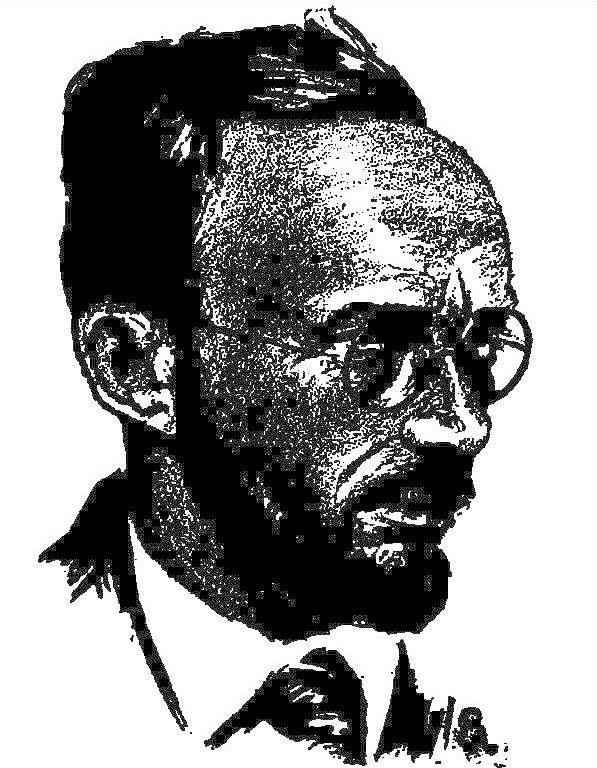
- Fletcher Pratt, as pictured in the June 1929 issue of Science Wonder Stories
- Born: April 25, 1897; Buffalo, New York
- Died: June 10, 1956 (aged 59); Long Branch, New Jersey, US
- Occupations: Novelist, historian
- Writing career
- Pen name: Irvin Lester, George U. Fletcher
- Genres: Science fiction, fantasy, history
- Notable work: Ordeal by Fire

Murray Fletcher Pratt (25 April 1897 – 10 June 1956) was an American writer of history, science fiction, and fantasy. He is best known for his works on naval history and the American Civil War and for fiction written with L. Sprague de Camp.

== Life and work ==
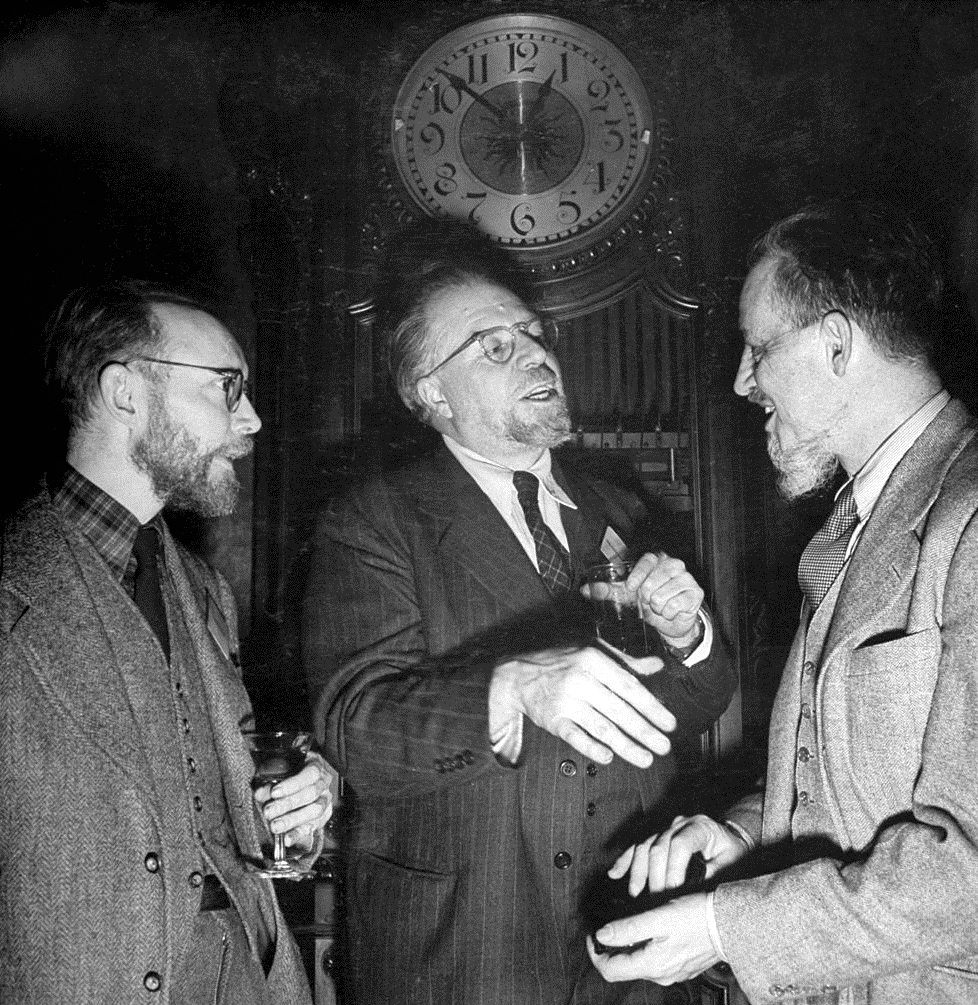
Fletcher Pratt (left) with fellow Baker Street Irregulars Christopher Morley and Rex Stout (1944)

According to de Camp, Pratt was born near Tonawanda, New York. The son of Robert M. and Alice Horton Pratt, he attended public schools in Buffalo and graduated from high school in 1915 at the Griffith Institute in Springville, New York, where his father operated a trucking delivery service between Springville and Buffalo.

Following high school he attended Hobart College in Geneva, New York, for one year. In February 1916 the Associated Press reported that he had been arrested for burglary in Geneva after a series of midnight cash drawer robberies that allegedly netted him less than $25. He was reported to have told police that his father did not supply him with enough funds to survive at Hobart. On February 23 the Buffalo Enquirer reported: "Pratt's father came on from Springville yesterday and it was practically decided to send the youth to the State Hospital for the Insane at Willard, pending an investigation of his case by the grand jury. It is thought that he may be mentally unsound."

In May 1918 the Washington Star reported that the staff at the camp library at the Army's Camp Meade in Maryland had been strengthened by the addition of "Murray F. Pratt, who recently came here from the Buffalo, N.Y., Public Library".

After a stint at the Buffalo Courier-Express he settled in New York City in 1920 and worked for a Staten Island newspaper before turning to freelance writing in 1923. In 1926, he married Inga Stephens, an artist. According to de Camp she was his second wife. In the late 1920s he began selling stories to pulp magazines, primarily the science fiction magazines published by Hugo Gernsback. Many of these stories were either written with a collaborator or were translations from French and German sources.

When a fire gutted his apartment in the early 1930s, according to de Camp's memoir, he used the insurance money to study at the Sorbonne for a year. After his return from France he was a staff writer for American Detective, a true crime magazine, and began writing histories. His short history of the Civil War, Ordeal by Fire, was published to critical acclaim in 1935 and became a bestseller.

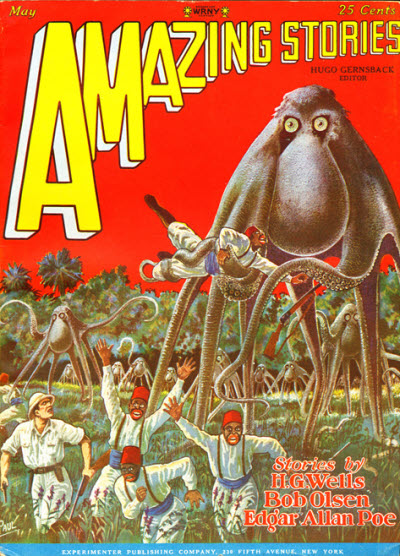
Pratt's novelette "The Octopus Cycle" was the cover story in the May 1928 Amazing Stories

Starting in the summer of 1937 Pratt became a regular at the annual Bread Loaf Writers' Conference in Vermont for the next 18 years, eventually becoming their Dean of Nonfiction.

During World War II Pratt was a military analyst for the New York Post and for Time magazine (whose obituary described him as "bearded, gnome-like" and listed "raising marmosets" among his hobbies), and later was a regular reviewer of historical nonfiction and fantasy and science fiction for the New York Times Book Review.

Following World War II the Pratts came into possession of a rambling 31-room Victorian mansion on a high bluff overlooking the Atlantic Ocean at Atlantic Highlands, New Jersey, purchased by Inga Stephens Pratt's wealthy mother for use as a summer place. Whimsically dubbed The Ipsy-Wipsy Institute, the house became a watering hole for Fletcher's literary friends at an unending succession of marathon weekend house parties. A number of writers moved into the mansion's many bedrooms and spent entire summers there. Frequent guests and residents at Ipsy-Wipsy included William Lindsay Gresham, John Ciardi, William Sloane, Basil Davenport, Lester del Rey, Ted Sturgeon, Esther Carlson, Fred Pohl, John D. Clark, Willy Ley, Judith Merrill, Eugenie Clark, L. Sprague de Camp, and many others. Laurence Manning, Pratt's old writing partner from the 1930s, purchased part of the property and moved in next door. The Pratts simultaneously maintained a large apartment in Midtown Manhattan near Central Park, where they hosted meetings of the Hydra Club.

Pratt was the inventor of a set of rules for naval wargaming, which he created before the Second World War. This was known as the "Fletcher Pratt Naval War Game" and it involved dozens of tiny wooden ships, built on a scale of one inch to 50 feet. These were spread over the floor of Pratt's apartment and their strengths were calculated via a complex mathematical formula. Noted author and artist Jack Coggins was a frequent participant in Pratt's Navy Game, and de Camp met him through his wargaming group.

Pratt established the literary dining club known as the Trap Door Spiders in 1944. The name is a reference to the reclusive habits of the trapdoor spider, which when it enters its burrow pulls the hatch shut behind it. The club was later fictionalized as the Black Widowers in a series of mystery stories by Isaac Asimov. Pratt himself was fictionalized in one story, "To the Barest", as the Widowers’ founder, Ralph Ottur.

He was also a charter member of The Civil War Round Table of New York, organized in 1951, and served as its president from 1953 to 1954. In 1956, after his death, the Round Table's board of directors established the Fletcher Pratt Award in his honor, which is presented every May to the author or editor of the best non-fiction book on the Civil War published during the preceding calendar year.

Aside from his historical writings, Pratt is best known for his fantasy collaborations with de Camp, the most famous of which is the humorous Harold Shea series, eventually published in full as The Complete Compleat Enchanter (1989, ISBN 0-671-69809-5). His solo fantasy novels The Well of the Unicorn and The Blue Star are also highly regarded. Pratt's story "Dr. Grimshaw's Sanitarium" was adapted for radio drama by George Lefferts, and broadcast twice: first on Dimension X (September 22, 1950) and then on X Minus One (July 14, 1955).

Pratt wrote in a markedly identifiable prose style, reminiscent of the style of Bernard DeVoto. One of his books is dedicated "To Benny DeVoto, who taught me to write."

Several of Pratt's books were illustrated by Inga Stephens Pratt, his wife.

=== Legacy ===
David Kahn, author of the groundbreaking 1967 book The Codebreakers, gave full credit for his start on the subject to Pratt's Secret and Urgent (1939) that Kahn had found in the Great Neck, NY public library as a pre-teen in the 1940s."'It hooked me — and I never grew up,' he told The Washington Post in 1978."

== Bibliography ==
=== Novels ===
- Land of Unreason (1941) with L. Sprague de Camp
- The Carnelian Cube (1948) with L. Sprague de Camp
- The Well of the Unicorn (1948)
- The Blue Star (1952)
- Double Jeopardy (1952)
- The Undying Fire (1953)
- Invaders from Rigel (1960)
- Alien Planet (1962)

==== Novellas (short novels) ====
- "Asylum Satellite" (1951)
- "The Wanderer's Return" (1951)

=== Series ===
==== Harold Shea ====
- The Mathematics of Magic: The Enchanter Stories of L. Sprague de Camp and Fletcher Pratt (2007) with L. Sprague de Camp
- The Complete Compleat Enchanter (1989) with L. Sprague de Camp
  - The Incomplete Enchanter (1940) with L. Sprague de Camp
  - The Castle of Iron (1941) with L. Sprague de Camp
  - The Compleat Enchanter (1975) with L. Sprague de Camp
  - Wall of Serpents [vt The Enchanter Completed (1980 UK)] (1960) with L. Sprague de Camp

=== Collections ===
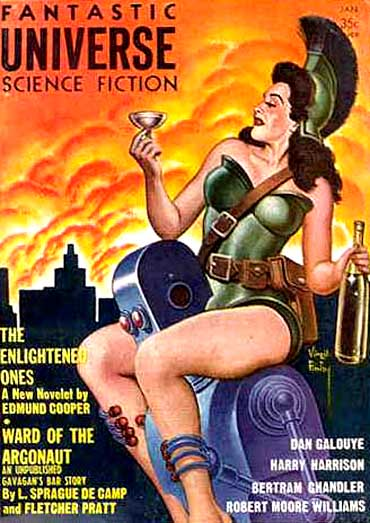
A Pratt-de Camp "Gavagan's Bar" story was cover-featured on the January 1959 issue of Fantastic Universe

- Double in Space (1951)
- Double Jeopardy (1952)
- Tales from Gavagan's Bar (1953, expanded 1978) with L. Sprague de Camp

=== Anthologies ===
- World of Wonder (1951)

==== Twayne Triplets (edited) ====
- The Petrified Planet (1952)
- Witches Three (1952)

=== Nonfiction ===
- Fletcher Pratt's Naval War Game (1940). A book on the Fletcher Pratt Naval Wargame was printed in 2011. See link
- A Man and His Meals (1947)
- World of Wonder : an Introduction to Imaginative Literature (1951)

==== Science ====
- Rockets, Jets, Guided Missiles and Spaceships (1951) with Jack Coggins
- By Space Ship to the Moon (1952) with Jack Coggins
- All About Famous Inventors and Their Inventions (1955) illustrated by Rus Anderson
- All About Rockets and Jets (1955) illustrated by Jack Coggins
- Rockets, Satellites and Space Travel (1958) with Jack Coggins

==== History and biography ====
===== Naval history =====
- The Navy, a History; the Story of a Service in Action (1938)
- Sea Power and Today's War (1939) OCLC 1450484
- Fighting Ships of the U.S. Navy (1941) illustrated by Jack Coggins
- Ships, Men - and Bases (1941) with Frank Knox
- A Short History of the Army and Navy (1944)
- The Navy has Wings; the United States Naval Aviation (1943)
- The Navy's War (1944)
- Empire and the Sea (1946) with Inga Stephens
- Fleet Against Japan (1946)
- Night Work: the Story of Task force 39 (1946) OCLC 1492544
- Preble's Boys; Commodore Preble and the Birth of American Sea Power (1950) LCCN 50-10765
- The Compact History of the United States Navy (1957) OCLC 367782

===== The Napoleonic Wars =====
- Road to Empire; the Life and Times of Bonaparte, the General (1939)
- The Empire and the Glory; Napoleon Bonaparte: 1800-1806 (1948)

===== War of 1812 =====
- The Heroic Years; Fourteen Years of the Republic, 1801-1815 (1934)

===== The Civil War =====
- Ordeal by Fire; an Informal History of the Civil War (1935)
- The Monitor and the Merrimac (1951)
- The Military Genius of Abraham Lincoln : an Essay (1951) by Colin R. Ballard; introduction by Pratt
- Stanton, Lincoln's Secretary of War (1953)
- The Civil War (1955)
- Civil War in Pictures (1955)
- Civil War on Western Waters (1956)

===== World War II =====
- America and Total War (1941)
- The U.S. Army : a Guide to its Men and Equipment (1942) with David Pattee
- What the Citizen Should Know about Modern War (1942)
- The Marines' War, an Account of the Struggle for the Pacific from Both American and Japanese Sources (1948)
- War for the World; a Chronicle of Our Fighting Forces in World War II (1950)

===== Other =====
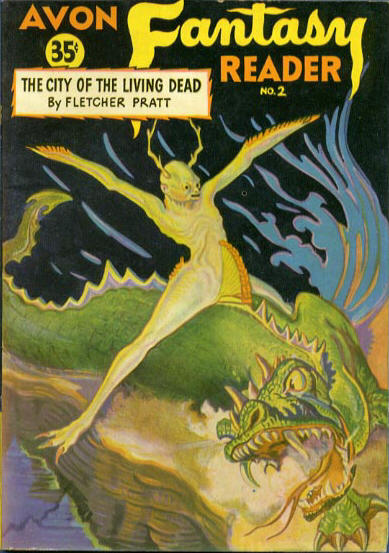
"The City of the Living Dead" was republished in a 1947 issue of Avon Fantasy Reader

- The Cunning Mulatto and Other Cases of Ellis Parker, American Detective (1935) with Ellis H. Parker
- Hail, Caesar! (1936)
- The Lost Battalion (1938) with Thomas M. Johnson
- Muscle-power Artillery (1938)
- "The City of the Living Dead" (1939) with Laurence Manning.
- Secret and Urgent; the Story of Codes and Ciphers (1939) OCLC 795019
- My Life to the Destroyers (1944) with L. A. Abercrombie
- Eleven Generals; Studies in American Command (1949)
- The Third King (1950)
- The Battles that Changed History (1956) ISBN 0-486-41129-X

== Wargame rules ==
The rules of Pratt's wargame, official variants, and a number of stories about participants and events in his wargame club have been published in Fletcher Pratt's Naval Wargame: Wargaming with model ships 1900 - 1945 by John Curry, ISBN 978-1-4475-1855-6, published by Naval Wargaming Books.
