= Tales of the Black Widowers =

1974 collection of mystery short stories by Isaac Asimov

The Tales of the Black Widowers
- First edition
- Author: Isaac Asimov
- Cover artist: Wendell Minor
- Language: English
- Series: Black Widowers
- Genre: Mystery
- Publisher: Doubleday
- Publication date: 1974
- Publication place: United States & United Kingdom
- Media type: Print (hardcover)
- Pages: 198 pp
- ISBN: 9780385083034
- OCLC: 2620758
- Followed by: More Tales of the Black Widowers

Tales of the Black Widowers is a collection of mystery short stories by American author Isaac Asimov, featuring his fictional club of mystery solvers, the Black Widowers. It was first published in hardcover by Doubleday in June 1974, and in paperback by the Fawcett Crest imprint of Ballantine Books in August 1976. The first British edition was issued by Panther in 1976. The book has also been translated into German and French.

This book is the first of six that describe mysteries solved by the Black Widowers, based on a literary dining club he belonged to known as the Trap Door Spiders. It collects twelve stories by Asimov, nine reprinted from mystery magazines and three previously unpublished, together with a general introduction, and an afterword following each story by the author. Each story involves the club members' knowledge of trivia.

== Contents ==
- "The Acquisitive Chuckle"
- "Ph as in Phony"
- "Truth to Tell"
- "Go, Little Book!"
- "Early Sunday Morning"
- "The Obvious Factor"
- "The Pointing Finger"
- "Miss What?"
- "The Lullaby of Broadway"
- "Yankee Doodle Went to Town"
- "The Curious Omission"
- "Out of Sight"
