= The Blade of Conan =

Book by Lyon Sprague de Camp

- The Blade of Conan edited by L. Sprague de Camp, Ace Books, 1979
- Author: L. Sprague de Camp (editor)
- Cover artist: Sanjulián
- Language: English
- Genre: Essays
- Publisher: Ace Books
- Publication date: 1979
- Publication place: United States
- Media type: Print (Paperback)
- Pages: ix, 310 pp
- ISBN: 0-441-11670-1
- OCLC: 5053059
- LC Class: CPB Box no. 1796 vol. 16

The Blade of Conan is a 1979 collection of essays edited by L. Sprague de Camp, published in paperback by Ace Books. The material was originally published as articles in George H. Scithers' fanzine Amra. The book is a companion to Ace's later volume of material from Amra, The Spell of Conan (1980). Most of the material in the two volumes, together with some additional material, was reprinted from three previous books issued in hardcover by Mirage Press; de Camp's collection The Conan Reader (1968), and the de Camp and Scithers-edited anthologies The Conan Swordbook (1969). and The Conan Grimoire (1972).

== Summary ==
The book consists of thirty-one pieces, mostly essays on fantasy writer Robert E. Howard and his seminal sword and sorcery hero Conan the Barbarian, Howard's sources and literary successors, and other fantasy authors such as E. R. Eddison, A. Merritt and Talbot Mundy.

== Contents ==
- “Swords and Sorcery” (Richard H. Eney)
- “An Informal Biography of Conan the Cimmerian” (John D. Clark, P. Schuyler Miller, and L. Sprague de Camp)
- “Ocean Trade in the Hyborian Age” (John Boardman)
- “Hyborian Technology” (L. Sprague de Camp)
- “The Real Hyborian Age” (Lin Carter)
- “Lord of the Black Throne” (P. Schuyler Miller)
- “The Art of Robert Ervin Howard” (Poul Anderson)
- “Memories of R.E.H.” (L. Sprague de Camp)
- “Conan on Crusade” (Allan Howard)
- “A Gent from Cross Plains” (Glenn Lord)
- “Editing Conan” (L. Sprague de Camp)
- “Howard’s Detective Stories” (Glenn Lord)
- “Howard and the Races” (L. Sprague de Camp)
- “The Case for Solomon Kane” (John Pocsik)
- “Stirrups and Scholarship” (L. Sprague de Camp)
- “Howard’s Cthuloid Tales” (Ben Solon)
- “Controlled Anachronism” (Fritz Leiber)
- “The Novels of Eric Rücker Eddison” (John Boardman)
- “Hyborians, Be Seated [(The Fantasy of A. Merritt)]” (Ray Capella)
- “Mundy’s Vendhya” (L. Sprague de Camp)
- “Titivated Romance” (Fritz Leiber)
- “Weapons of Choice I” (W. H. Griffey)
- “Weapons of Choice II” (Albert E. Gechter)
- “On Weapons of Choice and/or Necessity” (Jerry E. Pournelle)
- “Son of Weapons of Choice and/or Necessity” (Jerry E. Pournelle)
- “Range” (L. Sprague de Camp)
- “Sublimated Bloodthirstiness” (Poul Anderson)
- “And as for the Admixture of Cultures on Imaginary Worlds” (Leigh Brackett)
- “Ranging Afterthoughts” (L. Sprague de Camp)
- “Arming the Incomplete Enchanter” (Jerry E. Pournelle)
- “The Complete Duelist” (L. Sprague de Camp)
- “Rearming the Incomplete Enchanter” (Jerry E. Pournelle)
