= The Conan Swordbook =

Book by Lyon Sprague de Camp

- The Conan Swordbook edited by L. Sprague de Camp and George H. Scithers, Mirage Press, 1969
- Author: edited by L. Sprague de Camp and George H. Scithers
- Cover artist: George Barr
- Language: English
- Genre: Sword and sorcery Essays
- Publisher: Mirage Press
- Publication date: 1969
- Publication place: United States
- Media type: Print (Hardback)
- Pages: xiii, 255 pp

The Conan Swordbook is a 1969 collection of essays edited by L. Sprague de Camp and George H. Scithers, published in hardcover by Mirage Press. The essays were originally published as articles in Scithers' fanzine Amra. The book is a companion to Mirage's other two volumes of material from Amra, The Conan Reader (1968) and The Conan Grimoire (1972). Most of the material in the three volumes, together with some additional material, was later reprinted in two de Camp-edited paperback anthologies from Ace Books; The Blade of Conan (1979) and The Spell of Conan (1980).

== Summary ==
The book consists of twenty-nine pieces, mostly essays on fantasy writer Robert E. Howard and his seminal sword and sorcery hero Conan the Barbarian, Howard's sources and literary successors, and other fantasy authors such as Talbot Mundy, E. R. Eddison, Edgar Rice Burroughs and A. Merritt. Some original material by Howard is also included.

== Contents ==
- “Swords and Sorcery” (Richard H. Eney)
- “Letter to Harold Preece” (Robert E. Howard)
- “Letter to August Derleth” (Robert E. Howard)
- “The Art of Robert Ervin Howard” (Poul Anderson)
- “A Gent from Cross Plains” (Glenn Lord)
- “Who Were the AEsir?” (Poul Anderson)
- “Who Was Crom?” (Albert E. Gechter)
- “Lord of the Black Throne” (P. Schuyler Miller)
- “Conan of the Khyber Rifles” (Chuck Hansen and Norman Metcalf)
- “Howard’s Detective Stories” (Glenn Lord)
- “Conan on Crusade” (Allan Howard)
- “Howard’s Cthuloid Tales” (Ben Solon)
- “Editing Conan” (L. Sprague de Camp)
- “The Novels of Eric Rücker Eddison” (John Boardman)
- “John Carter: Sword of Theosophy” (Fritz Leiber)
- “Hyborians, Be Seated [(The Fantasy of A. Merritt)]” (Ray Capella)
- “Titivated Romance” (Fritz Leiber)
- “Controlled Anachronism” (Fritz Leiber)
- “…And Strange-Sounding Names” (Marion Zimmer Bradley)
- “Weapons of Choice [I]” (W. H. Griffey)
- “Weapons of Choice [II]” (Albert E. Gechter)
- “Weapons of Choice and/or Necessity” (Jerry E. Pournelle)
- “Range” (L. Sprague de Camp)
- “Sublimated Bloodthirstiness” (Poul Anderson)
- “And as for the Admixture of Cultures on Imaginary Worlds” (Leigh Brackett)
- “Response” (E. Hoffmann Price)
- “Ranging Afterthoughts” (L. Sprague de Camp)
- “Ocean Trade in the Hyborian Age” (John Boardman)
- “An Informal Biography of Conan the Cimmerian” (John D. Clark, P. Schuyler Miller and L. Sprague de Camp)
