= Ph as in Phony =

1972 mystery short story by American writer Isaac Asimov

"Ph as in Phony" is a mystery short story by American writer Isaac Asimov. It was first published in the July 1972 issue of Ellery Queen's Mystery Magazine under the title The Phony Ph.D. The reason for this title change was that the magazine ran a series by Lawrence Treat with similar "_ is for _" titles. When it was republished in Tales of the Black Widowers in 1974, the original title was restored. It is the second published story about the Black Widowers, a gentlemen's club that solves mysteries based loosely upon the Trap Door Spiders, a stag-club of which Asimov was a member. It was reprinted in the collection The Return of the Black Widowers in 2003.

== Plot summary ==
Dr. Thomas Trumbull, as the evening's host, brings a Doctor Doctor Arnold Stacey to dinner. (Note: the rules of the club dictate that all members and guests receive the title of "doctor," so all with doctorates are known as "doctor doctor.") Upon questioning by James Drake, it is revealed that Stacey's "lesser doctorate" is in chemistry, and that he teaches at the university where Drake got his doctorate.

This prompts Drake to discuss a student in his classes, a Lance Faron, whom he believes to have cheated on his finals in a class, even though the system was airtight, the questions were all based on things students got wrong in class, and Faron's classmates watched him constantly. He received a 96 on a course known to be the most difficult in the school, and the professor backed him when he used it as a reason to apply for his Ph.D. The members of the club make several suggestions as to the method by which he cheated.

Finally, Henry, the waiter, speaks up. He asks if it were not possible that the student gave the teacher the questions – not vice versa – and that Faron had written the test based on what he had observed his fellow students struggling with. In other words, Faron wrote the examination paper himself and bribed his professor to use it.

== Characters ==
=== Black Widowers ===
- Geoffrey Avalon: Patent attorney; described as tall and patrician
- Thomas Trumbull: Code expert of an unknown level; loud and argumentative in nature
- Emmanuel Rubin: Free-lance author; talkative, self-centered, finicky (about food), and argumentative
- Mario Gonzalo: Artist; as argumentative as Trumbull, if not as loud
- James Drake: Chemist with a pulp-fiction fetish
- Henry (honorary member): Waiter; polite, restrained, and unceasingly honest in nature

=== Characters only appearing in this story ===
- Arnold Stacey: Chemist and professor at Berry University
- Lance Faron: Student at Berry University
- David St. George: Professor at Berry University

== See also ==
- Tales of the Black Widowers
