= Bernard F. Burke =

American astronomer

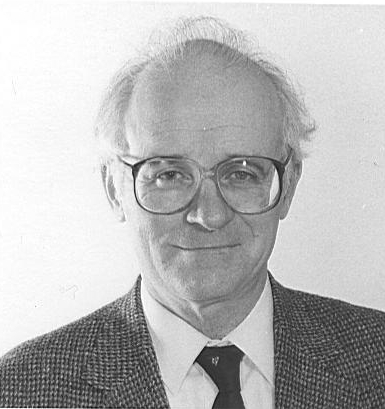
- Burke in 1993
- Born: June 7, 1928
- Died: August 5, 2018 (aged 90)
- Education: Massachusetts Institute of Technology (PhD 1953)
- Scientific career
- Thesis: Zeeman effect in rotational spectra of [omega] molecules (1953)
- Doctoral advisors: M. W. P. Strandberg

Bernard Flood Burke (June 7, 1928 – August 5, 2018) was an American astronomer. He co-discovered radio emission from Jupiter, and was part of the team that discovered the first Einstein ring in 1988.

== Early life ==
Burke was born on June 7, 1928 in Brighton, Boston. He had two sisters, Sarah (Sally) Berenson and Clare Malloy.

He went to Lexington High School. Burke studied for an undergraduate physics degree at Massachusetts Institute of Technology (MIT), graduating in 1950, before going on to study for a PhD in physics, graduating again from MIT in 1953.

== Career ==
From 1953 until 1965, he was employed to carry out radio astronomy research by Carnegie Institution of Washington, where he also headed the Radio Astronomy Section from 1962 until 1965. Burke became a faculty member of the Physics department at MIT and later was the William A. M. Burden Professor of Astrophysics, Emeritus. He was a principal investigator of the Kavli Institute for Astrophysics and Space Research at MIT.

He served on the National Science Foundation Astronomy Advisory Panel between 1958 and 1963, and the National Radio Astronomy Observatory Visiting Committee in 1958–1962. He was a Trustee for Associated Universities, Inc. between 1972 and 1990. He was also a member of Planetary Systems Working Group and the Towards Other Planetary Systems Scientific Working Group, and he was on advisory councils and committees for the National Research Council, the National Academy of Sciences, the National Science Board, the Keck Telescope, the Naval Studies Board and the Space Science Board.

He was councilor and later president of the American Astronomical Society in 1971–74 and 1986–88. He was a member of the National Science Foundation Astronomy Advisory Panel in 1958–63.

== Research ==
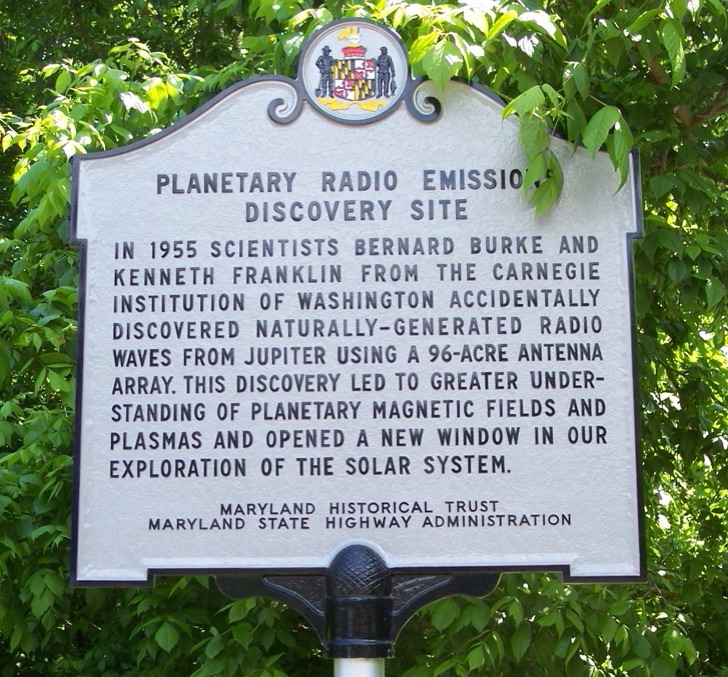
Roadside historic marker along River Road near the former Seneca Observatory that details a co-discovery of Bernard Flood Burke's.

Burke and Kenneth Franklin discovered Decametric radio emissions from Jupiter in 1955 using the Mills Cross Array, while they were trying to observe the Crab Nebula. He searched for gravitational lenses, and was one of a 6-person team that discovered the first Einstein Ring in 1988.

He also researched exoplanets, and worked on both ground- and space-based VLBI.

He co-authored Introduction to Radio Astronomy, a textbook that has had three editions, with Francis Graham-Smith.

Jansky Lecturer at the National Radio Astronomy Observatory (NRAO), 1998 He donated his papers, some linear 16.5 feet (5.0 m) in size, to the NRAO archives in July–September 2011.

== Personal life ==
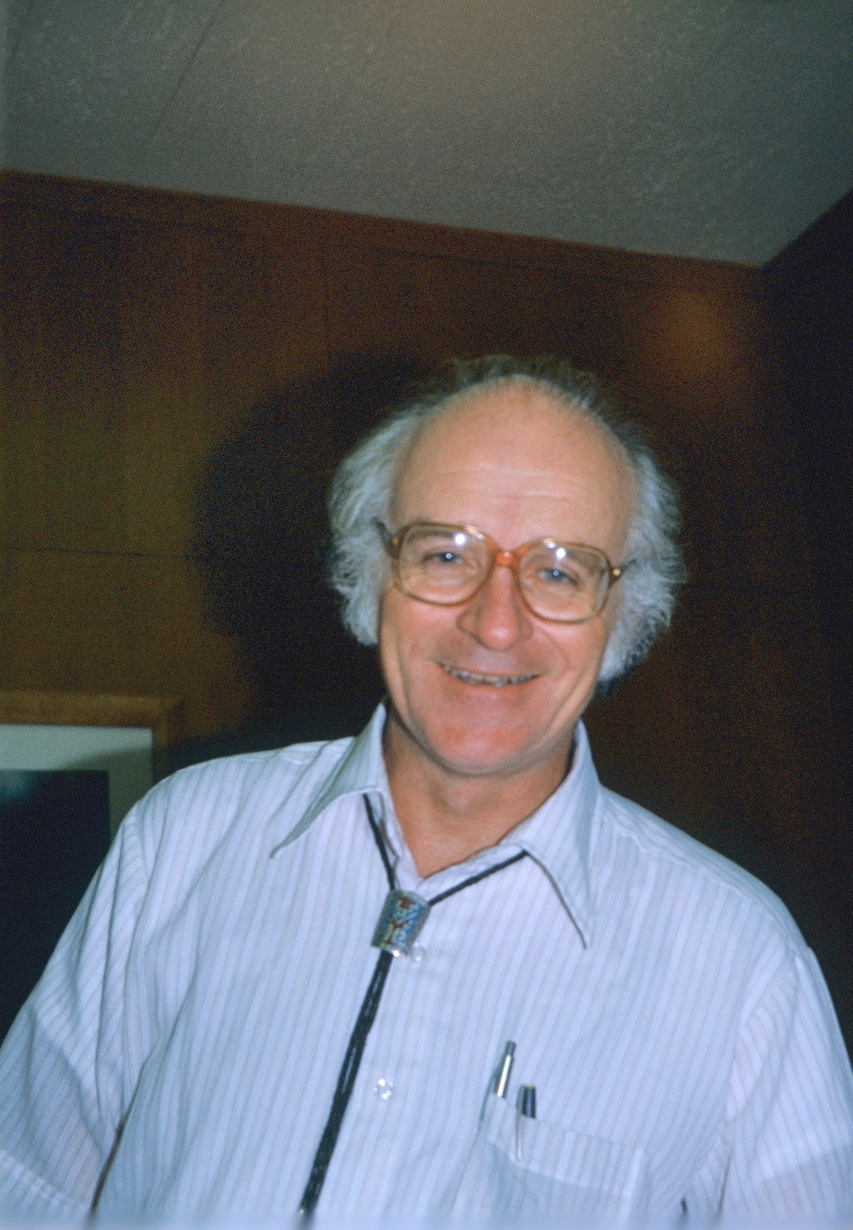
Bernie Burke, at the NASA SETI Working Group, UC Berkeley, September 1981

He spent time hiking in the White Mountains and the Rocky Mountains, and sailing from Marblehead. He also enjoyed chess.

He was married to Jane Pann Burke, and later to Elizabeth (Betsy) Platt. He had a daughter, Elizabeth Kahn, and three sons, Mark, Geoffrey, and Matthew. He had 8 grand children and 1 great-grandchild at the time of his death. He died on August 5, 2018.

== Recognition ==
In 1963, Burke received The Helen B. Warner Prize for Astronomy. He was also a member of several academic and honorary societies including American Astronomical Society, American Physical Society, International Astronomical Union, American Academy of Arts and Sciences, American Academy for the Advancement of Science, International Scientific Radio Union U.S. National Committee – Commission J. In 1970, Burke was elected to National Academy of Sciences.
