= PKS 1610−771 =

Quasar in the constellation Apus

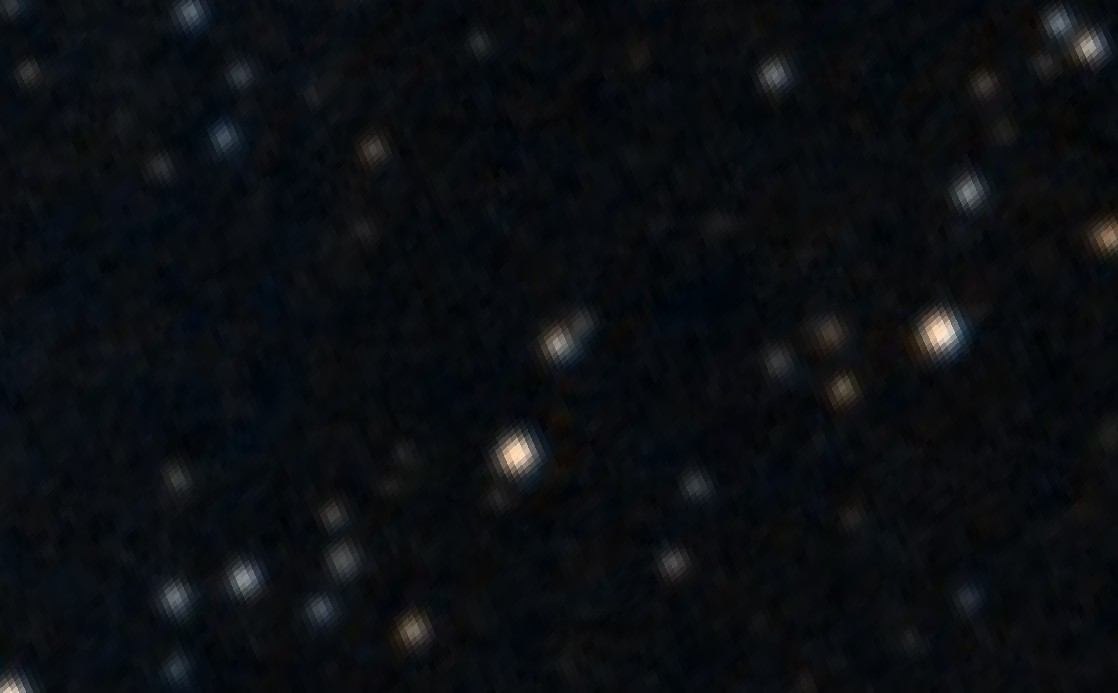
- The quasar PKS 1610−771

Observation data (J2000.0 epoch)
- Constellation: Apus
- Right ascension: 16^{h} 17^{m} 49.27^{s}
- Declination: −77° 17′ 18.46″
- Redshift: 1.710000
- Heliocentric radial velocity: 512,645 km/s
- Distance: 9.866 Gly
- Apparent magnitude (V): 19.0
- Apparent magnitude (B): 19.19

Characteristics
- Type: Opt. Var; FSRQ, blazar

Other designations
- PKS 1610−77, LQAC 244-077 001, IRCF J161749.2−771718, LEDA 2828743, WMAP 183, 4FGL J1617.9−7718, 1610−771

PKS 1610−771 is a quasar located in the southern constellation of Apus. Its redshift is (z) 1.710 and it was first discovered by the Molongo Radio Telescope in 1972. This object is known to be radio-loud and has a radio spectrum, appearing as flat, making it a flat-spectrum radio quasar.

== Description ==
PKS 1610−771 is found to be a highly reddened quasar with an estimated R-K band color index of 3.1. Its spectrum is found to have an unusual convex shape. Although it is not gravitationally lensed, the object has fuzzy elongations in the north and south directions. Evidence points out these elongations are orientated perpendicular to the object's polarization angle indicating they might be related to the quasar.

The radio structure of PKS 1610−771 is found compact. It has an elongated radio core along the position angle of 35° with a flux density of 5.4 Jy. There is also a circular halo, measuring a size of 50 milliarcseconds. When shown on radio imaging during the Very Long Baseline Interferometry Observatory Programme at 8.4 GHz, the source is found resolved into two compact components with their separations showing proper motions of 0.19 ± 0.07 milliarcseconds per year. In the north to west direction, there is a jet extending 5 milliarcseconds from the core, containing bright jet knots. Diffused radio emission can also be seen north of the source.

PKS 1610−771 is shown to display signs of interstellar scintillation at low radio frequencies on a timescale of 400 days. A rapid change of flux density was also noted in the quasar, during the four day observation with its peak-to-peak amplitude of 40% and intensity parameter of 0.44 Jy.

PKS 1610−771 has high degree of optical linear polarization. When observed by Australia Telescope Compact Array (ATCA), it is found to have several polarized components inside the inner jet regions with the strongest component having a rotation measure of +107.1 ± 0.2 rad m^{−2}. Its polarized flux density is described having monthly changes.

H I absorption has also been detected towards the quasar's spectrum at a redshift of (z) 0.45.
