= Another Round at the Spaceport Bar =

1989 anthology edited by George H. Scithers and Darrell Schweitzer

- Cover of first edition
- Author: edited by George H. Scithers and Darrell Schweitzer
- Cover artist: Doug Beekman
- Language: English
- Genre: Science fiction short stories
- Publisher: Avon Books
- Publication date: 1987
- Publication place: United States
- Media type: Print (paperback)
- Pages: viii, 248 pp.
- ISBN: 0-380-75650-1
- Preceded by: Tales from the Spaceport Bar

Another Round at the Spaceport Bar is an anthology of science fiction and fantasy club tales edited by George H. Scithers and Darrell Schweitzer. It was first published in paperback by Avon Books in April 1989. The first British edition was issued in paperback by New English Library in January 1992.

== Summary ==
The book collects eighteen novelettes and short stories by various science fiction and fantasy authors (including the editors themselves), with an introduction by W. T. Quick.

== Contents ==
- "Introduction: 'In Vino Veritas?'" (W. T. Quick)
- "The Far King" (Richard Wilson)
- "The Altar at Midnight" (C. M. Kornbluth)
- "Princess" (Morgan Llywelyn)
- "The Subject Is Closed" (Larry Niven)
- "The Persecutor's Tale" (John M. Ford)
- "Longshot" (Jack C. Haldeman II)
- "Finnegan's" (W. T. Quick)
- "The Oldest Soldier" (Fritz Leiber)
- "The Ultimate Crime" (Isaac Asimov)
- "—All You Zombies—" (Robert A. Heinlein)
- "The Immortal Bard" (Isaac Asimov)
- "Anyone Here from Utah?" (Michael Swanwick)
- "Cold Victory" (Poul Anderson)
- "C.O.D." (Jonathan Milos)
- "Pennies from Hell" (Darrell Schweitzer)
- "Not Polluted Enough" (George H. Scithers)
- "Well Bottled at Slab's" (John Gregory Betancourt)
- "The Three Sailors' Gambit" (Lord Dunsany)

== Reception ==
Brian Magorrian, writing in Paperback Inferno no. 78, 1989, notes that "not all of the 18 stories printed are based in bars - some more famous authors get in with dinner parties and the like." He went on that "[a]lthough none of the stories made me think 'Wow!' there were a few good 'uns," among which he singles out the pieces by Niven and Schweitzer. He "only actually disliked three, [which] may have been due more to who wrote them (Asimov and Heinlein) than any actual merit." In contrast, Jon Wallace, also in Paperback Inferno, calls the Heinlein piece "wonderful," as well as praising the story by Leiber. He also comments without assessment on one of the pieces by Asimov and the contributions from Quick, Llywelyn, Betancourt, Mylos, and Swanwick. Overall, he questions whether "a thematic collection about bars and barflies works," and concludes "not really. Some of these stories are classics, some are excellent tales, but taken as a whole, the inevitable sameness becomes oppressive. Definitely a dipping-into book."

Keith Freeman, in Vector, delivers judicious capsule summaries of all the tales, highlighting the Wilson for "[h]umour with a serious point," the Kornbluth for the "punch in the tail-almost a prerequisite for the 'ideal' bar story," the Llywelyn as "[o]verlong ... again relying heavily on the sting," the Niven for "a paradox to solve, or think about, in an entertaining way," the Haldeman as "lovely" and "comically told," the first Asimov as "[f]air, but not, to my mind, a proper bar tale," the Betancourt as "pure fun fantasy with logic shining through the magic," and the Dunsany as "a little dated and ... a little thin but ... still worth reading."
