= The Conan Reader =

Book by Lyon Sprague de Camp

- The Conan Reader by L. Sprague de Camp, Mirage Press, 1968
- Author: L. Sprague de Camp
- Illustrator: Roy G. Krenkel
- Cover artist: Bernie Wrightson
- Language: English
- Genre: Sword and sorcery essays
- Publisher: Mirage Press
- Publication date: 1968
- Publication place: United States
- Media type: Print (Hardback)
- Pages: 148 pp

The Conan Reader is a 1968 essay collection by L. Sprague de Camp, published in hardcover by Mirage Press. The essays were originally published as articles in George H. Scithers' fanzine Amra. Mirage subsequently published two companion volumes of essays from The Conan Swordbook (1969) and The Conan Grimoire (1972). Most of the material in the three volumes, together with some additional material, was later reprinted in two de Camp-edited paperback anthologies from Ace Books; The Blade of Conan (1979) and The Spell of Conan (1980).

== Summary ==
The book consists of thirteen pieces on fantasy writer Robert E. Howard and his seminal sword and sorcery hero Conan the Barbarian, Howard's sources and literary successors, and other fantasy authors such as Fletcher Pratt, Leslie Barringer, and L. Ron Hubbard.

== Contents ==
- “Conan’s Ghost”
- “Memories of R.E.H.”
- “The Trail of Tranicos”
- “Hyborian Technology”
- “Pirettes”
- “Conan and Matho”
- “Conan and Pizarro”
- “Conan’s Great-Grandfather”
- “Conan’s Imitators”
- “Pratt’s Parallel Worlds”
- “Knights and Knaves in Neustria”
- “El-Ron and the City of Brass”
- “An Exegesis of Howard’s Hyborian Tales”
