= Mills Cross Array =

Radio telescope

- Location: Washington, D.C., District of Columbia
- Wavelength: 22.2 MHz (13.5 m)

The Mills Cross Array, or the 96-acre antenna array, was a Mills Cross Telescope-style radio telescope located in Seneca Maryland, near Washington, D.C. Constructed in June, 1954, it was operated by the Carnegie Institution of Washington. The full array consisted of two arms, each 2047 feet in length with 66 dipole antennas. The dipole antennas were supported by unpainted wooden poles, connected with wires. The telescope had around 5 miles (8.0 km) of wire, with an army surplus truck housing the phase-switching radio receiver. It was built to conduct a 22.2 MHz (13.5 meter) sky survey, and at that frequency it had a beam about 2.5 degrees wide.

In 1955 the array was used by Bernard F. Burke and Kenneth Franklin to discover 22.2 MHz radio emission from Jupiter, which they tentatively attributed to thunderstorm-like activity in Jupiter's atmosphere. Although radio waves had been detected from astronomical sources as early as 1931, this was the first detection of radio waves from another planet.

The field where the array was located is now part of the McKee-Beshers Wildlife Management Area.
