= The Spell of Conan =

Book by Lyon Sprague de Camp

- The Spell of Conan edited by L. Sprague de Camp, Ace Books, 1980
- Author: L. Sprague de Camp (editor)
- Language: English
- Series: Conan the Barbarian
- Genre: Sword and sorcery Essays
- Publisher: Ace Books
- Publication date: 1980
- Publication place: United States
- Media type: Print (Paperback)
- Pages: x, 244 pp
- ISBN: 0-441-11669-8
- OCLC: 6845304

The Spell of Conan is a 1980 collection of essays, poems and fiction edited by L. Sprague de Camp, published in paperback by Ace Books. The material was originally published as articles in George H. Scithers' fanzine Amra. The book is a companion to Ace's earlier volume of material from Amra, The Blade of Conan (1979). Most of the material in the two volumes, together with some additional material, was reprinted from three previous books issued in hardcover by Mirage Press; de Camp's collection The Conan Reader (1968), and the de Camp and Scithers-edited anthologies The Conan Swordbook (1969). and The Conan Grimoire (1972).

== Summary ==
The book consists of thirty-seven pieces, mostly essays on fantasy writer Robert E. Howard and his seminal sword and sorcery hero Conan the Barbarian, Howard's sources and literary successors, and other fantasy authors such as Edgar Rice Burroughs, E. R. Eddison, Lord Dunsany, Jack Vance, Fletcher Pratt, Leslie Barringer, Fritz Leiber, Sax Rohmer and Talbot Mundy. Some original material by Howard, a number of fantasy poems and a few fictional pieces are also included.

== Contents ==
- “Swordsmen and Sorcerers at Play” (Lin Carter)
- “Skald in the Post Oaks” (L. Sprague de Camp)
- “Howard’s Style” (Fritz Leiber)
- “The Ghost of Camp Colorado” (Robert E. Howard)
- “Conan’s Ghost” (L. Sprague de Camp)
- “Untitled Fragment” (“The wind from…”) (Robert E. Howard)
- “The Trail of Tranicos” (L. Sprague de Camp)
- “Balthus of Cross Plains” (George H. Scithers)
- “Something About Eve” (Robert E. Howard)
- “The Testament of Snefru” (John Boardman)
- “The Lion’s Bridge” (Ray Capella)
- “When Set Fled” (Fritz Leiber)
- “Eddison’s Zimiamvian Trilogy” (Robert E. Briney)
- “Conan’s Great-Grandfather” (L. Sprague de Camp)
- “The Dying Earth” (Robert E. Briney)
- “Pratt’s Parallel Worlds” (L. Sprague de Camp)
- “Of Worms and Unicorns” (David Hulan)
- “Knights and Knaves in Neustria” (L. Sprague de Camp)
- “Fafhrd and Me” (Fritz Leiber)
- “Conan’s Imitators” (L. Sprague de Camp)
- “The Thong of Thor” (John Boardman)
- “Woe is Me” (Avram Davidson)
- “Transposition” (L. Sprague de Camp)
- “Thoth-Amon’s Complaint” (L. Sprague de Camp)
- “The Gray Mouser 1” (Fritz Leiber)
- “The Gray Mouser 2” (Fritz Leiber)
- “Precursors and Prototypes: 1. Pirettes” (L. Sprague de Camp)
- “Precursors and Prototypes: 2. The Insidious Doctor Conan” (L. Sprague de Camp)
- “Precursors and Prototypes: 3. The Conans of Albion” (L. Sprague de Camp)
- “Who Were the AEsir?” (Poul Anderson)
- “Howard and the Celts” (L. Sprague de Camp)
- “Who Was Crom?” (Albert E. Gechter)
- “Conan and Matho” (L. Sprague de Camp)
- “John Carter: Sword of Theosophy” (Fritz Leiber)
- “Conan and Pizarro” (L. Sprague de Camp)
- “Lord of the Black Throne” (P. Schuyler Miller)
- “The Heroic Barbarian” (L. Sprague de Camp)
