= The Conan Grimoire =

Book by Lyon Sprague de Camp

- L. Sprague de Camp and George H. Scithers, Mirage Press, 1972
- Author: L. Sprague de Camp; George H. Scithers (editors)
- Cover artist: Berni Wrightson
- Language: English
- Genre: Sword and sorcery, Essays, Poetry
- Publisher: Mirage Press
- Publication date: 1972
- Publication place: United States
- Media type: Print (Hardback)
- Pages: 261 pp

The Conan Grimoire is a 1972 collection of essays, poetry and fiction edited by L. Sprague de Camp and George H. Scithers, published in hardcover by Mirage Press. The essays were originally published as articles in Scithers' fanzine Amra. The book is a companion to Mirage’s previous two volumes of material from Amra, The Conan Reader (1968) and The Conan Swordbook (1969). Most of the material in the three volumes, together with some additional material, was later reprinted in two de Camp-edited paperback anthologies from Ace Books; The Blade of Conan (1979) and The Spell of Conan (1980).

== Summary ==
The book consists of thirty-seven pieces, mostly essays on fantasy writer Robert E. Howard and his seminal sword and sorcery hero Conan the Barbarian, Howard's sources and literary successors, and other fantasy authors such as Edgar Rice Burroughs, E. R. Eddison, Jack Vance, Fritz Leiber and Talbot Mundy. Some original material by Howard, a number of fantasy poems and a few fictional pieces are also included.

== Contents ==
- “Swordsmen and Sorcerers at Play” (Lin Carter)
- “Letters to Clark Ashton Smith” (Robert E. Howard)
- “Balthus of Cross Plains” (George H. Scithers)
- “Something About Eve” (Robert E. Howard)
- “Howard’s Style” (Fritz Leiber)
- “Untitled Fragment” (“The wind from…”) (Robert E. Howard)
- “John Carter and His Electric Barsoom” (Thomas Stratton)
- “The Agent” (Björn Nyberg)
- “When Set Fled” (Fritz Leiber)
- “The Testament of Snefru” (John Boardman)
- “The Lion’s Bridge” (Ray Capella)
- “Eddison’s Zimiamvian Trilogy” (Robert E. Briney)
- “Of Worms and Unicorns” (David Hulan)
- “The Dying Earth” (Robert E. Briney)
- “Fafhrd and Me” (Fritz Leiber)
- “A Man Named John” (John Pocsik)
- “Transposition” (L. Sprague de Camp)
- “The Gray Mouser 1” (Fritz Leiber)
- “The Gray Mouser 2” (Fritz Leiber)
- “I Remember Conan” (Grace A. Warren)
- “Stamford Bridge” (Poul Anderson)
- “The Free-Speaking Verses” (Poul Anderson)
- “The Loss of a Son” (Poul Anderson)
- “Woe is Me” (Avram Davidson)
- “Carter’s Little Whiskey Stills” (John Boardman)
- “The Thong of Thor” (John Boardman)
- “Ghost Ships” (L. Sprague de Camp)
- “Tiger in the Rain” (L. Sprague de Camp)
- “What Really Happened” (C. C. Hebron)
- “One Man’s BEM” (R. Bretnor)
- “Kush” (L. Sprague de Camp)
- “A Furthest Note on the Red Planet” (E. Hoffmann Price)
- “Arming the Incomplete Enchanter” (Jerry E. Pournelle)
- “Richard the Lion-Hearted is Alive and Well in California” (Poul Anderson)
- “Mundy’s Vendhya” (L. Sprague de Camp)
- “Young Man Mulligan”, with Key (various)
- “Drinking Songs from ‘Silverlock’” (John Myers Myers)
