= John Davison (composer) =

American composer and pianist

John H. Davison (31 May 1930 – 5 March 1999) was an American composer and pianist.

== Life and career ==
Born in Istanbul, Turkey, he grew up in Upstate New York and in New York City, and studied music at the Juilliard School's lower school, Haverford College, then received his master's degree from Harvard University, where he focused on Renaissance music, particularly the works of Orlando Gibbons. He earned his doctorate in creative composition from the Eastman School of Music. His teachers included Alfred Swan, Randall Thompson, Walter Piston, Bernard Rogers, Howard Hanson, Alan Hovhaness, and Robert Palmer. During 1964-1965, Davison was placed in the Kansas City (Missouri) Schools as part of the Music Educators National Conference's Contemporary Music Project, where he composed numerous works for band, chorus, and orchestra. He was a friend of Aaron Copland and maintained a correspondence with him. He was also a conscientious objector.

Davison's music is generally tonal, strongly melodic, and influenced by such diverse musics as Western classical and Romantic music (particularly the music of Johannes Brahms, Renaissance and Baroque music, Irish music, English country dancing, Anglican church music, and jazz.

His music is published by Southern Music Publishing Co., Shawnee Press, and TAP Music Publishing, and his music has been recorded by the CRI, Crystal, Coronet, Encore, and Albany labels. He coauthored, with John Ashmead, a book about the songs of Robert Burns.

Davison taught at Haverford College from 1959 until his death. He was survived by his wife, Elizabeth Davison. One of his students at Haverford was Robert Sataloff.

== Works ==
- 1957 - Sonata for Trombone and Piano
- 1963 - Concerto for Harpsichord and Strings
- 1967 - Canzona and Chorale, 4 flutes
- 1967 - Suite, 8 brass instruments (2 horns, 2 trumpets, 3 trombones, and tuba)
- 1967 - Symphony no. 2 for Band
- 1968 - Suite, flute, violin, and piano
- 1968-69 - Sextet, English horn, violin, viola, violoncello, bass viola da gamba, and piano
- 1971 - Prelude and Rhapsody for Euphonium
- 1977 - Concertino for oboe and chamber orchestra
- 1980 - Sonata, euphonium (or trombone), tuba, and piano, Opus 73
- 1980 - Symphony no. 5
- 1983 - Arthur's Return, bagpipes and string orchestra
- 1985 - Sinfonia, cimbalon and chamber orchestra
- 1986 - Quintet, for trombone and string quartet
- 1986 - Suite for Six Trombones
- 1991 - Canzona & Reel/Jig, 4 flutes
- 1993 - Over the Mountain, Op. 115, orchestra
- 1994 - Cello Concerto, Op. 120
- 1996 - Sonata for Horn and Piano

== Discography ==
- 1996 - Music of John Davison. Albany Records.
