= Bernard Mills =

Australian engineer and radio astronomy pioneer

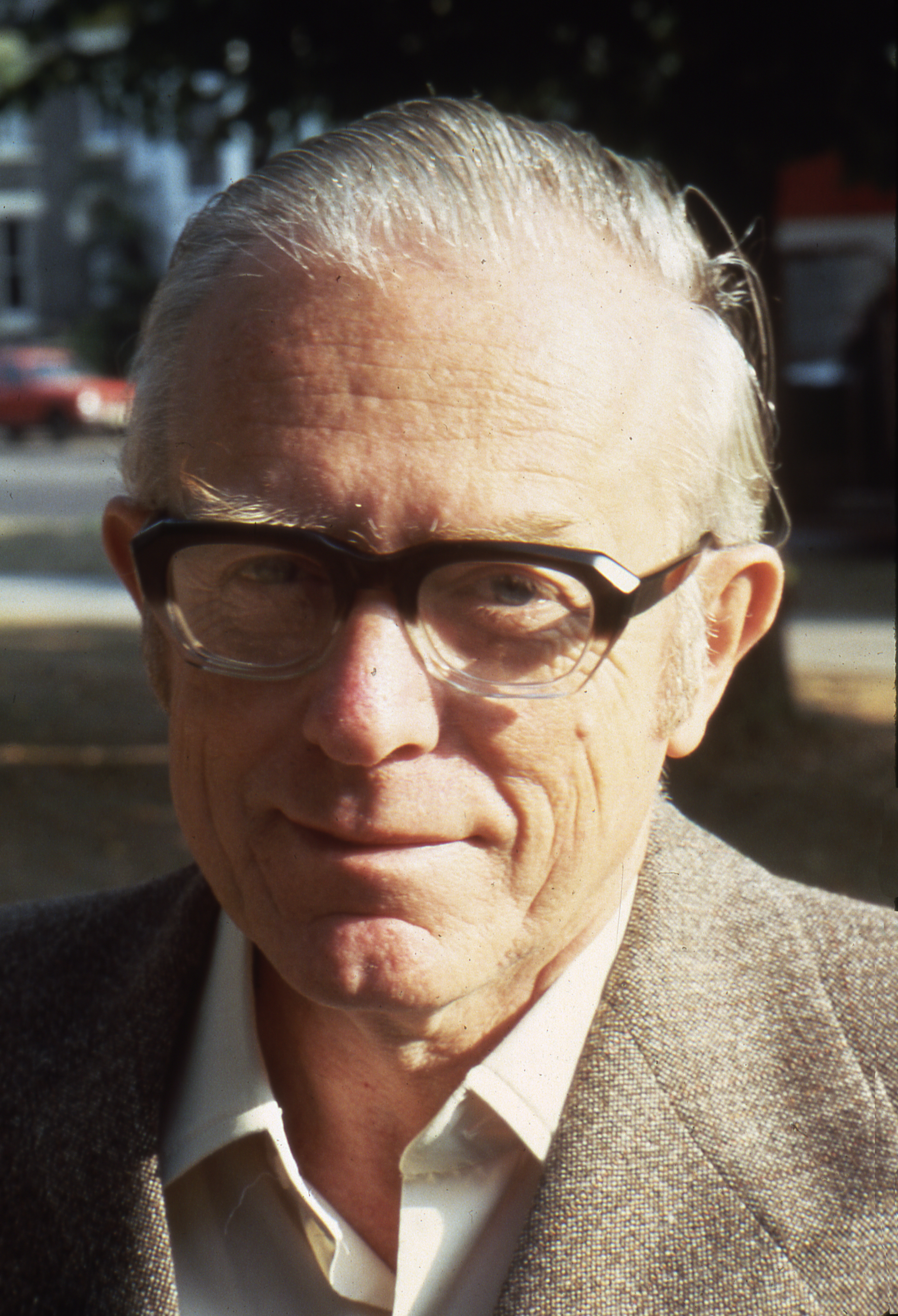
- Mills in 1976
- Born: Bernard Yarnton Mills; 8 August 1920; Manly
- Died: 25 April 2011 (aged 90); Sydney
- Awards: Fellow of the Royal Society

Bernard Yarnton Mills AC, FRS, FAA, DSc(Eng) (8 August 1920 – 25 April 2011) was an Australian engineer and a pioneer of radio astronomy in Australia, responsible for the design and implementation of the Mills Cross Telescope and the Molonglo Cross Telescope.

== Life ==
Bernard Mills was born on 8 August 1920 in Manly. His father, Ellice Mills, was an architect who had migrated from England before the First World War. His mother, Sylphide Dinwiddie, was a dance teacher from New Zealand.

He was educated at the King's School, and at the age of 16, was awarded a scholarship to study engineering at the University of Sydney. He completed his degree in 1942, and was awarded first class honours in 1950 for his thesis A Million-Volt Resonant-Cavity X-ray Tube presented for his Master of Engineering degree. In 1942 he married Lerida Karmalsky, who won the Australian Chess championship in 1940 at the age of 18, and they had 3 children. In 1969 Lerida died; the following year he married Crys, who had two children of similar age to Mills' children.

In 1948 he commenced working with the CSIR's newly formed radio astronomy group, where he had the idea for what became known as the Mills Cross radio telescope; the first Mills Cross Telescope became operational in 1954. In 1959 he became a doctor of science in engineering. In 1960 he was appointed reader in physics at the University of Sydney, where he developed the concept for the "Super Cross". In 1965 he was appointed professor of physics (astrophysics). The Molonglo Cross Telescope became operational in 1967.

He was retired by the university in 1985.

== Awards and honours ==
- 1957 Thomas Ranken Lyle Medal
- 1959 Elected Fellow of the Australian Academy of Science (FAA)
- 1963 Fellow of the Royal Society (FRS)
- 1967 Shared the Britannica Australia Award for Science.
- 1976 Appointed Companion of the Order of Australia (AC), but refused to accept it from then Governor General Sir John Kerr, waiting until Kerr's resignation before accepting.
- 2006 Awarded the Grote Reber Gold Medal for Radio Astronomy.
