= The Acquisitive Chuckle =

1971 mystery short story by American writer Isaac Asimov

"The Acquisitive Chuckle" is a mystery short story by American writer Isaac Asimov in 1971, first published in the January 1972 issue of Ellery Queen's Mystery Magazine. He originally called it "The Chuckle", but the magazine's title was kept in subsequent uses of the story. It was the first of Asimov's stories about the Black Widowers, an eccentric group of men who met once a month. The group is based loosely upon the Trap Door Spiders, a stag-club of which Asimov was a member.

The Black Widowers stories concerned a dinner guest who had a problem or mystery to solve; after the members deliberated, Henry the waiter would offer the correct solution. This story, the first, deviates from that pattern in the nature of Henry's "contribution".

== Plot summary ==
Each month, the Black Widowers meet at a restaurant and converse over dinner with each other and their waiter. The host of the group brings the evening's guest. On this occasion, Geoffrey Avalon brings a Dr. Hanley Bartram to dinner. (All members of the club and all guests for the evening are referred to as doctors, and those with doctorates are referred to as "doctor doctor.")

Bartram tells the group of two business partners, Mr. Jackson and Mr. Anderson, the former tirelessly honest and the latter relentlessly dishonest. Anderson shunted Jackson out of their venture, and shortly afterward spotted him acting in a suspicious manner inside Anderson's cluttered house, leading Anderson to suspect that the honest Jackson had stolen something. Unfortunately, due to the variety and extent of the objects within the dwelling, Anderson was unable to tell what was taken. He called in Bartram, who is an investigator, to discover what had been taken. When he failed, Anderson grew restless and morose, until he slowly wasted away.

The group tosses around theories as to what had been stolen, until Bartram reveals his true reason for attending the meeting: their waiter, Henry, is none other than the honest businessman in question. He asks Henry what it was that he stole from Anderson, and Henry replies that he had only taken Anderson's peace of mind.

== Characters ==
=== Black Widowers ===
- Geoffrey Avalon: Patent attorney; described as tall and patrician
- Thomas Trumbull: Code expert of an unknown level; loud and argumentative in nature
- Emmanuel Rubin: Free-lance author; talkative, self-centered, finicky (about food), and argumentative
- Mario Gonzalo: Artist; as argumentative as Trumbull, if not as loud
- James Drake: Chemist with a pulp-fiction fetish
- Henry (honorary member): Waiter; polite, restrained, and unceasingly honest in nature

=== Other ===
- Hanley Bartram: Private investigator
- Mr Anderson: Businessman; greedy with an obsession with collections
