= John Drury Clark =

American chemist and writer (1907–1988)

- Born: August 15, 1907; Fairbanks, Alaska
- Died: July 6, 1988 (aged 80); Denville, New Jersey
- Occupations: Scientist, writer, rocket fuel developer, chemist
- Writing career
- Pen name: John D. Clark
- Genres: Nonfiction, science fiction
- Notable work: Ignition! An Informal History of Liquid Rocket Propellants

John Drury Clark, Ph.D. (August 15, 1907 – July 6, 1988) was an American rocket fuel developer, chemist, and science fiction writer. He was instrumental in the revival of interest in Robert E. Howard's Conan stories and influenced the writing careers of L. Sprague de Camp, Fletcher Pratt, and other authors.

== Life and career ==
Clark was born in Fairbanks, Alaska. He attended the University of Alaska, and then the California Institute of Technology at Pasadena, California from 1927 to 1930, graduating with a B.S. in Physical Chemistry. During his last two years at Caltech his college roommate was future science fiction author L. Sprague de Camp. He received an M.S. from the University of Wisconsin–Madison, and, in 1934, a PhD from Stanford University.

In 1933 Clark published a novel spiral chart of the periodic system of the chemical elements. This design was used by Life Magazine for a striking and influential illustration as part of a special number on the elements, 16 May 1949. It inspired the artist Edgar Longman, whose mural was a prominent exhibit in the Festival of Britain science exhibition, London, 1951. Clark came up with a new version in 1950, but this did not have the same success.

Clark moved to Schenectady in Upstate New York in the early 1930s, taking a job with General Electric. A few years later he moved to New York City. He was living in Philadelphia and working as a research chemist for John Wyeth & Brother of that city in 1943. On June 7 of that year he married operatic soprano singer Mildred Baldwin. Their marriage later ended in divorce.

From 1949 to his retirement in 1970, Clark developed liquid propellants at the Naval Air Rocket Test Station at Dover, New Jersey (known as the Liquid Rocket Propulsion Laboratory of Picatinny Arsenal after 1960). His title there was chief chemist.

In 1962 he married artist Inga Pratt, widow of Fletcher Pratt.

Clark was the author of Ignition! An Informal History of Liquid Rocket Propellants (Rutgers University Press, 1972) which he dedicated to his wife Inga. The book was based on his experiences in the field and chronicled the development of liquid rocket propellant technology, through technical explanations of the work the propellant community produced as well as often humorous anecdotes and incidents about the people involved. The Rutgers University Press began republishing Ignition! An Informal History of Liquid Rocket Propellants in May 2018.

During the Clarks' married life they lived in an "unconventional" house in Newfoundland, in the Green Pond section of Rockaway Township, Morris County, New Jersey, where Clark continued to reside in his later years, until his death. He died on July 6, 1988, after a long illness and series of strokes at St. Clare's Hospital in Denville, New Jersey, near his home.

Clark's papers, consisting of four cubic feet of correspondence, drafts of scientific and science fiction publications, notes, an unpublished typescript memoir, diaries (1923–1984), clippings, and photos, are preserved in the Special Collections at Virginia Tech as part of the repository's Archives of American Aerospace Exploration.

== Literary career and influence ==
As a fan of the science fiction and fantasy magazines of the pulp era, Clark became friendly with several figures who were or would become authors in both fields, including P. Schuyler Miller, Fletcher Pratt, and L. Ron Hubbard. He met Miller while living in Schenectady in the 1930s, and made the acquaintance of Pratt after moving to New York City. He later introduced de Camp to Miller, Pratt, and the informal circle of aspirant New York science fiction writers that included Otto Binder, John W. Campbell, Edmond Hamilton, Otis Adelbert Kline, Henry Kuttner, Frank Belknap Long, Manly Wade Wellman, and Jack Williamson.

=== Clark and Conan ===
Clark first encountered Robert E. Howard's fantasies of Kull, Conan and Solomon Kane in the magazine Weird Tales. He became an avid fan, and together with Miller he worked out an outline of Conan's career and a map of the world in Howard's invented Hyborian Age in early 1936 from the then-published stories. Miller sent this material to Howard, whose reply confirmed and corrected their findings. Their map became the basis of those that later appeared in the book editions of the Conan stories. Their revised outline, "A Probable Outline of Conan's Career" was published in the fanzine The Hyborian Age in 1938.

Thus established as an authority on Conan, Clark was invited to edit and provide introductions for the first book editions of Howard's Conan stories, published by Gnome Press in the 1950s. Expanded versions of his and Miller's essay on Conan, retitled "An Informal Biography of Conan the Cimmerian", appeared in the Gnome volume The Coming of Conan in 1953 and (revised by de Camp) in the fanzine Amra, vol. 2, no. 4, in 1959. It was the source of the linking passages between the individual Conan stories in both the Gnome editions and the Lancer paperback editions of the 1960s.

Clark and Miller's Hyborian Age map, together with Howard's own original, are the basis of those published in the Gnome, Lancer, and later editions of the stories.

=== Clark and the science fiction community ===
While unemployed in the mid-1930s Clark wrote a couple of science fiction stories, "Minus Planet" and "Space Blister", with plotting assistance from L. Sprague de Camp, which were published in Astounding Stories in 1937. "Minus Planet" was the first science fiction story to deal with antimatter. When additional stories failed to sell he abandoned fiction writing while remaining active in science fiction circles. This experience did, however, prompt de Camp to launch his own career as a science fiction writer, first with short stories and then with a novel in collaboration with their mutual friend Miller.

Clark furthered de Camp's career in another way by introducing him into Fletcher Pratt's war-gaming circle, and to Pratt himself, in 1939. De Camp and Pratt went on to write some of the most celebrated light fantasy of the 1940s, the Harold Shea and Gavagan's Bar stories.

Clark also provided L. Ron Hubbard with the germ for his humorous fantasy novella The Case of the Friendly Corpse, published in the August 1941 issue of Unknown. According to de Camp, in the 1930s Clark and a friend named Mark Baldwin had "concocted a prospectus for an imaginary College of the Unholy Names", which Clark lent to Hubbard in 1941. Hubbard then built his story around the setting.

Clark's first marriage led to the establishment of the all-male literary banqueting club the Trap Door Spiders, founded in 1944 by Pratt. As the new Mrs. Clark was reportedly unpopular with Pratt and others of his friends, the club gave them an excuse to spend time with him without her. The Trap Door Spiders later served as the model for Isaac Asimov's fictional group of mystery solvers the Black Widowers. Clark himself was fictionalized as the James Drake character.

In 1952 Clark provided the scenario for and edited the Twayne Science Fiction Triplet The Petrified Planet, which has been described as "the first 'shared world' anthology". The scenario postulated a star system inhabited by silicon-based life forms, and was used as the basis for the three novellas by Pratt, H. Beam Piper and Judith Merril forming the body of the work. An excerpt from Clark's introduction ("The Silicone World") was reissued in the December, 1952 issue of Startling Stories, and the whole was reprinted in the 1983 Ace edition of Piper's contribution to the book, Uller Uprising. However, the Startling Stories excerpt has also been credited to Pratt, who supposedly utilized Clark's name as a pseudonym.

Isaac Asimov, whom Clark first met in 1942, wrote the foreword to his book Ignition!

== Bibliography ==
=== Science fiction ===
- "Minus Planet", published in Astounding Stories, Apr 1937.
- "Space Blister", published in Astounding Stories, Aug 1937.

=== Nonfiction ===
- "A new periodic chart", Journal of Chemical Education, 10, 675-657 (1933), doi:10.1021/ed010p675.
- "A modern periodic chart of chemical elements", Science, 111, 661-663 (1950), doi:10.1126/science.111.2894.661.
- "A Probable Outline of Conan's Career", with P. Schuyler Miller, published in The Hyborian Age (1938).
- "Introduction" to The Petrified Planet (1952) (reused for Uller Uprising, by H. Beam Piper (1983)).
- "The Silicone World", published in Startling Stories, December 1952.
- "An Informal Biography of Conan the Cimmerian", with P. Schuyler Miller, published in The Coming of Conan (1953).
- "An Informal Biography of Conan the Cimmerian", with P. Schuyler Miller and L. Sprague de Camp, published in Amra, vol. 2, no. 4, (1959) and in
  - L. Sprague de Camp, ed. (1979). The Blade of Conan. Ace Books. ISBN 978-0-441-11670-6.
- "Science Fact: Dimensions, Anyone?" published in Analog Science Fiction - Science Fact, November 1966.
- Ignition!: An Informal History of Liquid Rocket Propellants. Rutgers University Press. 23 May 2018. p. 302. ISBN 978-0-8135-9918-2. OCLC 281664.

== See also ==
- Trap Door Spiders
- Conan chronologies
