= Truth to Tell =

1972 short story by Isaac Asimov

"Truth to Tell" is a 1972 short story by Isaac Asimov. It is one of Asimov's series of stories about the Black Widowers, a gentlemen's dining club that meets monthly to solve mysteries and puzzles. It was first published in the October 1972 issue of Ellery Queen's Mystery Magazine under the title "The Man Who Never Told A Lie", and was included in the 1974 collection Tales of the Black Widowers.

== Plot summary ==
Six middle-aged professional men have a dining club called the Black Widowers. One of the members, Mario Gonzalo, invites a guest named John Sand, whom Gonzalo describes as a man who "never tells a lie." Sand explains to the Widowers that he is accused of stealing cash and negotiable bonds from his uncle's company. Sand admits that, as a gambler, he was in urgent need of money, and is one of the few people who know the combination to the company's safe. Yet he repeatedly assures the Widowers: "I did not take the cash or the bonds." After much questioning of Sand by the Widowers, the club's waiter, Henry, solves the puzzle by observing that "many a literal truth tells a lie by implication." With Sand glaring at him, Henry asks him one question: "Did you, by any chance, take the cash and the bonds?" Without answering Henry, Sand takes his coat and departs, reminding the Widowers that their rules forbid them to disclose dinner conversations outside the club.

== Reception ==
C.D. Stewart remarked that the story's resolution "hinges on an extremely obscure point of linguistics and... would probably only be amusing to a linguistics professional." Nevertheless, the story was selected by editor Otto Penzler for inclusion in the 1998 anthology The 50 Greatest Mysteries of All Time.

== See also ==
- Tales of the Black Widowers
