= Tales from the Spaceport Bar =

Science fiction anthology, published 1987

- Cover of first edition
- Author: edited by George H. Scithers and Darrell Schweitzer
- Cover artist: James Warhola
- Language: English
- Genre: Science fiction
- Publisher: Avon Books
- Publication date: 1987
- Publication place: United States
- Media type: Print (paperback)
- Pages: xv, 235 pp.
- ISBN: 0-380-89943-4
- Followed by: Another Round at the Spaceport Bar

Tales from the Spaceport Bar is an anthology of science fiction club tales edited by George H. Scithers and Darrell Schweitzer. It was first published in paperback by Avon Books in January 1987. The first British edition was issued in paperback by New English Library in 1988.

== Summary ==
The book collects twenty-one short stories and one poem by various science fiction authors, with a preface by the editors.

== Contents ==
- "Preface" (George H. Scithers and Darrell Schweitzer)
- "The Green Marauder" (Larry Niven)
- "Don't Look Now" (Henry Kuttner)
- "Getting Even" (Isaac Asimov)
- "What Goes Up" (Arthur C. Clarke)
- "Social Lapses" (poem) (Darrell Schweitzer)
- "One for the Road" (Gardner Dozois)
- "Elephas Frumenti" (L. Sprague de Camp and Fletcher Pratt)
- "Unicorn Variation" (Roger Zelazny)
- "Strategy at the Billiards Club" (Lord Dunsany)
- "Through Time & Space with Ferdinand Feghoot!" (Grendel Briarton)
- "On the Rocks at Slab's" (John Gregory Betancourt)
- "Hands of the Man" (R. A. Lafferty)
- "Endurance Vile" (Steven Barnes)
- "The Centipede's Dilemma" (Spider Robinson)
- "The Causes" (Margaret St. Clair)
- "For a Foggy Night" (Larry Niven)
- "They Loved Me in Utica" (Avram Davidson)
- "A Pestilence of Psychoanalysts" (Janet O. Jeppson)
- "The Regulars" (Robert Silverberg)
- "The Man Who Always Knew" (Algis Budrys)
- "Infinite Resources" (Randall Garrett)
- "What's Wrong with This Picture?" (Barry B. Longyear, John M. Ford and George H. Scithers)

== Reception ==
The anthology was reviewed by Dan Chow in Locus no. 311, December 1986, Andy Sawyer in Paperback Inferno no. 64, 1987, Jerry L. Parsons in Fantasy Review, March 1987, and Tom Easton in Analog Science Fiction/Science Fact, June 1987.
