= John Ashmead =

American novelist, naval intelligence officer, and professor of English (1917–1992)

John Ashmead (1917–1992) was an American novelist, naval intelligence officer, and professor of English. His writings include The Mountain and the Feather about his experiences in the Pacific in World War II as a United States naval intelligence officer and translator. He received a commendation for obtaining information that helped Navy fliers shoot down the plane of Japanese Admiral Isoroku Yamamoto, who had planned the 1941 Attack on Pearl Harbor. He co-authored The Songs of Robert Burns in 1988 with Professor John Davison. His PhD thesis was The Idea of Japan 1853-1895: Japan as Described by American and Other Travellers from the West. Ashmead was a graduate of the Navy Japanese language program at the University of Colorado, Boulder and Berkeley. He was a professor of English at Haverford College from 1948 to 1988. At Haverford, he pioneered the use of computers in education and research. He spoke as Fulbright lecturer in Osaka and Kyoto, Japan, Taipei, Varanasi, India and throughout India, and also taught in Athens, Greece at Athens College for Boys.

== Education ==
He received his B.A. in 1938, his M.A. in 1939 and his Ph.D. in 1950, all from Harvard University.

== Biography ==
Ashmead was born on August 22, 1917, in New York City. He was the son of John and Mildred Ashmead nee Hinkel. He married Ann Harnwell on October 15, 1949. They had five children: John Ashmead, Graham Gaylord Ashmead, Gaylord Harnwell Ashmead, Louisa Harral Ashmead and Theodora Wheeler Ashmead. They divorced in 1976. Dr. Ann Harnwell Ashmead was an expert on Greek Vases of the 5th Century BC. Ashmead graduated from Loomis Institute in 1934 (Loomis Chaffee). In 1938, he graduated from Harvard University magna cum laude with a Bachelor of Arts having lived at Lowell House. He studied Japanese at Harvard since his grandfather Albert Sydney Ashmead had worked in Tokyo, Japan, as a doctor during the 19th century. After college, he worked as a reporter for the Hartford Times. He was a member of the Modern Language Association. He was vice-chair of the School and College Conference on English. He was also a member of the Association for Asian Studies, Authors League of America, Authors Guild, American Studies Association and Phi Beta Kappa. He was a member of the Trap Door Spiders. He was a frequent contributor to The Atlantic. and also wrote book reviews for The Philadelphia Bulletin. Ashmead published on Bernard Malamud, Mark Twain, among several American authors. He died of lymphoma on February 7, 1992, in Bryn Mawr, Pennsylvania and was buried in Windsor, CT.

== Students who became authors ==
Ashmead taught a group of students mainly at Haverford College who through his encouragement and guidance, went on to become published authors themselves. These included Ashmead's student John Davison (composer) with whom he published a book about Robert Burns, Ashmead's student Claudine Monteil who published on Simone de Beauvoir and Ashmead's student Frank Conroy who Ashmead recommended to attend the Iowa Writers Workshop. Frank Conroy later wrote a story about John Ashmead in GQ titled "My Tormented Mentor", and later republished as "My Teacher" in his publication of collected stories Dogs Bark, but the Caravan Rolls On. Conroy took Creative Writing classes with Ashmead while at Haverford College, and later attributed to Ashmead that the method of how he taught creative writing was the way he taught creative writing at the Iowa Writers' Workshop where Conroy himself influenced, inspired and encouraged a whole new generation of American writers. Other Haverford College English students include Dave Barry.

== Circle of Authors ==
Ashmead became acquainted and friends with a circle of authors including Masao Kume and Yasunari Kawabata who he met and befriended during the Occupation of Japan in mid-1940s, G.V. Desani and P. Lal who he met in 1964-1965 while teaching on a Fulbright in India and working for the Asia Society and the Indian Studies Center then at the University of Pennsylvania to produce an Anthology on Modern Indian Short Fiction, Wright Morris and later L. Sprague de Camp, and Isaac Asimov, and the Scottish poet Iain Crichton Smith, among others.

== Network of U.S. Navy Japanese Language School graduates and intellectuals ==
Ashmead maintained a network of contacts with key administrators and graduates of the World War II U.S. Navy Japanese Language School which began at Harvard and later migrated to Berkeley, California, and ultimately Boulder, Colorado. These friends and student-war personnel colleagues include Serge Elisséeff, Donald Keene, Otis Cary, Leslie A. Feidler, Marion J. Levy, Jr., Jonas Barish and Beate Sirota Gordon who went on after World War II, to become leading intellectuals in their academic fields.

== Books and articles ==
- The Mountain and the Feather
- Who Sleep on Brambles
- The Songs of Robert Burns 1988 (co-author)
- Synthesizing: An elective course in composition
- English 12 [rhetoric] Ginn & Co.
- "The Japs Look at the Yanks," in The Atlantic Monthly,
- "A Modern Language for Japan" in The Atlantic Monthly,
- "Report on Japan (1956)" in The Atlantic Monthly,
- "These were My Japanese Students" in The Atlantic Monthly,
- "Report on Japan (1960)" in The Atlantic Monthly,
- Modern Short Fiction of India and Pakistan
