= On Writing Science Fiction (The Editors Strike Back!) =

On Writing Science Fiction (The Editors Strike Back!) is a 1981 book written by George H. Scithers, Darrell Schweitzer, and John M. Ford, and published by Owlswick Press.

== Contents ==
On Writing Science Fiction (The Editors Strike Back!) is a book in which a practical guide is aimed at aspiring science fiction writers and curious readers alike. Drawing on their editorial experience at Isaac Asimov's Science Fiction Magazine, the authors offer clear, accessible advice on how to transform story ideas into publishable fiction. The book spans eleven chapters, each tackling essential elements of storytelling—conflict, character, plot, background, science, tragedy, and humor—with illustrative short stories that reinforce the lessons and include commentary from the writers themselves. Rather than focusing on technical mechanics like grammar or punctuation, the book assumes a baseline of writing competence and concentrates on what to do with those skills. It emphasizes perseverance and submission, encouraging writers to keep their work circulating until it finds a home. Memorable maxims, such as Scithers' reminder that editors reject paper, not people, and Heinlein's famous Five Rules of Writing, underscore the motivational tone. The appendices offering practical resources like manuscript formatting guidelines, rights information, and annotated bibliographies for further reading.

== Reception ==
Lee Michaels reviewed On Writing Science Fiction (The Editors Strike Back!) for Pegasus magazine and stated that "If you aspire to be a science fiction writer, if you are writing and wish to improve your rate of sales, or if you simply want to see how it should be done, this is one of the best available guides to writing for this particular, peculiar genre."

== Reviews ==
- Review by Michaela Roessner [as by Mikey Roessner-Herman] (1981) in Locus, #244 May 1981
- Review by Tom Staicar (1982) in Amazing Science Fiction Stories, January 1982
- Review by Thomas A. Easton [as by Tom Easton] (1982) in Analog Science Fiction/Science Fact, February 1, 1982
- Review by Joe de Bolt (1982) in Science Fiction & Fantasy Book Review, #3, April 1982
- Review by Barry N. Malzberg (1982) in The Magazine of Fantasy & Science Fiction, June 1982
- Review by T. E. D. Klein (1982) in Rod Serling's The Twilight Zone Magazine, August 1982
