= Mills Cross Telescope =

Radio telescope in New South Wales, Australia

Coordinates: 33°51′40″S 150°46′30″E

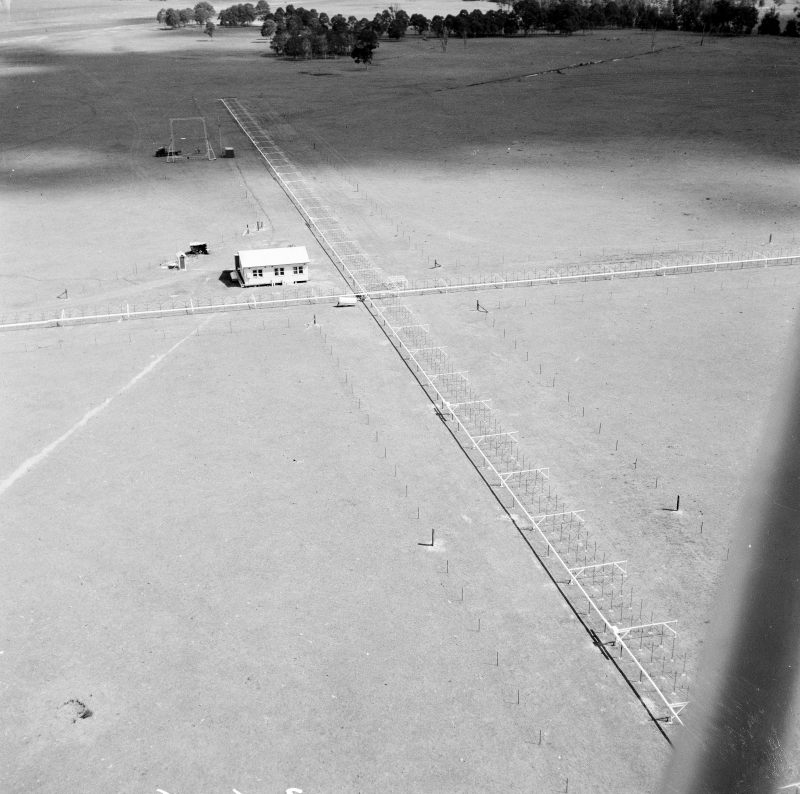
The Mills Cross at Fleurs, looking S along part of the N-S arm, with the receiver house conspicuous at the centre of the array. A fence around the array kept the animals out.

The Mills Cross Telescope was a two-dimensional radio telescope built by Bernard Mills in 1954 at the Fleurs field station of the Australian Commonwealth Scientific and Industrial Research Organisation in the area known now as Badgerys Creek, about 40 km west of Sydney, New South Wales, Australia.

Each arm of the cross was 1500 feet (450 m) long, running N–S and E–W, and produced a fan beam in the sky. Mills said it "consists of two rows of 250 half-wave dipole elements backed by a plane wire mesh reflector; the individual dipoles are aligned in an E-W direction." The cross operated at a frequency of 85.5 MHz (3.5m wavelength), giving a 49 arcminute beam.

When the voltages of the two arms were multiplied a pencil beam was formed, but with rather high sidelobes. The beam could be steered in the sky by adjusting the phasing of the elements in each arm.

== Science ==
Between 1954 and 1957, Bernard Mills, Eric R. Hill and O. Bruce Slee, using the Mills Cross, carried out a detailed survey of the sky and recorded over 2,000 sources of discrete radio emission, publishing results in a series of research papers in the Australian Journal of Physics. The differences between these sources and the Cambridge 2C survey were a cause of scientific disquiet until serious questions about the 2C survey results were resolved several years later.

In 1963, the Fleurs site was transferred to the School of Electrical Engineering at the University of Sydney. The observatory was effectively closed in 1991. The 18 m dish antenna installed at Fleurs in 1959 was transferred to the Parkes Observatory.

Two of the old 13.7m dish antennas were relocated from the University of Sydney site to the CSIRO at Marsfield in 2005, as part of a precursor study into the Square Kilometer Array (SKA) development.

Until 1961, astronomers Mills, Slee, and Hill published their Catalogue of Radio Sources (later known as the MSH Catalogue after their surnames), in which some 2,300 of discrete radio emissions were introduced.

=== Other cross telescopes ===
Fleurs was also the site of:

- the Shain Cross Telescope, 1956 named after Alex Shain, solar observatory
  - 19.7 MHz, beam width of 1.4 degrees, N–S and E-W arms of 1105 m and 1036 m respectively
- the Chris Cross Telescope, 1957 named after Dr. Wilbur Norman Christiansen, solar observatory
  - N–S and E-W arms each 378m containing 32 parabolic dishes 5.8m in diameter
  - in 1959, an 18m parabola was installed at the eastern end of the Chris Cross, moved in 1963 to the Parkes Observatory
  - then, six 13.7m stand-alone antennas were sited at and beyond the ends of the N–S and E–W solar arrays, which comprised the Fleurs Synthesis Telescope with a resolving power of 20 arc seconds, used in the 1970s and until its closure in 1988 studying individual radio sources but particularly large radio galaxies, supernova remnants and emission nebulae.

Following the success of this design, Mills built another large cross antenna, the Molonglo Cross Telescope, near Canberra.

Other large cross-type radio telescopes were later built in the United States, Italy, Russia, and Ukraine.

== See also ==
- Lists of telescopes

== Sources ==
- "A new southern hemisphere synthesis radio telescope", Christiansen, W.N. Proceedings of the IEEE, Volume 61, Issue 9, September 1973 Page(s): 1266 – 1270
- "A Catalogue of Radio Sources between Declinations +10° and −20°", Mills, B. Y.; Slee, O. B.; Hill, E. R. Australian Journal of Physics, Volume 11, Issue 3, September 1958, Page(s): 360 – 387, ADS:1958AuJPh..11..360M
- "A Catalogue of Radio Sources between Declinations −20° and −50°", Mills, B. Y.; Slee, O. B.; Hill, E. R. Australian Journal of Physics, Volume 13, December 1960, Page(s): 676, ADS:1960AuJPh..13..676M
- "A Catalogue of Radio Sources between Declinations −50° and −80°", Mills, B. Y.; Slee, O. B.; Hill, E. R. Australian Journal of Physics, Volume 14, December 1961, Page(s): 497, ADS:1961AuJPh..14..497M
