= Science Digest =

American magazine (1937–1988)

- Cover of the November 1955 issue of Science Digest in its original digest-sized format.
- Categories: science magazine
- Frequency: Monthly
- Founded: 1937
- First issue: January 1937
- Final issue: 1988
- Company: Hearst Magazines
- Country: USA
- Based in: Des Moines, Iowa
- Language: English
- ISSN: 0036-8296

Science Digest was an American popular science magazine published by the Hearst Corporation from 1937 through 1988. Issued monthly until 1980, the content was fact-based science with investigative journalism written for a non-scientific audience. In the 1980s, the magazine changed to a bimonthly format and included more sensational headlines and pseudoscience. It ceased publication after a decline an advertising sales and a subsequent sale to Time, Inc. which owned its more modern competitors Discover and Omni.

== History ==
Science Digest was first published in January 1937 in an 8 × 5 inch digest size format of about 100 pages. First edited by G.W. Stamm, it was targeted at persons with a high school education level. It contained short articles about general science often excerpted from other publications in the style of Reader's Digest. The headquarters of Science Digest was in Des Moines, Iowa.

In November 1980 the magazine was expanded to an 11 × 8 inch glossy page format with full-length articles and color pictures targeted at a college-educated reader. The new version was largely the creation of its then editor Scott DeGarmo. It was issued bi-monthly with circulation of about 500,000 copies. At first it tended to favor breathless cover lines, and often turned to pseudoscience topics, including spontaneous human combustion and UFOs. Unable to compete with more serious publications, such as Discover and Omni, the magazine ceased publication in 1986.

The magazine briefly re-appeared as a quarterly in 1987, returning to the original small "digest" format, with many short articles and snippets of science information. This final relaunch lasted only one year.

== Omega Science Digest ==
An Australian edition under the title Omega Science Digest began in January 1981 and had a circulation of 40,000. Omega, unlike its American counterpart, carried two original fiction stories per issue. Omega stopped publication in 1986 after the cessation of the parent publication.

== Notable staff and writers ==
- Isaac Asimov
- Daniel E. Button
- Rachel Carson
- Arthur C. Clarke
- Daniel Cohen
- Hugh Downs
- Timothy Ferris
- Kenneth Franklin
- Jeffrey Kluger
- Fritz Leiber
- Ashley Montagu
- Andrew Revkin
- Frank M. Robinson
