= Tales from Gavagan's Bar =

Book by L. Sprague de Camp and Fletcher Pratt

- Dust-jacket for Tales from Gavagan's Bar
- Author: L. Sprague de Camp and Fletcher Pratt
- Illustrator: Inga Pratt
- Cover artist: Inga Pratt
- Language: English
- Genre: Fantasy
- Publisher: Twayne Publishers
- Publication date: 1953
- Publication place: United States
- Media type: Print (hardback)
- Pages: 228 pp

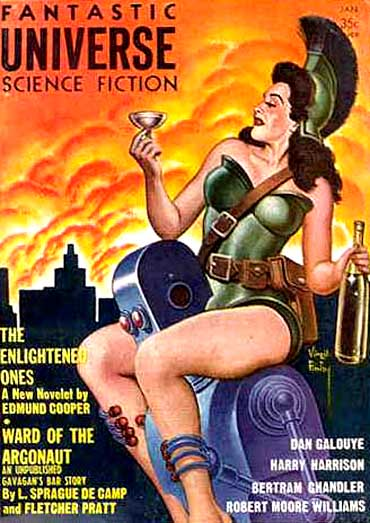
The "Gavagan's Bar" story "Ward of the Argonaut" was featured on the cover of the January 1959 issue of Fantastic Universe.

Tales from Gavagan's Bar is a collection of fantasy short stories by American writers L. Sprague de Camp and Fletcher Pratt, illustrated by the latter's wife Inga Pratt. It was first published in hardcover by Twayne Publishers in 1953; an expanded edition rearranging the contents and adding pieces not in the first was published in hardcover by Owlswick Press in June 1978. The original illustrations were retained in this edition. It was subsequently issued in paperback (without the illustrations) by Bantam Books in January 1980. An e-book edition was published by Gollancz's SF Gateway imprint on September 29, 2011, as part of a general release of de Camp's works in electronic form. The collection has also been published in German.

Most of the pieces were originally published between 1950 and 1954, twelve in The Magazine of Fantasy & Science Fiction, three in Weird Tales, and eleven in the first edition of the collection; two additional tales subsequently appeared in Fantastic Universe in 1959, and one more, together with a new afterword, in the expanded edition of the collection in 1978.

The Gavagan's Bar stories fall into the genre of barroom tall tales, though in this instance most of the tall tales turn out to be true, or at least possibly true. The authors patterned them after Lord Dunsany's Jorkens stories.

== Contents ==
Original edition (1953)	Revised edition (1978)
1. Preface (1st appearance)	1. Preface
2. "The Gift of God" (MF&SF Win./Spr. 1950)	7. "The Gift of God"
3. "Corpus Delectable" (1st appearance)	14. "Corpus Delectable"
4. "The Better Mousetrap" (MF&SF Dec. 1950)	8. "The Better Mousetrap"
5. "Elephas Frumenti" (MF&SF Win./Spr. 1950)	2. "Elephas Frumenti"
6. "Beasts of Bourbon" (MF&SF Oct. 1951)	6. "Beasts of Bourbon"
7. "The Love Nest" (1st appearance)	12. "The Love Nest"
8. "The Stone of the Sages" (1st appearance)	13. "The Stone of the Sages"
9. "Where to, Please?" (WT Sep. 1952)	16. "Where to, Please?"
10. "The Palimpsest of St. Augustine" (1st appearance)	15. "The Palimpsest of St. Augustine"
11. "More Than Skin Deep" (MF&SF Apr. 1951)	5. "More Than Skin Deep"
12. "No Forwarding Address" (1st appearance)	9. "No Forwarding Address"
	10. "The Untimely Toper" (MF&SF Jul. 1953)
13. "When the Night Wind Howls" (WT Nov. 1951)	17. "Methought I Heard a Voice" (retitled from "When the Night Wind Howls")
	18. "One Man's Meat" (MF&SF Sep. 1953)
14. "My Brother's Keeper" (1st appearance)	19. "My Brother's Keeper"
15. "A Dime Brings You Success" (1st appearance)	20. "A Dime Brings You Success"
	21. "Oh, Say! Can You See?" (FU Jan. 1959 as "Ward of the Argonaut")
16. "The Rape of the Lock" (MF&SF Feb. 1952)	22. "The Rape of the Lock"
	23. "Bell, Book, and Candle" (FU Oct. 1959)
17. "All That Glitters" (1st appearance)	24. "All That Glitters"
18. "Here, Putzi!" (1st appearance)	4. "Here, Putzi!"
19. "Gin Comes in Bottles" (1st appearance)	25. "Gin Comes in Bottles"
	26. "There'd Be Thousands in It" (1st appearance)
20. "The Black Ball" (MF&SF Oct. 1952)	27. "The Black Ball"
21. "The Green Thumb" (MF&SF Feb. 1953)	28. "The Green Thumb"
22. "Caveat Emptor" (WT Mar. 1953)	29. "Caveat Emptor"
	30. "The Weissenbroch Spectacles" (MF&SF Nov. 1954)
23. "The Eve of St. John" (1st appearance)	11. "The Eve of St. John"
24. "The Ancestral Amethyst" (MF&SF Aug. 1952)	3. "The Ancestral Amethyst"
	31. "By and About" (afterword) (1st appearance)

== Continuations ==
According to de Camp, he and Pratt envisioned at least one more Gavagan's Bar story, about a vampire with a sweet tooth, which was never written due to Pratt's early death.

While L. Sprague de Camp never continued the series on his own, an additional Gavagan's Bar story authored by Michael F. Flynn, "The Ensorcelled ATM", appeared in Harry Turtledove's 2005 tribute anthology honoring de Camp, The Enchanter Completed. It ties the series in with de Camp's later W. Wilson Newbury stories.

== Critical reception ==
Reviewing the original edition for Galaxy, Groff Conklin described the stories as "completely enchanting—wise, mad, fantastic, funny, warmly human and often very moving." P. Schuyler Miller compared the stories to Lord Dunsany's "Jorkens" tales.
