= Alien Planet (novel) =

1962 novel by Fletcher Pratt

- First edition
- Author: Fletcher Pratt
- Cover artist: Ed Emshwiller
- Language: English
- Genre: Science fiction
- Publisher: Avalon Books
- Publication date: 1962
- Publication place: United States
- Media type: Print (hardcover)
- Pages: 224 pp

Alien Planet is a science fiction novel by Fletcher Pratt. It was first published in hardcover by Avalon Books in 1962; a paperback edition followed from Ace Books in 1963 and was reprinted in 1973. The book is an expansion of "A Voice Across the Years," a novella Pratt co-authored with "I. M. Stephens" (his wife, Inga Stephens Pratt), originally published in the magazine Amazing Stories Quarterly in the issue for Winter 1932.

== History ==
Alien Planet is uncharacteristic of science fiction of the 1930s, which tended more towards space opera (in the sense the term began to be used in the 1970s). Written in a careful, reportorial style, it purports to be an account of one of two friends inadvertently transported to another world with the occupant of a disabled alien craft they aid in repairing his "sky car" (Shoraru) while on a mountain hike. The matter-of-fact present day account thus achieved a remarkable realism.

== Plot ==
Merrick Wells and Alvin Schierstedt meet a man-like alien (Ashembe) from Murashema. He demonstrates genius by quickly learning English from a copy of Shakespeare's Merchant of Venice. In the course of assisting Ashembe with repairs to his Shoraru, which Ashembe translates as "Sky Car", one of the men is trapped inside and makes the return flight to Murashema. Faced with the choice of working for a living or performing as an artist to pay for his keep, Merrick performs popular English poems in dramatic rhythm. He is lauded by the aliens for this new art form, but Merrick learns he will be castigated and punished if it is discovered these poems are not original. He luckily makes his escape before his misunderstanding of alien customs casts him into peril; and he learns that even a seemingly utopian government must inevitably have flaws.
