= McKee-Beshers Wildlife Management Area =

Protected area in Maryland, United States

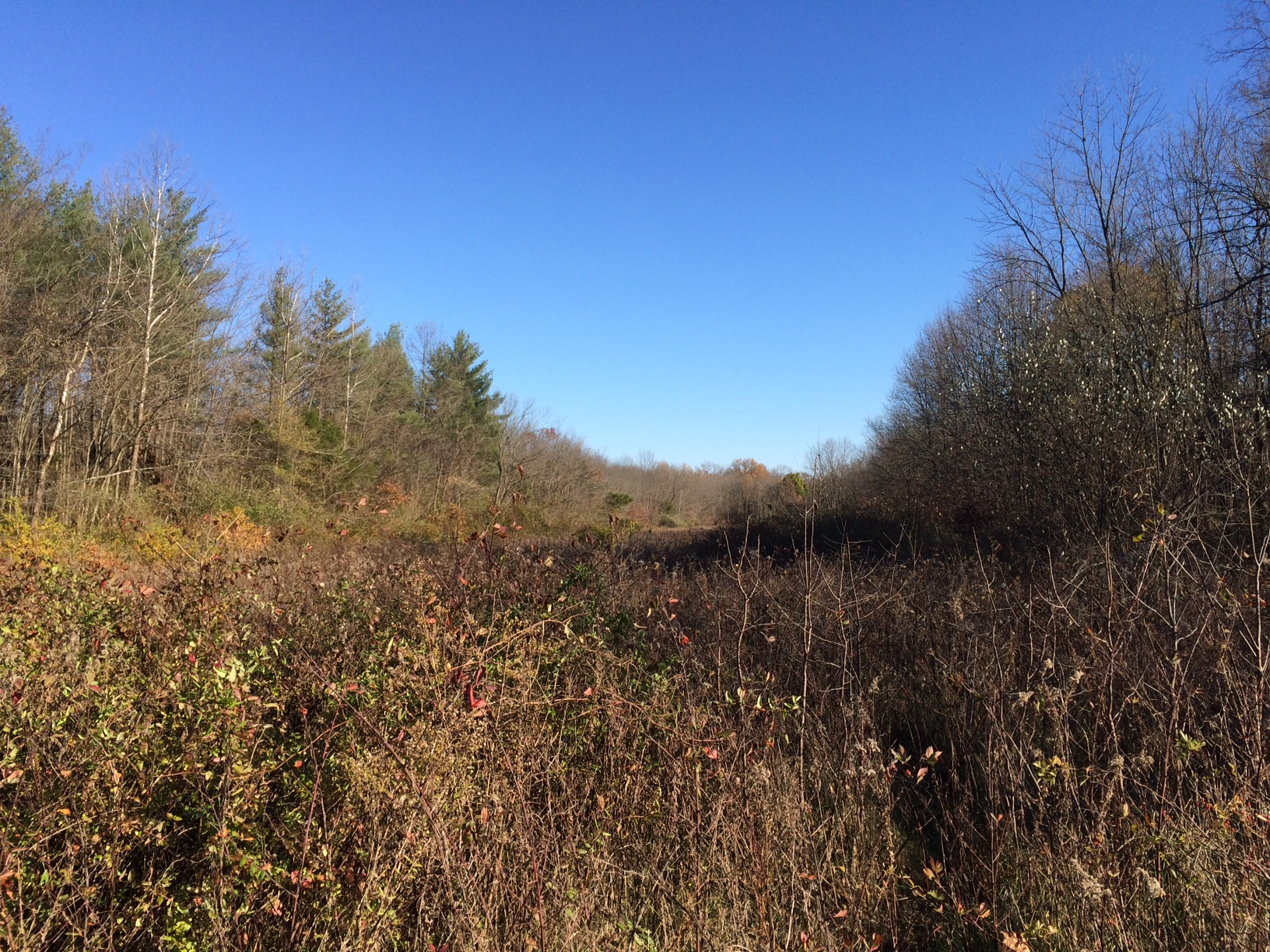
- McKee-Beshers Open Field, Autumn
- Interactive map of McKee-Beshers Wildlife Management Area
- Location: Montgomery County, Maryland, U.S.
- Coordinates: 39°04′15″N 77°23′29″W
- Area: 2,000 acres (8.09 km^{2})
- Governing body: Maryland Department of Natural Resources

McKee-Beshers Wildlife Management Area is a Wildlife Management Area in Montgomery County, Maryland. It is a large contiguous forest of varied habitat, situated between the Potomac River and the Chesapeake & Ohio Canal to the south, and Seneca Creek State Park to the east.

Acres of sunflowers are planted each year at McKee-Beshers WMA to attract game birds. Every July, these spectacular fields in full bloom also draw photographers, garden enthusiasts, and tourists.

In the 1950s this was the site of the Mills Cross Array, an early radio telescope operated by the Carnegie Institution of Washington which was the first instrument to detect radio waves from another planet (Jupiter).
