= Gilbert Cant =

London-born American journalist

- Born: September 16, 1909; London, England
- Died: August 1, 1982 (aged 72)
- Occupation: Journalist

Gilbert Cant (September 16, 1909 – August 1, 1982) was a London-born American journalist.

Cant arrived in the U.S. in 1934 and began working for the New York Post in 1937. He was a war correspondent in the Pacific during World War II and wrote three books on the subject, The War at Sea, America's Navy in World War II, and The Great Pacific Victory. He joined Time in 1943 and was their medical editor from 1949 to 1969.

Cant was a member of the all-male literary banqueting club the Trap Door Spiders, which served as the basis of Isaac Asimov's fictional group of mystery solvers the Black Widowers. Cant himself was the model for the Thomas Trumbull character. After Cant died, Asimov dedicated the collection Banquets of the Black Widowers (1984) to his memory and to that of Frederic Dannay.

In an essay in the September 4, 1972 issue of Time, Cant famously wrote of Reuben Fine, "When Fine switched his major interest from chess to psychoanalysis, the result was a loss for chess—and a draw, at best, for psychoanalysis."

== Bibliography ==
- The War at Sea (1942)
- America's Navy in World War II (1943)
- This Is the Navy (1944), editor
- War on Japan (1945)
- The Great Pacific Victory from the Solomons to Tokyo (1946)
- Medical Research May Save Your Life! (1954)
- New Medicines for the Mind: Their Meaning and Promise (1955)
- Male Trouble: A New Focus on the Prostate (1976), ISBN 0-275-56370-7
