= Kenneth Franklin =

American astronomer, educator (1923–2007)

Kenneth L. Franklin
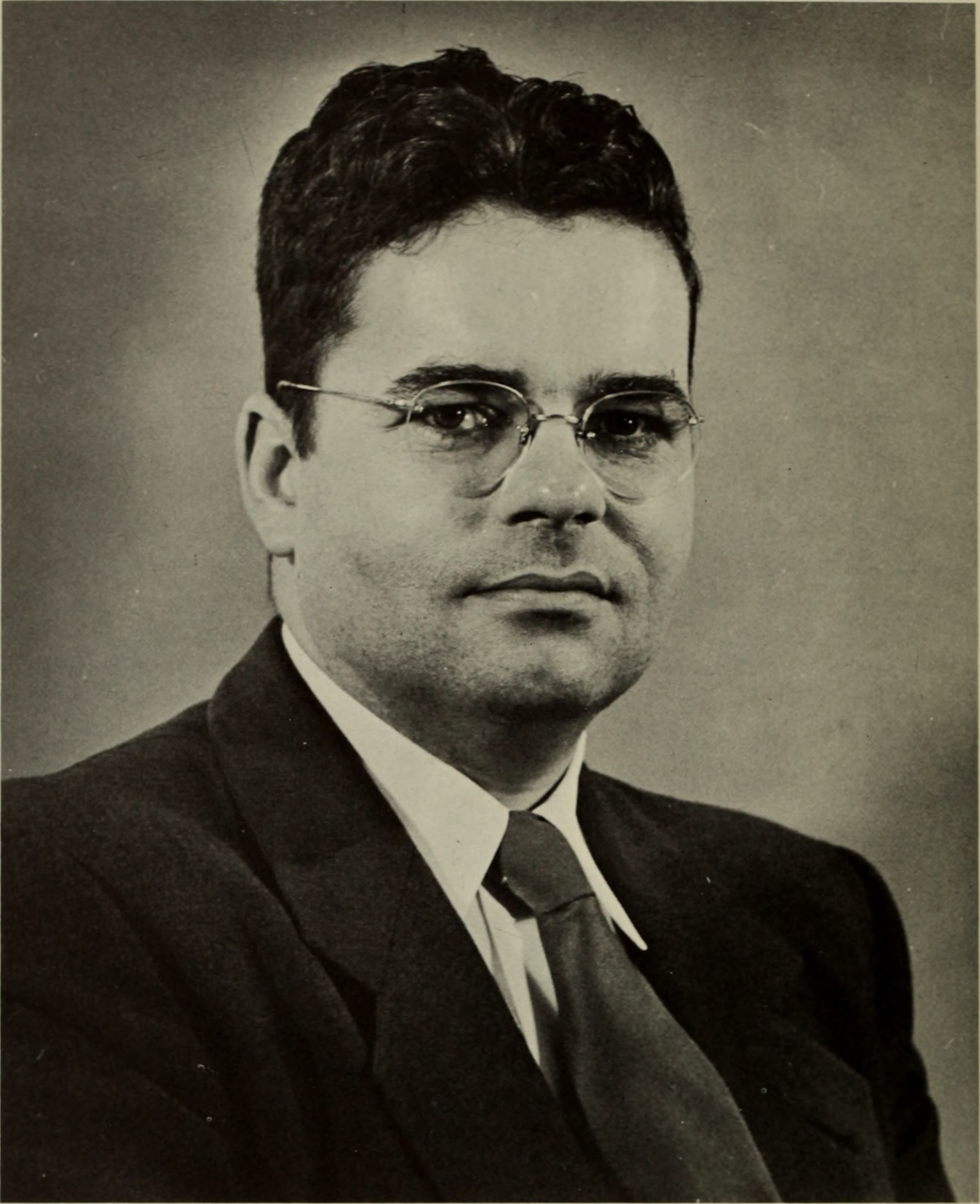
- Franklin in the 1960s
- Born: March 25, 1923; Alameda, California
- Died: June 18, 2007 (aged 84); Boulder, Colorado
- Education: University of California, Berkeley
- Known for: Hayden Planetarium, Jupiter
- Scientific career
- Fields: astronomy
- Thesis: A spectrophotometric investigation of Capella (1953)

Kenneth Linn Franklin (March 25, 1923 – June 18, 2007) was an American astronomer and educator. Franklin was the chief scientist at the Hayden Planetarium from 1956 to 1984 and was co-credited with discovering radio waves originating on Jupiter, the first detection of signals from another planet. He was often a local and national media figure including during Apollo 11, the first human mission to the moon, when Franklin was an on-camera astronomy expert for NBC.

== Early life and discovery ==
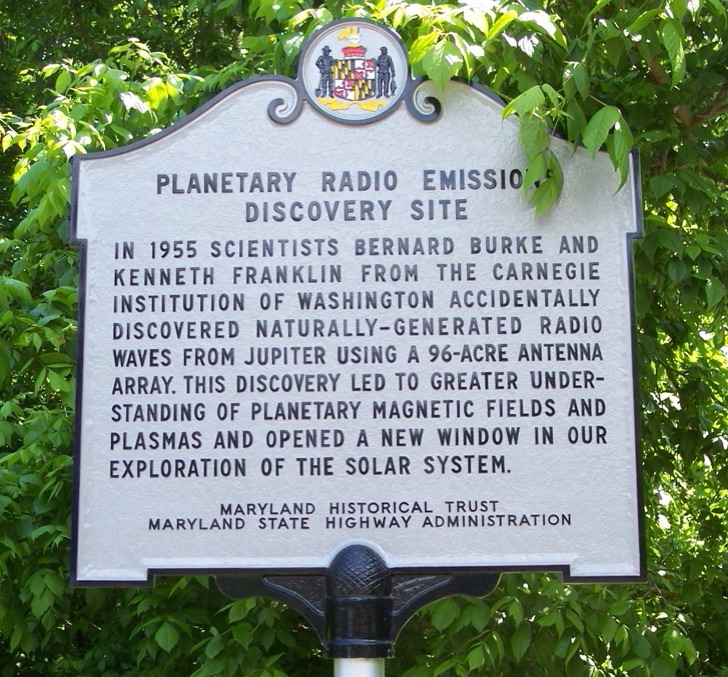
Maryland historic marker of radio telescope site

Franklin was born in Alameda, California to Myles Arthur and Ruth Linn (Houston) Franklin. He received an A.A. degree from the University of California, Berkeley in 1944 and bachelor's degree in 1948. He married Beverly Mattson on November 29, 1949. He earned a Ph.D. from Berkeley in 1953 and a research fellowship at the Department of Terrestrial Magnetism at the Carnegie Institution of Washington from 1954 to 1956. In 1955, Franklin and Dr. Bernard F. Burke were scanning for space signals when they heard a hissing noise. Originally thinking the noise was a passing vehicle's spark plug, they soon traced it to Jupiter, the first noise ever traced to a specific planet. They presented their findings to the American Astronomical Society on April 6, 1955. In March 1956, Franklin's wife, with whom he had two daughters, died. Franklin began working at the Hayden Planetarium the same year. On May 18, 1958, he married Charlotte Walton, who worked at Carnagie in the terrestrial magnetism dept., and later legally adopted a daughter from her previous marriage. He also specialized in solar eclipses.

== Career ==
After the notable discovery of 1955, Franklin was frequently invited as an astronomical expert on television and radio. He appeared on a CBS Sputnik special in 1957, appeared on CBS for the landing of Surveyor 1 in 1966, and was on NBC for Apollo 8, Apollo 10, and Apollo 11 in 1968 and 1969. He became the astronomy editor for the World Almanac from 1968 to 1996 and was on the editorial panel of Science Digest from 1970 to 1985. From 1973 to 1979, Franklin was the Public Affairs Officer for the American Astronomical Society. He taught at several universities and colleges on the American east coast including New York University, City University of New York, and Cooper Union. He also lectured at Columbia School of Journalism and the United States Military Academy and was an adjunct professor at Rutgers University for three and a half years. Franklin was part of a visiting lecturer program and in 1973 and 1980, he led tours to Africa to observe solar eclipses. Franklin contributed almanac information including the time of sunrise to The New York Times from 1975 to 1997. He also contributed all of the astronomical calculations for the Farmers' Almanac from 1980 to 1992. These were in addition to his regular duties presenting popular planetarium shows from 1956 to 1984 and producing his own radio program.

An asteroid discovered by Edward L. G. Bowell in 1981 was named 2845 Franklinken in Franklin's honor.

Franklin lived in Loveland, Colorado until his death in Boulder from heart surgery complications. He was survived by his wife, three daughters, six grandchildren, and six great-grandchildren.

He was a member of the all-male literary banqueting club the Trap Door Spiders, which served as the basis of Isaac Asimov's fictional group of mystery solvers the Black Widowers. He was a lifelong friend of Asimov's, & they took several ocean solar eclipse cruises together. After he retired, he & his wife, Charlotte, whom he met at Carnegie where she also worked, traveled the Americas via Airstream.
