= William Thomas Quick =

American novelist

- Born: May 1946; Muncie, Indiana, U.S.
- Occupation: Novelist
- Writing career
- Genre: Science fiction
- Website: www.iw3p.com/quick.shtml

William Thomas "Bill" Quick (born May 1946), who sometimes writes under the pseudonym Margaret Allan, is a science fiction author and self-described libertarian conservative blogger. Quick is the author of 28 novels, the most famous of which is the cyberpunk Dreams of Flesh and Sand, and co-authored a six-novel series with William Shatner. He runs the conservative blog Daily Pundit.

Originally from Indiana, he lives in Hunters Point, San Francisco, California.

== Books ==
Quick is the author of 28 novels, the most famous of which is Dreams of Flesh and Sand. He co-authored the six novel Quest for Tomorrow series with William Shatner. He has also written a series of prehistoric adventure novels under the pen name Margaret Allan, the best selling of which was The Last Mammoth.

His 2014 novel, Lightning Fall, a disaster thriller, was featured in a USA Today column by Instapundit's Glenn Reynolds. Quick's novel and Reynold's column were commented on by other libertarian sources.

== Blog "Daily Pundit" ==
Quick started blogging at Daily Pundit in 2001. It continues as a group blog. The word "blogosphere" is credited by some to Quick, who proposed it on Daily Pundit in 2001.

== American Conservative Party ==
In February 2008, Quick was among those involved (he describes himself as "the guy who dreamed up the damned name of the party, registered it, built your first web site, and gave you your first publicity") in the creation of a third party called the American Conservative Party as an alternative to the Democratic and Republican parties. He has since repudiated this organization repeatedly on his blog.

== See also ==
- Warblog
