= Inga Stephens Pratt Clark =

American artist and book illustrator

Inga Marie Stephens Pratt Clark
- Born: Inga Marie Stephens; December 8, 1906; Brookings, South Dakota
- Died: 1970
- Education: Académie Colarossi, Art Students League of New York
- Known for: Illustration

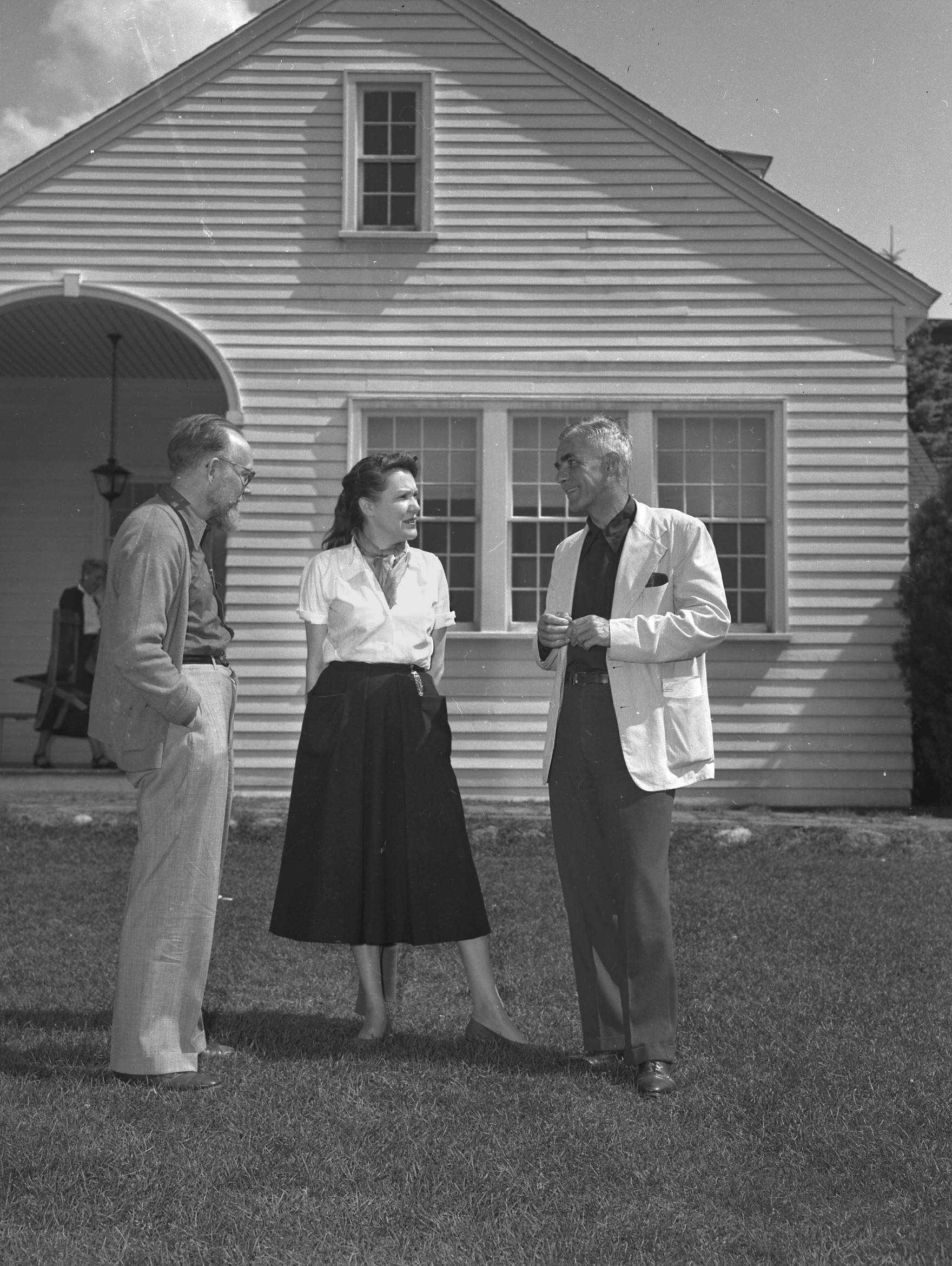
Inga Pratt with her husband, and the director Theodore Morrison, at the Bread Loaf Writers' Conference in 1950

Inga Marie Pratt Clark (née Stephens; December 8, 1906 – 1970) was an American artist and book illustrator, who, with her husband Fletcher Pratt, was at the center of a circle of New York literary figures during the 20th century.

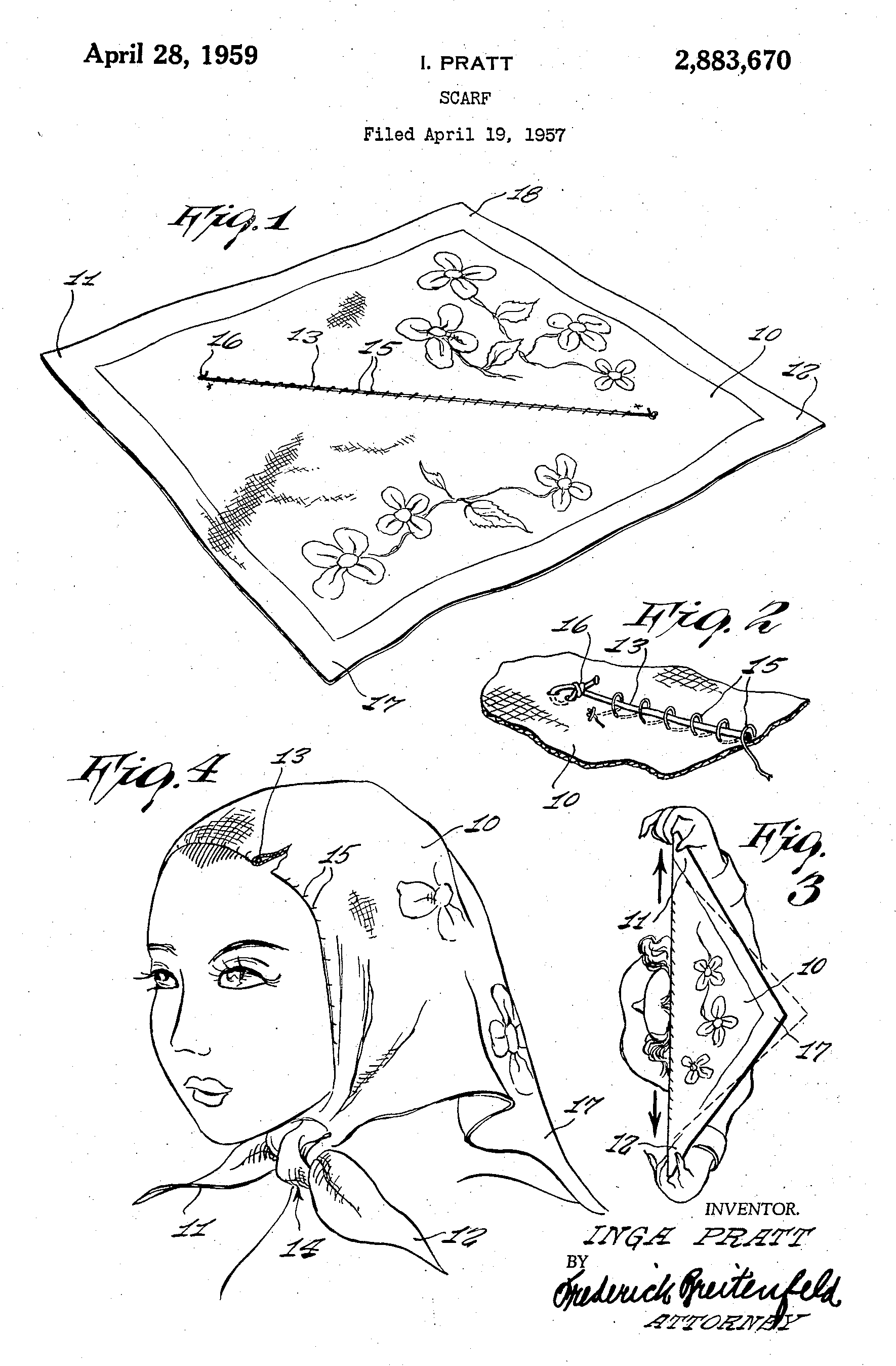
Patent drawing by Inga Stephens Pratt (1906–1970) for U.S. patent 2883670, depicting her invention, a scarf.

== Life and work ==
Stephens was born on December 8, 1906, in Brookings, South Dakota. She studied art at the Académie Colarossi in Paris and at the Art Students League of New York. On July 1, 1926, she married Fletcher Pratt, a prolific American author. They lived in New York City. She illustrated several of Pratt's books, including Tales from Gavagan's Bar, Empire and the Sea, The Empire and the Glory, and A Man and His Meals. She also collaborated with him on at least two stories, and served as his literary executor.

Under the names of "Inga Stephens", "Inga", and later "Inga Pratt", she was a freelance commercial artist, specializing in fashion. She collaborated with Tedi Berri on a textbook, Fashion Drawing. Kay Hardy wrote: "Such artists as... Inga Pratt, of Bloomingdale's, have a style of work as definite as individual handwriting and no more to be imitated than the signature on a check." She also collaborated in writing a couple of science fiction stories with her husband, for which she used the name I. M. Stephens. She invented an improved scarf, for which she obtained a patent in 1959.

Of Inga, Fletcher Pratt wrote: "She is a South Dakota Norwegian, brought up in Montana, where she learned to ride a horse before she was seven, and where she had a collection of pets, which included four eagles, one coyote, one bull-snake, and fourteen cats. She eats a very light breakfast. Her fashion drawings appear in the New York papers almost daily and in various magazines. She finds bridge a waste of time but has illustrated several books. She occasionally plays a recorder, knows how to drive a car, and spends weekends in the country."

In the early 1950s the Pratts hosted meetings of the Hydra Club, a social group of New York science fiction writers, in their Manhattan apartment at 32 West 58th Street. Hydra Club members included Frederik Pohl, Lester del Rey, David A. Kyle, Judith Merril, Martin Greenberg, Robert W. Lowndes, Philip Klass, Willy Ley, George O. Smith, Sam Merwin, and Harry Harrison.

Later the Pratts purchased a sprawling home in Highlands, New Jersey, with over thirty rooms, nicknaming it the Ipsy-Wipsy Institute. It too became a gathering place for their literary friends. Their guests included the Hydra Club members already mentioned, other science fiction and fantasy writers such as L. Sprague de Camp, Theodore Sturgeon, Isaac Asimov, and Laurence Manning, and notable mainstream authors and editors such as John Ciardi, Basil Davenport, Bernard DeVoto, and Eugenie Clark.

After Fletcher Pratt's death Inga married the chemist and author John Drury Clark in 1962. (At Clark's wedding to his first wife, in 1943, Inga had served as matron of honor.) Clark dedicated his book Ignition! to her, writing: "This book is dedicated to my wife Inga, who heckled me into writing it with such wifely remarks as, 'You talk a hell of a fine history. Now set yourself down in front of the typewriter — and write the damned thing!'"

== Bibliography ==
=== Illustration ===
- Empire and the Sea, by Fletcher Pratt (1946)
- A Man and His Meals, by Fletcher Pratt (1947)
- The Empire and the Glory; Napoleon Bonaparte: 1800-1806, by Fletcher Pratt (1948)
- Tales from Gavagan's Bar, a collection of stories by Fletcher Pratt and L. Sprague de Camp (1953, expanded 1978)

=== Textbooks ===
- Fashion Drawing, with Fashion Drawings and Sketches by Inga Stephens, with Tedi Berri (Bridgman Publishers, Inc., 1936)

=== Stories as author ===
- "The Pineal Stimulator", as I. M. Stephens, with Fletcher Pratt (Amazing Stories, November 1930)
- "A Voice Across the Years", as I. M. Stephens, with Fletcher Pratt (Amazing Stories Quarterly, Winter 1932)
