= Molonglo Observatory Synthesis Telescope =

Radio telescope

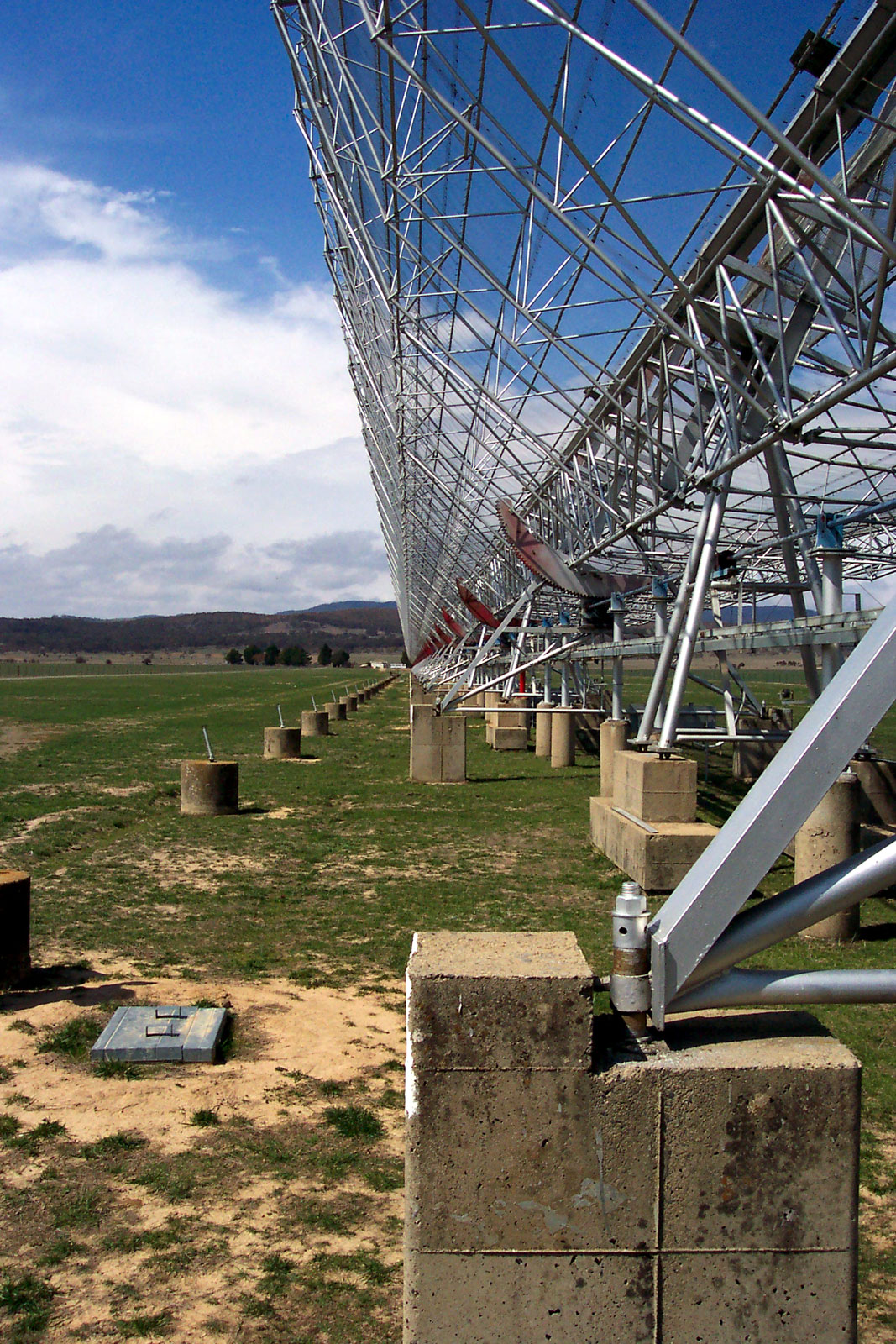
- Molonglo Observatory Synthesis Telescope
- Location: New South Wales, AUS
- Coordinates: 35°22′15″S 149°25′26″E
- Wavelength: 843 MHz (35.6 cm)
- Location within Australia
- Related media on Commons

The Molonglo Observatory Synthesis Telescope (MOST) is a radio telescope operating at 843 MHz. It was operated by the School of Physics of the University of Sydney. The telescope is located in Hoskinstown, near the Molonglo River and Canberra, and was constructed by modification of the east–west arm of the former Molonglo Cross Telescope, a larger version of the Mills Cross Telescope. Construction of the original "Super Cross" telescope with 1.6-kilometre arms began in 1960 by Professor Bernard Y. Mills. It became operational in 1967.

== Design ==
The MOST consists of two cylindrical paraboloids, 778m x 12m, separated by 15m and aligned east–west. A line feed system of 7744 circular dipoles collects the signal and feeds 176 preamplifiers and 88 IF amplifiers.

The telescope is steered by mechanical rotation of the cylindrical paraboloids about their long axis, and by phasing the feed elements along the arms. The feed elements were decommissioned in 2018 so that the telescope began to operate in transit mode only. Prior to this, the `alt-alt' system could follow a field for ± 6 hours (necessary for a complete aperture synthesis with an east–west array) for fields south of declination -30 degrees. For fields near this limit the signal-to-noise ratio is lower for the first and last hour or so due to the lower gain of the system at large 'meridian arc distance' angles.

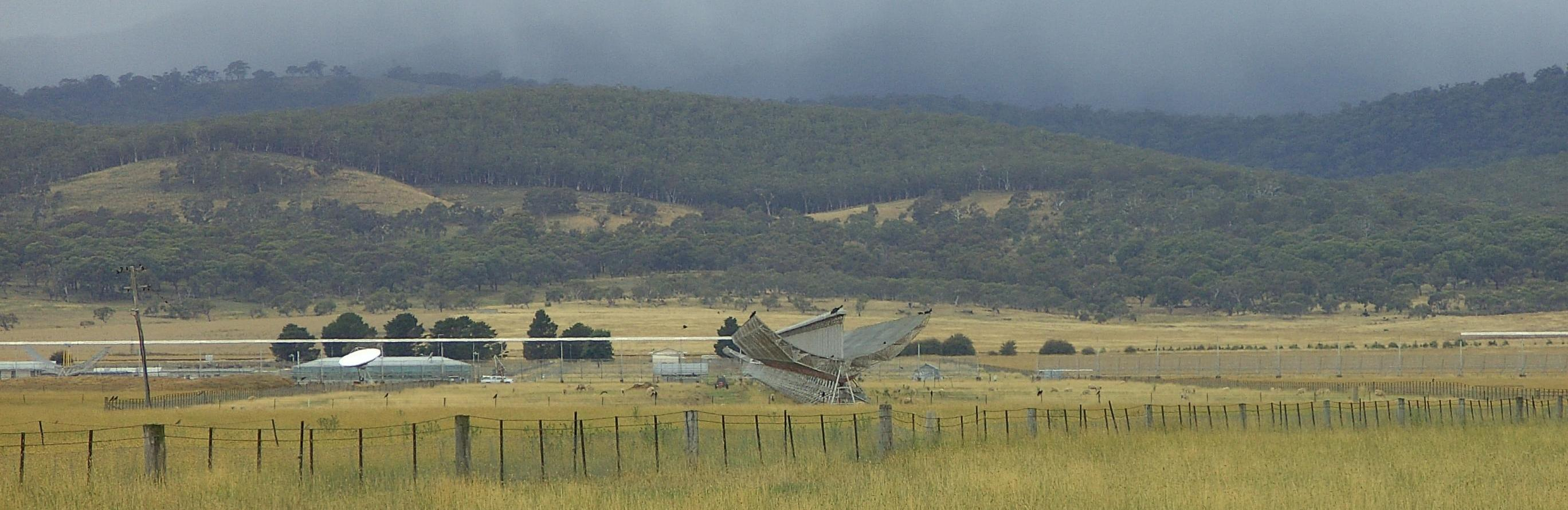
MOST looking along E-W arm from the west.

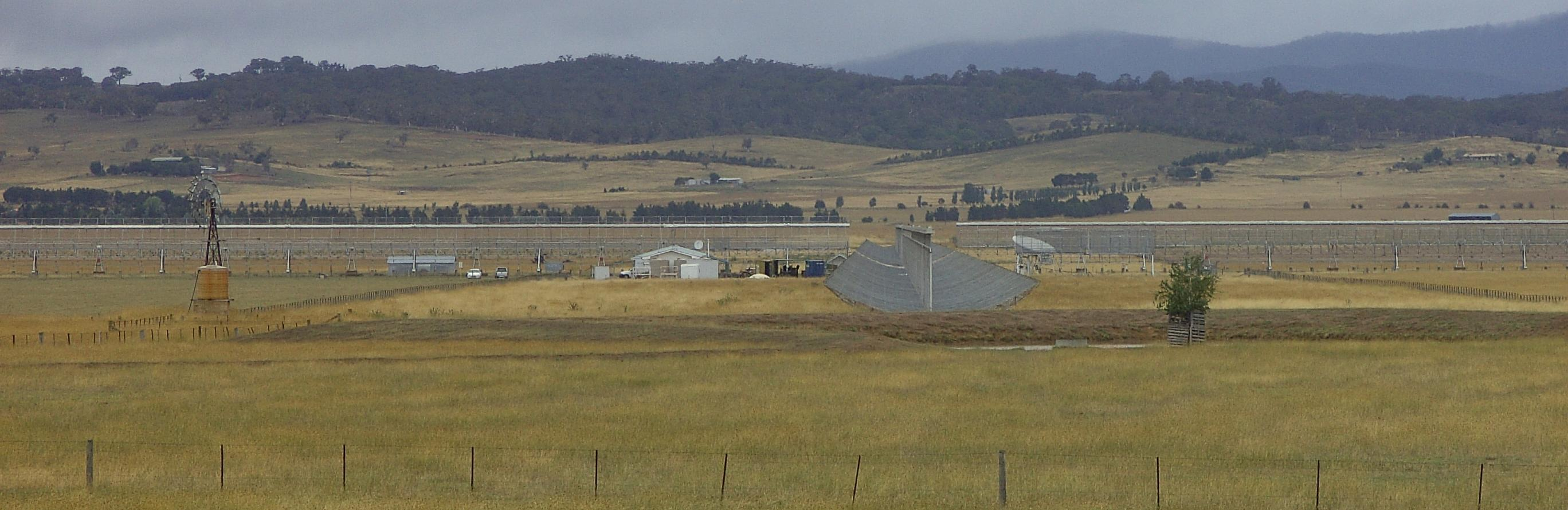
MCT antennas looking along remaining N-S arm from the north.

The Molonglo Cross Telescope was a 408 MHz radio telescope built by Bernard Y. Mills and collaborators and operated by the University of Sydney. It telescope consisted of a north–south arm and an east–west arm in a cross shape. Each arm was approximately one mile in length. The east–west arm was split into 88 individual elements to form the current Molonglo Observatory Synthesis Telescope.

=== Grote Reber ===
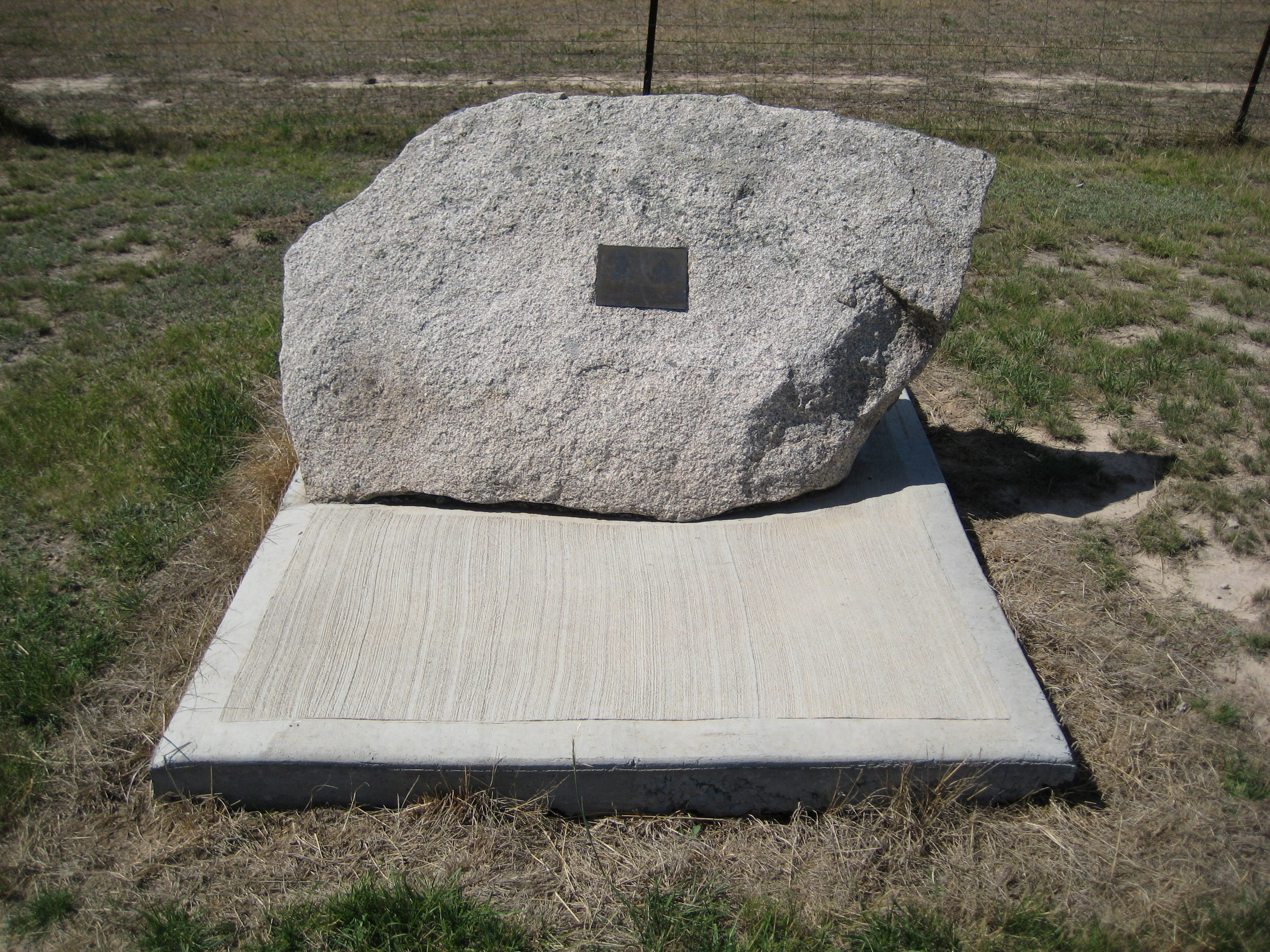
Reber memorial

The design of the original system owes much to pioneering radio astronomy by Grote Reber in the US and Australia, that informed Mills' work. A memorial to Reber, including some of his ashes, is sited at the telescope.

== MOST work ==
Much pioneering radio astronomy was done with this telescope. The Molonglo Cross Telescope was used for a survey of the Southern sky with a resolution of 2.8 arc-min.

The telescope's main research project was the Sydney University Molonglo Sky Survey (SUMSS), a sensitive radio imaging survey of the southern sky at 843 MHz with similar resolution and sensitivity to the northern NRAO VLA Sky Survey (NVSS). SUMSS is now complete, and digital images and a source catalogue are available online.

After a five-year break in which analog equipment was upgraded the observatory is now used to detect fast radio bursts and do research on pulsars. The equipment for fast radio burst detection is called UTMOST.

== Square Kilometre Array development ==
MOST is being used to develop technology for the Australian site of the Square Kilometre Array telescope. Since 2003 work has proceeded on the SKA Molonglo Prototype (SKAMP) which has included fitting new wide-band feeds, low-noise amplifiers, digital filterbanks and correlator, in order to demonstrate 300-1420 MHz continuous frequency coverage and multibeam mode operation.

The new correlator is a 96 input continuum correlator using Field Programmable Gate Array (FPGA) chips.

This effort is a collaboration between the Australia Telescope National Facility (ATNF), the Australian Commonwealth Scientific and Industrial Research Organisation (CSIRO) Information and Communications Technology Centre, and the University of Sydney.

== UTMOST ==
Since 2015, the telescope has been operated in a collaboration between the University of Sydney and Swinburne University of Technology. The goal is to probe the radio transient sky in real time, monitoring pulsars and magnetars, and searching for Fast Radio Bursts. The telescope sensitivity was improved by a refit of receiver technologies on one of its arms (in the east–west direction), and presently (late 2020) the north–south arm is being fitted out with significantly improved receivers as well. This will allow Fast Radio Bursts and similar radio transients to be located on the sky with a few arcseconds of precision, sufficient to identify the host galaxies from which the originate.

== See also ==
- List of astronomical observatories
- Lists of telescopes
