= Black Widowers =

Isaac Asimov mystery story series

The Black Widowers is a fictional men-only dining club created by Isaac Asimov for a series of sixty-six mystery stories that he started writing in 1971. Most of the stories were first published in Ellery Queen's Mystery Magazine, though a few first appeared in Fantasy & Science Fiction, Isaac Asimov's Science Fiction Magazine, and the various book collections into which the stories were eventually gathered.

Asimov wrote "there are few stories I write that I enjoy as much as I enjoy my Black Widowers."

== Synopsis ==
Most of the stories follow the same basic convention: the six club members meet once a month at a private room at the Milano restaurant in Manhattan. (Note: The location has variously been given as Fifth and Thirteenth or as Fifth and Eighteenth.) Each one takes a turn to act as host for the evening and brings along a guest for the occasion. The guest may be a friend, relative or colleague from work (women are not allowed). The meal is served by the incomparable waiter Henry Jackson — almost invariably referred to as simply Henry — whom the regulars look upon with high regard and even consider an actual member. The room includes sketches of the guests drawn by Black Widower Mario Gonzalo and a bookcase with an encyclopaedia that is often consulted.

After the main course, the brandy is served and the host rattles his spoon on his water glass for silence. One of the other Widowers is appointed as "griller" and begins the questioning, most often by asking the guest to "justify his existence". In the course of the subsequent conversation, it always comes out that the guest has a problem, varying from personal issues to problems at work to actual crimes. The club members try to solve the problem, raising various related aspects in the course of the conversation, but are unable to come to a conclusion or resolution. In the end, it is Henry who provides the correct, and usually very simple, answer, obtained from details mentioned in the conversation. Asimov intended them to always follow that pattern.

Asimov uses the stories in order to delve into aspects of science, history, culture and other interests: for example, Goldbach's conjecture in "Sixty Million Trillion Combinations"; Gilbert and Sullivan in "The Year of the Action"; and the origins of the name "Susan" in "The Intrusion".

== Origins ==
The Black Widowers were based on a literary dining club Asimov belonged to known as the Trap Door Spiders. Members of the Widowers were based on real-life Spiders, some of them famous writers in their own right:

- Geoffrey Avalon, a patent attorney (based on L. Sprague de Camp)
- Emmanuel Rubin, a mystery novelist and acquaintance of Isaac Asimov (based on Lester del Rey)
- James Drake, a chemist (based on Dr. John D. Clark)
- Thomas Trumbull, an expert in cryptography for the United States government (based on Gilbert Cant)
- Mario Gonzalo, an artist, who usually draws a portrait of the evening's guest (based on Lin Carter)
- Roger Halsted, a high school mathematics teacher, fond of jokes and limericks (based on Don Bensen)

Club waiter Henry Jackson was not based on a real person, but Asimov explained that he might have been inspired in large part by Wodehouse's immortal character Jeeves. Asimov was a P. G. Wodehouse fan and a member of the Wodehouse Society.

The deceased founder of the club, Ralph Ottur, on whom the plot of the story "To the Barest" turned, was based on the real-life founder of the Trap Door Spiders, Fletcher Pratt.

Some guests were also based on real people. The stage magician The Amazing Larri ("The Cross of Lorraine") was based on James Randi, while the arrogant science writer Mortimer Stellar ("When No Man Pursueth") was based on Asimov himself.

== Books and stories ==
The first five books each contained twelve stories; in each case, nine stories were first published in various magazines while three were first published in the book. As was usual with Asimov's collections, many stories had chatty forewords or afterwords. The sixth book, published posthumously, contained six previously uncollected stories, eleven reprinted from previous collections, and additional material by Charles Ardai, William Brittain and Harlan Ellison.

A few Black Widowers tales have been written by other authors as tributes to Asimov. One is "The Overheard Conversation" by Edward D. Hoch, which appears in the festschrift anthology Foundation's Friends (1989); another is "The Last Story", by Charles Ardai, in The Return of the Black Widowers (2003).

The books and the stories collected in them are:

- Tales of the Black Widowers (1974)
  - "The Acquisitive Chuckle"
  - "Ph as in Phony"
  - "Truth to Tell"
  - "Go, Little Book!"
  - "Early Sunday Morning"
  - "The Obvious Factor"
  - "The Pointing Finger"
  - "Miss What?"
  - "The Lullaby of Broadway"
  - "Yankee Doodle Went to Town"
  - "The Curious Omission"
  - "Out of Sight"
- More Tales of the Black Widowers (1976)
  - "When No Man Pursueth"
  - "Quicker Than the Eye"
  - "The Iron Gem"
  - "The Three Numbers"
  - "Nothing Like Murder"
  - "No Smoking"
  - "Season's Greetings!"
  - "The One and Only East"
  - "Earthset and Evening Star"
  - "Friday the Thirteenth"
  - "The Unabridged"
  - "The Ultimate Crime"
- Casebook of the Black Widowers (1980)
  - "The Cross of Lorraine"
  - "The Family Man"
  - "The Sports Page"
  - "Second Best"
  - "The Missing Item"
  - "The Next Day"
  - "Irrelevance!"
  - "None So Blind"
  - "The Backward Look"
  - "What Time Is It?"
  - "Middle Name"
  - "To the Barest"
- Banquets of the Black Widowers (1984)
  - "Sixty Million Trillion Combinations"
  - "The Woman in the Bar"
  - "The Driver"
  - "The Good Samaritan"'
  - "The Year of the Action"
  - "Can You Prove It?"
  - "The Phoenician Bauble"
  - "A Monday in April"
  - "Neither Brute Nor Human"
  - "The Redhead"
  - "The Wrong House"
  - "The Intrusion"
- Puzzles of the Black Widowers (1990)
  - "The Fourth Homonym"
  - "Unique Is Where You Find It"
  - "The Lucky Piece"
  - "Triple Devil"
  - "Sunset on the Water"
  - "Where Is He?"
  - "The Old Purse"
  - "The Quiet Place"
  - "The Four-Leaf Clover"
  - "The Envelope"
  - "The Alibi"
  - "The Recipe"
- The Return of the Black Widowers (2003)
  - "Northwestward" (reprinted from Magic)
  - "Yes, But Why"
  - "Lost In a Space Warp"
  - "Police at the Door"
  - "The Haunted Cabin"
  - "The Guest's Guest"
  - "The Last Story" (by Charles Ardai)
  - "The Acquisitive Chuckle" (reprinted from Tales of the Black Widowers)
  - "Ph As In Phoney" (reprinted from Tales of the Black Widowers)
  - "Early Sunday Morning" (reprinted from Tales of the Black Widowers)
  - "The Obvious Factor" (reprinted from Tales of the Black Widowers)
  - "The Iron Gem" (reprinted from More Tales of the Black Widowers)
  - "To the Barest" (reprinted from Casebook of the Black Widowers)
  - "Sixty Million Trillion Combinations" (reprinted from Banquets of the Black Widowers)
  - "The Wrong House" (reprinted from Banquets of the Black Widowers)
  - "The Redhead" (reprinted from Banquets of the Black Widowers)
  - "Triple Devil" (reprinted from Puzzles of the Black Widowers)
  - "The Woman in the Bar" (reprinted from Banquets of the Black Widowers)
