= Trap Door Spiders =

New York literary society

The Trap Door Spiders are a literary, male-only eating, drinking, and arguing society in New York City, with a membership historically composed of notable science fiction personalities. The name is a reference to the reclusive habits of the trapdoor spider, which when it enters its burrow pulls the hatch shut behind it.

== History and practices ==
The Trap Door Spiders were established by author Fletcher Pratt in 1944 to exclude operatic soprano Mildred Baldwin, in response to the June 7, 1943, marriage between Baldwin and Pratt's friend John D. Clark. Baldwin was unpopular with her husband's friends, despite their participation in the ceremony (Pratt's wife, Inga Stephens Pratt, was matron of honor, and L. Sprague de Camp served as Clark's best man). Pratt reasoned that the club would give them an excuse to spend time with Clark without Baldwin. The club's presidency rotated among the members, the president for a given evening being the member who had volunteered to host the meeting by giving the dinner and supplying a guest. Over the course of its existence the Trap Door Spiders has counted among its members numerous professional men, many of them writers and editors active in the science fiction genre, along with some prominent fans such as Clark.

The get-togethers of the Trap Door Spiders followed a consistent format: a dinner, given by the host for the evening, to which he would invite a guest who would be grilled by the others and form the focus of conversation for the evening. The grilling was traditionally begun by the host for the evening asking the guest "How do you justify your existence?" or some variation, such as "Why do you exist?" Jack Coggins remembers that an editor for Reader's Digest went home from a meeting in tears after a brutally personal grilling. Coggins once invited Worthen Paxton, art director of Life Magazine, to a meeting. As of 1976, the club met roughly one Friday a month, eight or nine times a year, and maintained a membership of 13, among whom the privilege of hosting the meetings rotated. The host of a meeting selected the restaurant, wine, and menu for the evening, and could invite one or two guests he believed might prove interesting to the other members.

The group remained active through at least January 16, 1990, when its members attended a party given by Doubleday for Isaac Asimov at Tavern on the Green in New York City. The event commemorated Asimov's 70th birthday and the 40th anniversary of the publication of his first book. According to de Camp, the club was "still thriving" as of 1996.

== Membership ==
Membership of the club was by invitation, and varied as some Trap Door Spiders died or moved away (or in at least one instance was dropped by the consensus of the other members) and as others were admitted on the nomination of existing members. Men known to have been members of the club include:

- John Ashmead (1917–1992), author, English professor
- Isaac Asimov (1920–1992), author
- Don Bensen (1927–1997), editor
- Gilbert Cant (1909–1982), editor
- Lin Carter (1930–1988), author
- Lionel Casson (1914–2009), archaeologist
- John Drury Clark (1907–1988), chemist
- Jack Coggins (1911–2006), artist, author
- L. Sprague de Camp (1907–2000), author
- Lester del Rey (1915–1993), author, editor
- Kenneth Franklin (1923–2007), astronomer, educator
- Martin Gardner (1914–2010), math and science writer
- Richard Edes Harrison (1901–1994), cartographer
- Stefan Kanfer (1933–2018), journalist, author
- Charles H. King (1934–2017), novelist
- Caleb Barrett Laning (1906–1991), admiral, writer
- Willy Ley (1906–1969), science writer
- Jean Le Corbeiller (1937–2010), math professor
- Fletcher Pratt (1897–1956), author
- George Scithers (1929–2010), author, editor
- L. Roper Shamhart (1926–2017), Episcopal minister
- John Silbersack (b. 1954), publisher, agent
- George O. Smith (1911–1981), author
- Harrison Smith, publisher
- Theodore Sturgeon (1918–1985), author
- Donald Wilde (1926–2015), ad executive, playwright
- Robert Zicklin, lawyer

According to magician and skeptic James Randi, other prominent figures attending Trap Door Spiders meetings included authors Frederik Pohl, L. Ron Hubbard, and Randi himself. All three appear to have attended as guests rather than members (Pohl wrote that he was never a member), though Randi considered himself an "honorary" member.

Owing to the writings of Asimov (see below), those most closely associated with the group are Bensen, Cant, Carter, Clark, de Camp, del Rey, and Asimov himself.

== The Trap Door Spiders in fiction ==
The Trap Door Spiders are fictionalized in L. Sprague de Camp's historical novel The Bronze God of Rhodes (1960) as "The Seven Strangers," a social club holding symposia in the ancient Greek city-state of Rhodes. Such Spider elements as the rotating presidency and the question put to guests are faithfully represented in the practices of the Strangers.

The club was also the inspiration for Isaac Asimov's fictional group of puzzle solvers the Black Widowers, protagonists of a long-running series of mystery short stories beginning in 1971. Asimov, a Boston resident who was often an invited guest of the Trap Door Spiders when in New York, became a permanent member of the club when he moved to the area in 1970.

Asimov loosely modeled his fictional "Black Widowers" on six of the real-life Trap Door Spiders. He gave his characters professions somewhat more varied than those of their models, while retaining aspects of their personalities and appearances. Asimov's characters and their real-life counterparts are:

- Geoffrey Avalon (L. Sprague de Camp)
- Emmanuel Rubin (Lester del Rey)
- James Drake (John Drury Clark)
- Thomas Trumbull (Gilbert Cant)
- Mario Gonzalo (Lin Carter)
- Roger Halsted (Don Bensen)

Other nonfictional men, including members of the Spiders and others, also occasionally appear in the series in fictional guise. These include Fletcher Pratt (albeit deceased and offstage) as Widowers founder Ralph Ottur in the story "To the Barest," and (as guests) Asimov himself (in a humorously unflattering portrayal) as arrogant author Mortimer Stellar in "When No Man Pursueth", James Randi as stage magician The Amazing Larri in "The Cross of Lorraine", and Harlan Ellison as writer Darius Just (a character who first appeared as protagonist of Asimov's 1976 mystery novel Murder at the ABA) in "The Woman in the Bar."

The remaining member of the Widowers, the group's waiter and unfailing sleuth Henry Jackson, was completely fictional. Asimov likened him to Jeeves from P.G. Wodehouse's Bertie Wooster novels.
