= John Boardman (physicist) =

American physicist (1932–2025)

- Born: Jack Melton Boardman; September 8, 1932; Turlock, California, U.S.
- Died: May 29, 2025 (aged 92); Montgomery Village, Maryland, U.S.
- Education: University of Chicago; Iowa State University; Syracuse University
- Known for: Science fiction, board games
- Spouse: Perdita Lilly Nelson Girsdansky (died 2017)
- Children: 2
- Scientific career
- Thesis: Quantization of the general theory of relativity. (1962)
- Doctoral advisor: Peter Bergmann

Jack Melton "John" Boardman (September 8, 1932 – May 29, 2025) was an American physicist. He was a professor of physics and astronomy at Queens College and then Brooklyn College (where he spent the majority of his career) in New York City; an internationally renowned science fiction fan, author and fanzine publisher; and a gaming authority.

== Academic career ==
Boardman received his B.A. from the University of Chicago in 1952 and his M.S. from Iowa State University in 1956. He then attended Florida State University to begin his doctoral studies. However, he was expelled in 1957 due to his involvement with the Inter-Civic Council and more specifically for inviting three Black Florida A&M University exchange students to a Christmas party.

He ultimately received his Ph.D. in physics from Syracuse University in 1962; his doctoral thesis was titled Quantization of the General Theory of Relativity. His publications include "Spherical Gravitational Waves" (a collaboration with his advisor, Peter Bergmann, who had served as research assistant to Albert Einstein between 1936 and 1941), "Contributions to the Quantization Problem in General Relativity", and "The Normal Modes Of A Hanging Oscillator Of Order N".

== Boardman and gaming ==
Boardman was involved in early play-by-mail (PBM) for the Diplomacy game, and for a small fee he would send copies of each player's turns to every other player involved in a game. He was one of the most noted figures in the game of Diplomacy, having established the original play-by-mail setup in 1961, and also the system of numbering each game for statistical purposes. These numbers, known as Boardman Numbers, include the year and a letter indicating sequence. For instance, 2004A was the first game started in 2004.

Boardman started the first successful postal Diplomacy zine, Graustark, in 1963 as an offshoot from his science fiction fanzine Knowable. Soon Graustark grew from just a gameturn-report newsletter to a hobby activity similar to science fiction fanzines. Boardman continued to produce Graustark for almost 50 years, publishing issue 793 in June 2013.

== Science fiction ==
Boardman was long an active member of science fiction fandom, famed for his strong political opinions; and has been the subject of at least two filksongs: "To John Boardman in Brooklyn" and "All Hail to the Fan John B." In addition to Knowable, his science fiction fanzines have included Dagon and Anakreon. He also wrote at least two published fantasy stories, "Colon the Conqueror" (a Conan the Barbarian parody), published in the May 1958 issue of Fantastic Universe; and "The Testament of Snefru", published in the 1980 anthology The Spell of Conan (L. Sprague de Camp, ed.).

=== "The Asteroid Light" ===
Boardman's 1961 filksong, "The Asteroid Light" (to the tune of the sea chanty "Eddystone Light") has been reprinted repeatedly, in venues ranging from science fiction anthologies (the 1972 anthology Futures Conditional) to Sing Out magazine (V. 9, #1, p. 24) to collections of protest music (Glazer, Tom. Songs of Peace, Freedom and Protest. New York: David McKay, 1970). It has also frequently been discussed in papers on filk music.

He also wrote a regular column, "Science for Science Fiction", for the first twelve issues of Ares magazine.

== Personal life and death ==
After having been a resident of the Flatbush neighborhood of Brooklyn, New York since 1969 (his family's longtime home at 234 East 19th Street in the Beverley Square East subsection was used as a set in fellow Brooklynite Spike Lee's Malcolm X), Boardman primarily lived in the Washington metropolitan area (including a long stint in Frederick, Maryland) beginning in the early 2010s due to the presence of nearby family and increasingly paramount health exigencies. His wife, Perdita Lilly Nelson Girsdansky, who was previously married to Ray Nelson, died on November 26, 2017 after a long battle with dementia.

Boardman died in his sleep in Montgomery Village, Maryland, on May 29, 2025, at the age of 92.
