= George H. Scithers =

American writer (1929–2010)

- Born: May 14, 1929
- Died: April 19, 2010 (aged 80)
- Occupation: Editor
- Writing career
- Genre: Science fiction
- Notable works: Isaac Asimov's Science Fiction Magazine, Amazing Stories, Weird Tales
- Notable awards: Hugo Award (1978, 1980) Best Professional Editor; Hugo Award (1964, 1968) Best Fanzine; World Fantasy Award (2002) Life Achievement; World Fantasy Award (1992) Special Award

George H. Scithers (May 14, 1929 – April 19, 2010) was an American science fiction fan, author and editor.

A long-time member of the World Science Fiction Society, he published a fanzine starting in the 1950s, wrote short stories, and moved on to edit several prominent science fiction magazines, as well as a number of anthologies. As editor emeritus of Weird Tales, he lectured at the Library of Congress in 2008. Wildside Press published his most recent book, Cat Tales: Fantastic Feline Fiction, in 2008.

== Biography ==
=== Career ===
Scithers' first published fiction, the story "Faithful Messenger", appeared in If magazine in 1969. His involvement in the field, however, dates back to 1957, when he began submitting to the fanzine Yandro. Two years later, he began publishing the Hugo Award-winning fanzine Amra. The term swords and sorcery first appeared there, and Amra became a leading proponent of the subgenre. Several of the articles originally published in Amra were later reprinted as part of two volumes about Conan the Barbarian, which Scithers co-edited with L. Sprague de Camp.

In 1963, Scithers chaired Discon I, the 21st Worldcon, held in Washington, D.C. He was a regular parliamentarian for business meetings of the World Science Fiction Society and authored a guide to running science fiction conventions, The Con-Committee Chairman's Guide based on his experiences chairing DisCon 1 in 1963.

In 1973, Scithers founded Owlswick Press, a small independent publishing company. In 1976, Owlswick published Scithers' book (under the pseudonym Karl Würf), To Serve Man: A Cookbook for People (including recipes for "Boiled Leg of Man", "Texas Chili with Cowboy", and "Person Kebabs").

In 1977, he was named the first editor for Isaac Asimov's Science Fiction Magazine (IASFM). He remained in that position until 1982 and won two more Hugo Awards for his work there. After leaving IASFM, Scithers took the helm at Amazing Stories and edited that magazine until 1986.

In 1988, he worked with John Gregory Betancourt and Darrell Schweitzer to re-establish Weird Tales, the magazine that had introduced one of his earliest interests, Conan the Barbarian, to the world. In 1992, he and Schweitzer won a World Fantasy Award for their work on Weird Tales.

In 2001, Scithers was the fan guest of honor at the Worldcon, Millennium Philcon.

At the 2002 World Fantasy Convention in Minneapolis, both Scithers and Forrest J Ackerman won the World Fantasy Lifetime Achievement Awards.

=== Personal life ===
Scithers served in the Korean War with the United States Army. He was a member of the all-male literary banqueting club the Trap Door Spiders, which served as the basis of Isaac Asimov's fictional group of mystery solvers the Black Widowers. He was also very fond of owls and trains. He resided in King of Prussia, Pennsylvania where Weird Tales was edited in his basement, followed by Rockville, Maryland.

=== Death ===
Scithers died April 19, 2010, two days after suffering a heart attack.

== Bibliography ==
=== Anthologies ===
- Astronauts and Androids: Asimov's Choice (1977)
- Black Holes and Bug-eyed Monsters: Asimov's Choice (1977)
- Comets and Computers: Asimov's Choice (1978)
- Dark Stars and Dragons: Asimov's Choice (1978)
- Extraterrestrials and Eclipses: Asimov's Choice (1978)
- Isaac Asimov's Masters of Science Fiction (1978) with Isaac Asimov
- Isaac Asimov's Adventures of Science Fiction (1980) with Isaac Asimov
- Isaac Asimov's Marvels of Science Fiction (1979)
- Isaac Asimov's Worlds of Science Fiction (198 ko 0)
- Isaac Asimov's Near Futures and Far (1981)
- Tales from the Spaceport Bar (1986) with Darrell Schweitzer
- Another Round at the Spaceport Bar (1989) with Darrell Schweitzer
- Cat Tales#1 (2007)
- Cat Tales: Fantastic Feline Fiction (2008)

=== Non-fiction ===
- Con-Committee Chairman's Guide (1965)
- The Conan Swordbook (1969) with L. Sprague de Camp
- The Conan Grimoire (1972) with L. Sprague de Camp
- To Serve Man: A Cookbook for People (1976)
- On Writing Science Fiction (The Editors Strike Back!) (1981) with Darrell Schweitzer and John M. Ford
