= From Unknown Worlds =

Anthology of fantasy fiction short stories

- Cover of the first edition
- Editor: John W. Campbell. Jr.
- Illustrator: Edd Cartier
- Cover artist: Edd Cartier
- Language: English
- Genre: Fantasy
- Publisher: Street & Smith
- Publication date: 1948
- Publication place: United States
- Media type: Print (paperback)
- Pages: 130

From Unknown Worlds is an anthology of fantasy fiction short stories edited by John W. Campbell, Jr. and illustrated by Edd Cartier, the first of a number of anthologies drawing their contents from the classic magazine Unknown of the 1930s-40s. It was first published in magazine format by American company Street & Smith in 1948; the publication was an attempt to determine if there was a market for a revived Unknown. Street & Smith printed 300,000 copies, against the advice of John Campbell, but although it sold better than the original, too many copies were returned for the publisher to be willing to revive the magazine. The first British edition was issued by Atlas Publishing in 1952; part of the run was issued in a hardcover binding. This edition omitted the story "One Man's Harp.".

The book collects fifteen tales, one article and three poems by various authors, together with a foreword by the editor.

== Contents ==
- "Foreword" (The Editor)
- "The Enchanted Weekend" (John MacCormac) (Unknown, Oct. 1939)
- "The Refugee" (Jane Rice) (Unknown Worlds, Oct. 1943)
- "Nothing in the Rules" (L. Sprague de Camp) (Unknown, July 1939)
- "The Cloak" (Robert Bloch) (Unknown, May 1939)
- "Yesterday Was Monday" (Theodore Sturgeon) (Unknown Fantasy Fiction, June 1941)
- "Lurani" (poem) (Paul Dennis Lavond) (Unknown Fantasy Fiction, Feb. 1940)
- "Trouble with Water" (H. L. Gold) (Unknown, Mar. 1939)
- "Black Cats" (poem) (Cristel Hastings) (Unknown Fantasy Fiction, Dec. 1940)
- "Anything" (Philip St. John) (Unknown, Oct. 1939)
- "The Compleat Werewolf" (Anthony Boucher) (Unknown Worlds, Apr. 1942)
- "The Dawn of Reason" (poem) (James H. Beard) (Unknown, Oct. 1939)
- "One Man's Harp" (Babette Rosmond) (Unknown Worlds, Aug. 1943)
- "The Devil We Know" (Henry Kuttner) (Unknown Fantasy Fiction, Aug. 1941)
- "The Psychomorph" (E. A. Grosser) (Unknown Fantasy Fiction, Feb. 1940)
- "The Hexer" (H. W. Guernsey) (Unknown, June 1939)
- "The Summons" (Don Evans) (Unknown, June 1939)
- "Disbelief" (article) (uncredited)
- "Jesus Shoes" (Allan R. Bosworth) (Unknown Worlds, Apr. 1942)
- "Fiction" (poem) (Alan Grant) (Unknown Fantasy Fiction, Feb. 1941)
