= Hell Hath Fury (anthology) =

- Dust cover of Hell Hath Fury
- Author: edited by George Hay
- Language: English
- Genre: Fantasy short stories
- Publisher: Neville Spearman
- Publication date: 1963
- Publication place: United Kingdom
- Media type: Print (hardcover)
- Pages: 240 pp

Hell Hath Fury is an anthology of fantasy fiction short stories edited by George Hay, the third of a number of anthologies drawing their contents from the classic magazine Unknown of the 1930s-1940s. It was first published in hardcover by Neville Spearman in October 1963.

The book collects seven tales by various authors, together with a preface by the editor.

== Contents ==
- "Preface" (George Hay)
- "Hell Hath Fury" (Cleve Cartmill) (Unknown Worlds, Aug. 1943)
- "The Bleak Shore" (Fritz Leiber, Jnr.) (Unknown Fantasy Fiction, Nov. 1940)
- "The Frog" (P. Schuyler Miller) (Unknown Worlds, Oct. 1942)
- "The Refugee" (Jane Rice) (Unknown Worlds, Oct. 1943)
- "The Devil's Rescue" (L. Ron Hubbard) (Unknown Fantasy Fiction, Oct. 1940)
- "The Cloak" (Robert Bloch) (Unknown, May 1939)
- "The Extra Bricklayer" (A. M. Phillips) (Unknown Fantasy Fiction, Sep. 1940)
