= The Reluctant Shaman and Other Fantastic Tales =

1970 collection of short stories by L. Sprague de Camp

- Cover of The Reluctant Shaman
- Author: L. Sprague de Camp
- Cover artist: Ralph Brillhart
- Language: English
- Genre: Fantasy
- Publisher: Pyramid Books
- Publication date: 1970
- Publication place: United States
- Media type: Print (paperback)
- Pages: 190

The Reluctant Shaman and Other Fantastic Tales is a collection of short stories by American science fiction and fantasy author L. Sprague de Camp, first published in paperback by Pyramid Books in November 1970. An E-book edition was published by Gollancz's SF Gateway imprint on September 29, 2011 as part of a general release of de Camp's works in electronic form. The pieces were originally published between 1939 and 1958 in the magazines Thrilling Wonder Stories, Unknown, and Fantastic Universe. The collection has also been translated into French and German.

The book contains short fantasies by the author, most of them with contemporary settings, although the final piece is one of his "Pusadian" tales set in an antediluvian world patterned after Robert E. Howard's Hyborian Age.

== Contents ==
- "The Reluctant Shaman"

Virgil Hathaway, an Algonquian Indian running a souvenir shop in Gahato, New York, is stuck with the task of babysitting a band of stone-throwing sprites from the Iroquois country. When they begin terrorizing the town in their efforts to be "helpful" he has to bone up quickly on Iroquoian magic in order to control them.

- "The Hardwood Pile"

When Dan Pringle's Gahato sawmill processes a tree harboring a dryad, the spirit, having no other home, remains with the resulting pile of lumber, "haunting" it to prevent its dispersal. A running conflict between the two ensues, ending only when Pringle agrees to sell the whole pile to renovate the dance floor of a local bar, at which his antagonist then becomes an employee.

- "Nothing in the Rules"

Accusations of foul play ensue when a mermaid is entered at a swim meet, but the stratagem appears perfectly legal. No such ploy ever having been envisioned, it turns out that nothing in the rules states a contestant can't have a tail, or even has to be human...

- "The Ghosts of Melvin Pye"

A shady landlord's best tenant gives notice because the home he rents is being haunted by the spirit of a former resident. Skeptical, the landlord puts a private detective on the case, then a swami, and finally a psychiatrist, as it turns out the ghost has a split personality; one trouble-making and aggressive, and the other timid and inoffensive. The psychiatrist attempts to solve the problem by reintegrating the spirit's two identities, but the consequences are unexpected.

- "The Wisdom of the East"

An artist who signs up for a yoga course is intrigued to discover that his guru possesses actual mystic powers. Unable to endure the difficulties of the class, he switches teachers, only to find his new master an unprincipled, lecherous predator with designs on the female students. The trouble is that he is an adept in Eastern sorcery as well...

- "Mr. Arson"

Carl Grinnig accidentally conjures up a Saldine or fire-elemental while taking a correspondence course on Nigromancy. The Saldine, Mr. Arson, plans to unleash his fellow Saldines on the human world, and his control of heat and flame appears to make him unstoppable - until the author of the course pamphlets figures out how to give him more than he can handle.

- "Ka the Appalling"

In a prehistoric civilization forgotten by history, Gezun of Lorsk is saved from a mob in the city of Typhon by the larcenous wizard Ugaph, and enters his service. After Ugaph is nearly caught attempting to rob the Temple of Ip, he and Gezun plot to con the Typhonians by pretending to represent a new god, Ka the Appalling, who requires offerings. Unfortunately, they do too good a job at making their invented god real in the minds of their marks...

== Reception ==
Everett F. Bleiler praised the collection for its "well-handled humor" and "particularly interesting" backgrounds, notably the Indian lore in the title story and "the workings of a lumber yard" in "The Hardwood Pile." He considered the best stories to be "The Hardwood Pile" and "Nothing in the Rules."

== Relationship to other works ==
The characters of Virgil Hathaway and Henri Michod from "The Reluctant Shaman" and "The Hardwood Pile", set in the fictional town of Gahato in upstate New York, were much later reused by de Camp in two of his tales of W. Wilson Newbury, "The Huns" (1978) and "Darius" (1977).

== Awards ==
The anthology placed eleventh in the 1971 Locus Poll Award for Best Anthology/Collection.
