= An Inhabitant of Carcosa =

- Short story by Ambrose Bierce

Text available at Wikisource
- Country: United States
- Language: English
- Genre: Short story

Publication
- Media type: Print
- Publication date: 1886

"An Inhabitant of Carcosa" is a short story by American Civil War veteran and writer Ambrose Bierce. It was first published in the San Francisco Newsletter of December 25, 1886 and was later reprinted as part of Bierce's collections Tales of Soldiers and Civilians and Can Such Things Be?

The first-person narrative concerns a man from the ancient city of Carcosa who awakens from a sickness-induced sleep to find himself lost in an unfamiliar wilderness.

== Synopsis ==
A man from the city of Carcosa, contemplating the words of the philosopher Hali concerning the nature of death, wanders through an unfamiliar wilderness. He does not know how he came there, but recalls that he was sick in bed. He worries that he has wandered outdoors in a state of insensibility. The man calms himself as he surveys his surroundings. He is aware that it is cold, though he does not exactly feel cold. He follows an ancient paved road, and sees the disassembled remnants of tombstones and tombs. He comes across a lynx, an owl, and a strange man dressed in animal skins carrying a torch, who ignores the narrator. For the first time, the man becomes aware that it must be night, though he can see as clear as day. The man sits near a tree whose roots emerge from a grave. Looking at the stone that once marked the grave, he sees his name, the date of his birth, and the date of his death. He then realizes that he is dead, and is amid the ruins of the "ancient and famous city of Carcosa."

A footnote at the end of the story states: "Such are the facts imparted to the medium Bayrolles by the spirit Hoseib Alar Robardin."

== Influence ==
- Carcosa was subsequently borrowed by Robert W. Chambers as the setting of his fictional play, The King in Yellow, and features heavily in many of the stories in the book of the same name.
- Alluding to The King in Yellow, Carcosa was mentioned in the first season of the TV series True Detective.
- The fictional ancient African empire Khokarsa used by Philip José Farmer in his prehistoric fantasy novels Hadon of Ancient Opar, Flight to Opar, and The Song of Kwasin (the Khokarsa series) was also inspired by this story.
- Mentioned as a description of relativity "BEFORE Einstein" in The Illuminatus! Trilogy by Robert Shea and Robert Anton Wilson.
- "An Inhabitant of Carcosa" was included in the anthology The Fantasy Hall of Fame (1983), compiled by Robert Silverberg and Martin H. Greenberg from stories selected by members of the World Fantasy Convention in 1981 and 1982.
- George R. R. Martin makes reference to the story by describing a city named Carcosa in The World of Ice and Fire
