= The Fantasy Hall of Fame (1998 anthology) =

Anthology of fantasy short stories by Robert Silverberg

- Cover of first edition
- Author: edited by Robert Silverberg
- Cover artist: Carl Galian
- Language: English
- Genre: Fantasy
- Publisher: HarperPrism
- Publication date: 1998
- Publication place: United States
- Media type: Print (paperback)
- Pages: xii, 562 pp.
- ISBN: 0-06-105215-9

The Fantasy Hall of Fame is an anthology of fantasy short works edited by Robert Silverberg, cover-billed as "the definitive collection of the best modern fantasy" as "chosen by the members of the Science Fiction & Fantasy Writers of America." It was first published in trade paperback by HarperPrism in March 1998. A hardcover edition issued by the same publisher with the Science Fiction Book Club followed in August of the same year. It has been translated into Italian and Polish. This work should not be confused with the earlier anthology of the same title with different content (only four stories are common to the two books) edited by Silverberg together with Martin H. Greenberg for Arbor House in October 1983.

The book collects thirty novellas, novelettes and short stories by various authors, together with an introduction by Silverberg.

== Contents ==
- "Introduction" (Robert Silverberg)
- "Trouble with Water" (H. L. Gold)
- "Nothing in the Rules" (L. Sprague de Camp)
- "Fruit of Knowledge" (C. L. Moore)
- "Tlön, Uqbar, Orbis Tertius" (Jorge Luis Borges)
- "The Compleat Werewolf" (Anthony Boucher)
- "The Small Assassin" (Ray Bradbury)
- "The Lottery" (Shirley Jackson)
- "Our Fair City" (Robert A. Heinlein)
- "There Shall Be No Darkness" (James Blish)
- "The Loom of Darkness" (Jack Vance)
- "The Man Who Sold Rope to the Gnoles" (Margaret St. Clair)
- "The Silken-Swift" (Theodore Sturgeon)
- "The Golem" (Avram Davidson)
- "Operation Afreet" (Poul Anderson)
- "That Hell-Bound Train" (Robert Bloch)
- "The Bazaar of the Bizarre" (Fritz Leiber)
- "Come Lady Death" (Peter S. Beagle)
- "The Drowned Giant" (J. G. Ballard)
- "Narrow Valley" (R. A. Lafferty)
- "Faith of Our Fathers" (Philip K. Dick)
- "The Ghost of a Model T" (Clifford D. Simak)
- "The Demoness" (Tanith Lee)
- "Jeffty Is Five" (Harlan Ellison)
- "The Detective of Dreams" (Gene Wolfe)
- "Unicorn Variations" (Roger Zelazny)
- "Basileus" (Robert Silverberg)
- "The Jaguar Hunter" (Lucius Shepard)
- "Buffalo Gals, Won't You Come Out Tonight" (Ursula K. Le Guin)
- "Bears Discover Fire" (Terry Bisson)
- "Tower of Babylon" (Ted Chiang)
