= Unknown (1988 anthology) =

Fantasy fiction short story anthology

- Cover of Unknown
- Editor: Stanley Schmidt
- Cover artist: Tom Kidd
- Language: English
- Genre: Fantasy short stories
- Publisher: Baen Books
- Publication date: 1988
- Publication place: United States
- Media type: Print (Paperback)
- Pages: 304 pp

Unknown is an anthology of fantasy fiction short stories edited by Stanley Schmidt, the fifth of a number of anthologies drawing their contents from the classic magazine Unknown of the 1930s-1940s. It was first published in paperback by Baen Books in October 1988.

The book collects nine tales by various authors, together with an introduction by the editor.

== Contents ==
- "Introduction" (Stanley Schmidt)
- "The Compleat Werewolf" (Anthony Boucher (Unknown Worlds, Apr. 1942)
- "The Coppersmith" (Lester del Rey (Unknown, Sep. 1939)
- "A God in a Garden" (Theodore Sturgeon (Unknown, Oct. 1939)
- "Even the Angels" (Malcolm Jameson (Unknown Fantasy Fiction, Aug. 1941)
- "Smoke Ghost" (Fritz Leiber (Unknown Worlds, Oct. 1941)
- "Nothing in the Rules" (L. Sprague de Camp ((Unknown, Jul. 1939)
- "A Good Knight's Work" (Robert Bloch (Unknown Worlds, Oct. 1941)
- "The Devil We Know" (Henry Kuttner (Unknown Fantasy Fiction, Aug. 1941)
- "The Angelic Angleworm" (Fredric Brown (Unknown Worlds, Feb. 1943)
