= Memory Seed =

Novel by Stephen Palmer published in 1996

Memory Seed is a novel by Stephen Palmer published by Orbit in 1996.

== Plot summary ==
Memory Seed is a novel in which a young girl tries to discover the truth about her world as plants are taking over.

== Reception ==
Paul Pettengale reviewed Memory Seed for Arcane magazine, rating it a 6 out of 10 overall. Pettengale comments that "The plot twists occasionally, but its linearity is ultimately obvious, as is the writing style used to weave the storyline. A pleasant read, if not a gripping one."

== Reviews ==
- Review by Faren Miller (1996) in Locus, #424 May 1996
- Review by Paul J. McAuley (1996) in Interzone, #108 June 1996
- Review by Julie Atkin (1996) in Vector 189, p32
- Review by Kev McVeigh (1996) in Foundation, #67 Summer 1996
