= Mañana Literary Society =

The Mañana Literary Society was an informal meeting of science fiction writers in Los Angeles, California. Hosted by Robert A. Heinlein and his second wife Leslyn at their Laurel Canyon home, the membership included authors such as Anthony Boucher, Arthur K. Barnes, Edmond Hamilton, L. Ron Hubbard, Henry Kuttner, C.L. Moore, L. Sprague de Camp, Cleve Cartmill, Leigh Brackett, Roby Wentz, and Jack Williamson. The young Ray Bradbury, who had not yet made his first story sale, was a guest at one or two meetings. The weekly meetings took place in 1940 and 1941, until the Pearl Harbor attack resulting in the U.S. entering World War II.

== Rocket to the Morgue ==
The society and many of its members appear, thinly veiled, in Boucher's Rocket to the Morgue, whose dedication (in the first edition, read "For The Mañana Literary Society and in particular for Robert Heinlein and Cleve Cartmill." Rocket to the Morgue is something of a roman à clef. Many characters are thinly veiled versions of personalities such as Robert A. Heinlein ("Austin Carter"), L. Ron Hubbard ("D. Vance Wimpole"), then-literary agent Julius Schwartz ("M. Halstead Phynn") and rocket scientist/occultist/fan Jack Parsons ("Hugo Chantrelle"); or recognizable composites of two writers ("Matt Duncan" - Cleve Cartmill and Henry Kuttner; "Joe Henderson" - Jack Williamson and Edmond Hamilton). Some writers' actual pseudonyms appear as minor characters, most prominently "Don Stuart, editor of Surprising" (John W. Campbell, editor of Astounding Science Fiction); but also "Anson Macdonald", "Lyle Monroe" (both Heinlein pseudonyms)... and Anthony Boucher (whose real name was William Anthony Parker White).
