= Nothing in the Rules =

- Short story by L. Sprague de Camp
- illustration of the story in Unknown
- Country: United States
- Language: English
- Genre: Fantasy

Publication
- Published in: Unknown
- Publisher: Street & Smith Publications, Inc.
- Media type: Print (magazine)
- Publication date: July, 1939

"Nothing in the Rules" is a contemporary fantasy story by American writer L. Sprague de Camp.

== Publication history ==
It was first published in the magazine Unknown in July, 1939. It first appeared in book form in the anthology From Unknown Worlds (Street & Smith, 1948). It later appeared in the collections The Reluctant Shaman and Other Fantastic Tales (Pyramid, 1970), The Best of L. Sprague de Camp (Doubleday, 1978), and Aristotle and the Gun and Other Stories (Five Star, 2002), as well as the anthologies The Fantasy Hall of Fame (Arbor House, 1983), The Science Fictional Olympics (Signet, 1984), Mermaids! (Ace Books, 1986), Unknown (Baen, 1988) and The Fantasy Hall of Fame (HarperPrism, 1998) (a different anthology from the 1983 book of the same title). The story has been translated into French, German, and Italian.

== Plot summary ==
Swimming coach Louis Connaught has entered his prize pupil Maria Santalucia in a women's swim meet in expectation of the usual victory; as Santalucia, born with webbed fingers, has an advantage over the other swimmers. Then his arch-rival coach Herbert Laird arrives, causing a strange commotion. When Connaught sees why he shouts a strenuous protest.

The story flashes back to the previous evening, when Herb has his friend, lawyer Mark Vining, over to his house. He has a plan to beat Louis Connaught and wants Mark along "to think up legal reasons why my scheme's okay." He introduces the lawyer to his protégé, Miss Iantha Delfoiros, a young woman in a wheelchair of strikingly exotic appearance. Mark is fascinated by Iantha, but she is evasive about her background. He learns only that she is from Cyprus and has surprising personal habits; for instance, she adds salt to her drinking water on the claim that fresh water makes her drunk, and eats all her food cold. Another layer of mystery is added when Herb asks Mark if he can legally accept gold coins hundreds of years old in exchange for ten thousand swimming caps; a deal supposedly proposed by Iantha. Increasingly concerned about this "crazy business" Mark demands to know what is going on before consenting to be party to it. Swearing him to secrecy, Herb and Iantha agree. Iantha pulls up the blanket covering her lower half to reveal a pair of horizontal flukes where her feet should be.

When the next day they enter Iantha in the swim meet, Connaught is naturally outraged to discover his star pupil will be going up against a mermaid. He raises every objection he can think of, only to be countered by Mark, who calmly citing and interpreting the rules of the swimming association with his legal expertise demonstrates there is in fact "nothing in the rules" to prevent Iantha from competing. And the mermaid performs more than creditably, winning the first race in a record eight seconds. The second has to be redone when Iantha accidentally rams another contestant who strayed from her lane, but she easily comes in first both times. At this point, to Connaught's consternation but Herb's delight, Maria Santalucia refuses to swim in any more races with Iantha. But the conspirators' triumph is short-lived. Iantha is now behaving strangely, breaking out into song and flirting with Mark. Mark and Herb realize she is getting tipsy; it turns out that fresh water really does make her drunk. But she has two more races to go if she is to win the meet. She is sober enough to take the first. Then Connaught asks that the final event be held up a couple of minutes, as one of his swimmers has been "delayed." Herb is suspicious, and justly so, as his rival comes back with a sea lion. With the rules already having been bent as far as they have, the judge allows the entry.

Iantha and the sea lion are the only competitors in the final race, the other contestants refusing to get in the water with an animal. The sea lion, coaxed by rewards of fish at the end of each leg, proves much faster than even the mermaid. It is winning handily until Mark and a couple girls from Herb's swim team run in with bowls of goldfish. Spiking the pool with these, they completely distract the creature from any thought of finishing the race, with the result that Iantha is once again victorious. Connaught is livid, but, as with entering a mermaid, there is nothing in the rules against putting fish in the pool. Mark lets the referee and the coaches fight it out and attends to Iantha, now extremely inebriated, sitting on the edge of the pool, paddling her flukes in the water, and eating some of the goldfish. She whacks the sea lion across the head when it tries to steal some, and again breaks out into song. Mark convinces her to return to her wheelchair, albeit with difficulty, but in picking her up misjudges her weight; both fall into the pool, and Iantha, thinking he is being playful, nearly drowns him responding in kind.

Early the next morning, before an expected swarm of reporters can converge on Herb's house, he and Mark drive Iantha back to the ocean. Mark has a long last talk with the mermaid and learns more of her background and how Herb convinced her to enter the meet. The merfolk, friendly with land people in ancient times, grew wary of them over the ages and now try to keep their existence secret except when they need to trade for goods they cannot make themselves, like knives and spears ... and now, swimcaps. Chosen as her people's representative in negotiating the swimcap deal, she only agreed to appear in Herb's competition because she hadn't realized how much fuss it would raise. She is contrite about having hurt Mark, whom she realizes has become infatuated with her. She returns his feelings, but aware that relationships between members of their two species never turn out well. The two do, however, share a farewell kiss.

After the men see the mermaid off the morose Mark has Herb drop him off at a bar where he can drown his sorrows and try to forget the lovely Iantha.

== Reception ==
Everett F. Bleiler, reviewing The Reluctant Shaman and Other Fantastic Tales, considered "Nothing in the Rules" one of the two best stories in the collection. He praised the collection as a whole for its "well-handled humor."

Kristiana Gregory, writing for the Los Angeles Times, finds the tale "humorous," while David Bratman in Mythprint calls it his "favorite" among de Camp's Unknown stories. In contrast, Adam Carr, reviewing The Mammoth Book of Fantasy All-Time Greats (a later edition of the 1983 anthology The Fantasy Hall of Fame) in The Times regards the story as the "worst offender" among those "most distressing" pieces in the anthology "that try to be funny." He feels de Camp "takes a basically rather small and unfunny idea [and] then flogs it to death and beyond over 22 painful pages."

== Relation to other works ==
De Camp had previously explored the subject of intelligent creatures adapted to undersea life in a science fiction context in "The Merman" (Astounding Science-Fiction, December, 1938). He continued to explore the possibility of romantic entanglements between human beings and merpeople of the traditional mythical type in "The Water Wife," an inset tale in the novel The Unbeheaded King (Del Rey Books, 1983). The plot device of bringing in a fantastic ringer to win a sporting competition is also used in the later short story "Throwback" (1949).
