= Rocket to the Morgue =

1942 novel by Anthony Boucher

First edition

Rocket to the Morgue is a 1942 American locked room mystery novel by Anthony Boucher (originally published as by "H. H. Holmes", Boucher's frequent pseudonym when writing mysteries or writing about mysteries, and the pseudonym of a 19th-century American serial killer).

== Plot ==
Now-dead author Fowler Foulkes and his literary creation "Dr. Derringer" occupy a major position in science fiction: the character has entered popular culture, and is known around the world. The author's son and heir Hilary Foulkes takes a fiercely protective, even predatory, view of the value of this heritage. Hilary has made many enemies due to his inflexibility and greed. His niece Jenny lives in the Foulkes house and works as Hilary's private secretary. Jenny is devoted to Hilary; but her fiancé, Hilary's brother-in-law D. Vance Wimpole (a science fiction writer), wants money (to pay off blackmailers); and he's recently had unpleasant encounters with two other local science fiction authors, Matt Duncan and Joe Henderson. After two suspicious "accidents," Hilary suspects that his life is in danger, and asks for police help. Police Detective Inspector Terry Marshall arrives at the house just as a ticking "box of chocolates" is delivered.

The novel features two investigators from Boucher/Holmes' earlier locked room mystery Nine Times Nine: Sister Ursula of the convent of the fictitious "Sisters of Martha of Bethany," and police detective Terence "Terry" Marshall.

== Reception ==
Dave Langford considers Rocket to be "weaker" than its predecessor Nine Times Nine, and observes that it has a "properly science-fictional though strictly prosaic murder by rocket".

In 2017, James Nicoll noted that, unlike of much of Boucher's work, Rocket to the Morgue was not out of print; he attributed this to "catering to SF fans’ egos." Nicoll also noted that Boucher's afterword "is coy about which particular notoriously litigious estates inspired" Hilary's character; but hypothesized that the character was inspired by the estates of Edgar Rice Burroughs and Arthur Conan Doyle.

The Heinlein Society felt that "As a mystery novel, [it] falls a bit short," and it has "too many characters," but conceded that it is "an intriguing look into the beginnings of science fiction as we know it today"; they also noted that Heinlein's "...And He Built a Crooked House" was published at approximately the same time as when Boucher was writing the chapter in which characters discuss four-dimensional space.

== Portrayal of science fiction culture in the Golden Age ==
Boucher was the friend and mentor of many science fiction writers of that era, and a member of the Mañana Literary Society. The dedication to the first edition reads, "For The Mañana Literary Society and in particular for Robert Heinlein and Cleve Cartmill." Rocket to the Morgue is something of a roman à clef about the Southern California science fiction scene of the time. Many characters are thinly veiled versions of personalities such as Robert A. Heinlein ("Austin Carter"), L. Ron Hubbard ("D. Vance Wimpole"), then-literary agent Julius Schwartz ("M. Halstead Phynn") and rocket scientist/occultist/fan Jack Parsons ("Hugo Chantrelle"); or recognizable composites of two writers ("Matt Duncan" – Cleve Cartmill and Henry Kuttner; "Joe Henderson" – Jack Williamson and Edmond Hamilton). Some writers' actual pseudonyms appear as minor characters, most prominently "Don Stuart, editor of Surprising" (John W. Campbell, editor of Astounding Science Fiction); but also "Anson Macdonald" and "Lyle Monroe" (both Heinlein pseudonyms), and Boucher himself (under his real name of William Anthony Parker White). The science fiction culture is portrayed in a familiar manner, complete with references to Denvention, the 1941 World Science Fiction Convention in Denver, and the appearance of a quintessential science fiction fan, one Arthur Waring, member of a science fiction society and publisher of a science fiction fanzine, whose sophisticated language and scientific knowledge displayed in a fan letter have impressed Detective Marshall, but who when interviewed turns out to be a pre-adolescent: "[a]n infant with pink and downy cheeks".

== Publication history ==
The first edition was published in 1942 (as by "H. H. Holmes") by Duell, Sloan and Pearce. The first paperback edition in 1943 was the first and only book published under the imprint "A Phantom Mystery". It has been repeatedly reprinted (after 1944, as by Anthony Boucher), beginning with a 1952 Dell edition.
