= Andrew Sawyer =

British librarian, critic and editor

Andrew "Andy" Sawyer (born 1952) is a librarian, critic and editor, as well as an active part of science fiction fandom (although he himself has not written much science fiction). He was educated at the Duke of York's Royal Military School and the University of East Anglia. He is married to Mary Sawyer with two daughters.

Sawyer had a long career as the Librarian/Administrator of the Science Fiction Foundation Collection in the Special Collections Department in the Sydney Jones Library at the University of Liverpool, as well as Course Director of the University's M.A. in Science Fiction Studies program. He also serves as Reviews Editor for Foundation: The International Review of Science Fiction. For his work and commitment to the science fiction community, the Science Fiction Research Association awarded him their Thomas D. Clareson Award for Distinguished Service in 2008. He has served as a judge for the Arthur C Clarke Award.

As a critic and editor he writes especially on science fiction and fantasy, but also on other topics of popular literature and popular culture. In addition to Speaking Science Fiction: Dialogues and Interpretations, which he co-edited with David Seed (Liverpool University Press, 2000), his publications include:

- "The Mechanical Art" (short story) in the anthology Digital Dreams (1990)
- "M.R. James in China"
- "'Backward, Turn Backward': Narratives of Reversed Time in Science Fiction"
- "The Shadows out of Time: H. P. Lovecraftian Echoes in Babylon 5"
- "Back with Bunter" (about Frank Richards)
- "Re-assessing one of the earliest books about popular fiction: Q. D. Leavis's famous tirade against bestsellers"
- "Fairy-Tale Horror" (about V. C. Andrews)
- "Far Seeing?" (about Joan Grant)
- "John Wyndham and the Fantastic"
- "Magnolia Blossom and Whiplash" (about Kyle Onstott and Lance Horner)
