= The Hardwood Pile =

- Short story by L. Sprague de Camp
- R. Isip's illustration of the story in Unknown, Sep., 1940
- Country: United States
- Language: English
- Genre: Fantasy

Publication
- Published in: Unknown
- Publisher: Street & Smith
- Media type: Print (Magazine)
- Publication date: September, 1940

"The Hardwood Pile" is a contemporary fantasy story by American writer L. Sprague de Camp. It was first published in the magazine Unknown for September, 1940. It first appeared in book form in the collection The Reluctant Shaman and Other Fantastic Tales (Pyramid, 1970); it later appeared in the collection The Best of L. Sprague de Camp (Doubleday, 1978), and the anthology Bestiary! (Ace Books, 1985) The story has been translated into French and German.

== Plot summary ==
Folklorist R. B. Wilcox, collecting material for a book on the legends of upstate New York, queries Aceria Jones, a Gahato tea room hostess, regarding the village's rumored haunted woodpile. Aceria dismisses the story, but suggestively tells him she would be extremely grateful if he could point her to a job in the vicinity of a Norway maple (Acer platanoides). Moralistically rejecting her advances, Wilcox leaves, unknowingly killing his chance of getting the inside story.

The history of the woodpile goes back to a mansion built by 19th century Swiss immigrant August Rudli, who imported two Norway maples to grace his estate. A century later the house had gone back to nature, but one of the maples still thrived, until all the hardwood timber on the lot was sold and logged in the winter of 1938. The logs cut from the tree end up in Gahato at Dan Pringle's sawmill, where the next spring they are sawn into boards and stored in Pile No. 1027.

The trouble starts the following summer, when Pile 1027 is to be consolidated with Pile 1040 in the wake of a large timber order depleting the top half of each. Mill workers Henri Michod and Olaf Bergen are spooked when the remaining lumber in Pile 1027 begins swaying beneath them for no logical reason. Consequently, they stop work, whereupon their irate foreman Joe Larochelle assigns the job to another millhand. After he and Joe also experience the pile's uncanny behavior, the latter ties down the offending boards and the crew trucks the rest of the wood over to Pile 1040. When they return to load the remainder, however, the boards start flying out of their hands, now seemingly eager to go into the truck. The lumbermen watch in astonishment as the boards load themselves and the truck moves of its own accord over to Pile 1040, where it dumps its load.

Joe goes to Dan Pringle's office to tell what happened; Pringle suspects it some sort of trick perpetrated by union organizers. The two return to the pile, where Pringle encounters a young woman who, to his disquiet, seems invisible and inaudible to anyone but him. Dismissing Joe, he confronts her alone. The woman identifies herself as Aceria, a sphendamniad, or maple spirit, as distinct from dryads, which are oak spirits. She was hibernating when her tree was cut down, but is still bound to its remains, as she can only live in a Norway maple, and there are no others in the vicinity.

Pringle is unsympathetic. He regards the lumber as his property, to be sold off like any other batch of wood. When Aceria warns him she will never let him send the boards away, he pugnaciously accepts the challenge.

In the days that follow, the pile's supernatural reputation grows as Aceria invisibly undermines all efforts by Pringle's employees to move the wood, and begins to sabotage his operation in other ways. She even goes so far as to fool his wife Helen into thinking she is a mortal woman having an affair with him. Pringle refuses to give in. He supervises the next attempt to move the boards himself, offering time and a half to his men. Aceria counterattacks by animating a cloud of sawdust, first as a dust storm and then in the form of a horrifying flying monster. The workers abandon Pringle.

That night he and Joe return to the pile with kerosene and a blowtorch, determined to burn it rather than surrender to Aceria. She responds with the ultimate threat; to organize the mill workers into a union. Since she is a spirit able to materialize and disappear at will, Pringle will have no way to stop her. In despair, he finally surrenders.

They reach an accommodation. Pringle sells the whole pile at a cut rate to the owner of The Pines tea room, Earl Delacroix, who needs a new dance floor. As part of the deal, Delacroix has to hire Aceria as hostess. Now, by day, she works in the tea room and dances with the male customers, while at night she returns "home," merging herself with the floorboards. But she would still prefer a living tree, and so asks all her acquaintances, sooner or later, if they happen to know where a Norway maple grows.

== Reception ==
Everett F. Bleiler, reviewing The Reluctant Shaman and Other Fantastic Tales, considered "The Hardwood Pile" one of the two best stories in the collection, and its background of "the workings of a lumber yard" to be "particularly interesting." He praised the collection as a whole for its "well-handled humor."

Don D'Ammassa considered the story "among his best" of de Camp's "many fine short stories."

== Relation to other works ==
"The Hardwood Pile" is the first of a number of contemporary fantasy stories de Camp set in the fictional town of Gahato and the surrounding Adirondack region of New York, the others being "The Reluctant Shaman" (Thrilling Wonder Stories, Apr. 1947) and some of his Willy Newbury stories, notably "The Lamp" (Fantasy and Science Fiction, March 1975), "Algy" (Fantastic, Aug. 1976), "Darius" (Escape!, fall 1977) and "The Huns" (Fantasy and Science Fiction, May 1978). The characters of Dan Pringle and Henri Michod from "The Hardwood Pile" are reused in "The Reluctant Shaman" and "Darius," respectively.
