= The Fantasy Hall of Fame (1983 anthology) =

- Cover of first edition
- Editors: Robert Silverberg; Martin H. Greenberg
- Cover artist: E. T. Steadman
- Language: English
- Genre: Fantasy
- Publisher: Arbor House
- Publication date: 1983
- Publication place: United States
- Media type: Print (hardcover)
- Pages: x, 292
- ISBN: 0-87795-521-2

The Fantasy Hall of Fame is an anthology of fantasy short works edited by Robert Silverberg and Martin H. Greenberg. It was first published in hardcover by Arbor House in October 1983. The first British edition was issued by Robinson in trade paperback in June 1988 under the alternate title The Mammoth Book of Fantasy All-Time Greats, under which title it was reprinted by the same publisher in July 1990. A second British edition was issued by W. H. Smith in trade paperback under the alternate title Great Fantasy in 2004. This work should not be confused with the later anthology of the same title with different content (only four stories are common to the two books) edited by Silverberg alone for HarperPrism in March 1998.

The book collects twenty-two novelettes and short stories by various authors, together with an introduction by Silverberg.

== Contents ==
- "Introduction" (Robert Silverberg)
- "The Masque of the Red Death" (Edgar Allan Poe)
- "An Inhabitant of Carcosa" (Ambrose Bierce)
- "The Sword of Welleran" (Lord Dunsany)
- "The Woman of the Wood" (A. Merritt)
- "The Weird of Avoosl Wuthoqquan" (Clark Ashton Smith)
- "The Valley of the Worm" (Robert E. Howard)
- "Black God's Kiss" (C. L. Moore)
- "The Silver Key" (H. P. Lovecraft)
- "Nothing in the Rules" (L. Sprague de Camp)
- "A Gnome There Was" (Lewis Padgett (Henry Kuttner and C. L. Moore)
- "Snulbug" (Anthony Boucher)
- "The Words of Guru" (C. M. Kornbluth)
- "Homecoming" (Ray Bradbury)
- "Mazirian the Magician" (Jack Vance)
- "O Ugly Bird!" (Manly Wade Wellman)
- "The Silken-Swift" (Theodore Sturgeon)
- "The Golem" (Avram Davidson)
- "That Hell-Bound Train" (Robert Bloch)
- "Kings in Darkness" (Michael Moorcock (and James Cawthorn, uncredited))
- "Pretty Maggie Moneyeyes" (Harlan Ellison)
- "Gonna Roll the Bones" (Fritz Leiber)
- "The Ones Who Walk Away from Omelas" (Ursula K. Le Guin)
