= The Fishers of Darksea =

1982 novel by Roger Eldridge

- First edition cover
- Author: Roger Eldridge
- Genre: Science fiction
- Published in: United Kingdom
- Publisher: Victor Gollancz Ltd
- Publication date: 1982
- Pages: 192
- ISBN: 9780575032088

The Fishers of Darksea is a science fiction novel by British author Roger Eldridge published by Victor Gollancz Ltd in 1982.

== Plot summary ==
The novel is set on a remote volcanic island threatened by ice floes. A native Fisher sees a gigantic fish and finds an odd device. Although it costs him his position in his tribe, he obsessively pursues the truth about his world.

== Reception ==
Dave Langford reviewed The Fishers of Darksea for White Dwarf #59, and stated that "A truly consistent and well-imagined 'alien' society."

== Reviews ==
- Review by Judith Hanna (1983) in Foundation, #29 November 1983
- British Book News
- Starburst
