= The Unknown Five =

Anthology of American fantasy fiction

- Cover of the first edition.
- Editor: D. R. Bensen
- Illustrator: Edd Cartier
- Cover artist: John Schoenherr
- Language: English
- Genre: Fantasy
- Publisher: Pyramid Books
- Publication date: 1964
- Publication place: United States
- Media type: Print (Paperback)
- Pages: 190
- Preceded by: The Unknown

The Unknown Five is an anthology of American fantasy fiction short stories edited by D. R. Bensen and illustrated by Edd Cartier, the fourth of a number of anthologies drawing their contents from the American magazine Unknown of the 1930s-1940s. It was first published in paperback by Pyramid Books in January 1964. The cover title of this first edition was The Unknown 5; the numeral was spelled out on the title page and copyright statement. The book was reprinted by Jove/HBJ in October 1978. It has also been translated into German. It was a follow-up to a companion anthology, The Unknown, issued in 1963.

The book collects five tales by various authors, together with an introduction by the editor. All are from Unknown but the Asimov piece, which had been slated to appear therein in 1943 but was not then published due to the demise of the magazine.

== Contents ==
- "Introduction" by D. R. Bensen
- "Author! Author!" (by Isaac Asimov)
- "The Bargain" (by Cleve Cartmill; Unknown Worlds, August 1942)
- "The Hag Séleen" (by Theodore Sturgeon and James H. Beard (as by Sturgeon alone; Unknown Worlds, December 1942)
- "Hell Is Forever" (by Alfred Bester; Unknown Worlds, August 1942)
- "The Crest of the Wave" (by Jane Rice; Unknown Fantasy Fiction, June 1941)
