= Lalila =

Lalila may refer to:

== Characters ==
- Lalila, a character the novel Hadon of Ancient Opar by Philip José Farmer
- Lalila, a character in the Mouk TV series

== People ==
- Lalila El Basiouny ranked 37 for Egypt at the 2011 World Aquatics Championships

== See also ==
- Leila (name)
