= The Unknown (1963 anthology) =

1963 anthology

- Cover of the first edition.
- Editor: D. R. Bensen
- Illustrator: Edd Cartier
- Cover artist: John Schoenherr
- Language: English
- Genre: Fantasy
- Publisher: Pyramid Books
- Publication date: 1963
- Publication place: United States
- Media type: Print (paperback)
- Pages: 192
- Followed by: The Unknown Five

The Unknown is an anthology of fantasy fiction short stories edited by D. R. Bensen and illustrated by Edd Cartier, the second of a number of anthologies drawing their contents from the American magazine Unknown of the 1930s-1940s. It was first published in paperback by Pyramid Books in April 1963. It was reprinted by the same publisher in October 1970, and by Jove/HBJ in August 1978 A companion anthology, The Unknown Five, was issued in 1964.

The book collects eleven tales by various authors, together with a foreword by Isaac Asimov and an introduction by the editor.

== Contents ==
- "Foreword" (Isaac Asimov)
- "Introduction" (D. R. Bensen)
- "The Misguided Halo" (Henry Kuttner) (Unknown, Aug. 1939)
- "Prescience" (Nelson S. Bond) (Unknown Worlds, Oct. 1941)
- "Yesterday Was Monday" (Theodore Sturgeon) (Unknown Fantasy Fiction, June 1941)
- "The Gnarly Man" (L. Sprague de Camp) (Unknown, June 1939)
- "The Bleak Shore" (Fritz Leiber) (Unknown Fantasy Fiction, Nov. 1940)
- "Trouble with Water" (H. L. Gold) (Unknown, Mar. 1939)
- "Doubled and Redoubled" (Malcolm Jameson) (Unknown Fantasy Fiction, Feb. 1941)
- "When It Was Moonlight" (Manly Wade Wellman) (Unknown Fantasy Fiction, Feb. 1940)
- "Mr. Jinx" (Fredric Brown and Robert Arthur (as by Arthur alone)) (Unknown Fantasy Fiction, Aug. 1941)
- "Snulbug" (Anthony Boucher) (Unknown Worlds, Dec. 1941)
- " Armageddon" (Fredric Brown) (Unknown Fantasy Fiction, Aug. 1941)
