= The Reluctant Shaman =

- Short story by L. Sprague de Camp
- Leo Morey's illustration of the story in Thrilling Wonder Stories, Apr. 1947
- Country: United States
- Language: English
- Genre: Fantasy

Publication
- Published in: Thrilling Wonder Stories
- Publisher: Standard Magazines, Inc.
- Media type: Print (Magazine)
- Publication date: April, 1947

"The Reluctant Shaman" is a contemporary fantasy story by American writer L. Sprague de Camp. It was first published in the magazine Thrilling Wonder Stories for April 1947. It first appeared in book form in the collection The Reluctant Shaman and Other Fantastic Tales (Pyramid, 1970); it later appeared in the magazine Science Fiction Yearbook no. 5 (Popular Library, Inc., 1971) and the collection The Best of L. Sprague de Camp (Doubleday, 1978). The story has been translated into French and German.

== Plot summary ==
Virgil Hathaway, a Penobscot Indian shopkeeper in Gahato, New York, receives an odd visitor, Charlie Catfish of the Senecas. The fast-talking Catfish, caretaker to eight Gahunga, quickly pawns his charges off on Hathaway before leaving. "You can handle 'em even though you're Algonquin," he says, "being as you're a descendant of Dekanawida." Hathaway is confused, but soon enough the Gahunga, stone-throwing spirits resembling miniature Iroquois warriors, appear to introduce themselves. Gaga, their chief, asks if there's anything Hathaway wants them to do.

Annoyed at the trick Catfish sprung on him, Virgil initially tells them to disappear, but later admits he would like more customers to come in and buy his Indian curios. Soon townspeople out on the street, pelted with pebbles by unseen assailants, are being driven into the shop. They are understandably perturbed, and some suspect Hathaway of having something to do with the situation. After calming them, he angrily orders Gaga to stop, and tells him he doesn't want any more favors. The Gahunga, offended, proclaim they will find someone who better appreciates them, and disappear. Hathaway worries. He tries to call them back, but they fail to respond.

Later, on leaving the shop, Hathaway hears of a number of inexplicable occurrences, all the result of the Gahunga invisibly attempting to "help" people, but causing more harm than good. The shopkeeper is again suspected, this time because of his earlier success in halting the stone throwing. The next day he researches the Gahunga in the public library of nearby Utica, learning that Iroquois shamans know how to control them. He rings up the Tonawanda Reservation for advice.

On returning to Gahato that evening Hathaway learns the Gahunga have been at it again when sawmill owner Dan Pringle runs into his shop. He had been at a phony seance conducted by his son Harvey's girlfriend Barbara Scott, whom he dislikes, only to see it disrupted by apparent evil spirits, which then drove him down the street with well-placed pebbles. Recalling the rumors current about Hathaway, Pringle appeals to him for help. Virgil realizes the Gahunga must have been trying to "help" the young lovers against the disapproving parent.

This time he knows what to do. With an offering of tobacco and a chant in bad Seneca, he summons the Gahunga and threatens them with retribution from Eitsinoha, the Iroquois earth goddess for their misbehavior. The Gahunga are cowed and promise not to do anything more unless he tells them to. As a result of his aid Hathaway is able to wrangle a lower rent from Pringle, who is also his landlord. He begins to think the medicine man business may not be so bad after all—maybe it has commercial possibilities!

== Reception ==
Everett F. Bleiler, reviewing The Reluctant Shaman and Other Fantastic Tales, found the title story's background of Indian lore "particularly interesting," and praised the collection as a whole for its "well-handled humor."

== Relation to other works ==
"The Reluctant Shaman" is the second of a number of contemporary fantasy stories de Camp set in the fictional town of Gahato and the surrounding Adirondack region of New York, the others being "The Hardwood Pile" (Unknown, Sep. 1940) and some of his Willy Newbury stories, notably "The Lamp" (Fantasy and Science Fiction, March 1975), "Algy" (Fantastic, Aug. 1976), "Darius" (Escape!, fall 1977) and "The Huns" (Fantasy and Science Fiction, May 1978). The character of Dan Pringle also appears in "The Hardwood Pile," while Virgil Hathaway and Charlie Catfish also appear in "The Huns."
