= Deadline (science fiction story) =

- Short story by Cleve Cartmill
- Country: United States
- Language: English
- Genre: Science fiction

Publication
- Published in: Astounding Science Fiction
- Publication type: Periodical
- Publisher: Street & Smith
- Media type: Print (Magazine)
- Publication date: March 1944

"Deadline" is a 1944 science fiction short story by American writer Cleve Cartmill, first published in Astounding Science Fiction. The story described the then-secret atomic bomb in some detail. At that time the bomb was still under development and top secret, which prompted a visit by the FBI.

In 1943, Cartmill suggested to John W. Campbell, the then-editor of Astounding, that he could write a story about a futuristic super-bomb. Campbell liked the idea and supplied Cartmill with considerable background information gleaned from unclassified scientific journals, on the use of Uranium-235 to make a nuclear fission device. The resulting story appeared in an issue of Astounding, released in February 1944 but dated March of that year.

== FBI investigation ==
By March 8, the story had come to the attention of the Counterintelligence Corps, who saw many similarities between the technical details in the story and the research currently being undertaken in great secrecy at Los Alamos. Gregory Benford describes the incident as told to him by Edward Teller in his autobiographical essay "Old Legends":

Coming three years later in the same magazine, Cleve Cartmill's "Deadline" provoked astonishment in the lunch table discussions at Los Alamos. It really did describe isotope separation and the bomb itself in detail, and raised as its principal plot pivot the issue the physicists were then debating among themselves: should the Allies use it? To the physicists from many countries clustered in the high mountain strangeness of New Mexico, cut off from their familiar sources of humanist learning, it must have seemed particularly striking that Cartmill described an allied effort, a joint responsibility laid upon many nations.

Discussion of Cartmill's "Deadline" was significant. The story's detail was remarkable, its sentiments even more so. Did this rather obscure story hint at what the American public really thought about such a superweapon, or would think if they only knew?

Talk attracts attention, Teller recalled a security officer who took a decided interest, making notes, saying little. In retrospect, it was easy to see what a wartime intelligence monitor would make of the physicists' conversations. Who was this guy Cartmill, anyway? Where did he get these details? Who tipped him to the isotope separation problem? "and that is why Mr. Campbell received his visitors."

Fearing a security breach, the FBI began an investigation into Cartmill, Campbell, and some of their acquaintances including Isaac Asimov and Robert A. Heinlein.

== Critical evaluation ==
"Deadline" was described by Robert Silverberg as "a klutzy clunker" and by Cartmill himself as "that stinker". According to Silverberg, Cartmill also used the phrase "it stinks" when describing the story to a postman who was acting as an informer for military intelligence.

The story was included in the anthologies The Best of Science Fiction (1946; ed. Groff Conklin), Science Fiction of the Forties (1978; ed. Joseph Olander, Martin Harry Greenberg, and Frederik Pohl), The Golden Age of Science Fiction (1980; ed. Groff Conklin), and The Great Science Fiction Stories: Volume 6, 1944 (1981; ed. Isaac Asimov and Martin H. Greenberg).

== See also ==
- "The Paradise Crater" - atomic sci-fi story that led to author Philip Wylie being place under house arrest
