= Tarzan and the Lost City =

- Theatrical release poster
- Directed by: Carl Schenkel
- Written by: Bayard Johnson; J. Anderson Black
- Based on: Characters created by Edgar Rice Burroughs
- Produced by: Stanley S. Canter; Dieter Geissler; Michael Lake
- Starring: Casper Van Dien; Jane March; Steven Waddington
- Cinematography: Paul Gilpin
- Edited by: Harry Hitner
- Music by: Christopher Franke
- Production company: Village Roadshow Pictures
- Distributed by: Warner Bros.
- Release date: April 24, 1998
- Running time: 83 minutes
- Country: United States
- Language: English
- Budget: $20 million
- Box office: $2.2 million

Tarzan and the Lost City is a 1998 American adventure film directed by Carl Schenkel, written by Bayard Johnson and J. Anderson Black, and starring Casper Van Dien, Jane March, and Steven Waddington. The screenplay by Bayard Johnson and J. Anderson Black is loosely based on the Tarzan stories by Edgar Rice Burroughs. The film received largely negative reviews and was a box-office bomb.

One of the film's producers, Stanley S. Canter, had previously produced another Tarzan film for Warner Bros. Pictures, Greystoke: The Legend of Tarzan, Lord of the Apes (1984).

== Plot ==
In 1913 on the night before Jane Porter's wedding to John Clayton II (also known as Tarzan, who is something of a celebrity), her bridegroom receives a disturbing vision of his childhood homeland in peril. The educated explorer and treasure seeker Nigel Ravens is seeking the legendary city of Opar to plunder its ancient treasures and uncover dangerous powers. Much to Jane's distress and confusion, Clayton leaves for Africa to help, meeting up with the shaman Mugambe whose village was plundered by Ravens' group to find a key to Opar.

Tarzan negotiates with Ravens to abandon the effort, but Jane arrives to be with her fiancé. While glad to see her, Tarzan must now protect her while trying to stop Ravens and his men from continuing their expedition.

== Cast ==
- Casper Van Dien as John Clayton/Tarzan
- Jane March as Jane Porter
- Steven Waddington as Nigel Ravens
- Winston Ntshona as Mugambe
- Rapulana Seiphemo as Kaya
- Ian Roberts as Captain Dooley
- Sean Taylor as Wilkes
- Gys De Villiers as Schiller

== Production ==
The film was shot in Bethlehem, Free State and Port Edward, KwaZulu-Natal South Africa.

German composer Christopher Franke composed the original musical score.

== Reception ==
The film received mainly negative reviews, criticizing the low budget production values, effects and writing. On review aggregator Rotten Tomatoes it has an approval rating of 6% based on reviews from 18 critics.

A rare positive review came from The New York Times, where critic Lawrence Van Gelder declared the film "A throwback to the days of Saturday afternoon adventures in exotic locales that were usually Hollywood back lots" and that it "zips along, past the ritual lions, elephants and cobras to the city of Opar and its temple of illusions, tunnels and traps, and right to the inevitable satisfying showdown."

=== Box office ===
The film opened in the same weekend as The Big Hit and grossed $1 million in 12th place. It only took $2 million at the box office, making it a commercial failure.
