= And Having Writ... =

1978 novel by Donald R. Bensen

- First edition
- Author: Donald R. Bensen
- Language: English
- Genre: Science fiction, Alternate history
- Publisher: Bobbs-Merrill
- Publication date: July 1978
- Publication place: United States
- Media type: Print (hardback & paperback)
- Pages: 250 (first edition, hardback)
- ISBN: 0-672-52078-8 (first edition, hardback)
- OCLC: 3870456
- Dewey Decimal: 813/.5/4
- LC Class: PZ4.B4739 An PS3552.E54765

And Having Writ... is a 1978 science fiction/alternate history novel by American writer Donald R. Bensen. Nominated for the 1979 John W. Campbell Award, it tells the story of aliens who crash-land on Earth in 1908 and then journey around the planet, trying to jump-start World War I. Even though they fail to do this, they succeed in creating the circumstances for their ultimate departure from Earth after a period of suspended animation.

== Plot summary ==
According to the novel, the Siberian explosion was originally caused by the crash landing of the spacecraft named The Wanderer. In this alternate reality, however, the alien astronauts are able to commandeer their failing vessel so that it lands in the Pacific Ocean, just outside San Francisco.

Shortly after landing, the quartet of spacemen are rescued from the sea by an American ship and taken to California. The Wanderer sinks into the ocean, and the team reasons that they must find a way to accelerate Earth's technological advances so that they can get back home. The eventual conclusion at which they arrive is that they must provoke the planet into what Ari claims is an inevitable global conflict, one that will (through weaponry innovations) result in a boom of new science and industry.

== Characters ==
=== The astronauts and their roles ===
The four astronauts never identify their home world, merely saying that they are a team of Explorers sent to gather information about foreign planets.

- Raf: The main character of the book, Raf tells the story in first person. He is a Recorder, and is responsible for ensuring that every detail of the expedition is written down. Raf is quite detached in his observations and seems to be fairly optimistic. While on Earth, he develops a strong taste for alcoholic beverages.
- Ari: Ari is a Metahistorian, which seems to signify a study of universal historical trends among people of different galaxies and solar systems. His has a tendency to be very long-winded and often clashes with Dark.
- Valmis: Valmis is an Integrator. This is a rather obscure occupation that somehow involves interpreting the "Patterns" of the universe, of civilizations, of individual people, of anything and everything. Valmis is very mystical and often frustrates his crew-mates, particularly Dark.
- Dark: Dark is the Captain of The Wanderer and as such is an expert in all things mechanical. He is practical to a fault and is ceaselessly annoyed by what he sees as the meaningless ramblings of Valmis and Ari.

=== Historical characters ===
The astronauts interact with a number of important global personages during their stay on Earth.

- Theodore Roosevelt: In the book, Theodore Roosevelt becomes the 26th President of the United States in 1901 after William McKinley is assassinated. He is elected to a full term in 1904. He is elected as the 28th President in 1912 and reelected in 1916 and serves until 1921. Roosevelt was the first major world leader with whom the spacemen acquaint themselves, and acts as a benevolent and friendly presence. In the book, he is quoted as saying that if he could only take back his promise not to run for reelection in 1908, he would cut off his right hand.
  “If I hadn’t promised not to run again...by George, I’d cut my hand off to here!”
  Roosevelt helps the aliens to escape house arrest in New York in 1909. In 1925, while he is attending a demonstration of an experimental Moon rocket, Roosevelt is killed when the device's engines explode and destroy the platform he was on.
- J. P. Morgan: Mr. Morgan, the industrial titan of the Gilded Age, makes a brief appearance at the very beginning of the book, in 1908. He is concerned that the revelation that aliens exist will turn the U.S. financial markets asunder, and he works with President Roosevelt through the U.S. Treasury Department to ensure that the economy is unshaken by the news.
- William Howard Taft: Secretary of War William Howard Taft, who in reality served as the 27th President from 1909 to 1913 and then became a Supreme Court Justice, appears very briefly at the beginning of the book. His one and only cameo comes in 1908, when he and Theodore Roosevelt are discussing the effects that the presence of extraterrestrials could have on the election. He is asked by the Republican National Committee to relinquish their nomination for president, news that overjoys President Roosevelt, who assumes that he will be the new nominee. It is Taft who delivers the startling news that the Committee plans to nominate Thomas Alva Edison.
- Thomas Edison: In the book, Thomas Alva Edison also arrives at the White House in 1908, chiefly to interview the aliens and learn about their technology, which fascinates him. The aliens are able to create an effective hearing aid for Edison to help him with his poor hearing. When word of the spacemen goes public, the Republican Party bounces William Howard Taft as their 1908 nominee, reasoning that only a man as brilliant as Edison would be able to steer America through such incredible new times.
  In 1909, Edison has the aliens placed under house arrest in New York so that he can pry technological secrets from them. They escape (thanks to former president Roosevelt), however, and head to Europe, and Edison is obliged to dispatch Marines to go after them. When he finally has them in his clutches again, President Edison realizes that the amount of technology the aliens possess would, if widely distributed, cause widespread upheaval.
  "Nearly free power for everyone, available tomorrow, ain’t that grand? No need to buy coal, gasoline, oil, wood, anything like that. And no need to pay the coal miners, oil people, filling stations, anybody like that. I calculate it’d take about six weeks for the country to turn into a howling wilderness of starving mobs...We’re an industrious and inventive people, and I don’t see any easy gifts you could let us have be worth losing that."
  In 1912, Edison decides not to run for reelection, and rather goes back to inventing.
- H. G. Wells: The famous science fiction writer acts as an escort for the extraterrestrials, summoned to learn about their culture and distribute the news of their coming. He becomes one of their closest companions.
- George M. Cohan: The aliens befriend the famous songwriter and performer during their stay in New York.
- King Edward VII: King of the United Kingdom since 1901. After escaping the United States, the aliens head to France in 1909, where they are to have an audience with King Edward VII regarding the inevitability of a coming world war.
  Raf, in wondering why the King of England should be in France, notes, "The King, it appeared, made a habit of leaving his country for substantial periods of time, especially during the uncertain weather of late winter and early spring, which he spent in France, but also in summer and autumn.
  His subjects, far from resenting this, were gratified, as most of them would themselves have preferred to be elsewhere much of the time, and so took a prideful vicarious pleasure in their monarch’s travels."
  In meeting with Edward, the Explorers demonstrate their stunning lack of tact, having not yet become accustomed to human social norms.
  When he hears of the widespread destruction and misery that World War I will bring, Edward is upset.
  "'If it must be, so it must. God grant I do not live to see it.'
  "'That's about an even chance,' Ari said, looking at him appraisingly. 'If you were to get at it pretty quickly...you'd probably see it pretty well launched. If you and your fellow kings just let things drag on another couple of years or so, why, I'd have to agree you'd probably be pretty well out of it.'"
  Edward nearly dies right in front of the Explorers, and they are obliged to revive him using their highly advanced medical technology, thus restoring him to full health as he has not enjoyed since young manhood. Out of gratitude, Edward shields them from the U.S. Marines seeking to arrest them and sees to it that they make it safely to Berlin.
- Kaiser Wilhelm II of Germany: Emperor of Germany. After leaving France, the Explorers head to the Imperial Palace in Berlin, where they are received by Wilhelm II. When the team tries to tell him about the coming World War, he is incredulous, insisting that such a conflict is impossible due to the sheer military might of his empire. He, like his uncle Edward VII, is humbled by the alien visitors’ complete and uninhibited honesty. After Wilhelm states that Germans believe a healthy body houses a healthy mind, Dark questions, "'Look here. That healthy body business—how does that square with that arm of yours?'"
  The Kaiser's left arm had been pulled from its socket at birth as a result of his Breech birth that caused Erb's palsy, the topic was an extremely sensitive one for him. As a child, he was forced by cruel tutors to learn to ride horseback without any assistance whatsoever. They would watch callously as the young crown prince fell from his steed, never once making a move to come to his aid. Wilhelm consequently developed an extremely bellicose personality, one that, in the real world, contributed to the outbreak of World War I.
  When the Kaiser hears Dark's remark regarding his arm, he is so furious that he attempts to attack the alien with his ceremonial sword. This merely results in Wilhelm falling to the ground and being unable to get up. Dark, completely oblivious to the fact that he is responsible for the episode, extends his arm towards the emperor, saying compassionately, "'Here, let me give you a hand, as you've only got one that's of any use to you.'"
  The Kaiser forgives Dark's insolence, however, when the spaceman repairs his shriveled limb so that it is in good working order. When the Explorers leave Berlin, their human companions are shocked to see Kaiser Wilhelm waving at them with two healthy arms. The Kaiser gets the troupe on a train to St. Petersburg first thing, so that they might conference with his cousin, Czar Nicholas II.
- Czar Nicholas II of Russia: When the Explorers first meet Czar Nicholas at Tsarskoe Selo, the Imperial palace outside of St. Petersburg, he is timid and unwilling to accept the reality of what they are telling him. He protests that he already has enough trouble on his hands without this new burden, and that "it's all too much for me."
  When the Czar's son, five-year-old Tsarevich Alexei, walks right into the room, Nicholas softly objects, "Alexei, you know you're not supposed to come in here while Papa is doing business."
  Nicholas is just about to dismiss his visitors when Alexei falls and strikes his head on the desk. Nicholas immediately leaps up, cradling his son and screaming frantically for "Grigori!"
  The Czar tearfully lays his son on the couch until the filthy monk Grigori Rasputin enters the room, chants over the suffering child, and leaves. Alexei is calm after this, and is taken back to the children's quarters.
  The Czar is deeply shaken by the incident, and begins to discuss the czarevitch's illness with the Explorers.
  Valmis, usually withdrawn and ethereal, says that the only thing afflicting the boy is a bad set of Patterns.
  Valmis analyses some of Alexei's blood and finds that a certain protein is missing. He then views the Czar's blood, finds the necessary protein, and is able to reproduce it using machinery of Dark's. A sample of this new blood is injected into the czarevitch, who is completely cured within three days.
  There is nationwide rejoicing at this news in Russia, and, the very day of Alexei's recovery, Rasputin is dragged from the Palace by Imperial soldiers.
  Czar Nicholas is so boundlessly thankful that he arranges safe passage to Spain for the Explorers, who are still being pursued by Marines.
  In addition, the Czar promises to seriously consider everything that Ari has told him about the possibility of a World War. Nicholas II would remain the Russian Czar until his death between 1918 and 1933 and would be succeeded by his son Alexi.
- Grigori Rasputin: With the Czarevitch cured, Rasputin has no further use at the Imperial court and was thrown out of the palace by Imperial soldiers. He eventually makes his way to New York City and becomes successful in the advertising and film industries.
- Czarevitch Alexei Nicholaevitch Romanov: In the book, young Czarevitch Alexei of Russia is cured of his Haemophilia by the visiting aliens in 1909. Following his father's death between 1918 and 1933, he became the Czar of Russia. During their 1933 tour of Earth, which they undertake just prior to their departure from the planet, the Explorers are received by Alexei, who is now the Czar of Russia. During the encounter, Raf describes him as a "strapping young lad." In reality, of course, Czarevitch Alexei was murdered, along with the rest of his family, by Bolshevik revolutionaries in 1918, when he was only thirteen years old.

== Literary significance and criticism ==
"a smoothly humorous sf novel set in an alternate world engendered by the survival of the aliens whose crash-landing caused the Siberian Tunguska explosion of 1908. Thomas Alva Edison and H.G. Wells make appearances (John Clute/Encyclopedia of SF).

== Background ==
The actual Tunguska Event was a massive explosion in Siberia, in June 1908. The explosion, unexplained even today, felled sixty million trees and produced shockwaves that could be felt four hundred miles away. A popular explanation is that a small comet disintegrated just before impact; conspiracy theorists have more fanciful explanations.

== Release details ==
- 1978, USA, Bobbs-Merrill (ISBN 0-672-52078-8), Pub date ? ? 1978, hardback (First edition)
- 1979, USA, Ace Books (ISBN 044102274X), Pub date ? March 1979, paperback
