= The Purple Pterodactyls =

1980 collection of short stories by L. Sprague de Camp

- Dust-jacket for The Purple Pterodactyls
- Author: L. Sprague de Camp
- Cover artist: Václav Vaca
- Language: English
- Genre: Fantasy
- Publisher: Phantasia Press
- Publication date: January 1980
- Publication place: United States
- Media type: Print (hardback)
- Pages: 228 pp
- ISBN: 0-932096-02-6
- OCLC: 5913161
- Dewey Decimal: 919.8/9 19
- LC Class: PS3507.E2344 P8

The Purple Pterodactyls is a collection of fantasy short stories by American writer L. Sprague de Camp. The collection was first published in hardcover by Phantasia Press in January, 1980, and in paperback by Ace Books in April of the same year. It has also been translated into German. An e-book edition was published by Gollancz's SF Gateway imprint on September 29, 2011 as part of a general release of de Camp's works in electronic form. The pieces were originally published between 1975 and 1979 in the magazines The Magazine of Fantasy & Science Fiction, Fantastic, Escape!, and Fantasy Crossroads.

== Summary ==
The book collects the author's fifteen tales of ensorcelled financier W. Wilson Newbury, an ordinary man continually encountering extraordinary situations. His French wife Denise also appears in most of the tales. Two stories ("Balsamo's Mirror" and "Far Babylon") feature characters recognizable as real-life authors H. P. Lovecraft and Robert E. Howard, though neither is actually named.

== Contents ==
- "Balsamo's Mirror." In fulfillment of a wish to live in an earlier time, a magic mirror transfers the minds of Willy and an unnamed friend from Providence (H. P. Lovecraft) to the bodies of a pair of 18th-century English peasant poachers in a disillusioning adventure.
- "The Lamp." A luckless friend of Willy's attempts to resuscitate his fortunes by invoking an ancient Atlantian deity, forgetful of the fate of its ancient worshipers.
- "Algy." A hoax involving a legendary lake monster in the Adirondacks comes undone when the real thing intervenes.
- "The Menhir." Willy and his French wife get involved in a spooky adventure connected with ancient megaliths in her native country.
- "Darius." In a visit to the Adirondacks, Willy discovers a temperamental horse is the reincarnation of Henri Michod, a lumber mill hand he knew in his youth.
- "United Imp." Willy investigates a company to which his bank is contemplating making a loan, only to find it plagued by some unusual union troubles.
- "Tiki." Concerning giant spider crabs and an enraged Polynesian god.
- "Far Babylon." In Texas, Willy encounters a melancholy poet grieving over lost opportunities; afterwards he realizes it was the ghost of a writing colleague (Robert E. Howard) of his Providence friend.
- "The Yellow Man". Willy is up against voodoo and black magic this time.
- "A Sending of Serpents." Willy finds himself in the middle of a contest between a pair of religious cult leaders.
- "The Huns." In another case of reincarnation, involving Hitler and a motorcycle gang, Willy is aided by Indian shamans Virgil Hathaway and Charlie Catfish.
- "The Purple Pterodactyls." A carnival concession turns out to be run by a jinn who hates to lose, resulting in an escalation of perils for Willy.
- "Dead Man's Chest." A pirate burial may involve other things than treasure.
- "The Figurine." In which it is shown that gods, however minor, can have their own wills and agendas.
- "Priapus." A California sex cult attempting to invoke a lascivious ancient Roman god gets the ritual disastrously wrong.

== Relation to other works ==
In two of the stories ("Darius" and "The Huns") de Camp reuses the characters of Henri Michod, Virgil Hathaway and Charlie Catfish, who originally appeared in his early stories "The Hardwood Pile" (1940) and "The Reluctant Shaman" (1947), set in the fictional town of Gahato in upstate New York.

A sixteenth story of Newbury, "The Ensorcelled ATM", authored by Michael F. Flynn, appeared in Harry Turtledove's 2005 tribute anthology honoring L. Sprague de Camp, The Enchanter Completed. It ties Newbury's adventures in with the classic "Gavagan's Bar" fantasies written by de Camp in collaboration with Fletcher Pratt.

== Reception ==
Reviewers generally rate the collection pleasant but minor de Camp.

Kirkus Reviews calls the protagonist "one of Sprague de Camp's more successful heroes, ... a kind of John Putnam Thatcher of the occult." After singling out "Balsamo's Mirror," "Priapus", "A Sending of Serpents," United Imp," and "Tiki" for comment, it notes that the "handful of somewhat more strongly linked stories in the series, set in Adirondack summer-home country, pleasantly conjure up the attractions of that region." But "[t]here's really nothing very much to any of these offerings except amiable pacing and a sense of when to stop, but de Camp makes those virtues go a long way."

Publishers' Weekly notes "Such contemporary fantasy bonbons are pleasant, light amusement that would have been at home in the pages of the lamented Unknown magazine. If they are minor de Camp and the literary equivalent of empty calories, so what? They do what they were made for—especially when they aren't gorged on but rather are enjoyed one by one as the mood strikes."

Brian M. Stableford, comparing the stories to the earlier Tales from Gavagan's Bar by de Camp and Fletcher Pratt, rates the latter "good examples of their kind and ... more successful than de Camp's recent series of stories of a similar stripe collected in The Purple Pterodactyls."

Don D'Ammassa called the book "a collection of ... light short fantasies with a common character, none of which are individually significant, although the whole is greater than the sum of its parts."

David Langford, also referring to the stories as "in the Unknown vein," is generally unimpressed. Citing the author's promise that the tales are "occasionally frightening, always amusing and sometimes unforgettable," Langford demurs, calling them "occasionally amusing but not very." He does note that he "liked the one with a sex-cult trying to call up Priapus but, through sheer ineptitude at Latin incantation, getting a highly unamused Diana instead."
