= Mona Farnsworth =

American writer

- Born: March 31, 1897
- Died: September 1, 1984 (aged 87); Sarasota
- Spouse(s): Reginald Grant Barrow

Muriel Ives Newhall (June 8, 1904 – July 1981) was an American writer who wrote primarily under the penname Mona Farnsworth. She was a prolific writer of stories for pulp magazines and wrote a series of gothic novels.

She was born Muriel Ives on June 8, 1904, the daughter of Howard Colby Ives, a Unitarian minister who became an early adherent of the Baháʼí faith in the United States, and his first wife, Beth Hoyt.

In the late 1930s she was probably the most frequent contributor to Romantic Range, a Western romance pulp magazine, sometimes contributing as many as three stories an issue using different pseudonyms. Her most memorable creation was the Sherriff Minnie, a middle-aged woman who fought for the law in men's clothing and fended off her frequent suitor, Peter Whittlesley.

She also contributed a number of stories to the first two years of Unknown, John W. Campbell's science fiction pulp magazine: "Who Wants Power?" (a pastiche of Edgar Allan Poe's "Some Words with a Mummy"), "Whatever", "The Joker", "All Roads", and "Are You There?" Campbell selected "All Roads" to represent Unknown in the Sam Moskowitz anthology Editor's Choice in Science Fiction (1954).

== Personal life ==
In 1933, she married the Rev. Reginald Grant Barrow, Bishop of the African Orthodox Church. They had a son, Reginald Grant Barrow. With his first wife, Bishop Barrow was the father of Errol Barrow, the first prime minister of Barbados.

== Bibliography ==
- House of Deadly Calm. Apollo, 1970
- Ransom Castle. Apollo, 1970.
- Companion to Evil. New York: Ace, 1971.
- The House of Whispering Death. Apollo, 1971.
- The Great Stone Heart. New York: Pinnacle, 1971.
- A Cross for Tomorrow. New York: Pinnacle Books, 1972.
- Death by the Zodiac. Award, 1972.
- The Three Sisters of No End House. Ace, 1972.
- The Evil That Waited. Pinnacle, 1973.
- The Starcrossed Road. Pinnacle, 1973.
- The Menace of Marble Hill. Manor, 1974.
- The Castle That Whispered. Award, 1976.
- Dark Wood. Award, 1976.
- Footsteps That Follow. Manor, 1976.
