= Cleve Cartmill =

American journalist

- Born: June 21, 1908; Platteville, Wisconsin
- Died: February 11, 1964 (aged 55); Orange County, California

Cleve Cartmill at the 1958 Worldcon (Solacon)

Cleve Cartmill (June 21, 1908 in Platteville, Wisconsin – February 11, 1964 in Orange County, California) was an American writer of science fiction and fantasy short stories. He is best remembered for what is sometimes referred to as "the Cleve Cartmill affair", when his 1944 story "Deadline" attracted the attention of the FBI by reason of its detailed description of a nuclear weapon similar to that being developed by the highly classified Manhattan Project.

== Biography ==
Born in Wisconsin, Cartmill attended Webb City High School in Missouri before moving out to California with his parents. Before embarking on his career as a writer for pulp magazines, Cartmill had a wide number of jobs including newspaperman, radio operator and accountant, as well as, ironically, a short spell at the American Radium Products Company. In the 1940 census he lists his profession as copy desk man in a newspaper office. Around this time he joined the informal writing club that met at Robert Heinlein's house, the "Mañana Literary Society." His friends Anthony Boucher and Roby Wentz, whom he had met in 1934 when they were all on the staff of the United Progressive News, a local Los Angeles political tabloid, were also regular attendees at the weekly gatherings of Mañana. Heinlein provided him with an introduction to John W. Campbell, and subsequently many of his earliest stories, from 1941 onwards, were published in Campbell's magazines Unknown and Astounding Science Fiction. This was at the start of World War II, when Campbell found himself short of material because many of his regular writers were away on military service, from which Cartmill, who had suffered polio as a child and had a withered leg, was exempt for medical reasons. Cartmill spent most of World War II as a rewrite man on the Los Angeles Daily News, where he worked alongside Nieson Himmel and Roby Wentz. After the war he worked at the San Diego Journal.

== Writing career ==
Cartmill's writing career was undistinguished but competent. In his book A Requiem for Astounding, Alva Rogers expresses the opinion that "Cartmill wrote with an easy and colloquial fluidity that made his stories eminently readable". In Fred Smith's history of Unknown Worlds, Smith praises several of Cartmill's dark fantasy stories such as "No Graven Image", "The Bargain" and "Hell Hath Fury", describing them as "original and entertaining". Cartmill's Unknown stories, like others appearing in that publication, tend to be either humorous tales or horror stories. They deal with concepts such as ghouls, demons and Death.

After the war he was an uncredited ghostwriter on several mystery novels by Los Angeles-based writers, including books by Craig Rice, Gypsy Rose Lee, and George Sanders, as well as a couple of the Leslie Charteris "Saint" stories.

Outside his writing career Cartmill claimed to be best known, at the time, for being the co-inventor of the Blackmill system of high speed typography.

During the course of his life Cartmill was married three times. In 1941 he married Jeanne Ruth Irvine. In 1948 he married Vida Jameson (1916–1988), the daughter of science fiction writer Malcolm Jameson. Alfred Bester mentions meeting her in the company of her father before the war: "Now and then he brought along his pretty daughter, who turned everybody's head.". His final marriage, in 1954, was to Ingrid Asting.

His son, Matt Cartmill (b. 1943) is a professor of Biological Anthropology at Boston University and a science writer to whom Heinlein partly dedicated his 1947 book Rocket Ship Galileo.

== Bibliography ==
=== Short stories ===
- Oscar, Unknown Worlds (February 1941)
- Deadline, Astounding Science Fiction (March 1944)
- No Graven Image
- The Bargain
- Hell Hath Fury
- You Can't Say That, New Tales of Space and Time (1951)

=== Books ===
- The Space Scavengers (Major 1975).
- Prelude to Armageddon (Darkside Press, 2003). Edited and introduced by John Pelan.
