= Babette Rosmond =

American author

- Rosmond in 1964
- Born: November 4, 1917
- Died: October 23, 1997 (aged 79)
- Other names: Rosamond Campion
- Occupation(s): Author, editor

Babette Rosmond (November 4, 1917 – October 23, 1997) was an American author.

== Biography ==
=== Career ===
Rosmond sold her first short story to The New Yorker at age seventeen. She published short fiction of her own and with Leonard M. Lake. She worked as an editor at the magazine publisher Street & Smith, editing two of their most famous pulp magazines, Doc Savage (from 1944 to 1948) and The Shadow (from 1946 to 1948). Fellow Street & Smith editor John W. Campbell, the science fiction editor, published Rosmond's sf debut, a story co-written by Lake called "Are You Run-Down, Tired-," in the October 1942 issue of Unknown Worlds and included her story "One Man's Harp" from the August 1943 issue in From Unknown Worlds (1948), an anthology of the best stories from that magazine.

Rosmond set her debut novel, The Dewy Dewy Eyes (1946), in the world of pulp magazine publishing, featuring a heroine fresh out of college and an editor-in-chief who plans a new glossy paper publication. Her second novel, A Party for Grown-Ups (1948), was about an affair between a married doctor and a wealthy divorcee. Lucy, or the Delaware Dialogues (1952) was about infighting amongst the suburban Delaware family. She also wrote The Children: A Comedy for Grown-Ups (1956), The Lawyers (1962), Error Hurled (1976), and Monarch (1978). She published the satirical novel Diary of a Candid Lady (1964) under the name Francis M. Arroway.

She served as fiction editor of Today's Family (from 1952 to 1953) then worked at Better Living (from 1953 to 1956), and Seventeen (from 1957 to 1975). At Seventeen she was fiction editor and edited a series of anthologies of fiction published in the magazine: Seventeen's Stories (1958), Seventeen from Seventeen (1967), Seventeen Book of Prize Stories (1968), and Today's Stories from Seventeen (1971).

With actor Henry Morgan she published a collection of the work of humorist Ring Lardner, Shut Up, He Explained: A Ring Lardner Selection (1962). She also wrote a well-received biography of author and humorist Robert Benchley, whom she had met as a teenager, Robert Benchley: His Life and Good Times (1970).

=== Personal life ===
In 1944, she married lawyer Henry Stone, brother of Louis Stone of the brokerage firm Haydn Stone, and uncle of director Oliver Stone. They would be married for the rest of her life and they had two children, one of whom is the writer Gene Stone, the other is James Stone, founder, CEO and Chairman of The Plymouth Rock Assurance Corporation.

=== Activism ===
In the 1970s, Rosmond became an important early activist against traditional treatments for breast cancer. In February 1971 she found an olive-sized lump in her breast and was diagnosed with breast cancer. The traditional treatment was a radical mastectomy, which required removal of the entire breast as well as surrounding tissue, muscle, and lymph nodes. Two of her friends had that procedure and reported being unhappy with their choice and the resulting side effects. In response to her refusal to undergo a radical mastectomy, her doctor was condescending and insulting and told her she would be dead within three weeks. Through an article in McCall's by Dr. William A. Nolen she learned about Dr. George Crile, Jr. at the Cleveland Clinic. Crile was a leading advocate in the United States for procedures that removed much less material, a simple mastectomy, which only removes the breast, and a lumpectomy, which removes only a small amount of tissue. Then extremely controversial, these treatments are now standard instead of using a radical mastectomy in all cases. Crile performed a successful lumpectomy on Rosmond and her cancer did not reappear until the late 1990s. She said "I think what I did was the highest level of women's liberation. I said 'No' to a group of doctors who told me, 'You must sign this paper, you don't have to know what it's all about.'"

Under the name Rosamond Campion, she began writing about her experiences. Her article in the February 1972 issue of McCall's, "The Right to Choose", generated more mail than any article in that publication's history. Some 80 percent of the mail was in support of her decision and many of the letters were from women who asked how to contact Dr. Crile, whose name she had withheld at his request. She told her story in a book, The Invisible Worm (1972), which takes its title from the poem "The Sick Rose" by William Blake. She appeared on a number of television programs, including a 1973 episode of The David Susskind Show where she and Crile debated two surgeons and two breast cancer survivors all opposed to her position. Public activism like Rosamond's caused a drastic transformation in how patients and doctors interacted regarding breast cancer and prompted a growing rejection of more radical procedures in favor of more informed decision making by the patient.

=== Death ===
Rosmond died in 1997. Her breast cancer never recurred.
