= Flight to Opar =

1976 novel by Philip José Farmer

- Cover illustration of Flight to Opar
- Author: Philip José Farmer
- Cover artist: Roy Krenkel
- Language: English
- Series: Opar series
- Genre: Fantasy
- Publisher: DAW Books
- Publication date: 1976
- Publication place: United States
- Media type: Print (paperback)
- Pages: 212 pp.
- Preceded by: Hadon of Ancient Opar
- Followed by: The Song of Kwasin

Flight to Opar is a fantasy novel by American writer Philip José Farmer, first published in paperback by DAW Books in June 1976, and reprinted twice through 1983. The first British edition was published by Magnum in 1977; it was reprinted by Methuen in 1983. It was later gathered together with a preceding novel, Hadon of Ancient Opar, and a sequel, The Song of Kwasin, into the omnibus collection Gods of Opar: Tales of Lost Khokarsa (2012). The work has also been translated into French. It and the other books in the series purport to fill in some of the ancient prehistory of the lost city of Opar, created by Edgar Rice Burroughs as a setting for his Tarzan series.

== Plot ==
In this continuation of Hadon's adventures in the ancient Africa of 12,000 years ago, the last-ditch defense of the High Priestess he and his allies mounted against the tyrannical King's evil schemes segues into a perilous chase through various exotic cities, seas and islands. Hadon undertakes to take his mate, now pregnant with his child, to safety at his native city of Opar, but is pursued by members of a dark cult in the service of the king.

The book ends as the war just gets seriously going, and with only tantalizing glimpses given of various interesting locations. Hadon's beloved clearly appears destined to a crucial future role which is never quite reached. Plainly, Farmer provided for further sequels which were never written. He has stated that he intended to have Hadon's son emigrate to the south in the wake of the catastrophe that would ultimately destroy the Khokarsan civilization in which the series is set, there to found the city of Kor that would afterward become the setting of H. Rider Haggard's fantasy novel She.

== See also ==
- Khokarsa
- Opar
