= Science Fiction Foundation =

UK charity

- Founded: 1970
- Location: United Kingdom
- Official language: International
- Website: www.sf-foundation.org

The Science Fiction Foundation is a registered charity established 1970 in England by George Hay and others. Its purpose is to "promote science fiction and bring together those who read, write, study, teach, research or archive science fiction in Britain and the rest of the world." Science fiction writers Arthur C. Clarke and Ursula K. Le Guin were founding patrons; current patrons include Nalo Hopkinson and Professor David Southwood.

Until 1995, the SFF was based in the North East London Polytechnic in Barking, Essex, UK (now the University of East London). For much of this period the Director of the Foundation was Malcolm Edwards, who later moved to Gollancz, and then Orion.

== Activities ==
SFF publishes the journal Foundation: The International Review of Science Fiction three times a year and occasional critical works under the general title Foundation Studies in Science Fiction. It owns and supports the Science Fiction Foundation Collection, the largest research library of its type in Europe, and currently one of the special collections at the Sydney Jones Library of the University of Liverpool. The SFF provides a scientific speaker for the annual Eastercon, under the general title of the George Hay Memorial Lecture. It also supplies two judges for the annual Arthur C. Clarke Award. The SFF and the British Science Fiction Association hold their annual general meetings jointly in either May or June.
