= Don Bensen =

American novelist

- Born: Donald Roynald Bensen; October 3, 1927; Brooklyn, New York
- Died: October 19, 1997 (aged 70); Croton-on-Hudson, New York
- Occupations: Editor, author
- Writing career
- Notable work: And Having Writ...

Donald Roynald Bensen (October 3, 1927 – October 19, 1997), known also as Don Bensen and listed sometimes as D.R. Bensen, was an American editor and science fiction writer. As an editor he is known best for editing works of P. G. Wodehouse and his involvement with their re-issue as paperbacks in the United States. As an author, he is known best for his 1978 humorous alternate history novel, And Having Writ..., published first by Bobbs-Merrill company.

== Life ==
Bensen died at age 70 at his home in Croton-on-Hudson, New York on October 19, 1997.

== Career ==
Bensen's literary career began as a literary agent for Scott Meredith company. He was appointed editor of Pyramid Publications during 1957, and was eventually, if not immediately, editor-in-chief there. Later he was a senior editor for Ballantine Books and afterwards the Berkley Publishing Corporation of New York. He was a consulting editor for Dell Books and The Dial Press from 1976 until 1981, and was instrumental in the establishment and acquisition of titles for the joint venture between the two imprints for their Quantum Science Fiction series, a prestigious international trade name that included such major works as Stardance by Spider and Jeanne Robinson, the seminal story collection The Persistence of Vision by John Varley, In the Ocean of Night by Gregory Benford and The Snow Queen by Joan D. Vinge. He also contributed editorially to Dell's paperback science fiction and fantasy publications during those years. During 1983 he joined Keats Publishing, where he also became editor-in-chief.

As an author, Bensen was the author of the novel And Having Writ..., the "Tracker" western novels, and a number of other books. He also wrote a number of media related novels, including works based on the Gunsmoke television series, and novelizations of William Goldman's screenplays for the 1979 movies Mr. Horn and Butch and Sundance: The Early Days.

Bensen was a member of the all-male literary banqueting club the Trap Door Spiders, which served as the basis of Isaac Asimov's fictional group of mystery solvers the Black Widowers. Bensen himself was the model for the character Roger Halsted.

Concerning the Black Widowers, he published a poem of the same name during 1977. He was also associated with the Mystery Writers of America.

== Bibliography ==
- And Having Writ... (1978)
- William Goldman's Mr. Horn (New York, Dell Publishing, 1978) Novelization of the CBS miniseries Mr. Horn, ISBN 9780440151944
- William Goldman's Mr. Horn (London, Coronet Books, 1979) Novelization of the CBS miniseries Mr. Horn, ISBN 0 340 24652 9
- Butch and Sundance : The Early Days (1979)
- A Wodehouse Bestiary (with P.G. Wodehouse) (1985)
- Biblical Limericks: Old Testament Stories Re-Versed (1986)
- If I Were You (with P.G. Wodehouse) (1989)
- Plum's Peaches: Women in Wodehouse (with P.G. Wodehouse) (1991)
- Wodehouse on Crime: A Dozen Tales of Fiendish Cunning (with P.G. Wodehouse) (1991)
- Fore!: The Best of Wodehouse on Golf (with P.G. Wodehouse) (1999)

=== Tracker series ===
- Mask of the Tracker (1992)
- Fool's Gold (1992)
- Death in the Hills (1992)
- The Renegade (1992)
- Rawhide Moon (1993)
- Deathwind (1993)
- Final Mask (1993)

=== Anthologies ===
- The Unknown (1963)
- The Unknown Five (1964)
