= Foundation (journal) =

Peer-reviewed literary journal

- Discipline: Science fiction studies
- Language: English
- Edited by: Paul March-Russell

Publication details
- History: 1972–present
- Publisher: Science Fiction Foundation (England)
- Frequency: Triannually

Standard abbreviations
- ISO 4: Foundation

Indexing
- ISSN: 0306-4964
- LCCN: 79644907
- OCLC no.: 470148578

Links
- Journal homepage; Online archive

Foundation: The International Review of Science Fiction is a critical peer-reviewed literary journal established in 1972 that publishes articles and reviews about science fiction. It is published triannually (spring, summer, and winter) by the Science Fiction Foundation. The Encyclopedia of Science Fiction has called it "perhaps the liveliest and indeed the most critical of the big three critical journals" (the others being Extrapolation and Science Fiction Studies). A long-running feature was the series of interviews and autobiographical pieces with leading writers, entitled "The Profession of Science Fiction", a selection of which was edited and published by Macmillan Publishers in 1992. Several issues have been themed, including #93 (A Celebration of British Science Fiction, 2005), also published as part of the Foundation Studies in Science Fiction. The hundredth edition (Summer 2007) was unusual in that it was an all-fiction issue, including stories by such writers as Vandana Singh, Tricia Sullivan, Karen Traviss, Jon Courtenay Grimwood, John Kessel, Nalo Hopkinson, Greg Egan, and Una McCormack. Back issues of the journal are archived at the University of Liverpool's SF Hub whilst more recent issues can be found electronically via the database providers ProQuest.

== History ==
Foundation first appeared, sub-titled "The Review of Science Fiction", in March 1972 as the official publication of the SF Foundation, then based at North East London Polytechnic (now the University of East London). The journal embodied the SF Foundation's chief aim which was "to promote science fiction, and bring together those who read, write, study, teach, research or archive science fiction in Britain and the rest of the world." Since science fiction studies was then in its infancy as an academic subject, many of its early contributors were professional writers, editors and freelance critics, especially those associated with New Wave science fiction. Its long-running features editor, from #10 (1976) to #51 (1991), was Ian Watson (author) whilst its reviews editors have included John Clute (#20–47), Colin Greenland (#47–65) and Andy Sawyer (#65–129). This element, more rooted in the fan community than in academia, and allied to the journal's long-term commitment to reviewing fiction as well as non-fiction, can be seen as "partaking of 'certain traditions of fan scholarship'." With the appointment, however, of Edward James as editor in 1986, "a more academic tone" was introduced to the journal, which has endured under the current editorial team. Part of the journal's commitment to the academic study of science fiction is its annual essay prize, open to post-graduate students and early career researchers.

== List of editors ==
- Charles Barren, #1–4 (1972–73)
- Peter Nicholls, #5–13 (1973–78)
- Malcolm Edwards, #14–19 (1978–80)
- David Pringle, #20–36 (1980–86)
- Edward James, #37–83 (1986–2001)
- Farah Mendlesohn, #84–100 (2001–07)
- Graham Sleight, #101-15 (2007–13)
- Paul March-Russell, #116- (2013–present)
