= George Hay (writer) =

British sci-fi author

- Born: Oswyn Robert Tregonwell Hay Cohn; October 17, 1922; London
- Died: October 3, 1997 (aged 74); Sussex
- Occupation: Writer
- Writing career
- Pen name: George Hay
- Genre: Science fiction

Oswyn Robert Tregonwell Hay (17 October 1922 – 3 October 1997), better known by his working name George Hay, was a British science fiction author, editor, and critic. He is notable as a co-founder of the Science Fiction Foundation. He was a proponent of science fiction being seen as "mankind's distant-early-warning system", as it is the only genre in which, facing the long-term problems of history, can be addressed the question of "What to do next?" The primary role of science fiction, as Hay saw it, was "to educate us for that future". David Langford described his mindset towards science fiction as "partly an invaluable educational tool, partly as a neglected natural resource from which ideas could be mined."

== Biography ==
Hay was born Oswyn Robert Cohn in London in 1922. At the age of fourteen, Hay became an avid read of science fiction magazines such as Amazing Stories and Astounding Stories. "I used to sneak out of boarding school to come back with copies of Astounding hidden under my jacket," Hay later recalled.

As an adult, he was working for the Refuse Collection Department of Camden Borough Council when he wrote the first chapter and an outline of a novel, which he sent to Hamilton-Stafford. Editor Gordon Landsborough liked it, and told Hay to finish it. Hay received payment for the story, which he says immediately went all to rent. Throughout the 1950's, Hay would have ever novel he wrote - save one - published. Although he was British, Hay was heavily influenced in his writing by Americans such as John W. Campbell and, for a short while, L. Ron Hubbard. Hay later admitted that he felt like his work, while "no worse than some contemporary writing", lacked originality.

Hay turned to editing in the 1960's with the publication of Hell Hath Fury: An "Unknown" Anthology (1963). This was followed in 1970 with The Disappearing Future: A Symposium of Speculation, and Stopwatch: A Collection of International SF Stories in 1974. The latter included stories by well known science fiction names as John Brunner, Ursula K. Le Guin, Christopher Priest, and A.E. van Vogt. In 1978, Hay edited a hoax copy of The Necronomicon, working with David Langford, occultist Robert Turner, and Colin Wilson. (Turner would later edit a sequel in 1995.) Christopher Frayling, who also contributed to the work, was convinced to do so by Hay's friend Angela Carter. Langford was recruited because of his access to "heavyweight computer power at the Ministry of Defense", which he used to supposedly "to extract the occult text from alchemical ciphers created by Dr Dee in 1583". Although the anthology was meant as "a joke" and "a literary game played with the deadpan earnestness of Sherlockologists", it grew into a cult book, especially in foreign editions.

Starting in the late 1960's, Hay began to push for science fiction to be better promoted in the United Kingdom. In March 1970, Hay worked with Bram Stokes to organize SCICON '70, which was held in London's Royal Hotel. Critics said that the convention was "a washout" due to giving "too much time to fringe events" (including Scientology - see below), as well as "a bar that shut early." Peter Weston wrote, "This was the first con I have ever attended that didn't have anything to do with SF. Arthur C. Clarke turned up but wasn't even introduced let alone asked to speak!" Langford, while saying that some attendees "liked the novelty", said that the event was "an organizational disaster."

In 1971, Hay founded the Science Fiction Foundation at the North-East London Polytechnic. It was meant to promote and publicize the benefits of science fiction, and pursue the educational value of the genre. Leadership was organized around a council made up of science fiction writers, publishers, and critics. Its founding patrons were Arthur C. Clarke and Ursula K. Le Guin. A year later it began publication of Foundation: The Review of Science Fiction. Peter Nicholls later took over Foundation, pushing for "academic respectability" rather than Hay's hope, as David Langford put it, of a "pool of practical sf expertise, holding itself ready to be consulted by the Prime Minister in the event of an alien landing."

Hay continued to push for the recognition of Science Fiction. Christopher Priest described him thusly:

Hay was an erratic, good-natured, idiosyncratic, infuriating, barmy, lovable genius: his ideas and words tumbled out so quickly it was hard to keep up with him. In the 1970s he seemed to be everywhere: giving interviews on commercial radio stations, trying to make scientists talk to writers, and vice versa, [...] trying to get film producers to make more science-fiction movies, and from time to time putting together anthologies of short stories which he intended would contribute to or perhaps elucidate his maze of wonky ideas and initiatives.

In 1986, Hay, through the council, convinced Arthur C. Clarke to give his name and financial donations to create the Arthur C. Clarke Award, an annual award given to a work chosen as the best British novel of science fiction from the previous year. It was meant to bring science fiction to the attention of the British public and validate science fiction as a tool of science education.

=== Involvement with Scientology ===
In the 1950's, Hay became fascinated with the idea of L. Ron Hubbard's Dianetics, and became Secretary of the British Dianetic Association. He invited Hubbard to Britain, where he taught classes on the subject. He later credited himself as a "founder-member" of Scientology.

As Dianetics developed into Scientology, Hay would distance himself from the movement and be critical of its original distortion of Dianetics. In his view, Scientology had strayed from its original intent, and was being changed from others around Hubbard, moving away from his original intentions. The leadership was developing into a "paranoid bureaucracy" which Hay opposed, and which he described as "Mafiosi-types". This led to Scientology in 1968 declaring him "a Suppressive Person".

At the 1970 SCICON, Hay invited a Scientologist to speak at a panel, with the intent to "stir things up a bit". Tom Morgan, the Scientologist speaker, gave a very basic introduction to Scientology to what was described as a "hostile crowd". When the panel was opened to questions, Perry Chapdelaine stood up and claimed that not only had he been there when Scientology was founded, but that many of Hubbard's beliefs had either been entirely made up, or had been taken from Chapdelaine without credit. Chapdelaine then ended his talk with, "Scientology is a hoax", which earned a big applause. Hay immediately ended the talk, declaring that the next panel had to start.

=== Death ===
Hay died in Hastings, East Sussex in 1997. He had been crossing the street when a car took an illegal shortcut and collided with him at high speed. He was taken to the hospital, where he suffered a heart attack. Christopher Priest visited him in the hospital before he died. Hay claimed the hospital staff was about to treat him for dementia because he had talked to them about how "the government should set up a Ministry of Science Fiction." Langford later called Priest's story "a bad-taste joke", but said that "no one laughed louder and longer at that than George".

John Clute, writing in Interzone, declared that Hay's death, along with that of Judith Merril, was a "warning shot" signifying that science fiction was now "mostly history".

== Legacy ==
In 2000, the Science Fiction Foundation instituted the George Hay Lecture in his honor. It is a lecture given by "a working scientist, or exponent of science, to an educated audience of fans, on the current work in their field." A full list of the George Hay Lectures can be found on the Science Fiction Foundation website.

In 2003, the editors of The Cambridge Companion to Science Fiction dedicated the book to Hay, who they said "worked tirelessly for the academic recognition of science fiction in Britain."

== Works ==
Novels

- This Planet for Sale (1951)
- Man, Woman and Android (1951)

Serializations:

- Man, Woman and Android (Complete Novel) (1951)
- Flight of the "Hesper" (1952)
- Terra! (1952) [only as by King Lang]

Magazine Editor Series

- Foundation: The Review of Science Fiction
- Foundation, #1 March 1972 (1972) with Charles Barren and Kenneth Bulmer
- Foundation, #2 June 1972 (1972) with Charles Barren and Kenneth Bulmer
- Foundation, #3 March 1973 (1973) with Charles Barren and Kenneth Bulmer
- Foundation, #4 July 1973 (1973) with Charles Barren and Kenneth Bulmer
- Foundation, #5 January 1974 (1974) with Peter Nicholls and Christopher Priest
- Foundation, #6 May 1974 (1974) with Peter Nicholls and Christopher Priest

Anthology Series

- Pulsar
  - 1 Pulsar 1 (1978)
  - 2 Pulsar 2 (1979)

Anthologies

- Hell Hath Fury (1963)
- The Disappearing Future: A Symposium of Speculation (1970)
- Stopwatch (1974)
- The Edward De Bono Science Fiction Collection (1976)
- The Necronomicon: The Book of Dead Names (1978)

Nonfiction

- Foundation: The Review of Science Fiction, Numbers 1-8 (1978)
- The John W. Campbell Letters with Isaac Asimov and A. E. van Vogt, Volume 2 (1993)

Short Fiction

- Over and Out (1965)
- Synopsis (1966)
- The End of the ANTHOLOGY (1972) [only as by Ayre Hogge]
- Letter from Dr Stanislaus Hinterstoisser (1978)
- A Serious Call (1979)
- All That Flies (1980)
- An Error of Long Standing (1985)

Poems

- Twenty Years On (1971)

Essays

- Preface (Hell Hath Fury) (1963)
- Letter (Riverside Quarterly, August 1967) (1967)
- Foreword (The Disappearing Future: A Symposium of Speculation) (1970)
- Letter (Analog, October 1971) (1971)
- untitled (1972)
- Introduction: Science Fiction - Science Fact (1973)
- A Science of Fiction (1973)
- Letter (The Alien Critic #6) (1973)
- For the Record: What the Science Fiction Foundation Ought to Be About (1974)
- Introduction (Stopwatch) (1974)
- Letter (The Alien Critic #11) (1974)
- Introduction (The Food of the Gods) (1976)
- Preface (The Edward De Bono Science Fiction Collection) (1976)
- Introduction (Men Like Gods) (1976)
- Recommended Bookshop - The Einstein Intersection (1976)
- Introduction (The Late Breakfasters) (1977)
- Letter (Sfear II) (1977)
- Letter (Nexus 3) (1977)
- Letter (Science Fiction Review #22) (1977)
- Bibliography to 'Fragments from the Necronomicon' and 'Commentary' (1978)
- Editor's Foreword (The Necronomicon: The Book of Dead Names) (1978)
- Introduction (Pulsar 1) (1978)
- Letter (Science Fiction Review #24) (1978)
- Review of The Spaceflight Revolution (William Sims Bainbridge) (1978)
- Science Fiction: Thinking or Dreaming? (1979)
- Introduction (Pulsar 2) (1979)
- Letter (Science Fiction Review #34) (1980)
- Letter (Locus #232) (1980)
- Letter (Science Fiction Review #36) (1980)
- The Man Who Did (1980)
- Letter (Analog, December 1980) (1980)
- Letter (Foundation #23) (1981)
- Letter (Analog, November 1981) (1981)
- Sleep No More (1982)
- Letter (Ansible 28) (1982)
- Shiel versus the Renegade Romantic (1983)
- Letter (Foundation #28) (1983)
- John Wood Campbell (1985) with Perry A. Chapdelaine [only as by Perry A. Chapdelaine, Sr. and George Hay]
- The John Wood Campbell Letters (1985)
- Keeping Books in Print ... By One Who Knows (1985)
- Letter (Ansible 44) (1985)
- O'Brien's Interim Report (1987)
- Letter (Ansible 50) (1987)
- Science, Scientism, and ... ? (1987)
- Letter: Sublimity and L. Ron Hubbard (1988)
- Mission Earth (1989)
- Letter (Foundation #55) (1992)
- Preface (The R'lyeh Text) (1995)
- Foreword (The Inheritors) (1999)

Reviews

- Anywhen (1972) by James Blish
- Fugue for a Darkening Island (1972) by Christopher Priest
- Lud-in-the-Mist (1972) by Hope Mirrlees
- Mutant 59 The Plastic Eater (1972) by Kit Pedler and Gerry Davis
- R Is for Rocket (1972) by Ray Bradbury
- S Is for Space (1972) by Ray Bradbury
- The Cream of the Jest (1972) by James Branch Cabell
- The Lathe of Heaven (1972) by Ursula K. Le Guin
- The Making of Doctor Who (1972) by Terrance Dicks and Malcolm Hulke
- The Tombs of Atuan (1972) by Ursula K. Le Guin
- Lords of the Starship (1973) by Mark S. Geston
- The Infernal Desire Machines of Doctor Hoffman (1973) by Angela Carter
- A Choice of Gods (1973) by Clifford D. Simak
- A Transatlantic Tunnel, Hurrah! (1973) by Harry Harrison
- Deryni Checkmate (1973) by Katherine Kurtz
- Deryni Rising (1973) by Katherine Kurtz
- The Haunter of the Dark (1973) by H. P. Lovecraft
- The Three Eyes of Evil and Earth's Last Fortress (1974) by A. E. van Vogt
- The Green Isle of the Great Deep (1977) by Neil M. Gunn
- Black Destroyer (1982) by A. E. van Vogt
- Inseminoid (1982) by Larry Miller
- Memory of Tomorrow (1982) by Marc Fingal
- Fantastic Lives: Autobiographical Essays by Notable Science Fiction Writers (1984) by Martin H. Greenberg
- Clockwork Worlds: Mechanized Environments in SF (1984) by Thomas P. Dunn and Richard D. Erlich
- The Mechanical God: Machines in Science Fiction (1984) by Thomas P. Dunn and Richard D. Erlich
- Null-A Three (1985) by A. E. van Vogt
- A Voyage to Arcturus (1988) by David Lindsay
- Grumbles from the Grave (1990) by Robert A. Heinlein
- Ladies Whose Bright Eyes (1990) by Ford Madox Ford
- Retrieved from the Future (1997) by John Seymour

Interviews with This Author

- George Hay: 1976 (1976) by David Langford
