= Hadon of Ancient Opar =

1974 novel by Philip José Farmer

- Cover illustration of Hadon of Ancient Opar
- Author: Philip José Farmer
- Cover artist: Roy Krenkel
- Language: English
- Series: Opar series
- Genre: Fantasy
- Publisher: DAW Books
- Publication date: 1974
- Publication place: United States
- Media type: Print (paperback)
- Pages: 224 pp.
- Followed by: Flight to Opar

Hadon of Ancient Opar is a fantasy novel by American writer Philip José Farmer, first published in paperback by DAW Books in April 1974, and reprinted three times through 1983. The first British edition was published by Magnum in 1977; it was reprinted by Methuen in 1993. The first trade paperback edition was published by Titan Books in 2013. The work has also been translated into French. It was later gathered together with its sequels Flight to Opar and The Song of Kwasin into the omnibus collection Gods of Opar: Tales of Lost Khokarsa (2012). It and its sequels purport to fill in some of the ancient prehistory of the lost city of Opar, created by Edgar Rice Burroughs as a setting for his Tarzan series.

== Plot ==
In the plot of the novel, Hadon journeys to Khokarsa to compete in the "Great Games", in which he triumphs. The prize being that he is entitled to marry the ruling high priestess, should she choose to accept him, and thus become high priest and king of the Khokarsa. However, King Minruth is unwilling to relinquish power and schemes to be rid of Hadon.

The novel deals with the expedition of Hadon, a young Oparian warrior, to the Wild Lands and as far as the mysterious Ringing Sea, which would one day be called the Mediterranean, with the strange woman whom he meets and brings with him, and with the cataclysmic civil war which breaks out on his return and which he partly (and completely unintentionally) helps touch off.

The ancient Khokarsan society of which Opar is a part is a matriarchy (a reasonable inference from the culture of the later-day Opar encountered by Tarzan). A delicate balance between the genders is maintained, symbolized by the co-rule of the high priestess and the king (whose main authority is command of the army), which corresponds to some theories of sociologists and historians on the way actual matriarchal societies may have worked. The same scheme is repeated on a smaller scale on the local level, where towns are co-governed by a local priestess and the commander of the local garrison.

The current king, Minruth, tries to subvert this immemorial system and establish exclusive male power, which incidentally would force an incestuous relationship upon the current high priestess, Awineth, who happens to be his daughter. Lalila, the foreign "White Witch from the Sea," whom Hadon brings with him and with whom he falls in love, is used as a pawn in King Minruth's power game; the xenophobic suspicions aroused about her are used in an attempt to undermine the position of women in general.

Hadon and his male and female friends rally to the high priestess' banner against the king's evil schemes.

== Setting ==
Opar is the first and most frequently re-visited of the many lost cities and cultures which Tarzan discovers in Africa. As portrayed by Burroughs, Opar is ruled by the high priestess La, with whom Tarzan develops a prolonged love/hate relationship. The city itself is a decayed remnant of ancient greatness; it is suggested, though not conclusively, that it is a cut-off colony of Atlantis.

Farmer seizes on Burroughs' ambiguity over the issue to recast Opar as a member city of an otherwise unknown local civilization that flourished in central Africa during the last ice age. It was supposedly based on a pair of now vanished inland seas connected by a narrow strait, with a surface roughly equivalent to the Mediterranean. The two seas facilitated the appearance of a mercantile culture, technologically similar to Ancient Greece, while the rest of the world was still deep in the Stone Age.

Farmer shows this culture at or near the peak of its ancient glory, more than 10,000 years ago. It comprises numerous thriving (and sometimes warring) city states and empires, one of which is Opar. Opar is, in fact, far from the most important of these cities. The Opar described in the Tarzan novels is depicted as a "former colony of Atlantis" and this is adhered to by Farmer, though "Atlantis" in this context—the capital of the empire of which Opar is a province—is located on an island in the African inland sea, not in the Atlantic Ocean.

Eventually, subsequent to the period of his story, the two seas drain off into the Atlantic and the culture dependent on them decays and disappears, leaving only the remnant of Opar forgotten in the jungles where Tarzan will discover it. The seas' modern remnants are represented to be the much-shrunken Lake Chad and the Congo River basin.

While originally derived from the Tarzan series, the world created by Farmer is given its own independent literary existence, with the sociological and cultural aspects worked out in meticulous detail, and a long historical annex added at the end.

== Reception ==
Lester del Rey found the novel to be "good fun" and noted that Farmer was not imitating Burroughs either in storytelling or characterization, although he faulted Farmer for providing an installment in a longer story rather than one with a dramatic resolution. Commenting on the novel for The New York Times, Theodore Sturgeon described Farmer as "tireless and astonishing".

== See also ==
- Khokarsa
