= The Compleat Werewolf =

1942 short story by Anthony Boucher

"The Compleat Werewolf" is a 1942 fantasy short story by Anthony Boucher. It was first published in Unknown Worlds.

== Synopsis ==
When philology professor Wolfe Wolf learns a magic word that can transform him into a wolf, the consequences are not what he expected.

== Reception ==
"The Compleat Werewolf" was a finalist for the 1943 Retro-Hugo Award for Best Novella.

Kirkus Reviews called it a "giddy burlesque", while the SF Site listed it among Boucher's "best stories". Brian Stableford described it as an example of "preliminary de-historicization followed by re-accommodation to American pragmatism".

Its presence in the 2013 anthology Unnatural Creatures brought it to renewed attention, with Publishers Weekly stating that it was "astonishingly silly"; however, Tor.com felt that it was "a little out-of-step and dated", and the A.V. Club noted that "cramming Nazis, werewolves, Indian rope tricks, and talking cats into one narrative (is) quite a feat, but still takes too long" compared to more modern stories.
