= Anthony Boucher =

American author, critic, and editor (1911–1968)

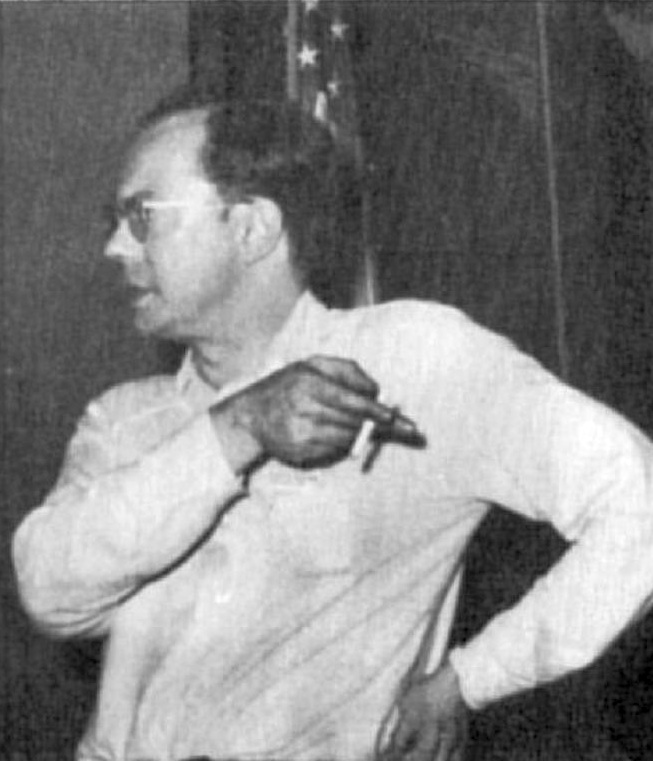
- Anthony Boucher 1952
- Born: William Anthony Parker White; August 21, 1911; Oakland, California, U.S.
- Died: April 29, 1968 (aged 56); Oakland, California, U.S.
- Occupations: Writer, editor
- Writing career
- Pen name: Anthony Boucher, H. H. Holmes
- Language: English
- Genres: Crime, mystery

William Anthony Parker White (August 21, 1911 – April 29, 1968), better known by his pen name Anthony Boucher (/ˈbaʊtʃər/), was an American author, critic, and editor who wrote several classic mystery novels, short stories, science fiction, and radio dramas. Between 1942 and 1947, he acted as reviewer of mostly mystery fiction for the San Francisco Chronicle. In addition to "Anthony Boucher", White also employed the pseudonym "H. H. Holmes", which was the pseudonym of a late-19th-century American serial killer; Boucher also wrote light verse which he signed "Herman W. Mudgett" (the murderer's real name).

In a 1981 poll of 17 detective story writers and reviewers, his novel Nine Times Nine was voted as the ninth best locked room mystery of all time.

== Background ==
White was born in Oakland, California, and went to college at the University of Southern California. He later received a master's degree from the University of California, Berkeley.

After a friend told him that "William White" was too common a name, he used "H. H. Holmes" to write and review mysteries and "Anthony Boucher" for science fiction and fantasy. He pronounced Boucher phonetically, "to rhyme with voucher".

== Fiction writing and editing ==
Boucher (as he was more commonly known) wrote mystery, science fiction, and horror. He was also an editor, including science fiction anthologies, and wrote mystery reviews for many years in The New York Times. He was one of the first English translators of Jorge Luis Borges, translating "The Garden of Forking Paths" for Ellery Queen's Mystery Magazine. He helped found the Mystery Writers of America in 1946 and, in the same year, was one of the first winners of the MWA's Edgar Award for his mystery reviews in the San Francisco Chronicle. He was a founding editor (with J. Francis McComas) of The Magazine of Fantasy & Science Fiction from 1949 to 1958, and attempted to make literary quality an important aspect of science fiction. He won the Hugo Award for Best Professional Magazine in 1957 and 1958. Boucher also edited the long-running Best from Fantasy and Science Fiction anthology series, from 1952 to 1959.

Among Boucher's critical writing was also contributing annual summaries of the state of speculative fiction for Judith Merril's The Year's Best SF series; as editor, he published the volumes in E. P. Dutton's The Best Detective Stories of the Year annual volumes published in 1963–1968, succeeding Brett Halliday and followed, after his death, by Allen J. Hubin in that task.

Boucher's first short story saw print when he was fifteen years old in the January 1927 issue of Weird Tales. Titled "Ye Goode Olde Ghoste Storie," it was the only story to appear under his real name, William A. P. White. Boucher went on to write short stories for many pulp fiction magazines in America, including Adventure, Astounding, Black Mask, Ed McBain's Mystery Book, Ellery Queen's Mystery Magazine, Galaxy Science Fiction, The Master Detective, Unknown Worlds and Weird Tales.

His short story "The Quest for Saint Aquin" was among the stories selected in 1970 by the Science Fiction Writers of America as one of the best science fiction short stories of all time. As such, it was published in The Science Fiction Hall of Fame, Volume One, 1929–1964.

Boucher was the friend and mentor of science-fiction writer Philip K. Dick and others. His 1942 novel Rocket to the Morgue, in addition to being a classic locked room mystery, is also something of a roman à clef about the Southern California science fiction culture of the time, featuring thinly veiled versions of personalities such as Robert A. Heinlein, L. Ron Hubbard and rocket scientist/occultist/fan Jack Parsons.

== Radio ==
Boucher also scripted for radio and was involved in many other activities, as described by William F. Nolan in his essay "Who Was Anthony Boucher?":

The 1940s proved to be a very busy and productive decade for Boucher. In 1945 he launched into a spectacular three-year radio career, plotting more than 100 episodes for The Adventures of Ellery Queen, while also providing plots for the bulk of the Sherlock Holmes radio dramas. By the summer of 1946 he had created his own mystery series for the airwaves, The Casebook of Gregory Hood. ("I was turning out three scripts each week for as many shows," he stated. "It was a mix of hard work and great fun.")

With respect to his scripting of the Sherlock Holmes radio dramas, Nigel Bruce, who played Dr. Watson, said that Boucher "had a sound knowledge of Conan Doyle and a great affection for the two characters of Holmes and Watson."

== Magazine of Fantasy and Science Fiction years ==
Boucher left dramatic radio in 1948, "mainly because I was putting in a lot of hours working with J. Francis McComas in creating what soon became The Magazine of Fantasy and Science Fiction. We got it off the ground in 1949 and saw it take hold solidly by 1950. This was a major creative challenge and although I was involved in a lot of other projects, I stayed with F&SF into 1958."

Throughout his years with the magazine, Boucher was involved in many other projects. He wrote fiction for the SF and mystery markets (primarily short stories). He taught an informal writing class from his home in Berkeley. He continued his Sunday mystery columns for the New York Times Book Review, while also writing crime-fiction reviews for The New York Herald Tribune as Holmes (he also reviewed SF and fantasy (as H. H. Holmes) for the Herald Tribune) and functioning as chief critic for Ellery Queen's Mystery Magazine. He edited True Crime Detective, supervised the Mercury Mystery Line and (later) the Dell Great Mystery Library; hosted Golden Voices, his series of historical opera recordings for Pacifica Radio, and served (in 1951) as president of Mystery Writers of America.

As part of his reviews of mystery novels, he published a list of Best Crime Fiction of the Year from 1949 to 1967, listing from 12 to 15 titles each year. He published his list as Anthony Boucher.

Boucher was a poker player, a political activist, a sport fan (football, basketball, track, gymnastics and rugby), a Sherlockian in The Baker Street Irregulars and a chef. He was also an expert collector of recordings of early operatic singers.

== Television ==
In 1964-1965 Boucher worked as a story consultant for the Kraft Suspense Theatre.

== Death ==
Boucher died of lung cancer on April 29, 1968, at the Kaiser Foundation Hospital in Oakland.

== Bouchercon ==
Bouchercon, the "Anthony Boucher Memorial World Mystery Convention", was named in his honor, as are their annual Anthony Awards. Descriptions of those conventions from the first, in 1970, until that in 2004, appear in Marvin Lachman's The Heirs of Anthony Boucher.

== Selected works ==
=== Short stories ===
- "The Compleat Werewolf" (1942)
- "The Quest for Saint Aquin" (1951)

=== Mystery novels ===
- The Case of the Seven of Calvary (1937)
- The Case of the Baker Street Irregulars (1940)

==== Fergus O'Breen series ====
- The Case of the Crumpled Knave (1939)
- The Case of the Solid Key (1941)
- The Case of the Seven Sneezes (1942)

==== Sister Ursula ====
1. Nine Times Nine (as H. H. Holmes) (1940)
2. Rocket to the Morgue (as H. H. Holmes) (1942)

=== Collections of short fiction and scripts of radio plays ===
- Far and Away: Eleven Fantasy and SF Stories (1955)
- The Compleat Werewolf and Other Stories of Fantasy and SF (1969)
- Exeunt Murderers: The Best Mystery Stories of Anthony Boucher, edited by Francis M. Nevins Jr., and Martin H. Greenberg (1983)
- The Compleat Boucher: The Complete Short Science Fiction and Fantasy of Anthony Boucher, edited by James A. Mann (1999)
- The Casebook of Gregory Hood: Radio Plays by Anthony Boucher and Denis Green, edited by Joe R. Christopher (Crippen & Landru, 2009)

=== Collections of reviews ===
- The Anthony Boucher Chronicles: Reviews and Commentary 1942-1947: Volume I: As Crime Goes By, edited by Francis M. Nevins (2001) (reviews from San Francisco Chronicle)
- The Anthony Boucher Chronicles: Reviews and Commentary 1942-1947: Volume II: The Week in Murder, edited by Francis M. Nevins (2001)
- The Anthony Boucher Chronicles: Reviews and Commentary 1942-1947: Volume III: A Bookman's Buffet, edited by Francis M. Nevins (2001)

[These three volumes were later published in one volume.]

- Multiplying Villainies: Selected Mystery Criticism 1942-1968, edited by Francis M. Nevins and Robert Briney (1983) (reviews from the New York Times)

=== Other ===
- The Lost Adventures of Sherlock Holmes: based on the original radio plays by Dennis Green and Anthony Boucher, Written by Ken Greenwald (1989)
- The Forgotten Adventures of Sherlock Holmes: Based on the Original Radio Plays by Anthony Boucher and Denis Green, by H. Paul Jeffers (2005)

== Sources ==
- New General Catalog of Old Books and Authors
- Clute and Nicholls, 1993, The Encyclopedia of Science Fiction, St. Martins. ISBN 0-312-13486-X
- Marvin Lachman, The Heirs of Anthony Boucher: A History of Mystery Fandom, intro. Edward D. Hoch, Poisoned Pen Press, 2005. ISBN 1-59058-223-3
- Jeffrey Marks, Anthony Boucher: A Biobibliography, McFarland and Company, 2008. ISBN 978-0-7864-3320-9
