= Unknown (magazine) =

American pulp fantasy fiction magazine

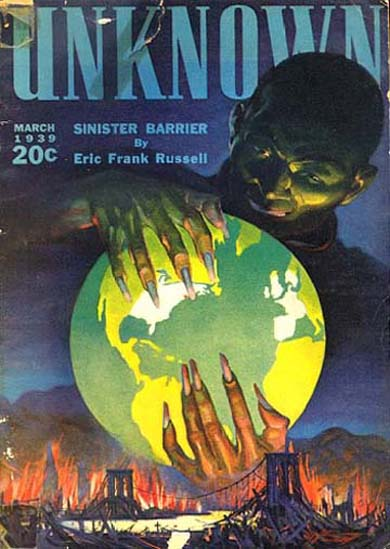
- The first issue of Unknown; Cover art by H. W. Scott
- Editor: John W. Campbell
- Categories: Fantasy fiction magazine
- Founded: 1938
- Final issue Number: 1943 vol. 7 no. 3 (39th)
- Company: Street & Smith
- Country: United States
- Language: English

Unknown (also known as Unknown Worlds) was an American pulp fantasy fiction magazine, published from 1939 to 1943 by Street & Smith, and edited by John W. Campbell. Unknown was a companion to Street & Smith's science fiction pulp, Astounding Science Fiction, which was also edited by Campbell at the time; many authors and illustrators contributed to both magazines. The leading fantasy magazine in the 1930s was Weird Tales, which focused on shock and horror. Campbell wanted to publish a fantasy magazine with more finesse and humor than Weird Tales, and put his plans into action when Eric Frank Russell sent him the manuscript of his novel Sinister Barrier, about aliens who own the human race. Unknown's first issue appeared in March 1939; in addition to Sinister Barrier, it included H. L. Gold's "Trouble With Water", a humorous fantasy about a New Yorker who meets a water gnome. Gold's story was the first of many in Unknown to combine commonplace reality with the fantastic.

Campbell required his authors to avoid simplistic horror fiction and insisted that the fantasy elements in a story be developed logically: for example, Jack Williamson's Darker Than You Think describes a world in which there is a scientific explanation for the existence of werewolves. Similarly, L. Sprague de Camp and Fletcher Pratt's Harold Shea series, about a modern American who finds himself in the worlds of various mythologies, depicts a system of magic based on mathematical logic. Other notable works included several novels by L. Ron Hubbard and short stories such as Manly Wade Wellman's "When It Was Moonlight" and Fritz Leiber's "Two Sought Adventure", the first in his Fafhrd and the Gray Mouser series.

Unknown was forced to a bimonthly schedule in 1941 by poor sales and canceled in 1943 when wartime paper shortages became so acute that Campbell had to choose between turning Astounding into a bimonthly or ending Unknown. The magazine is generally regarded as the finest fantasy fiction magazine ever published, despite the fact that it was not commercially successful, and in the opinion of science fiction historian Mike Ashley it was responsible for the creation of the modern fantasy publishing genre.

== Background and publication history ==
Issues of Unknown, showing volume/issue number.
Year	Jan	Feb	Mar	Apr	May	Jun	Jul	Aug	Sep	Oct	Nov	Dec
1939			1/1	1/2	1/3	1/4	1/5	1/6	2/1	2/2	2/3	2/4
1940	2/5	2/6	3/1	3/2	3/3	3/4	3/5	3/6	4/1	4/2	4/3	4/4
1941		4/5		4/6		5/1		5/2		5/3		5/4
1942		5/5		5/6		6/1		6/2		6/3		6/4
1943		6/5		6/6		7/1		7/2		7/3		
John W. Campbell was editor throughout.

In May 1923, the first issue of Weird Tales appeared, from Rural Publications in Chicago. Weird Tales was a pulp magazine that specialized in fantasy stories and material that no other magazine would accept. It was not initially successful, but by the 1930s had established itself and was regularly publishing science fiction (SF) as well as fantasy. Weird Tales was the first magazine to focus solely on fantasy, and it remained the pre-eminent magazine in this field for over a decade. In the meantime, science fiction was starting to form a separately marketed genre, with the appearance in 1926 of Amazing Stories, a pulp magazine edited by Hugo Gernsback. In 1930 pulp publisher Clayton Publications launched Astounding Stories of Super Science, but the company's bankruptcy in 1933 led to the acquisition of the magazine by Street & Smith. The title was shortened to Astounding Stories, and it became the leading magazine in the science fiction field over the next few years under the editorship of F. Orlin Tremaine. At the end of 1937, John W. Campbell took over as editor.

By 1938, Campbell was planning a fantasy companion to Astounding: Weird Tales was still the leader in the fantasy genre, though competitors such as Strange Stories were also being launched. Campbell began acquiring stories suitable for the new magazine, without a definite launch date in mind. When Eric Frank Russell sent him the manuscript of his novel Sinister Barrier, Campbell decided it was time to put his plans into action. The first issue of Unknown appeared in March 1939. It was a monthly at first, but poor sales forced a switch to a bimonthly schedule beginning in February 1941. In December 1940, the subtitle Fantasy Fiction was added, and in October 1941, the main title was changed to Unknown Worlds; both changes were intended to make the genre of the magazine clearer to potential readers. When wartime paper shortages became severe in late 1943, Campbell chose to keep Astounding monthly and cancel Unknown, rather than switch the former to a bimonthly schedule as well. The last issue was dated October 1943.

== Contents and reception ==
Campbell's plans for Unknown were laid out in the February 1939 issue of Astounding, in the announcement of the new magazine. He argued that "it has been the quality of the fantasy that you have read in the past that has made the very word anathema ... [Unknown] will offer fantasy of a quality so far different from that which has appeared in the past as to change your entire understanding of the term". The first issue, the following month, led with Russell's Sinister Barrier, (Note: Russell's original title was Forbidden Acres.) the novel that had persuaded Campbell to set his plans for a fantasy magazine into motion: the plot, involving aliens who own the human race, has been described by SF historian Mike Ashley as "a strange mixture of science fiction and occult fantasy". Campbell asked Russell for revisions to the story to emphasize the fantastic elements but still demanded that Russell work out the logical implications of his premises. This became a defining characteristic of the fiction published in Unknown; in Ashley's words, Campbell "brought the science fiction rationale to fantasy". The first issue also contained Horace L. Gold's "Trouble with Water", a comic fantasy about a modern New Yorker who offends a water gnome; in its whimsicality and naturalistic merging of a modern background with a classic fantasy trope, "Trouble with Water" was a better indication than Sinister Barrier of the direction Unknown would take. Campbell commented in a letter at the time that Sinister Barrier, "Trouble with Water", and "'Where Angels Fear ...'" by Manly Wade Wellman were the only stories in the first issue that accurately reflected his goals for the magazine. (Note: In the letter, to early contributor L. Ron Hubbard, Campbell asks Hubbard for a story with an Arabian Nights theme and comments that "Death Sentence" by Robert Moore Williams and "Dark Vision" by Frank Belknap Long are next in quality, while "Who Wants Power?" by Mona Farnsworth and "Closed Doors" by A. MacFadyen Jr. were merely "filling space ... acceptably".)

Under Campbell's editorial supervision, the fantasy element in Unknown stories had to be treated rigorously. This naturally led to the appearance in Unknown of writers already comfortable with similar rigor in science fiction stories, and Campbell soon established a small group of writers as regular contributors, many of whom were also appearing in the pages of Astounding. L. Ron Hubbard, Theodore Sturgeon, and L. Sprague de Camp were among the most prolific. Hubbard contributed eight lead novels including Typewriter in the Sky, Slaves of Sleep, and Fear, described by Ashley as a "classic psychological thriller"; SF historian and critic Thomas Clareson describes all eight as "outstanding". De Camp, in collaboration with Fletcher Pratt, contributed three stories featuring Harold Shea, who finds himself in a world where magic operates by rigorous rules. The title of one of these, "The Mathematics of Magic", is, according to SF critic John Clute, "perfectly expressive of the terms under which magic found easy mention in Unknown".

Cover for the February 1942 issue – an example of the more dignified cover layout that was adopted in July 1940

Other Astounding writers who wrote for Unknown included Robert A. Heinlein, whose "The Devil Makes the Law" (reprinted as "Magic, Inc.") depicts a world where magic is a part of everyday life. Heinlein also contributed "The Unpleasant Profession of Jonathan Hoag" and "They", described by Ashley as "perhaps the ultimate solipsist fantasy". A.E. van Vogt, a frequent Astounding contributor, appeared in the final issue with "The Book of Ptath" (later expanded into a novel). Isaac Asimov, despite multiple attempts to write for Unknown, never appeared in the magazine. On his sixth attempt, he sold "Author! Author!" to Campbell, but the magazine was canceled before it could appear. It eventually appeared in the anthology The Unknown Five.

In addition to the overlap between the writers of Unknown and Astounding, there was a good deal of overlap between their readerships: Asimov records that during the war, he read only these two magazines. (Note: Asimov regarded Unknown as his favorite magazine and always kept up to date reading it, while he might be several issues behind on reading Astounding.) SF historian Paul Carter has argued that the spectrum of fantastic fiction from Weird Tales through Unknown to Astounding was far less cleanly separated than is sometimes assumed: many stories in the early science fiction magazines such as Wonder Stories were more like the works of Edgar Allan Poe than they were tales of scientific imagination.

Fritz Leiber's first published story was "Two Sought Adventure", which appeared in the August 1939 issue of Unknown; this was the first story in his long-running Fafhrd and the Gray Mouser series about a pair of adventurers in a sword and sorcery setting. Four more Fafhrd and the Gray Mouser stories appeared in Unknown in as many years, and Leiber's novel Conjure Wife, about a man who discovers that all women are secretly witches, was the lead story in the April 1943 issue. The protagonist, a university professor, "is forced to abandon scepticism and discover the underlying equations of magic, via symbolic logic", in critic David Langford's description. Leiber also contributed "Smoke Ghost" in October 1941, described by Ashley as "arguably the first seriously modern ghost story". Another writer whose first story appeared in Unknown was James H. Schmitz, whose "Greenface" appeared in the August 1943 issue.

Other notable stories that appeared in Unknown include Jack Williamson's "Darker Than You Think" (December 1940), which provides a scientific basis for a race of werewolves living undetected alongside human beings. Expanded into a novel in 1948, it remains Williamson's best-known fantasy, and SF historian Malcolm Edwards comments that the two protagonists' relationship is "depicted with a tortured (and still haunting) erotic frankness unusual in genre literature of the 1940s". In addition to the Harold Shea pieces, de Camp published several other well-received stories, including "The Wheels of If" (October 1940) and "Lest Darkness Fall" (December 1939), an alternate history story about a time-traveler who attempts to save the Roman Empire from the coming Dark Ages; Edwards and Clute comment that the story is "the most accomplished early excursion into history in magazine SF, and is regarded as a classic". Also highly regarded is Wellman's "When It Was Moonlight" (December 1940), a story about Poe.

The first sixteen issues of Unknown had cover paintings, but from July 1940 the cover style was changed to a table of contents, with a small ink drawing usually accompanying the summary of each story, in an attempt to make the magazine appear more dignified. The cover art came almost entirely from artists who did not contribute to many science fiction or fantasy magazines: six of the sixteen paintings were by H. W. Scott; Manuel Islip, Modest Stein, Graves Gladney, and Edd Cartier provided the others. Cartier was the only one of these who regularly contributed to SF and fantasy periodicals; he painted four of Unknown's last six covers before the change to a text-heavy design.

== Influence ==
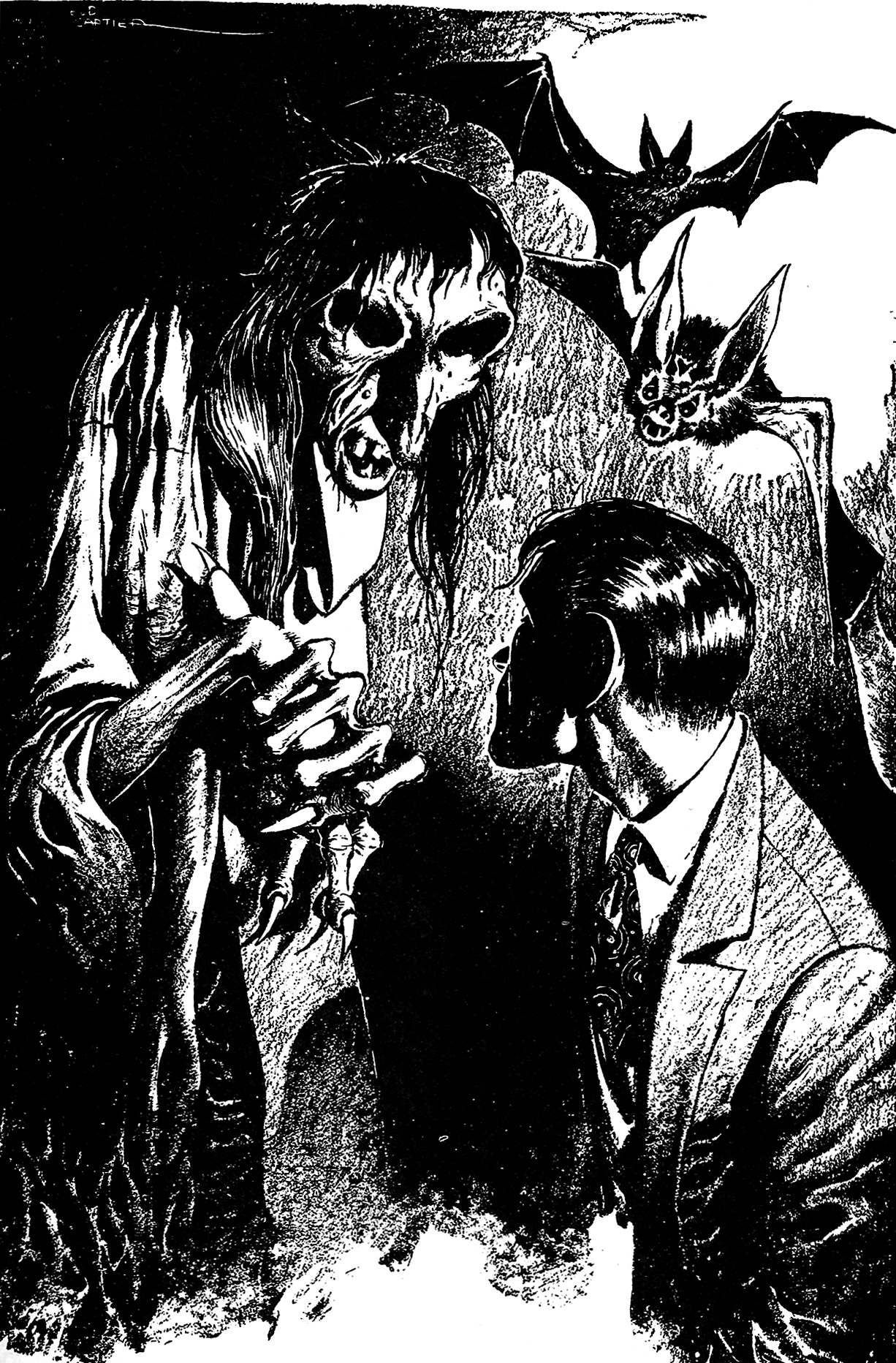
Illustration by Edd Cartier for L. Ron Hubbard's "Fear" (July 1940)

Unknown was, along with Weird Tales, an important early influence on the fantasy genre. In the foreword to From Unknown Worlds, in 1948, Campbell commented that fantasy before Unknown had been too much infused with "gloom and terror"; his approach in Unknown had been to assume that the "creatures of mythology and folklore" could be characters in an amusing tale as easily as they could be made part of a horror story. Horror stories, he said, had a place, but "horror injected with a sharp and poisoned needle is just as effective as when applied with the blunt-instrument technique of the so-called Gothic horror tale". Campbell insisted on the same rational approach to fantasy that he required of his science fiction writers, and in the words of Clareson, this led to the destruction of "not only the prevalent narrative tone but also most of the trappings that had dominated fantasy from The Castle of Otranto and The Monk through the nineteenth century to Weird Tales". Unknown quickly separated itself from Weird Tales, whose fantasies still primarily aimed to produce fear or shock. The closest predecessor to Unknown was Thorne Smith, whose prohibition-era "Topper" stories also mixed fantasy with humor. Before Unknown, fantasy had received little serious attention, though on occasion writers such as James Branch Cabell had achieved respectability. In Ashley's opinion, Unknown created the modern genre of fantasy, though commercial success for the genre had to wait until the 1970s.

Clareson also suggests that Unknown influenced the science fiction that appeared in Astounding after Unknown folded. According to this view, stories such as Clifford Simak's City series would not have appeared without the destruction of genre boundaries that Campbell oversaw. Clareson further proposes that Galaxy Science Fiction and The Magazine of Fantasy & Science Fiction, two of the most important and successful science fiction and fantasy magazines, were direct descendants of Unknown.

Unknown is widely regarded as the finest fantasy magazine ever published: Ashley says, for example, that "Unknown published without doubt the greatest collection of fantasy stories produced in one magazine." Despite its lack of commercial success, Unknown is the most lamented of all science fiction and fantasy magazines; Lester del Rey describes it as having gained "a devotion from its readers that no other magazine can match". Edwards comments that Unknown "appeared during Campbell's peak years as an editor; its reputation may stand as high as it does partly because it died while still at its best".

== Bibliographic details ==
Issues of the British reprint of Unknown, showing volume/issue number
Year	Win	Spring			Summer			Autumn			Winter	
Year	Jan	Feb	Mar	Apr	May	Jun	Jul	Aug	Sep	Oct	Nov	Dec
1939									2/1	2/2	2/3	2/4
1940	2/5	2/6	3/1	3/2	3/3	3/4	3/5	3/6	4/1	4/2	4/3	4/4
1941		4/5					4/6					
1942			5/5			6/1				6/3		
1943	6/4				6/5					(nn)		
1944	(nn)				(nn)			(nn)				
1945		3/4						3/5			3/6	
1946					3/7						3/8	
1947		3/9			3/10						3/11	
1948		3/12			4/1						4/2	
1949		4/3			4/4						4/5	
Underlining indicates that an issue was dated with the season ("Spring 1945") rather than the month. John W. Campbell was editor throughout.

Unknown was edited by John W. Campbell and published by Street & Smith Publications throughout its run. It was pulp-sized from its launch through August 1941, and then bedsheet-sized from October 1941 to April 1943. The last three issues were pulp-sized again. Street & Smith had planned to switch it to digest size with the December 1943 issue, but it was canceled before that issue appeared. The price began at 20 cents and rose to 25 cents with the change to bedsheet size; it remained at 25 cents when the size changed back to pulp. It had 164 pages when pulp-sized and 130 pages while it was bedsheet-sized. It began as a monthly and switched to bimonthly from December 1940 on. The volume numbering was regular, with six volumes of six numbers and a final volume of three numbers. The title began as simply Unknown. In December 1940 "Fantasy Fiction" was added as a subtitle, and from the October 1941 issue the title became Unknown Worlds.

The first six U.S. issues were available directly in the UK, but thereafter an abridged British reprint edition was issued by Atlas Publications, beginning in September 1939. It was pulp-sized, and priced at 9d (nine pence) throughout. It appeared on a regular monthly schedule until December 1940, after which the schedule became quite irregular, with two or three issues appearing each year until 1949. The volume numbering initially followed the corresponding U.S. editions, with some omitted numbers in 1942 and 1943, and then disappeared for four issues; from the twenty-eighth issue (Spring 1945) the magazine was numbered as if it had been given volumes of twelve numbers since the start of the run. The title was changed from Unknown to Unknown Worlds with the March 1942 issue.

=== Related publications ===
In 1948, Street & Smith reprinted several stories from Unknown in a bedsheet-sized magazine format, priced at 25 cents, with the title From Unknown Worlds. This was an attempt to determine if there was a market for a revived Unknown. Street & Smith printed 300,000 copies, against the advice of John Campbell, but although it sold better than the original, too many copies were returned for the publisher to be willing to revive the magazine. The issue was reprinted in Britain in 1952, reduced in size to 7 by 9.5 inches (180 mm × 240 mm) and cut from 130 pages to 124; it was priced at 2/6 (two shillings and six pence). Part of the run was issued in a hardcover binding at a higher price. One story from the U.S. version was omitted: "One Man's Harp" by Babette Rosmond.

Three anthologies of stories from Unknown were published in the early 1960s. The Unknown Five includes four stories reprinted from Unknown and the first print appearance of "Author! Author!", by Isaac Asimov, which was sold to Unknown shortly before Street & Smith shut it down. Two additional Unknown anthologies were published in the late 1980s.

Year	Editor	Title	Publisher	Length and price
1948	John W. Campbell, Jr.	From Unknown Worlds	Street & Smith: New York	130 pp.; 25¢
1963	D. R. Bensen	The Unknown	Pyramid: New York	192 pp.; 50¢
1963	George Hay	Hell Hath Fury	Neville Spearman: London	240 pp.; 15/-
1964	D. R. Bensen	The Unknown Five	Pyramid: New York	190 pp.; 50¢
1988	Stanley Schmidt	Unknown	Baen Books: New York	304 pp.; $3.50
1989	Stanley Schmidt, Martin H. Greenberg	Unknown Worlds: Tales from Beyond	Galahad Books: New York	517 pp.; $9.98

== Sources ==
- Ashley, Michael (1976) [First edition 1975]. The History of the Science Fiction Magazine Vol. 2 1936–1945. Chicago: Henry Regnery Company. ISBN 0-8092-8002-7.
- Ashley, Mike (2000). The Time Machines:The Story of the Science-Fiction Pulp Magazines from the beginning to 1950. Liverpool: Liverpool University Press. ISBN 0-85323-865-0.
- Asimov, Isaac (1979). In Memory Yet Green. Garden City, NY: Doubleday. ISBN 0-385-13679-X.
- Carter, Paul A. (1977). The Creation of Tomorrow: Fifty Years of Magazine Science Fiction. New York: Columbia University Press. ISBN 0-231-04211-6.
- Chapdelaine, Perry A.; Chapdelaine, Tony; Hay, George (1985). The John W. Campbell Letters: Volume 1. Franklin, TN: AC Projects. ISBN 0-931150-16-7.
- Clute, John; Grant, John (1997). The Encyclopedia of Fantasy. New York: St. Martin's Press, Inc. ISBN 0-312-15897-1.
- Clute, John; Nicholls, Peter (1993). The Encyclopedia of Science Fiction. New York: St. Martin's Press, Inc. ISBN 0-312-09618-6.
- Currey, Lloyd W. (1978). Science Fiction and Fantasy Authors: A Bibliography of First Printings of Their Fiction and Selected Nonfiction. Boston: G.K. Hall & Co. ISBN 0-8161-8242-6.
- del Rey, Lester (1979). The World of Science Fiction: 1926–1976: The History of a Subculture. New York: Ballantine Books. ISBN 0-345-25452-X.
- Hartwell, David G. (1987). The Dark Descent. New York: T. Doherty Associates. ISBN 0-312-93035-6.
- Kyle, David (1977). The Pictorial History of Science Fiction. London: Hamlyn. ISBN 0-600-38193-5.
- Tuck, Donald H. (1974). The Encyclopedia of Science Fiction and Fantasy. Vol. 1. Chicago: Advent: Publishers, Inc. ISBN 0-911682-20-1.
- Tuck, Donald H. (1982). The Encyclopedia of Science Fiction and Fantasy. Vol. 3. Chicago: Advent: Publishers, Inc. ISBN 0-911682-26-0.
- Tymn, Marshall B.; Ashley, Mike (1985). Science Fiction, Fantasy and Weird Fiction Magazines. Westport CT: Greenwood Press. ISBN 0-313-21221-X.
