= Avalon Books =

Former New York-based book publishing imprint

- Status: Defunct
- Founded: 1950
- Founder: Thomas Bouregy
- Successor: Amazon Publishing
- Country of origin: United States
- Headquarters location: New York
- Fiction genres: Science fiction, mystery, romance
- Official website: avalonbooks.com (archived)

Avalon Books (originally Bouregy & Curl) was a small New York-based book publishing imprint owned by Thomas Bouregy & Company.

Established in 1950 by Thomas Bouregy, it would be run by his daughter, Ellen Bouregy Mickelsen, from 1995 to 2012 when it was sold to Amazon. Avalon was an important science fiction imprint in the 1950s and 60s; later its specialty was mystery and romance books.

On June 4, 2012 it was announced that Amazon had purchased the imprint and its back-list of about 3,000 titles. Amazon said it would publish the books through the various imprints of Amazon Publishing.

== Science fiction era ==
In the 1950s and 60s Avalon specialized in science fiction. It issued hardcover material in the genre during the period, particularly in the earlier portion. Avalon issued new titles, reissued out of print titles originally from other publishers, and first editions of material that had previously only seen magazine publication. Frederik Pohl jibed in 1959 that the publisher "seems to be pursuing a policy of printing the worst books by the best writers in science fiction". Its books featured cover art by Ric Binkley, Ed Emshwiller (also known as Emsh), Gray Morrow, and Michael M. Peters. Later, competition with mainstream hardcover and paperback publishers starting their own science fiction lines and the marginal nature of genre publishing in general led to the line being discontinued.

=== Science fiction authors published by Avalon ===
- Poul Anderson
- E. L. Arch
- Bruce Ariss
- Manly Banister
- Eando Binder
- James Blish
- J. Harvey Bond
- Lin Carter
- Curtis W. Casewit
- A. Bertram Chandler
- Adam Chase
- Stanton A. Coblentz
- Hunt Collins
- Ray Cummings
- L. Sprague de Camp
- Lester del Rey
- Diane Detzer
- George Allan England
- Oscar J. Friend
- J. U. Giesy
- David Grinnell
- J. Hunter Holly
- Raymond F. Jones
- Ivar Jorgenson
- Joseph E. Kelleam
- Otis Adelbert Kline
- Murray Leinster
- Erik Van Lhin
- Charles R. Long
- Frank Belknap Long
- Robert W. Lowndes
- Adam Lukens
- Fred MacIsaac
- Charles Eric Maine
- S. P. Meek
- Philip Francis Nowlan
- David Osborne
- Rog Phillips
- Fletcher Pratt
- Jorge de Reyna
- Eric Frank Russell
- Robert Sheckley
- Lee Sheldon
- Robert Silverberg
- Evelyn E. Smith
- George Henry Smith
- George O. Smith
- Francis Stevens
- Charles B. Stilson
- Leslie F. Stone
- Jeff Sutton
- E. C. Tubb
- Jack Vance
- Roger Lee Vernon
- Manly Wade Wellman
- Wallace West
- Robert Moore Williams
- Russ Winterbotham

=== Bibliography of Science Fiction books published (by year) ===
1953 (Bourgey/Curl)

- Flight Into Yesterday (Charles L. Harness)
- Sentinels From Space (Eric Frank Russell)

1956

- Police Your Planet (Erik Van Lhin)
- Star Ways (Poul Anderson)
- The Secret People (Raymond F. Jones)
- Three to Conquer (Eric Frank Russell)
- Tomorrow's World (Hunt Collins)

1957

- Across Time (David Grinnell)
- Alien Dust (E. C. Tubb)
- Big Planet (Jack Vance)
- City on the Moon (Murray Leinster)
- Conquest of Earth (Manly Banister)
- Hidden World (Stanton A. Coblentz)
- Solomon's Stone (L. Sprague de Camp)
- The Infinite Brain (Charles R. Long)
- Troubled Star (George O. Smith)
- Twice in Time (Manly Wade Wellman)
- Wasp (Eric Frank Russell)

1958

- Aliens From Space (David Osborne)
- Edge of Time (David Grinnell)
- Fire in the Heavens (George O. Smith)
- Immortality Delivered (Robert Sheckley)
- Invisible Barriers (David Osborne)
- Out of This World (Murray Leinster)
- Spaceways Satellite (Charles Eric Maine)
- Starhaven (Ivar Jorgenson)
- The Blue Barbarians (Stanton A. Coblentz)
- The Languages of Pao (Jack Vance)
- The Space Egg (Russ Winterbotham)
- The Tower of Zanid (L. Sprague de Camp)

1959

- Day of the Giants (Lester del Rey)
- Encounter (J. Hunter Holly)
- Giants from Eternity (Manly Wade Wellman)
- Lost in Space (George O. Smith)
- Robot Hunt (Roger Lee Vernon)
- The Dark Destroyers (Manly Wade Wellman)
- The Duplicated Man (James Blish) and (Robert Lowndes)
- The Golden Ape (Adam Chase)
- The Involuntary Immortals (Rog Phillips)
- The Martian Missile (David Grinnell)
- The Sea People (Adam Lukens)
- Virgin Planet (Poul Anderson)

1960

- Conquest of Life (Adam Lukens)
- He Owned the World (Charles Eric Maine)
- Hunters of Space (Joseph E. Kelleam)
- Invaders from Rigel (Fletcher Pratt)
- Lords of Atlantis (Wallace West)
- Next Door to the Sun (Stanton A. Coblentz)
- The Glory That Was (L. Sprague de Camp)
- The Little Men (Joseph E. Kelleam)
- The Peacemakers (Curtis W. Casewit)
- The Swordsman of Mars (Otis Adelbert Kline)
- Wall of Serpents (L. Sprague de Camp) and (Fletcher Pratt)

1961

- Believers' World (Robert W. Lowndes)
- Collision Course (Robert Silverberg)
- Destiny's Orbit (David Grinnell)
- Island in the Sky (Manly Wade Wellman)
- Planet of Peril (Otis Adelbert Kline)
- Sons of the Wolf (Adam Lukens)
- The Drums of Tapajos (Colonel S. P. Meek)
- The Memory Bank (Wallace West)
- The Outlaws of Mars (Otis Adelbert Kline)
- The Rim of Space (A. Bertram Chandler)
- The Runaway World (Stanton A. Coblentz)
- Troyana (Colonel S. P. Meek)

1962

- Alien Planet (Fletcher Pratt)
- Armageddon 2419 A.D. (Philip Francis Nowlan)
- Outposts in Space (Wallace West)
- Prince of Peril (Otis Adelbert Kline)
- Tam, Son of the Tiger (Otis Adelbert Kline)
- The Dark Planet (J. Hunter Holly)
- The Glass Cage (Adam Lukens)
- The Perfect Planet (Evelyn E. Smith)
- The Search for Zei (L. Sprague de Camp)
- The World Within (Adam Lukens)
- Walk Up the Sky (Robert Moore Williams)

1963

- Alien World (Adam Lukens)
- Bridge to Yesterday (E. L. Arch)
- Eevalu (Adam Lukens)
- Full Circle (Bruce Ariss)
- River of Time (Wallace West)
- The Atom Conspiracy (Jeff Sutton)
- The Gray Aliens (Joan Hunter Holly)
- The Hand of Zei (L. Sprague de Camp)
- The Men from Arcturus (Russ Winterbotham)
- The Star Men (Oscar J. Friend)
- Three Steps Spaceward (Frank B. Long)

1964

- Glory Planet (A. Bertram Chandler)
- Mission to a Star (Frank Belknap Long)
- Planet of Death (E. L. Arch)
- The Deathstones (E. L. Arch)
- The Eternal Man (Charles R. Long)
- The Exile of Time (Ray Cummings)
- The Lizard Lords (Stanton A. Coblentz)
- The Martian Visitors (Frank B. Long)
- The Moon People (Stanton A. Coblentz)
- The Puppet Planet (Russ Winterbotham)
- Time Lockers (Wallace West)

1965

- Beyond the Great Oblivion (George Allan England)
- Darkness and Dawn (George Allan England)
- Enslaved Brains (Eando Binder)
- Explorers Into Infinity (Ray Cummings)
- Palos of the Dog Star Pack (J. U. Giesy)
- Polaris of the Snows (Charles B. Stilson)
- The Dark Enemy (J. Hunter Holly)
- The First Immortals (E. L. Arch)
- The Forgotten Planet (George Henry Smith)
- The Hothouse World (Fred MacIsaac)
- The Mouthpiece of Zitu (J. U. Giesy)

1966

- Claimed (Francis Stevens)
- Jason, Son of Jason (J. U. Giesy)
- Lord of Tranerica (Stanton A. Coblentz)
- Minos of Sardanes (Charles Stilson)
- The Double-Minded Man (E. L. Arch)
- The Lord of Nardos (Russ Winterbotham)
- The Mind Traders (J. Hunter Holly)
- The People of the Abyss (George Allan England)
- The Time Chariot (T. Earl Hickey)
- When the Red King Woke (Joseph E. Kelleam)

1967

- Destination: Saturn (Lin Carter) and (David Grinnell)
- Doomed Planet (Lee Sheldon)
- Druids' World (George Henry Smith)
- Out of the Abyss (George Allan England)
- Out of the Void (Leslie F. Stone)
- The Afterglow (George Allan England)
- The Crimson Capsule (Stanton A. Coblentz)
- The Everlasting Exiles (Wallace West)
- The Insect Invasion (Ray Cummings)
- The Man With Three Eyes (E. L. Arch)

1968

- Planet of Fear (Diane Detzer)
- Polaris and the Immortals (Charles B. Stilson)
- The Day the World Stopped (Stanton A. Coblentz)
- The Return of the Starships (Jorge de Reyna)
- The Stars Will Wait (Henry L. Hasse)
- The Time of the Hedrons (Jack Dennis)

== Mystery and Romance era ==
After the discontinuation of its science fiction line, Avalon specialized in mystery and romance books.

=== Romance Authors published by Avalon Books ===
- Alayne Adams
- Lois Carnell Alexander
- Joye Ames
- Jessica Andersen
- Wendy May Andrews
- Gina Ardito
- Heidi Ashworth
- Kat Attalla
- Janet Avery
- Susan Aylworth
- Patricia K. Azeltine
- Zelda Benjamin
- Alison Blake
- Amy Blizzard
- Beate Boeker
- Rebecca L. Boschee
- Loretta Brabant
- Sandra D. Bricker
- Carolyn Brown
- Mark Sydney Burk
- Ludima Gus Burton
- Christine Bush
- Kaye Calkins
- Carolann Camillo
- Carolynn Carey
- Kathy Carmichael
- Margaret Carroll
- Nell Carson
- Sheila Claydon
- Gena Cline
- Karen Cogan
- Janet Cookson
- Nina Cornett
- Annette Couch-Jareb
- Tami Cowden
- Connie Cox
- Jillian Dagg
- Sandra Dark
- Patricia DeGroot
- Roni Denholtz
- Sierra Donovan
- Laurie Alice Eakes
- Glen Ebisch
- Sandra Elzie
- Rachel Evans
- Wilma Fasano
- Sherry Lynn Ferguson
- Shellie Foltz
- Karen Frisch
- Kathleen Fuller
- Mike Gaherty
- Shelly Galloway
- Darlene Gardner
- Carol Blake Gerrond
- Sue Gibson
- Theresa Goldstrand
- Jean C. Gordon
- Lacey Green
- Sandi Haddad
- Mary Hagen
- Peggy Hansen
- Cheryl Cooke Harrington
- Amanda Harte
- Pat Hines
- Carolyn Hughey
- Phyllis Humphrey
- Carol Hutchens
- Mona Ingram
- Holly Jacobs
- Jenny Jacobs
- Noelene Jenkinson
- Cheri Jetton
- Victoria M. Johnson
- Janet Kaderli
- Veronica Kegel-Coon
- Judy Kouzel
- Linda Lattimer
- Mary Leask
- Georgie Lee
- Sheryl Leonard
- Sarita Leone
- Ann LeValley
- Cathy Liggett
- Sandra Livingston
- Kimberly Llewellyn
- CJ Love
- Judith Lown
- Tracey J. Lyons
- Gail MacMillan
- Annette Mahon
- Shirley Marks
- Blanche Marriott
- Beverly Martin-Lowry and Sue Boltz
- Ellen Gray Massey
- Carolyn Matkowsky
- Debby Mayne
- Ilsa Mayr
- Jane McBride Choate
- Elizabeth McBride
- Cathy McDavid
- Terry Zahniser McDermid
- Shelagh McEachern
- Kate McKeever
- Jilliene McKinstry
- Fran McNabb
- Nicola Merrells
- Barbara Meyers
- Kathleen Mix
- Lisa Mondello
- Nancy Morgan
- Jean Ann Moynahan
- Rosemarie Naramore
- Deborah Nolan
- Anne Norman
- Kim O'Brien
- Rebecca K. O'Connor
- Holly O'Dell
- Gerry O'Hara
- Dorothy P. O'Neill
- Robin O'Neill
- Linda L. Paisley
- Nancy J. Parra
- Alba Marie Pastorek
- Jane Myers Perrine
- Nikki Poppen
- Marilyn Prather
- Gaby Pratt
- Bernadette Pruitt
- Kathryn Quick
- Susan Ralph
- Tara Randel
- Carol Reddick
- Shirley Raye Redmond
- Heather Reed
- Sylvia Renfro
- Sarah Richmond
- Sheila Robins
- Jeanne Robinson
- Betsy Rogers
- Elizabeth Rose
- Jocelyn Saint James
- JoAnn Sands
- Lois Schwartz
- Cynthia Scott
- Stephanie Scott
- Bev Sexton
- Fran Shaff
- Marilyn Shank
- Elaine Shelabarger
- Deborah Shelley
- Mary Sheppard
- Victoria Sheringham
- Jennifer Shirk
- Nadia Shworan
- DeAnn Smallwood
- Jeanette Sparks
- Helen Spears
- Constance Sprague
- Angie Stanton
- Christina Starr
- Hazel Statham
- Julie Stone
- Norma Davis Stoyenoff
- Marlene Stringer
- Eva Swain
- Teresa Swift
- Mary Anne Taylor
- Judi Thoman
- Katrina Thomas
- Liz Thompson
- Lynn M. Turner
- Edna Van Leuven
- Joselyn Vaughn
- Joan Vincent
- Sydell Voeller
- Suzanne Walter
- Kim Watters
- Heather S. Webber
- Jan Weeks
- Sandra Wilkins
- Frances Engle Wilson
- Helen Wingo
- Donna Wright
