= Detzer =

Detzer is a surname. Notable people with the surname include:

- Diane Detzer (1930–1992), American science fiction writer
- Dorothy Detzer (1893–1981), American feminist
- Sandra Detzer (born 1980), German politician

== See also ==
- Desert
