= MYOB =

MYOB or M.Y.O.B. may refer to:

- M.Y.O.B. (album), by American singer Deborah Gibson
- M.Y.O.B. (TV series), an American comedy
- MYOB (company), an Australian multinational corporation
- MYOB (football club), a Surinamese association football club
- Mind your own business, an English phrase

== See also ==
- Mind your own business (disambiguation)
