= The Waitabits =

- Short story by Eric Frank Russell
- Country: United States
- Language: English
- Genre(s): Science fiction

Publication
- Published in: Astounding Science Fiction
- Publication date: July 1955

The Waitabits is a science fiction short story by Eric Frank Russell. Like the stories in his collection The Great Explosion, it tells of an encounter between a mighty spaceship from Earth wishing to carve out an empire, and a planet whose inhabitants frustrate that wish. The Great Explosion dealt with oddball human societies. The inhabitants here are not human and very odd by human standards.

== Plot ==
The survey ship Thunderer sets out to follow up on reports of new inhabitable planets filed by a distinctly laconic advance scout. His reports, such as they are, are factually accurate as to the classification of the planets, but consist of few words otherwise. One planet he named "Eterna" has inhabitants he named "Waitabits", and that he described simply as "unconquerable".

The Thunderer duly arrives in orbit above Eterna and surveys it from space. The scientists confirm that it is both inhabitable, and inhabited. Landing some distance from a settlement, they attempt to contact the inhabitants. To their consternation, they find that the Waitabits live on a timescale that is much slower than the human one. Communication is all but impossible. They create a strategy of leaving diagrams in the middle of public spaces for the Waitabits to interpret. However communication is not their only problem. They begin attracting crowds who cannot move out of the way of human vehicles. Returning to the ship they find that the Waitabits are headed towards it, and will soon be so close the ship cannot blast off without killing many of them. They take off and land several times, each time finding that the Waitabits are responding faster, thanks to messages from the other landing sites. Finally they abandon the planet and move on to the next one on the list.

The next planet is also described by a single word. That word is "Ugh!"

The story is characterized by humor. An example is that when the first local train passed by the ship, slow as it was it became apparent after about 20 minutes that it was going even slower and was making what to the passengers would be a panic stop. The Earthmen hoped that none of the passengers would be injured by being slung from one end of the carriage to the other.

At the end of the story the Earthmen realize that if one race could move a lot slower than humans, another race might be found which moved a lot faster - an unpleasant possibility.
