= Plus-X =

Plus-X or Plus X may refer to

- Venus Plus X, a 1960 science fiction novel written by Theodore Sturgeon
- "Plus X", a 1956 science fiction novella by Eric Frank Russell, later expanded into Next of Kin
- +×, a logo for EDM artist Martin Garrix
- +x, adding execute permission with the system call chmod as used in Unix-like operating systems.

== See also ==
- Plus-size clothing
