= Mind your own business (disambiguation) =

Mind your own business is a common English saying. It may also refer to:

== Media ==
- Mind Your Own Business (film), a 1936 American comedy film
- "Mind Your Own Business" (TSR episode), an episode of the American television sitcom That's So Raven
- "Mind Your Own Business" (song), a 1949 song by Hank Williams
- "Mind Your Own Business", a song by Living Colour from their 1993 album Stain
- "Mind Your Own Business", a song by Delta 5, covered by Chicks on Speed, Le Shok and Pigface
- Mind Your Own Business, album by Henry McCullough
- Mind Your Own Business: The Battle for Personal Privacy, a 1995 book by Gini Graham Scott

== Other ==
- Mind-your-own-business is one of several popular names for a herb with the official name Soleirolia soleirolii

== See also ==
- Mind your business (disambiguation)
- MYOB (disambiguation)
- Mine Your Own Business; a 2006 film
