= A wigwam for a goose's bridle =

English phrase

A wigwam for a goose's bridle is a phrase, meaning something absurd or a nonsense object, or latterly "none of your business". It is an old English phrase from the United Kingdom which later found particular favour in Australia, where its first recorded use is in 1917, and also in New Zealand. An obscure variation has been attributed to the mid-1900s in Canada's Nova Scotia province. It has been reported that mundane household enquiries like "what's for dinner?" could draw the response "bits for gooses' bridles".

== UK origins ==
An early recorded use is found in an 1836 article in The New Monthly Magazine, where the phrase is used by an English sailor whose ship was berthed in Calcutta.

Originally, the phrase was "a whim-wham for a goose's bridle", with "whim-wham" a word meaning "a fanciful or fantastic object". The phrase was deliberately absurd as a goose would never wear a bridle. Folk etymology converted the word "whim-wham"—a word that was no longer much used—to "wigwam", an Ojibwa word for a domed single-room dwelling used by Native Americans. This change retained the phrase's absurd meaning and sense.

== Australian use ==
In Australia, a common usage is in response to an inquiry such as Q. "What are you making?", A. "A wigwam for a goose's bridle". The rejoinder was a code for "Mind your own business" and children acquired this pragmatic knowledge after repeated discourse with their parents ended with this response. It was a common family saying.

The phrase is believed to be less popular than it once was.

== Other variations of the phrase ==
- "Whim wham for ducks to sit on." (stated by a woman of English heritage, first of six born (1907) in the US, in Rock Springs, Wyoming)
- "Whim whams to wind the sun up." (said by an Englishman of Chester, Cheshire in the years 1930–1940)
