= Day of the Giants =

1959 novel by Lester del Rey

- Cover from first edition
- Author: Lester del Rey
- Cover artist: Ed Emshwiller
- Language: English
- Genre: Fantasy
- Publisher: Avalon Books
- Publication date: 1959
- Publication place: United States
- Media type: Print (hardcover)
- Pages: 224

Day of the Giants is a fantasy novel by American writer Lester del Rey, expanded from his novella "When the World Tottered," first published in Fantastic Adventures, vol. 12, no. 12, December 1950. As a novel, it was first published in hardcover by Avalon Books in February 1959, and in paperback by Airmont Books in March 1964. The Airmont edition was reprinted in December 1972 and January 1976. Wildside Press reissued the novel as an ebook in February 2014, and in trade paperback in May 2022. The trade edition includes a bonus del Rey short story, "The One-Eyed Man," originally published under the pseudonym Philip St. John in Astounding Science Fiction, vol. 35, No. 3, May 1945. The book has also appeared in Italian and Czech translation.

== Plot summary ==
Twin brothers Leif and Lee Svensen, Americans of Scandinavian descent, find themselves caught up in the affairs of the supposedly mythical Norse gods—who, they discover, are very real, denizens of other dimensions who interacted with humanity in past ages. An unusual cold snap presages the predicted Fimbulwinter, when the Aesir and the Frost Giants will fight each other in Ragnarök, the final battle, with Midgard—Earth—as the prize. To load the dice in their favor, the Aesir arrange for the Svensens to be carried off to their home dimension Asgard, hoping to benefit from their modern knowledge. Odin, Thor, and the other principal gods favor strong, adventurous Lee, while clever Loki backs brainy, sensible Leif.

But the Aesir are divided among themselves, and may prove unable to stave off the dreaded Day of the Giants. They have been riven into factions due to the age-old prophecies of the end times that guide them. The older, more traditionalist gods fated to die in Ragnarök are undermined by their younger heirs, who are to survive and avenge them. The younger gods seem suspiciously overeager for their inheritance, presuming on their heroic destiny. Loki, whose counsel is indispensable, is nonetheless distrusted by all due to his destiny as fated betrayer of the Aesir. Leif suspects the prophecies of having been rigged to favor some gods over others.

Moreover, Leif soon realizes that the entire outcome of the struggle is also problematic; whether the Aesir, humanity's purported friends, or the Giants, their avowed enemies, come out on top, Earth will suffer tyranny from the victors. He and his brother, caught in the middle, could tip the balance between factions and foes alike. He questions what path will prove least disastrous for humanity. The stakes are also personal for him as he does fall in love with a goddess.

== Reception ==
Frederik Pohl, writing in If, was dismissive of the book, noting that the publisher "seems to be pursuing a policy of printing the worst books of the best writers in science fiction," and moreover had misprinted the name of the author as "Lester del Ray." He deemed it "incredible but true that this book is by the man who wrote Nerves. Maybe the misspelling of "del Rey" on the jacket isn't an accident but a disguise.

P. Schuyler Miller in Astounding Science Fiction wrote "This is Lester del Rey making like Poul Anderson making like de Camp and Pratt, without the whimsey. ... and you're quite free to call it open fantasy, except that the author pretends that the Norse gods, dwarfs, frost-giants, and all the rest are real and alive in some other-dimensional continuum," with the "seeming magic ... neatly explained away. But this isn't del Rey's best vein." Reconsidering the novel when it was issued in paperback, he seems to have modified his opinion, observing that "Avalon Books published this in 1959, and it was better than most of the books they've had since."

Floyd C. Gale in Galaxy Magazine, while only giving the story a two star rating, nonetheless commends its author for coming to grips with the "tough chore" of recasting his doom-filed mythological source material as "a light fantasy" by "plung[ing] through his story in lickety-split fashion — let gods and giants alike fall where they may."

The book was also reviewed by Paul C. Allen in Fantasy Crossroads November 1977.
