= Tau Sigma =

American collegiate honor society

- ΤΣ
- Founded: 1999; 26 years ago Auburn University
- Type: Honor
- Affiliation: Independent
- Status: Active
- Emphasis: Transfer students
- Scope: National
- Colors: Burgundy and Gold
- Symbol: Three strands of wheat
- Publication: Tau Sigma Harvest
- Chapters: 225+
- Headquarters: 145 East Magnolia Avenue Suite 20; Auburn, Alabama 36830; United States
- Website: www.tausigmanhs.org

Tau Sigma (ΤΣ) is an American honor society for university transfer students. It was established at Auburn University in 1999 and has spread to include more than 225 chapters.

== History ==
Tau Sigma was established in 1999 at Auburn University in Auburn, Alabama. It was incorporated as a nonprofit organization in 1999. Part of the impetus for the creation of the organization was to provide a social support network to transfer students.

Its national headquarters are at 145 East Magnolia Avenue in Auburn, Alabama.

== Symbols ==
The Greek letters Tau and Sigma where chosen to stand for "transition" and "scholarship".

Tau Sigma's emblem is the Greek letters ΤΣ on top of three strands of wheat. The society's coat of arms is a red shield, bearing the emblem; below is a banner with the name Tau Sigma. The red color symbolizes the courage needed to face transitions. The wheat stands for the "harvesting of success in all future endeavors".

The society's colors are burgundy and gold. Its honor cord is also burgundy and gold. Its publication is The Tau Sigma Harvest.

== Membership ==
Specific membership criteria are established by individual chapters; in general, a student must have transferred from one university to another university with one year's worth of academic credits already earned a 3.5 or better grade point average during the first term of enrollment at their new institution.

== Activities ==
In addition to chapter-specific activities, the Tau Sigma national organization awards academic scholarships to Tau Sigma members. In 2013, it provided 105 scholarships totaling $36,500 in value.

== Chapters ==
Tau Sigma has chartered more than 225 chapters. In the following list, active chapters are indicated in bold and inactive chapters are in italics.

Chapter	Founding academic year	Institution	Location	Status	References
**Alpha**	1999	Auburn University	Auburn, Alabama	Active	
**Beta**	2000–01	University at Buffalo	Buffalo, New York	Active	
**Gamma**	2001–02	Kent State University	Kent, Ohio	Active	
**Delta**	2001–02	University of Florida	Gainesville, Florida	Active	
**Epsilon**	2001–02	State University of New York at Oswego	Oswego, New York	Active	
**Zeta**	2001–02	University of Central Florida	Orlando, Florida	Active	
**Eta**	2001–02	James Madison University	Harrisonburg, Virginia	Active	
**Theta**	2001–02	University of South Dakota	Vermillion, South Dakota	Active	
Iota					
**Kappa**	2002–03	University of North Texas	Denton, Texas	Active	
**Lambda**	2002–03	University of Nebraska–Lincoln	Lincoln, Nebraska	Active	
**Mu**	2003–04	University of South Carolina	Columbia, South Carolina	Active	
**Nu**	2003–04	Hilbert College	Hamburg, New York	Active	
**Xi**	2003–04	University of Nevada, Reno	Reno, Nevada	Active	
**Omicron**	2003–04	University of California, Irvine	Irvine, California	Active	
**Pi**	2003–04	State University of New York at Cortland	Cortland, New York	Active	
**Rho**	2003–04	Georgia State University	Atlanta, Georgia	Active	
**Sigma**	2003–04	Pittsburg State University	Pittsburg, Kansas	Active	
**Tau**	2003–04	University of Hawaiʻi at Mānoa	Honolulu, Hawaii	Active	
**Upsilon**	2004–05	University of Akron	Akron, Ohio	Active	
**Phi**	2004–05	Florida International University	Westchester, Florida	Active	
**Chi**	2004–05	University of Illinois Urbana-Champaign	Champaign, Illinois	Active	
**Psi**	2004–05	Georgia Southern University	Statesboro, Georgia	Active	
**Omega**	2004–05	University of Toledo	Toledo, Ohio	Active	
**Alpha Alpha**	2004–05	Oregon State University	Corvallis, Oregon	Active	
**Alpha Beta**	2004–05	Utah State University	Logan, Utah	Active	
**Alpha Gamma**	2004–05	University of North Dakota	Grand Forks, North Dakota	Active	
**Alpha Delta**	2004–05	University of Missouri–St. Louis	St. Louis, Missouri	Active	
**Alpha Epsilon**	2005–06	Old Dominion University	Norfolk, Virginia	Active	
**Alpha Zeta**	2005–06	Clemson University	Clemson, South Carolina	Active	
**Alpha Eta**	2005–06	University of Texas at El Paso	El Paso, Texas	Active	
**Alpha Theta**	2005–06	Portland State University	Portland, Oregon	Active	
**Alpha Iota**	2005–06	Oklahoma State University–Tulsa	Tulsa, Oklahoma	Active	
**Alpha Kappa**	2005–06	Oklahoma State University	Stillwater, Oklahoma	Active	
**Alpha Lambda**	2005–06	University of Louisville	Louisville, Kentucky	Active	
**Alpha Mu**	2005–06	University of Houston–Downtown	Houston, Texas	Active	
**Alpha Nu**	2005–06	Middle Tennessee State University	Murfreesboro, Tennessee	Active	
**Alpha Xi**	2005–06	Slippery Rock University	Slippery Rock, Pennsylvania	Active	
**Alpha Omicron**	2005–06	University of Illinois Chicago	Chicago, Illinois	Active	
**Alpha Pi**	2005–06	Virginia Commonwealth University	Richmond, Virginia	Active	
**Alpha Rho**	2005–06	College of Charleston	Charleston, South Carolina	Active	
**Alpha Sigma**	2005–06	Indiana University Southeast	New Albany, Indiana	Active	
**Alpha Tau**	2006	University of Missouri	Columbia, Missouri	Active	
Alpha Upsilon					
**Alpha Phi**	2006–07	University of Connecticut	Storrs, Connecticut	Active	
**Alpha Chi**	2006–07	California State University, Northridge	Northridge, Los Angeles, California	Active	
**Alpha Psi**	2006–07	University of Maryland, Baltimore County	Catonsville, Maryland	Active	
**Alpha Omega**	2006–07	Binghamton University	Vestal, New York	Active	
**Beta Alpha**	2006–07	University of California, Riverside	Riverside, California	Active	
**Beta Beta**	2007–08	University at Albany, SUNY	Albany, New York	Active	
**Beta Gamma**	2007–08	University of North Carolina at Chapel Hill	Chapel Hill, North Carolina	Active	
**Beta Delta**	2007–08	State University of New York at Fredonia	Fredonia, New York	Active	
**Beta Epsilon**	2007–08	Washington State University	Pullman, Washington	Active	
**Beta Zeta**	2007–08	University of North Carolina at Charlotte	Charlotte, North Carolina	Active	
**Beta Eta**	2007–08	University of Maryland, College Park	College Park, Maryland	Active	
**Beta Theta**	2007–08	University of Texas at Austin	Austin, Texas	Active	
**Beta Iota**	2008–09	University of Alabama	Tuscaloosa, Alabama	Active	
**Beta Kappa**	2008–09	University of North Carolina Wilmington	Wilmington, North Carolina	Active	
**Beta Lambda**	2008	Adelphi University	Garden City, New York	Active	
**Beta Mu**	2009	University of North Texas at Dallas	Dallas, Texas	Active	
**Beta Nu**	2008–09	George Mason University	Fairfax, Virginia	Active	
**Beta Xi**	2008–09	Liberty University	Lynchburg, Virginia	Active	
**Beta Omicron**	2008–09	Fayetteville State University	Fayetteville, North Carolina	Active	
**Beta Pi**	2008–09	East Tennessee State University	Johnson City, Tennessee	Active	
**Beta Rho**	2008–09	University of Texas at Dallas	Richardson, Texas	Active	
**Beta Sigma**	2009	University of Michigan–Dearborn	Dearborn, Michigan	Active	
**Beta Tau**	2008–09	University of Southern Mississippi	Hattiesburg, Mississippi	Active	
**Beta Upsilon**	2008–09	Northern Illinois University	DeKalb, Illinois	Active	
**Beta Phi**	2008–09	University of South Florida	Tampa, Florida	Active	
**Beta Chi**	2008–09	SUNY Brockport	Brockport, New York	Active	
**Beta Psi**	2009–10	Baylor University	Waco, Texas	Active	
**Beta Omega**	2009–10	University of Arizona	Tucson, Arizona	Active	
**Gamma Alpha**	2009–10	Austin Peay State University	Clarksville, Tennessee	Active	
**Gamma Beta**	2009	Southern Methodist University	Dallas, Texas	Active	
**Gamma Gamma**	2009–10	Louisiana State University	Baton Rouge, Louisiana	Active	
**Gamma Delta**	2009–10	Loyola University Chicago	Chicago, Illinois	Active	
**Gamma Epsilon**	2009–10	Colorado State University	Fort Collins, Colorado	Active	
**Gamma Zeta**	2009–10	Towson University	Towson, Maryland	Active	
**Gamma Eta**	2009–10	Texas A&M University–Kingsville	Kingsville, Texas	Active	
**Gamma Theta**	2009–10	Ohio University	Athens, Ohio	Active	
**Gamma Iota**	2010–11	College of Saint Rose	Albany, New York	Active	
**Gamma Kappa**	2010–11	Rhode Island College	Providence, Rhode Island	Active	
**Gamma Lambda**	2010–11	Oakland University	Rochester, Michigan	Active	
**Gamma Mu**	2010–11	Seattle University	Seattle, Washington	Active	
**Gamma Nu**	2010–11	Appalachian State University	Boone, North Carolina	Active	
**Gamma Xi**	2010–11	Rutgers University–New Brunswick	New Brunswick, New Jersey	Active	
**Gamma Omicron**	2010–11	University of North Carolina at Pembroke	Pembroke, North Carolina	Active	
**Gamma Pi**	2010–11	Le Moyne College	DeWitt, New York	Active	
**Gamma Rho**	2010–11	University of Tennessee	Knoxville, Tennessee	Active	
**Gamma Sigma**	2010–11	East Carolina University	Greenville, North Carolina	Active	
**Gamma Tau**	2010–11	North Carolina A&T State University	Greensboro, North Carolina	Active	
**Gamma Upsilon**	2010–11	University of New Haven	West Haven, Connecticut	Active	
**Gamma Phi**	2010–11	University of Wyoming	Laramie, Wyoming	Active	
**Gamma Chi**	2010–11	North Carolina Central University	Durham, North Carolina	Active	
**Gamma Psi**	2010–11	University of California, Los Angeles	Los Angeles, California	Active	
**Gamma Omega**	2010–11	Robert Morris University	Moon Township, Pennsylvania	Active	
**Delta Alpha**	2010–11	University of South Alabama	Mobile, Alabama	Active	
**Delta Beta**	2010–11	Midwestern State University	Wichita Falls, Texas	Active	
**Delta Gamma**	March 2012	Morgan State University	Baltimore, Maryland	Active	
**Delta Delta**	2010–11	Governors State University	University Park, Illinois	Active	
**Delta Epsilon**	2010–11	Texas Wesleyan University	Fort Worth, Texas	Active	
**Delta Epsilon**	2011–12	Webster University	Webster Groves, Missouri	Active	
Delta Zeta					
**Delta Eta**	2010–11	Saint Louis University	St. Louis, Missouri	Active	
**Delta Theta**	2011–12	Fort Hays State University	Hays, Kansas	Active	
**Delta Iota**	2011–12	Nova Southeastern University	Fort Lauderdale, Florida	Active	
**Delta Kappa**	2011–12	Northern Arizona University	Flagstaff, Arizona	Active	
**Delta Lambda**	2011–12	Illinois State University	Normal, Illinois	Active	
**Delta Mu**	2011–12	Rowan University	Glassboro, New Jersey	Active	
**Delta Nu**	2011–12	Winthrop University	Rock Hill, South Carolina	Active	
**Delta Xi**	2011–12	New Jersey City University	Jersey City, New Jersey	Active	
Delta Omicron					
**Delta Pi**	2011–12	University of Pittsburgh	Pittsburgh, Pennsylvania	Active	
**Delta Rho**	2011–12	Framingham State University	Framingham, Massachusetts	Active	
**Delta Sigma**	2011–12	George Washington University	Washington, D.C.	Active	
**Delta Tau**	2011–12	University of Southern California	Los Angeles, California	Active	
Delta Upsilon					
**Delta Phi**	2011–12	American University	Washington, D.C.	Active	
**Delta Chi**	2011–12	Virginia Tech	Blacksburg, Virginia	Active	
**Delta Psi**	2011–12	Texas State University	San Marcos, Texas	Active	
**Delta Omega**	2011–12	University of New Orleans	New Orleans, Louisiana	Active	
**Epsilon Alpha**	2011–12	University of Georgia	Athens, Georgia	Active	
**Epsilon Beta**	October 2013	Rutgers University–Newark	Newark, New Jersey	Active	
**Epsilon Gamma**	2012–13	University of Iowa	Iowa City, Iowa	Active	
**Epsilon Delta**	2012–13	Angelo State University	San Angelo, Texas	Active	
**Epsilon Epsilon**	2012–13	Eastern Kentucky University	Richmond, Kentucky	Active	
Epsilon Zeta					
**Epsilon Eta**	2012–13	Jackson State University	Jackson, Mississippi	Active	
**Epsilon Theta**	2012–13	University of Texas at San Antonio	San Antonio, Texas	Active	
**Epsilon Iota**	2012–13	University of Wisconsin–Eau Claire	Eau Claire, Wisconsin	Active	
Epsilon Kappa					
**Epsilon Lambda**	2012–13	Western Carolina University	Cullowhee, North Carolina	Active	
**Epsilon Mu**	2012–13	Winston-Salem State University	Winston-Salem, North Carolina	Active	
**Epsilon Nu**	2012–13	Minnesota State University, Mankato	Mankato, Minnesota	Active	
**Epsilon Xi**	2012–13	University of Utah	Salt Lake City, Utah	Active	
**Epsilon Omicron**	2012–13	University of Wisconsin–Milwaukee	Milwaukee, Wisconsin	Active	
**Epsilon Pi**	2012–13	Indiana University Indianapolis	Indianapolis, Indiana	Active	
**Epsilon Rho**	2013–14	University of Texas at Arlington	Arlington, Texas	Active	
**Epsilon Sigma**	2013–14	University of Massachusetts Boston	Boston, Massachusetts	Active	
**Epsilon Tau**	2013–14	University of Minnesota	Minneapolis, Minnesota	Active	
**Epsilon Upsilon**	2013–14	Western Illinois University	Macomb, Illinois	Active	
**Epsilon Phi**	2013–14	Lehman College	Bronx, New York	Active	
**Epsilon Chi**	2013–14	University of Nebraska Omaha	Omaha, Nebraska	Active	
**Epsilon Psi**	September 2014	Northern Kentucky University	Highland Heights, Kentucky	Active	
**Epsilon Omega**	2013–14	University of Wisconsin–Stout	Menomonie, Wisconsin	Active	
**Zeta Alpha**	2013–14	Ithaca College	Ithaca, New York	Active	
**Zeta Beta**	2014–15	William Paterson University	Wayne, New Jersey	Active	
**Zeta Gamma**	2014–15	University of Illinois Springfield	Springfield, Illinois	Active	
**Zeta Delta**	2015	Indiana University Bloomington	Bloomington, Indiana	Active	
**Zeta Epsilon**	2014–15	Pace University Pleasantville	Pleasantville, New York	Active	
**Zeta Zeta**	2014–15	Buffalo State University	Buffalo, New York	Active	
**Zeta Eta**	2014–15	University of Massachusetts Lowell	Lowell, Massachusetts	Active	
**Zeta Theta**	2014–15	Pace University		Active	
**Zeta Iota**	2014–15	Millersville University of Pennsylvania	Millersville, Pennsylvania	Active	
**Zeta Kappa**	2014–15	Shepherd University	Shepherdstown, West Virginia	Active	
**Zeta Lambda**	2014–15	Florida Atlantic University	Boca Raton, Florida	Active	
Zeta Mu					
**Zeta Nu**	2014–15	Monmouth University	West Long Branch, New Jersey	Active	
**Zeta Xi**	2014–15	University of Lynchburg	Lynchburg, Virginia	Active	
**Zeta Omicron**	2015–16	Long Island University	Brooklyn, New York	Active	
**Zeta Pi**	2015–16	Coastal Carolina University	Conway, South Carolina	Active	
**Zeta Rho**	2015–16	University of Arkansas	Fayetteville, Arkansas	Active	
**Zeta Sigma**	2015	Morehead State University	Morehead, Kentucky	Active	
**Zeta Tau**	2015–16	Saint Xavier University	Chicago, Illinois	Active	
**Zeta Upsilon**	2015–16	Cleveland State University	Cleveland, Ohio	Active	
**Zeta Phi**	2015–16	North Carolina State University	Raleigh, North Carolina	Active	
**Zeta Chi**	2015–16	Western Michigan University	Kalamazoo, Michigan	Active	
**Zeta Psi**	April 30, 2014	Loyola Marymount University	Los Angeles, California	Active	
**Zeta Omega**	2015–16	State University of New York at Old Westbury	Old Westbury, New York	Active	
**Eta Alpha**	2015–16	University of South Florida St. Petersburg	St. Petersburg, Florida	Active	
Eta Beta					
**Eta Gamma**	2015–16	Florida A&M University	Tallahassee, Florida	Active	
**Eta Delta**	2016–17	Southern Connecticut State University	New Haven, Connecticut	Active	
**Eta Epsilon**	2016–17	California State University, East Bay	Hayward, California	Active	
**Eta Zeta**	2016–17	Texas A&M University	College Station, Texas	Active	
**Eta Eta**	2016–17	University of Tennessee at Martin	Martin, Tennessee	Active	
**Eta Theta**	2016–17	Westfield State University	Westfield, Massachusetts	Active	
**Eta Iota**	2016–17	University of North Carolina at Asheville	Asheville, North Carolina	Active	
**Eta Kappa**	2016–17	Sonoma State University	Rohnert Park, California	Active	
**Eta Lambda**	2016–17	Missouri State University	Springfield, Missouri	Active	
**Eta Mu**	December 2016	Kutztown University of Pennsylvania	Kutztown, Pennsylvania	Active	
**Eta Nu**	2017–18	Ramapo College	Mahwah, New Jersey	Active	
Eta Xi					
**Eta Omicron**	2015	University of North Carolina at Greensboro	Greensboro, North Carolina	Active	
Eta Pi					
Eta Rho					
**Eta Sigma**	2017	San Diego State University	San Diego, California	Active	
**Eta Tau**	2017–18	University of North Georgia, Dahlonega Campus	Dahlonega, Georgia	Active	
**Eta Upsilon**	2017–18	The New School	Greenwich Village, New York City, New York	Active	
**Eta Phi**	2017–18	McKendree University	Lebanon, Illinois	Active	
**Eta Chi**	2017–18	Jacksonville State University	Jacksonville, Alabama	Active	
**Eta Psi**	2017–18	University of California, San Diego	San Diego, California	Active	
**Eta Omega**	2018–19	University of Colorado Boulder	Boulder, Colorado	Active	
**Theta Alpha**	2018–19	Chicago State University	Chicago, Illinois	Active	
**Theta Beta**	2018–19	West Virginia State University	Institute, West Virginia	Active	
**Theta Gamma**	2018–19	Augusta University	Augusta, Georgia	Active	
Theta Delta					
**Theta Epsilon**	2018–19	California State University, Channel Islands	Camarillo, California	Active	
**Theta Zeta**	2018–19	State University of New York at Oneonta	Oneonta, New York	Active	
**Theta Eta**	2019	University of Miami	Coral Gables, Florida	Active	
**Theta Theta**	2018–19	North Central College	Naperville, Illinois	Active	
**Theta Iota**	2018–19	University of California, Santa Barbara	Santa Barbara, California	Active	
**Theta Kappa**	2018–19	Texas A&M University–San Antonio	San Antonio, Texas	Active	
**Theta Lambda**	2019–20	California State University, Monterey Bay	Seaside, California	Active	
**Theta Mu**	2019–20	University of Cincinnati	Cincinnati, Ohio	Active	
**Theta Nu**	2019–20	Eastern Michigan University	Ypsilanti, Michigan	Active	
**Theta Xi**	2019–20	Montclair State University	Montclair, New Jersey	Active	
**Theta Omicron**	2019–20	Delaware Valley University	Doylestown, Pennsylvania	Active	
**Theta Pi**	2019–20	Kean University	Elizabeth, New Jersey	Active	
**Theta Rho**	2019–20	St. Cloud State University	St. Cloud, Minnesota	Active	
**Theta Sigma**	2020–21	Arizona State University	Tempe, Arizona	Active	
Theta Tau					
**Theta Upsilon**	2020–21	Penn State Berks	Spring Township, Pennsylvania	Active	
Theta Phi					
**Theta Chi**	2020–21	Universities at Shady Grove		Active	
**Theta Chi**	2020–21	University of Delaware	Newark, Delaware	Active	
**Theta Psi**	2020–21	University of South Florida Sarasota–Manatee	Sarasota, Florida	Active	
**Theta Omega**	2021–22	California State University, Dominguez Hills	Carson, California	Active	
Iota Alpha					
**Iota Beta**	2021–22	New Jersey Institute of Technology	Newark, New Jersey	Active	
**Iota Gamma**	2021–22	LIU Brooklyn	New York City, New York	Active	
**Iota Delta**	2021–22	Northeastern State University	Tahlequah, Oklahoma	Active	
**Iota Epsilon**	2021–22	Iowa State University	Ames, Iowa	Active	
**Iota Zeta**	2021–22	University of Wisconsin–Madison	Madison, Wisconsin	Active	
**Iota Eta**	2022	Wright State University	Fairborn, Ohio	Active	
**Iota Theta**	2022–23	University of New Mexico	Albuquerque, New Mexico	Active	
**Iota Iota**	2022–23	Auburn University at Montgomery	Montgomery, Alabama	Active	
**Iota Kappa**	2022	San Diego State University Global Campus	San Diego, California	Active	
**Iota Lambda**	2022–23	California State University, Sacramento	Sacramento, California	Active	
**Iota Mu**	2022–23	Utica University	Utica, New York	Active	
**Iota Nu**	2022–23	University of Rhode Island	Kingston, Rhode Island	Active	
**Iota Xi**	2024	Florida State University	Tallahassee, Florida	Active	
**Iota Omicron**	2024	University of South Carolina Upstate	Valley Falls, South Carolina	Active	
**Iota Pi**	2024	Holy Family University	Philadelphia, Pennsylvania	Active	
**Iota Rho**	2024	St. John’s University	Queens, New York City, New York	Active	
**Iota Sigma**	2024	University of Rhode Island	Kingston, Rhode Island	Active	
**Iota Tau**	2024–25	The College of New Jersey	Ewing Township, New Jersey	Active	
**Iota Upsilon**	2024	State University of New York at Plattsburgh	Plattsburgh, New York	Active	
**Iota Phi**	2024	University of the District of Columbia	Washington, D.C.	Active	
