= Three to Conquer =

1956 novel by Eric Frank Russell

Three to Conquer is a novel by Eric Frank Russell published in 1956.

== Plot summary ==
Three to Conquer is a novel in which a telepath fights back against alien invaders that have the ability to take control of people.

== Reception ==
Dave Langford reviewed Three to Conquer for White Dwarf #99, compared this book to Sentinels From Space, describing it as "More modest and - on its own level- successful [...] a fast-paced thriller with a lone, wisecracking telepath battling alien virus invaders who infect and (cf The Puppet Masters) generally Take Over people."
