= Deep Space (collection) =

1954 collection of short science-fiction stories by Eric Frank Russell

- Dust-jacket from the first edition
- Author: Eric Frank Russell
- Cover artist: Mel Hunter
- Language: English
- Genre: Science fiction short stories
- Publisher: Fantasy Press
- Publication date: 1954
- Publication place: United States
- Media type: Print (hardback)
- Pages: 249 pp
- OCLC: 1142714

Deep Space is a collection of short science-fiction stories by the British writer Eric Frank Russell. It was first published by Fantasy Press in 1954 in an edition of 2,257 copies. The stories originally appeared in the magazines Thrilling Wonder Stories, Other Worlds, Astounding, Galaxy Science Fiction, Imagination and Blue book.

== Contents ==
- "First Person Singular"
- "The Witness"
- "Last Blast"
- "Homo Saps"
- "The Timid Tiger"
- "A Little Oil"
- "Rainbow’s End"
- "The Undecided"
- "Second Genesis"

== Reception ==
Anthony Boucher praised the selection of stories, saying they had been "chosen so as to form a cohesive series of comments upon human (and extra-human) relationships in space flight and colonization." P. Schuyler Miller declared Deep Space to be "one of the most satisfying one-author collections of the past year, and one of Fantasy Press' all-time best selections."
