= Solomon's Stone =

1942 novel by L. Sprague de Camp

- Dust-jacket for Solomon's Stone
- Author: L. Sprague de Camp
- Cover artist: Ric Binkley
- Language: English
- Genre: Fantasy
- Publisher: Avalon
- Publication date: 1957
- Publication place: United States
- Media type: Print (hardback)
- Pages: 224

Solomon's Stone is a fantasy novel by American writer L. Sprague de Camp. It was first published in the magazine Unknown Worlds in June 1942. It was reprinted in the Summer 1949 issue of the British edition of Unknown, and then published in book form by Avalon Books in 1957.

After an unintentionally successful demon-summoning, accountant Prosper Nash finds himself on the astral plane, inhabiting the body of Jean-Prospere, Chevalier de Néche—the swashbuckling cavalier he likes to imagine himself as—and in a New York filled with characters from similar wish-fulfillment daydreams of other mundane souls. The demon is possessing his body on a mundane plane, and he attempts to find his way back. This involves the Shamir, the Solomon's Stone of the title, and plentiful swashbuckling adventure, and a plot in which Prosper Nash's accounting abilities prove as useful as Chevalier de Néche's athletic ones.

== Plot summary ==
When Montague Allen Stark, with the assistance of friends, attempts to summon a devil, he quite unexpectedly succeeds: Bechard possesses Prosper Nash's body and sends his soul to the astral plane. Nash awakes in a cavalier's body, with no memory, but with the old reflexes. This gets him shortly involved in a fight, and he meets up with Arizona Bill Averoff, who does not remember him, but is the image of his friend Bill Averoff, an avid Western reader. He also learns that the society is in the throes of a war with the Wotanists—or Voties, as they are commonly called (in the original 1940s magazine version, these characters are referred to as "Arries" or "Aryans", and appear to be the astral products of daydreaming German émigrés in the New York of the time).

Spending the night reveals his name, as he signs it from habit, and more importantly, the existence of the Shamir. After a failed attempt to steal it, a fellow cavalier drags him back a club, which contains letters that reveal more of his past to him. In particular, he knows Alicia Dido Woodson, the double of Alice Woodson, present when the demon was summoned, but tracking her down reveals that she was kidnapped.

An unremembered feud with Athos de Lilly catches up with him, and he ends up in jail, where he hears of a wizard, Merlin Apollonius Stark—the equivalent of Montague Stark—and resolves to get his assistance in obtaining the Shamir.

In court the next day, he is offered an enlistment in the army. He receives orders to carry a message but also news from a private detective named Reginald Vance Kramer (apparently the astral self of a daydreaming would-be Philo Vance) that Alicia was kidnapped by Sultan Arslan Bey. Passing off the message to Arizona Bill Averoff, he bluffs his way into the sultan's castle by posing as a representative of the city's Comptroller. He finds that the sultan is Bob Lanby, in reality a bachelor and clerk at the YMCA. When the Romans and Voties attack, he convinces the sultan to send him to convey the harem and treasure to safety.

Having gotten the girls to safety (in their opinion, not the sultan's) and taken a share of the treasure, he convinces Merlin Apollonius Stark to help him. He learns that the message was woefully misdelivered, and after an abortive anarchist uprising, New York City is in the middle of a battle in which the Voties have gained the upper hand. With help from Alicia, he does gain the Shamir, but when they are cornered by Voties, he has Alicia use it to escape to the mundane world.

Execution the next morning is stopped by an invasion of creatures dreamed up by Montague Stark. Alicia's attempt to contact him was successful.

Tukiphat, the owner of the Shamir, demands it of him, and Prosper explains the circumstances. Tukiphat summons Bechard to the astral plane, and sends Prosper back to deal with Bechard's connection there.

The Shamir, which could return him, is still on the mundane plane, but so is Alicia, and Prosper has her use it to return herself to the astral plane. He goes to visit Montague Stark, and finds him throwing away his magical books. Prosper takes them: he may never be reunited with Alicia, but he intends to try.

== Setting ==
The setting possesses occasional "soul-less ones": people dreamed up to fill the minor roles in other people's daydreams. However, there are not enough to fill up the gaps. As a consequence:

- A sultan with a fantasy harem of 365 women is invariably trolling for more women
- The army is full of generals, who form the lowest ranks, and is commanded by the sole private.
- A hotel is unable to hire any help because no one daydreams of working in a hotel.
- The Interplanetary Patrolmen have no Interplanetary Patrol for lack of space traffic, and an attempt to build a spaceship founders on their inability to agree on who would be in charge.
- Automatic weapons are unavailable, because they are too difficult to make by hand, and no one would build the machinery to manufacture them.

== Reception ==
Critically, the novel has been rated as rather minor de Camp. Anthony Boucher called it "[s]lighter and sketchier than de Camp's LEST DARKNESS FALL or THE WHEELS OF IF, [but] still a lively and entertaining adventure-cum-satire." P. Schuyler Miller concurred, assessing it as "slight, but fun," not quite in the same league as the fantasies the author had written in collaboration; "I wish I knew what Fletcher Pratt brought to the incomparable Harold Shea 'Incomplete Enchanter' yarns, because this isn't quite the same." Frederik Pohl called the book "[f]ast, entertaining, rather slight."

Galaxy reviewer Floyd C. Gale panned the novel; describing himself as a de Camp follower, he noted that the book, "[w]hile not quite making me an official deserter from his ranks, [did] succeed in removing some of the gilt from an idol." He felt that "de Camp has done better in the past with less."

More recently, Brian M. Stableford called it "perhaps the best" of the solo fantasies de Camp wrote during the period of his collaboration with Pratt. Don D'Ammassa, however, dismissed these as "comparatively minor," and called Solomon's Stone "barely readable."
