= Men, Martians and Machines =

- First UK edition
- Author: Eric Frank Russell
- Language: English
- Genre: Science fiction
- Publisher: Dennis Dobson (UK)
- Publication date: 1955
- Publication place: United States
- Media type: Print (hardback)

Men, Martians and Machines is a collection of science fiction short stories by the British writer Eric Frank Russell. It was first published in 1955.

== Contents ==
The book follows the crew of a highly advanced spaceship, (relative to the time of publishing, radio is a highly advanced technology), as it explores the universe and has several encounters with various lifeforms on different planets that inevitably become hostile. These mini-adventures follow a prologue of sorts which gives background to the crew. The four stories are told from point of view of a nameless sergeant-at-arms.

- "Jay Score". How emergency pilot Jay Score saves the Upskadaska City, and its mixed crew of terrans and chess-loving Martians, after a meteor strike.
- "Mechanistria". The crew from Upskadaska City, along with some new characters, land on a planet in a solar system believed to contain life. The away team are captured by strange machines, but with Martian help they escape with few casualties. It was originally published in Astounding Science-Fiction, May 1941.
- "Symbiotica". The crew returns for another mission to a planet that is covered with plant life. They find the plants are hostile and strange little creatures live among them. They must quit interrogating one due to its obsessive fear of the dark. At night they come under attack and many are captured and led away on a sort of Bataan Death March to who knows where. Thankfully the Martians save them again as they have a running battle before they escape, the deadly plants and strange creatures, again with casualties. It first appeared in Astounding Science-Fiction, October 1943.
- "Mesmerica". The crew ask why they have returned for another mission. The planet they arrive on seems to be empty except for an enigmatic village. Strange happenings begin after the scout crew is sent out. In their suspicion they decide to send two parties out to explore more. Eventually they realize they are facing a race of mind benders, and manage to escape before the creatures become capable of stronger illusions. Men, Martians and Machines is the first publication of this story.

== Influence ==
The title of the book was used as the title of a song by German power metal band Gamma Ray on their 1997 album Somewhere Out in Space.

== Analysis ==
Russell's short story "Jay Score" (1941) is unusual amongst the pulp fiction of its time in presenting a black character, the ship's doctor, without any racial stereotyping. Indeed, this story and its sequels (collected in Men, Martians and Machines) may be considered an early example of the science fiction subgenre in which a spaceship is crewed by a multi-ethnic, mixed human/non-human, complement (cf. the much later Star Trek).

== See also ==
- Star Trek (also a multi-ethnic crew on a spaceship, exploring the galaxy.)
