= The Outlaws of Mars =

1961 novel by Otis Adelbert Kline

- Dust-jacket from the first edition
- Author: Otis Adelbert Kline
- Cover artist: Ed Emshwiller
- Language: English
- Series: Mars
- Genre: Science fiction novel
- Publisher: Avalon Books
- Publication date: 1961
- Publication place: United States
- Media type: Print (Hardback)
- Pages: 224 pp
- OCLC: 06960763
- Preceded by: The Swordsman of Mars

The Outlaws of Mars is a science fiction novel by Otis Adelbert Kline in the planetary romance subgenre pioneered by Edgar Rice Burroughs. It was originally serialized in seven parts in the magazine Argosy beginning in November 1933. It was first published in book form in 1961 in hardcover by Avalon Books in 1961; the first paperback edition was issued by Ace Books in the same year. Later trade paperback editions were published by Pulpville Press in November 2007 and Paizo Publishing in May 2009.

The novel is a semi-sequel to Kline's earlier Swordsman of Mars, as the setting is the same and the two books have some characters in common.

== Plot ==
Jerry Morgan, a man with no future on Earth, is offered a new life on Mars. He starts out on the wrong foot, meeting a princess and killing the fearsome-looking Martian beast he takes to be menacing her, which actually turns out to be her pet. From there Morgan becomes entangled in the politics of the Byzantine Martian royal court, spurns the advances of a would-be lover, escapes his hosts and role as an expendable political pawn. Various adventures follow, with dazzling swordplay, feats of strength, and other trials, tribulations and treacheries.

Kline's Mars has multiple parallel canals, surrounded by walls and terraces, and the construction of the canals by Martian machines is described. The story has a race-war element that may jar the modern reader.

== Reception ==
Floyd C. Gale of Galaxy Science Fiction in 1961 rated the "old-fashioned fairy tale" three stars out of five
