= Study in Still Life =

1959 short story by Eric Frank Russell

"Study in Still Life" is a satirical science fiction short story by British writer Eric Frank Russell. It depicts one man's struggle to outwit a choking bureaucracy, and come out ahead. It was first published in Astounding Science Fiction magazine in January 1959.

== Plot summary ==
Sitting at a desk with a surly co-worker, processing endless forms while fat cats in the office line their own nests, is no way to end a career as a space pilot. So when one ex-spacer finds that an order for a biological irradiator, needed to help wipe out an insect plague on a colony planet, has been sidelined to make way for a shipment of gin for one of his superiors, he takes action.

He invents a fictional new colony called "Nemo", and puts in a high priority order for the irradiator, meaning to re-route it to the real colony when it arrives. He forges several signatures, including his co-worker's and his own. He reasons that if anything at all gets done in the organization it's probably because people are forging signatures they'd have to wait forever to get. His deskmate just says "You can't beat the system."

The middle of the story tells the tale of how the new order progresses through the system, with officials inspecting the factory making the irradiator to see that it is indeed a real and properly patriotic business, and other officials creating official documents stating that the irradiator will indeed have the desired effect on the insects and so on and so forth.

In record time, that is to say mere years, the irradiator arrives, and immediately the bureaucrats smell a rat. The ex-pilot is called to explain to his boss, to the "I told you so's" of his deskmate. He seems oddly confident, however.

He explains to his boss that, yes, Nemo is not a colony. It's a code word for a "tentative priority", that is one which will apply if nothing else intervenes. When asked why he did this, he responds that certain shipments had been getting more priority than they deserve. Bit by bit he admits that the problem was the gin shipment, knowing that his boss is a mortal enemy of the gin drinker. That gets him off the hook, but then he plays his trump card.

He has an idea to stop abuses by creating a tracking process which will monitor a form as it proceeds through the system. His boss is only mildly interested until told of the extra subordinates he will have to hire to implement the process. Like most bureaucrats, his status, pay, perks, and pension increase with the number of people working for him. He decides to adopt the idea for the good of the organization, and gratefully offers the ex-pilot the job of supervisor in the new department.

Returning to his desk, our hero informs his surly deskmate that "You can beat any system. All you do is turn the handle the way it goes, only more so." The response is "Shut up. And don't talk until you can talk sense."
