= Mind your business =

Mind your business may refer to:

== Songs ==
- "Mind Your Business" (song), by will.i.am and Britney Spears, 2023
- "Mind Your Business", by Diddy from The Love Album: Off the Grid, 2023
- "Mind Your Business", by Organized Rhyme, 1992
- "Mind Your Business", by Sunny Boy from Elai Lineendunge, 2006

== Other uses ==
- "Mind your business", a motto imprinted on the Fugio cent of 1787 (the first general circulation coin of U.S. currency)
- Mind Your Business, a 1928 film directed by Benjamin Stoloff
- Mind Your Business, a 2024 American sitcom on BounceTV created by Alyssa Bonchick Moreinis, Danielle Dominique Nelson and Danielle Solomon.

== See also ==
- Mind your own business (disambiguation)
