= Jason, Son of Jason =

1966 novel by John Ulrich Giesy

- First book edition
- Author: John Ulrich Giesy
- Language: English
- Series: Jason Croft
- Genre: Science fiction
- Publisher: Avalon Books
- Publication date: 1966
- Publication place: United States
- Media type: Print (Hardback)
- Preceded by: The Mouthpiece of Zitu

Jason, Son of Jason is a science fiction novel by American writer John Ulrich Giesy. It was first published in book form in 1966 by Avalon Books. The novel was originally serialized in five parts in the magazine Argosy All-Story beginning in April 1921.

== Plot introduction ==
The third and final novel in the Jason Croft series once more brings Jason into contact with Dr. George Murray on Earth. This time, Jason brings Dr. Murray along via astral projection to Palos. Naia is suffering complications with her pregnancy, and Jason enlists the good doctor to help. After the birth, the child and mother are kidnapped by the Zollarians, and Croft once again uses his knowledge of earth technology to overcome the challenges he faces.
