= The Mouthpiece of Zitu =

1965 novel by John Ulrich Giesy

- First book edition (1965)
- Author: John Ulrich Giesy
- Cover artist: Gray Morrow
- Language: English
- Series: Jason Croft
- Genre: Science fiction
- Publisher: Avalon Books
- Publication date: 1965
- Publication place: United States
- Media type: Print (Hardback)
- Preceded by: Palos of the Dog Star Pack
- Followed by: Jason, Son of Jason

The Mouthpiece of Zitu is a science fiction novel by American writer John Ulrich Giesy. It was first published in book form in 1965 by Avalon Books. The novel was originally serialized in five parts in the magazine All-Story Weekly beginning in August 1919.

== Plot summary ==
The second novel in the Jason Croft series finds Jason once again relating his adventures on the world of Palos to Dr. George Murray via astral projection. Croft awakens to find that the high priest Zud has declared him the "Mouthpiece of Zitu", complicating matters with his engagement to Naia. Croft once again relies on using astral projection and his knowledge of earth technology to strengthen the nation of Tamarizia and once more win the heart of the princess.
