= Allamagoosa =

- Short story by Eric Frank Russell
- Illustrator: Frank Kelly Freas
- Country: United Kingdom
- Language: English
- Genre: Science fiction short story

Publication
- Published in: Astounding Science Fiction
- Publication type: Periodical
- Publisher: Street & Smith
- Media type: Print (Magazine)
- Publication date: May 1955
- Pages: 12
- Award: Hugo Award for Best Short Story (1955)

"Allamagoosa" is a Hugo-winning humorous science fiction short story by the English author Eric Frank Russell, originally published in the May 1955 issue of Astounding.

The story is a satire of the bureaucratic mindset - in this case in a military setting - and the second-order complications caused by a "creative" attempt to evade it. It has been collected in The Hugo Winners (1962), The Best Of Eric Frank Russell (1978), and Major Ingredients: The Selected Short Stories of Eric Frank Russell (2000), as well as a number of other anthologies.

== Plot summary ==
Frontispiece from the story's first publication, by Frank Kelly Freas

Shortly after landing at a spaceport in Vega, the military spaceship Bustler is informed of an impending surprise inspection. Captain McNaught recalls the crew from leave and begins a tedious line-by-line inventory of the ship's manifest. Communications officer Burman discovers that the list of equipment the Bustler was originally issued includes something called an "offog"; however, no one among the crew has any idea what an offog is, much less where to look for it. Misplacing equipment is a serious infraction, and asking headquarters to identify the item would be tacitly self-incriminating, but McNaught comes up with a solution: on the assumption that "offog" must simply be a playful nickname for some obscure, seldom-used gadget that has gone missing, he orders Burman to fabricate a small box, outfit it with blinkenlights, and regale the inspecting officer with some technobabble. The ruse works, and the ship passes inspection.

Five days later, the Bustler receives an unexpected order to return to Earth for a complete overhaul. Alarmed, Burman warns McNaught that shipyard engineers will immediately spot his impostor device, but the captain solves this second problem by discreetly disposing of the fake "offog", and blandly notifying headquarters that it had "come apart under gravitational stress" as the ship passed close to a star. Two days later, an emergency transmission recalls Earth's entire fleet to the nearest spaceports; an equally urgent query is directed specifically to the Bustler, demanding a detailed account of the "gravitational stress" incident. McNaught and Burman belatedly realize that "offog" had been a typo for "off.dog," or "official dog" (the ship's dog, a friendly mutt named Peaslake, having made several conspicuous appearances in the course of the story.) The story ends with the pair dejectedly awaiting their doom.

The story contains a good deal of humorous foreshadowing: Peaslake's collar, drinking bowl, and bed had immediately preceded and followed the "offog" on the inventory, and had been dully ticked off the list without McNaught or Burman noticing the implied connection between the objects; the Bustler's excitable French cook even blurts out "Nom d'un chien!" when pressed to identify the mystery item.

== Reception ==
"Allamagoosa" was the inaugural winner of the Hugo Award for Best Short Story in 1955.

John Joseph Adams has called it "uproariously funny".

James Nicoll has commented that it is "apparently based on an urban legend". In fact, it is essentially a science-fictional recasting of a traditional tall tale known as "The Shovewood".
