= J. Hunter Holly =

American novelist

Joan Carol Holly
- Born: September 25, 1932; Lansing, Michigan, USA
- Died: October 19, 1982 (age 50)
- Citizenship: United States
- Education: BA
- Alma mater: Michigan State University
- Occupation: Author
- Writing career
- Pen name: J. Hunter Holly
- Language: English
- Genre: Science fiction

Joan Carol Holly (1932–1982) was a science fiction author who wrote under the pseudonym J. Hunter Holly in the late 1950s until the mid-1970s.

== Early life ==
Holly was born and raised in Lansing, Michigan and from her various book dedications, had a strong love of cats. Holly graduated from Michigan State University during 1954 with a B.A. in psychology. Her affiliations at the University were Phi Kappa, Tau Sigma & Psi Chi. She was the recipient of the Hinman superior student scholarship.

== Career ==
Living most of her life in Lansing, beginning in 1959 Holly wrote science fiction novels and short stories, and adventure novels. Joan Holly also contributed stories for Roger Elwood's series of books and sci-fi magazines. She used the name J. Hunter Holly on her work through 1967. She contributed to The Man from U.N.C.L.E. series of original novels, writing #10 The Assassination Affair in 1967.

Between 1968 and 1971, Holly's career was sidelined by a benign brain tumor which was removed in 1970. When Holly returned to writing, she signed her material as Joan C. Holly for the next few years. She finally settled on the pen-name Joan Hunter Holly for her work from 1976 to her death. The last few years of Holly's life were plagued by further ill health, and she did not publish after 1979.

== Bibliography ==
=== Keeper series ===
- Keeper (Laser Books, 1976)
- Shepherd (Laser Books, 1977)

=== The Man from U.N.C.L.E. ===
- 10. The Assassination Affair (Ace Books, 1967)

=== Other novels ===
- Encounter (Avalon Books, 1959)
- The Green Planet (Avalon Books, 1961)
- The Flying Eyes (Monarch Books, 1962)
- The Dark Planet (Avalon Books, 1962)
- The Gray Aliens (Avalon Books, 1963, published in the UK as The Grey Aliens)
- The Running Man (Monarch Books, 1963)
- The Time Twisters (Avon Books, 1964)
- The Dark Enemy (Avalon Books, 1965)
- The Mind Traders (Avalon Books, 1967)
- Death Dolls of Lyra (Manor Books, 1977)

=== Short fiction ===
- "Silence" (Fantastic Stories of Imagination, June 1965)
- "The Question" (Famous Science Fiction, Winter 1966/1967)
- "The Gift of Nothing" (And Walk Now Gently Through the Fire and Other Science Fiction Stories, Dec. 1972)
- "The Others" (The Other Side of Tomorrow, 1973)
- "Child" (Demon Kind, Mar. 1973)
- "The Graduated Robot" (The Graduated Robot and Other Stories, 1974)
- "The Proper Study" (Long Night of Waiting and Other Stories, 1974)
- "Come See the Last Man Cry" (Tomorrow: New Worlds of Science Fiction, 1975)
- "Psi Clone" (Futurelove: A Science Fiction Triad, May 1977)
