= Collision Course (Silverberg novel) =

Novel by Robert Silverberg

- First edition cover
- Author: Robert Silverberg
- Cover artist: Ed Emshwiller
- Language: English
- Genre: Science fiction
- Publisher: Avalon Books
- Publication date: 1958
- Publication place: United States
- Media type: Print (hardback & paperback)
- Pages: 224
- OCLC: 220438007

Collision Course is a science fiction novel by American author Robert Silverberg, first published in hardcover in 1961 by Avalon Books and reprinted in paperback as an Ace Double later that year. Ace reissued it as a stand-alone volume in 1977 and 1982; a Tor paperback appeared in 1988. An Italian translation was also published in 1961, and a German translation later appeared. Silverberg planned the novel as a serial for Astounding Science Fiction, but John W. Campbell rejected the work and Silverberg eventually sold a shorter version to Amazing Stories, where it appeared in 1959.

Collision Course details the response of the political leadership of Earth to an eventual collision of their aggressive expanding colonial empire with a newly discovered alien race.

== Plot ==
The story is set in 2780, the later part of the 28th century, after well over four centuries of expansion into space limited by the speed of light, as ships with intrepid crews travel to new solar systems and install instantaneous transportation terminals known as transmats, which tie in with a system based on Earth. The current ruler, Mackenzie, who leads a small group of men chosen and trained as leaders, is dissatisfied with the light barrier and upon becoming the leader—the Technarch—he made a public address calling on science to find a way to exceed that barrier.

The first successful crewed FTL (faster-than-light) ship has reported in from its test flight, and upon landing, report their successful voyage through an alternate universe to distant locations in the galaxy, and of discovering the outer reaches of an alien civilization. The Technarch convenes a meeting of the ruling group, who receive a report from the starship crew, then deliberate the Technarch's intention to negotiate a division of the galaxy between them. Four men are selected to accompany the five starship crew back out, although the crew are exhausted and not enthusiastic about another long trip.

The four members of the diplomatic team selected for the trip—Bernard, a sociologist; Havig, a linguist; Stone, a politician; and Dominici, a biophysicist—find they are very different in temperament and outlook. Tempers flare between Bernard and Havig over previous academic and religious conflicts. They endure the long voyage that is unlike an instant transmat trip, and upon arrival, the humans meet the aliens.

Havig proceeds to teach the aliens English, then Stone explains the situation about the expanding empires. The aliens (a species named the Norglans), as supervisors of construction operations, say they cannot speak for their people and walk out, summoning more senior officials. The Norglan ambassadors seem agreeable there should be no war, but instead of establishing an agreed-upon division between the two cultures, they state simply that Earth will no longer be allowed to expand. They then walk out.

After attempts to renew negotiations prove fruitless (the ambassadors have already left for the Norglan homeworld via their own transmat network), the Terrans agree to return home with the bad news, which they believe will lead to war. However, the starship gets lost in the alternate space and returns to normal space in the Large Magellanic Cloud. Havig, a member of a religious denomination called the Neopuritans, breaks down in the belief he is being punished for some unknown sin, but Bernard manages to console him by reminding him of the trials of Job. The captain believes they should simply concede and find a place to live, even as the Milky Way tantalizes them in the sky of whatever planet they set down on. However, they are borne to a planet by a mysterious alien.

The Magellanic aliens—a race of incredibly physically advanced beings called the Rosgollans—summon the Norglan ambassadors who rejected Earth's overtures. The Rosgollans force both species to accept an equal division of the Milky Way, with no expansion beyond allowed for either.

The Rosgollans then return the Milky Way citizens to where they were: the Norglans are returned to their homeworld by the same mysterious means they were brought over. The Terran FTL ship is returned to its position near the Norglan colony where it was before its faulty attempt to return home. This time, the flight home proceeds correctly.

The expedition arrives home and Bernard goes to inform Technarch Mackenzie of the Rosgollans' enforced allocation of galactic space. The Technarch is left dismayed and desolate by the shattering of his dreams of infinite expansion, but Bernard consoles himself with the knowledge that one day Terran humans will be as advanced as the Rosgollans, and will be ready to take their rightful place among the stars.

== Reception ==
Rating it three stars out of five, Galaxy reviewer Floyd C. Gale described the novel as "entertaining and deft", if glibly plotted, noting that it "benefits from [Silverberg's] sure control of pace".
