= Invaders from Rigel =

1960 novel by Fletcher Pratt

- Dust jacket of 1st edition
- Author: Fletcher Pratt
- Cover artist: Ed Emshwiller
- Language: English
- Genre: Science fiction
- Publisher: Avalon Books
- Publication date: 1960
- Publication place: United States
- Media type: Print (hardcover)
- Pages: 224

Invaders from Rigel is a science fiction novel by American writer Fletcher Pratt. It was first published in hardcover by Avalon Books in 1960. The first paperback edition was issued by Airmont Books in January 1964 and reprinted in December 1972, May 1973, January 1976, and at least one later occasion. The novel has also been translated into Italian. The book is an expansion of the author's novella "The Onslaught from Rigel," originally published in the magazine Wonder Stories Quarterly in the issue for Winter 1932. Pratt reused the name of the protagonist, Benjamin Franklin Ruby, in the form B. F. Ruby as an authorial pseudonym for later stories.

== Plot ==
Ben Ruby and Murray Lee awaken one morning to discover themselves transformed into metal beings. In this, they are actually fortunate, most other inhabitants of the western hemisphere having become unliving statues. They and the few other survivors they meet at first assume the phenomenon to have been caused by a comet that had been approaching Earth, which is, in a way, true—but the comet was, in fact, a spacecraft of the Lassans, a race of elephantoid aliens from a planet of Rigel, who have utilized "life-force" (a sort of radiation) from the interior of the Earth to effect the change.

The militaristic Lassans believe it their destiny to destroy or enslave all "lesser" beings and accordingly plan to capture those who have survived their initial strike. Accordingly, Ruby and his companions are soon besieged by "dodos", strange bird-like creatures who are thought-controlled by the Lassans and carry light-bombs.

Ruby's group is relieved by a warship from Australia, whose inhabitants have been less affected by the Lassan radiation—in their case, it has merely turned the iron in their blood to cobalt, rendering them blue-skinned. In combination, the Australians and remaining Americans in turn besiege the stronghold of the invaders in New Jersey. But while their aircraft are effective against the dodo squadrons, the armored vehicles making up the Lassan ground forces, manned by giant apemen also under the Lassans' control, seem invulnerable.

The focus shifts to Herbert Sherman and Marta Lami, two metalized captives of the Lassans. Via "thought helmets" the invaders extract information from them about their fellow earthlings to further the war of conquest. However, the mental transfer works both ways, and through it Sherman learns as much about the aliens as they do about Earth, notably that they have much less knowledge of explosives. Escaping with this knowledge, he reveals it to the besieging forces, who use it to defeat and destroy the Lassans. Ultimately, the explosion of the "life force" generator results in the restoration of all the metalized humans to their normal forms.

== Reception ==
Everett F. Bleiler, commenting on the original novella in Science-Fiction: The Gernsback Years, called the story "almost parodic in main outline," noting that "[t]he first part is interesting, but the story soon degenerates into routine work," and scoring it for "[s]ome story inconsistencies."

Rating the book two stars out of five, Floyd C. Gale in Galaxy Science Fiction wrote in 1961 "[e]ven when I first read the magazine version as a lad back in '31, the story seemed utterly improbable. On rereading, I have to revise my estimate utterward". He felt "the Rigellians behave with unbelievable stupidity and the metal humans with their built-in stiff upper lips are too flip and glib," concluding that "Pratt's reputation rests secure on much better ground than this bog."

The book was also reviewed by P. Schuyler Miller in Analog Science Fact -> Fiction, December 1960.
