= Palos of the Dog Star Pack =

1965 novel by John Ulrich Giesy

- First book edition
- Author: John Ulrich Giesy
- Cover artist: Gray Morrow
- Language: English
- Series: Jason Croft
- Genre: Science fiction
- Publisher: Avalon Books
- Publication date: 1965
- Publication place: United States
- Pages: 192
- OCLC: 37323704
- Followed by: The Mouthpiece of Zitu

Palos of the Dog Star Pack is a science fiction novel by American writer John Ulrich Giesy. It was first published in book form in 1965 by Avalon Books. The novel was originally serialized in five parts in the magazine All-Story Weekly beginning in July 1918.

== Plot summary ==
Set on the planet Palos, the novel concerns Jason Croft, a wealthy American who has learned the art of astral projection from a Hindu teacher. Croft feels an unusual calling to Sirius, the Dog Star, and projects his consciousness there, eventually finding his way to the major planet of the planetary system, Palos. Once there, Croft finds human life, and floats among them observing their lives. He falls in love at first sight with the princess Naia, and determines to win her love. He eventually finds a host body in the form of the "spiritually sick" Jasor of Nodhur. Within Jasor's body, Croft sets out to win the love of the princess, by introducing technological improvements to the rulers of her kingdom, Tamarizia. Because of the knowledge gained by astrally spying upon key figures and places on Palos, the people view him as an "angel" of sorts, sent by their deity Zitu. Croft uses this misunderstanding to explain his knowledge of advanced technology.
