= The Great Explosion =

1962 novel by Eric Frank Russell

- First edition
- Author: Eric Frank Russell
- Language: English
- Series: A Torquil Book
- Genre: Science fiction
- Publisher: Dodd, Mead and Company
- Publication date: 1962
- Publication place: United States
- Media type: Print (Hardback, 1962, Paperback, Avon 1975)
- Pages: 187 (first edition), 160 (first paperback printing)
- OCLC: 5846254

The Great Explosion is a satirical science fiction novel by English writer Eric Frank Russell, first published in 1962. The story is divided into three sections. The final section is based on Russell's 1951 short story "...And Then There Were None". Twenty-three years after the novel was published, it won a Prometheus Hall of Fame Award.

== Plot ==
The Blieder drive, a faster-than-light drive system, has permitted the population of Earth to colonize the galaxy. Each planet has become home for a particular social group. Four hundred years after the diaspora (the "Great Explosion" of the title), a spaceship from Earth visits three of the planets, the first steps to unifying the galaxy under a new Empire. The ship contains two thousand Terrans including many pompous officials, an army of bureaucrats, a military force and the ship's crew, including some misfits. Things do not go entirely as hoped, as the incompetent military authoritarians of the ship encounter three very different societies.

The first planet was a penal colony; it is now many independent kleptocratic despotisms preying on each other. The second planet, Hygeia, is populated by health and fitness fanatic nudists. The third planet, Kassim, was colonized by a religious group, but when the ship arrives, the Terrans cannot find any human life, only empty villages overgrown by jungle. They decide not to land on the planet, because the captain fears that the colonists could have been killed by a disease and he doesn't want to endanger the crew. The final planet, K22g, has developed an unusual social system. The population call themselves Gands (after Gandhi) and practise a form of classless, philosophically anarchic libertarianism, based on passive resistance ("Freedom - I won't!" and "Myob!"); and a moneyless gift economy based on barter and favor-exchange, using "obs" (obligations). To perform a service for somebody "lays an ob" on them; they can then "kill the ob" by returning the favor. As the planet's population are demonstrably non-hostile, the officials have to approve shore leave, which brings the crew into contact with the anarchist natives. Many find reasons to stay on the planet, refusing to return to the ship. The officials have to get the ship back into space before they lose so many that the ship will never fly again.

== See also ==
- The Waitabits - a similar story by Russell involving Earth bureaucrats encountering unusual aliens.
- Local Exchange Trading Systems (LETS)
