= The Blue Barbarians =

1931 novel by Stanton A. Coblentz

- First book edition
- Author: Stanton A. Coblentz
- Cover artist: Ric Binkley
- Language: English
- Genre: Science fiction
- Published: 1931 (Amazing Stories); 1958 (Avalon Books)
- Publication place: United States of America
- Media type: Print (Hardback)
- Pages: 223 (Hardback edition)
- OCLC: 5658418

The Blue Barbarians is a science fiction novel by American author Stanton A. Coblentz. It was first published in Amazing Stories magazine in 1931 and first published in book form in 1958 by Avalon Books. The novel is a satire on the American economic and political system as they existed in 1931.

== Plot ==
In the Eight Hundredth Millennium the Sun is fading and Earth is freezing over. Humanity needs a new home if it is to survive and Venus has been chosen for exploration. Seven expeditions have gone to Venus and vanished: now the eighth is leaving. Physicist Erom Reve discovers, to his dismay, that his traveling companion will be Daolgi Kar, a self-styled poet who brings his little dog Tippy.

Reaching Venus, the men must bail out of their spacecar before meteors destroy it. They descend under electric parachutes and then make their way across the alien landscape until they come to a city, where they are captured and put into a zoo. Over several weeks they learn the rudiments of the Venusian language. After convincing the Venusians that they are not animals, the two men (with Tippy) are sent to prison for entering the nation of Wultho illegally. There they refine their knowledge of the local language and customs. After a year Erom and Daolgi are sent to work in a sawdust factory.

Daolgi's inattention to his job leads to a fire that burns down the sawdust factory. In the confusion the two men and Tippy escape from the city and take refuge in the countryside. They end up living in a cave by the sea and Erom struggles to make green glass, the highest denomination of Venusian currency. When he succeeds in making two large chunks of it, he and Daolgi go to a village. They are given a hostile reception as vagabonds until Erom displays some green glass, then the villagers welcome him and Daolgi as Large Letter Men.

When the Earthmen hear rumors of white-skinned giants terrorizing a distant continent, Erom arranges an expedition by airship to investigate his suspicion that the monsters are actually members of the previous expeditions from Earth. They arrive at a Wulthonian outpost and plunge into the jungle, where they find a small hamlet occupied by humans. Using a crude wireless telegraph, the explorers have gathered in all of the expeditions as they crash-landed on Venus and now they live in peace with their neighbors. Having already established himself as the owner of a town in Wultho, Erom convinces the others to come back with him and possibly find a way to contact Earth.

With the help of two of the others, Erom returns to the seaside cave and makes a large quantity of green glass. He uses the new wealth to become the richest and most powerful man on Venus. Working in secret, Erom has a set of new spacecars built for him and his friends and he builds a radio capable of communicating with Earth. A foreign dignitary comes to his town and one of his companions inadvertently insults him, thereby triggering a planetwide war. Their greed for colored glass exceeded only by their eagerness to slaughter each other, the Venusians use a newly invented death ray in their orgy of self-annihilation. The humans, in their spacecars, head back to Earth to prepare for Humanity's move to soon-to-be-depopulated Venus.

== Publication history ==
- 1931, USA, Radio-Science Publications, Inc. (Amazing Stories Quarterly; Summer 1931), Pub date Jul 1931, Bedsheet Magazine (144 pp)
- 1958, USA, Avalon Books, Hardback (223 pp)

== Sources ==
- Clute, John, and David Langford. "Coblentz, Stanton A." in The Encyclopedia of Science Fiction. Eds. John Clute, David Langford, Peter Nicholls and Graham Sleight. Gollancz, 25 Aug. 2015. Web. 27 Aug. 2016. <http://www.sf-encyclopedia.com/entry/coblentz_stanton_a>.
- Tuck, Donald H. (1974).The Encyclopedia of Science Fiction and Fantasy. Chicago: Advent. pg. 106. ISBN 0-911682-20-1.

== Listings ==
The book is listed at

- The Library of Congress as http://lccn.loc.gov/58009128
- www.worldcat.org as 5658418
