= John Ulrich Giesy =

American physician, novelist and author (1877–1947)

John U. Giesy
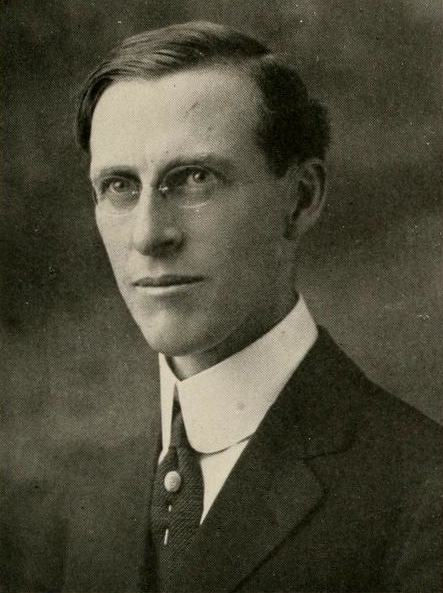
- Born: August 6, 1877; Chillicothe, Ohio, United States
- Died: September 8, 1947 (aged 70); Salt Lake City, Utah, US
- Occupations: Physician, writer
- Writing career
- Period: 1912–1924
- Genre: Speculative fiction

John Ulrich Giesy (August 6, 1877 – September 8, 1947) was an American physician, novelist and author. He was one of the early writers in the Sword and Planet genre, with his Jason Croft series. He collaborated with Junius B. Smith on many of his stories.

== Career ==
Giesy was born near Chillicothe, Ross County, Ohio, USA.

Robert Weinberg's website described the series of stories starring Jason Croft as "[o]ne of the most popular scientific romance trilogies published in All-Story Weekly magazine of the first quarter of the 20th century." Giesy also wrote for other pulp magazines such as Argosy, Adventure and Weird Tales. Giesy's 1915 novel All For His Country is a story of a future invasion of the US by the Japanese. Because All For His Country depicts Japanese-Americans living in California helping the invasion, some critics have cited it as an example of the anti-Japanese racism that ultimately resulted in the Internment of Japanese Americans after Pearl Harbor. Giesy lived in Salt Lake City where he met Junius B. Smith, with whom he co-authored a large number of stories, including those featuring the occult detective Semi-Dual.

== Bibliography ==
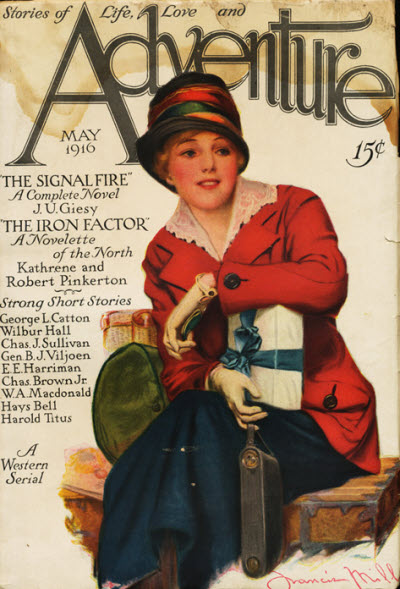
Giesy's "The Signal Fire" was cover-featured on the May 1916 issue of Adventure

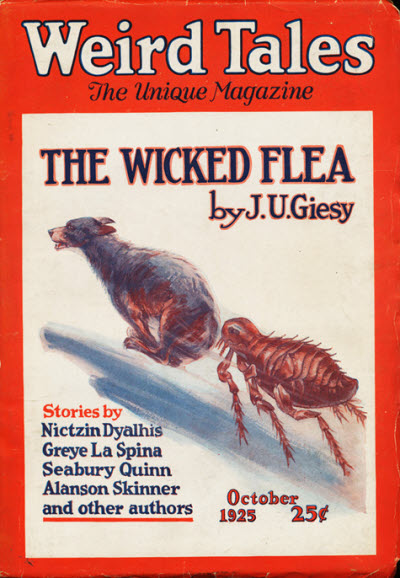
Giesy's "The Wicked Flea" was published in Weird Tales, October 1925

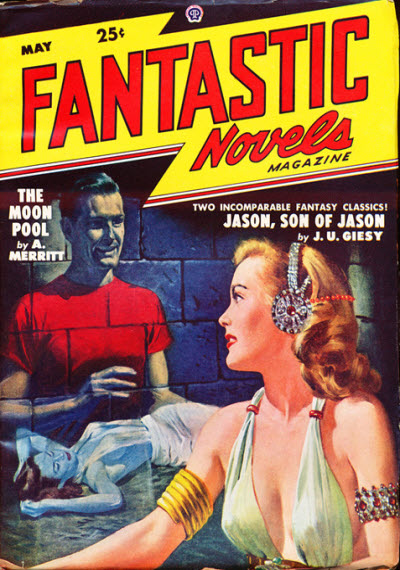
Jason, Son of Jason was reprinted in Fantastic Novels in 1948

=== The Jason Croft series ===
- Palos of the Dog Star Pack (All-Story Magazine, July–August 1918)
- The Mouthpiece of Zitu (All-Story Weekly, July–August 1919)
- Jason, Son of Jason (Argosy All-Story, April–May 1921)

=== Semi-Dual ===
(all written with Junius B. Smith) The Semi-Dual series includes:

- "The Occult Detector" (The Cavalier, February–March 1912)
- "House of Invisible Bondage" (All-Story Weekly, 1926)
- "Black and White" (1920)
- "The Black Butterfly" (1918)
- "Box 991" (1916)
- "The Curse of Quetzal" (1914)
- "The Compass in the Sky" (People's Magazine May 1917)
- "The Ghost of a Name" (The Cavalier December 20, 1913)
- "The Green Goddess" (Argosy Jan 31, Feb 7, Feb 14, February 21, 1931)
- "The House of the Ego" The Cavalier Sep 20, Sep 27, October 4, 1913
- "House of the Hundred Lights" All-Story Weekly May 22, May 29, 1920
- "The Ivory Pipe" All-Story Weekly Sep 20, Sep 27, October 4, 1919
- "The Killer" All-Story Weekly Apr 7, April 14, 1917
- "The Ledger of Life" (1934)
- "The Master Mind" The Cavalier January 25, 1913
- "The Opposing Venus" (1923)
- "Poor Little Pigeon" (1924)
- "The Purple Light" The Cavalier Oct 5, Oct 12, October 19, 1912
- "Rubies of Doom" The Cavalier Jul 5, July 12, 1913
- "The Significance of the High "D”" The Cavalier Mar 9, Mar 16, March 23, 1912
- "Snared" All-Story Weekly Dec 18, December 25, 1915
- "Solomon's Decision" (1917)
- "The Stars Were Looking" Top-Notch July 1, 1918
- "Stars of Evil" (1919)
- "The Storehouse of Past Events" People's Favorite Magazine February 10, 1918
- "The Unknown Quantity" All-Story Weekly Aug 25, Sep 1, September 8, 1917
- "The Web of Circumstance" All Around Magazine Nov 1916
- "The Web of Destiny" (1915)
- "The Wistaria Scarf" The Cavalier Jun 1, Jun 8, June 15, 1912
- "The Wolf of Erlik" (1921)
- "The Woolly Dog" Argosy All-Story Weekly March 23, 1929

=== Professor Zapt ===
- "Indegestible Dog Biscuits" (1915)
- "Blind Man's Buff" (1920)
- "Zapt's Repulsive Paste" (1919)
- "The Wicked Flea" (1925)

=== Other novels and stories ===
- All for His Country (1915)

== See also ==
- Physician writer
