= Ellen Gray Massey =

- Born: November 14, 1921; Nevada, Missouri, U.S.
- Died: July 13, 2014 (aged 92); Lebanon, Missouri, U.S.
- Notable awards: Western Writers Spur Award; 2014 Papa's Gold

Website
- ellengraymassey.webs.com

Ellen Gray Massey (November 14, 1921 – July 13, 2014) was an American writer and schoolteacher.

Massey was raised near Nevada, Missouri, and spent some time in Washington, D.C. She received a bachelor's degree in English at the University of Maryland before moving back to Missouri, settling in the Lebanon area. She oversaw a class of high school sophomores, juniors, and seniors who produced Bittersweet, the Ozark Quarterly magazine.

Massey also gave hundreds of talks about the Ozarks.

== Works ==
Massey wrote many books, including the following titles:

- Papa's Gold (2013)
- Footprints in the Ozarks: A Memoir (2011)
- Morning in Nicodemus (2009)
- Her Enemies Blue and Gray (2008)
- New Hope (2004)
- Family Fun and Games: A Hundred Year Tradition (2001)
- The Burnt District (2001)
- Borderland-Homecoming (2000)
- Music of My Soul (1998)
- And Tyler, Too? (1998)
- Home is the Heart (1998)
- A Candle Within Her Soul (1995)

== Awards ==
Massey's writing won a number of awards, including the 2014 Western Writers Spur Award in the juvenile fiction category with Papa's Gold.
