= Next of Kin (novel) =

1959 novel by Eric Frank Russell

First edition (publ. Dennis Dobson, 1959)

Next of Kin, also known as The Space Willies, is a science fiction comic novel by English writer Eric Frank Russell. It is the story of a military misfit who successfully conducts a one-man psychological warfare operation against an alien race, with whom humans and allied races are at war. It was published under the title Next of Kin in 1959. A novella-length version was published in Astounding Science Fiction in 1956 as "Plus X", then published in somewhat expanded form by ACE Books as The Space Willies in 1958.

== Plot ==
John Leeming is every sergeant's worst nightmare — immune to discipline and punishment, and given to random acts of defiance, such as wearing his cap backwards on parade for no particular reason. Thus when a mission to fly a prototype spaceship behind enemy lines comes up, he is the ideal candidate to fly it.

The ship is untested, but should be able to outrun anything else in the galaxy. It has no weapons, but is an ideal long-range spy vessel for discovering more about the enemy Lathians and their allies. Since the odds of returning alive are pretty slim, it is also an ideal way of dealing with Leeming. For his part, Leeming is ready to jump at any alternative to life in barracks and the stockade.

For a while the mission goes well, but eventually some of the ship's "propulsors" fail after long use, and Leeming is forced to land on a world far inside enemy territory, which turns out to be inhabited by a dour, reptilian race who make ideal prison guards.

Leeming winds up in one half of a POW camp, of which the other half is inhabited by members of an allied race. Unfortunately, they have never seen a human and so do not trust him. He begins to cultivate an imaginary friend whom he calls Eustace. He convinces the guards that Eustace can go anywhere and spy for him, and also that every human has a Eustace who can do the same. In addition, a Eustace will wreak revenge on anyone who harms their partner. As luck would have it, one guard he threatens with Eustace is shot for allowing a mass escape attempt of the other prisoners.

Furthermore, Leeming alleges that the Lathians, the leaders of the enemy alliance, have invisible companions called Willies, although these are far inferior to Eustaces. He tells the aliens to ask human prisoners on other planets two questions: "Do the Lathians have the Willies?" ("willies" being slang for a feeling of anxiety) and "Are the Lathians nuts?", a "nut", according to Leeming, being someone with an invisible companion. Leeming's captors are convinced by the responses and fear that if they accept more human prisoners, they will have thousands of invisible Eustaces running wild across their planet and causing mayhem. They release Leeming and smuggle him home, at the same time withdrawing from the Lathian alliance and convincing other races to do the same. The enemy alliance collapses, and the Lathians have to make peace.

On arriving home, Leeming's behaviour is, if anything, even more erratic and insubordinate than ever. It is not clear if this is due to his sense of elation at having beaten his captors, or to his having suffered a nervous breakdown from the stresses he has endured.

The plot has obvious similarities to E. H. Jones's The Road to En-Dor – an account of that author's escape from the Yozgad prisoner of war camp in Turkey during World War I.
