= George H. Smith (fiction author) =

American writer

George Henry Smith (October 27, 1922 – May 22, 1996) was an American science fiction author who also wrote soft-core erotica. He is not the same person as George H. Smith, a libertarian writer, or George O. Smith, another science fiction writer. There were at least three authors writing as "George H. Smith" in the 1960s; one wrote many "swamp love" paperback originals, which are often erroneously attributed to George Henry Smith. Smith himself used the pseudonyms Jeremy August, Jerry August, Don Bellmore, Ross Camra, M J Deer (with his wife, Jane Deer Smith), John Dexter (a "house name" used by multiple authors); George Devlin, Robert Hadley, Jan Hudson (a "house name"), Jerry Jason, Clancy O'Brien, Alan Robinson, Holt Standish, Diana Summers, Hal Stryker, Hank Stryker, Morgan Trehune, Roy Warren, and J X Williams (a "house name") for publishers such as Avalon, Beacon, Boudoir, Brandon House, Epic, Evening Reader, France, Greenleaf, Midwood, Monarch, Notetime, Pike, Pillow, and Playtime. It is known that he wrote more than 100 novels.

== Works ==
- Dylan MacBride series
  - Kar Kaballa (1969)
  - The Second War of the Worlds (1976)
  - The Island Snatchers (1978)
- Whip of Passion (1959; Newsstand Library)
- Brutal Ecstacy (1960; Novel Book)
- Baroness of Blood (1961)(a "St. Germain" novel; later issued as Beautiful but Brutal)
- Passion's Web (1961; as by Jan Hudson; Epic Books 102 Art Enterprises)
- 1976, The Year of Terror (1961) (later as The Year for Love)
- Scourge of the Blood Cult (1961)
- Satan's Daughter (1961; as by Jan Hudson; Epic 113) reprinted as by Anonymous, Moonlight Reader MR113
- The Coming of the Rats (1961) (later issued as Virgin Mistress)
- Love Cult (1961; as by Jan Hudson; a "Jake Reynolds" novel; Pike 205)
- Soft Lips on Black Velvet (1961; a "St. Germain" novel)
- Love Goddess (1961; as by Jan Hudson; a "Jake Reynolds" novel; Pike Books 217)
- Fever Hot Woman (1962)
- Girls Afire (1962; as by Jan Hudson)
- Sorority Sluts (1962; as by Jan Hudson; Epic 125 Art Enterprises)
- Assault (1962; as by Ross Camra)(later issued as Space Sex as by Roy Warren (Heart, 1965); and Sex Machine as by Anonymous)
- Strange Harem (1962; as by Jan Hudson; France Book F24)
- Hell's Highway (1962; as by Jan Hudson; Pillow 103)
- Private Hell (1962; Pike Books 210)
- Shocking She-Animal (1962; Novel Book)
- A Place named Hell (1963; as by M J Deer)
- Flames of Desire (1963; as by M J Deer)("M D Deer" is a misprint on the title page)
- Gang Girls (1963; as by Jan Hudson; Boudoir 1024)
- The Hottest Party in Town (1963; as by Jan Hudson; Intimate Edition 721)
- The Virtuous Harlots (1963; as by Jan Hudson; Neva Paperbacks 644)
- Country Club Lesbian (1963; as by Jerry Jason; Brandon House)
- Sexodus! (1963; as by Jerry Jason)
- Doomsday Wing (1963)
- Bedroom Payoff (1964; as by Jerry August)
- The Psycho Makers (1964; as by Jerry Jason; Nite Time Original / Tempo)
- Strip Artist (1964; Playtime Books)
- The Unending Night (1964; a novel begun by Marion Zimmer Bradley)
- The Forgotten Planet (1965; as by George Henry Smith)
- The Lovemakers (1965; as by Jan Hudson; Beacon Books B894X)(later as Sweet Invitation, 1974, Softcover Library London)
- Lesbian Triangle (1965; as by Jerry Jason)
- Two Times for Love (1965; as by Robert Hadley)
- Wildcat (1965; as by Alan Robinson)
- Orgy Buyer (1965; as by John Dexter)
- Four Bed Wildcat (1966; as by Jeremy August)
- The Four Day Weekend (1966; as by George Henry Smith)
- Druid's World (1967; as by George Henry Smith)
- Those Sexy Saucer People (1967; as Jan Hudson; Greenleaf Classic GC220)
- The Virgin Agent (1967; as Jerry Jason; a "St. Germain" novel)
- Novice Sex Queen (1968; as Jeremy August; Brandon 2062)
- Witch Queen of Lochlann (1969) (published under both names)
- The Multi-Sex Crowd (1969; as Jan Hudson with 'Clancy o'Brien'; Pendulum 247)
- An Intimate Life (1969; as Robert Hadley; Midwood 38-335 // with Coed in Distress by Margaret Penn)
- Pucker Power (1970; as Robert Hadley; Midwood 60524)
- Girl in Heat (1972; as George Devlin; Midwood 60203)
- Bedtime Betsy (1976; as Robert Hadley; Bee Line LL0204)
- Swappers Unlimited (1974; as George Devlin; Midwood 60348)
- The Hungry Years (1974; as George Devlin; Midwood 60387)
- Bikini Girl (1978; as George Devlin; Midwood 61112) 2nd printing aka Girl in the Red Bikini
- Blonde Vixen (1978; as George Devlin; Midwood 61135) rp as 61765, 1981
- Wild is the Heart (as Diana Summers; 1978; Playboy Press)
- Love's Wicked Ways (as Diana Summers; 1984; Playboy Press)
- Louisiana (as Diana Summers; 1984)
- NYPD 2025 (1985; as Hal Stryker; Pinnacle)
- Loveswept #293: Water Witch (1988; as Jan Hudson)

== Annwn series ==
Kar Kaballa, The Second War of the Worlds, and The Island Snatchers are a series featuring a protagonist named Dylan MacBride, and set in the land of Avalon on Anwwn (a parallel to Earth). The first was published by Ace Books, and the others by DAW Books.

According to a legend, Avalon is the place where King Arthur was taken when he was dying. In Avalon, Earth is a place of legend, separated from Avalon by a dimensional gateway, and what is legend in one place is real in another.

In Kar Kaballa, Dylan MacBride, the son of a famous Avalonian explorer, attempts to warn the Empire in which he lives (fairly similar to the late-19th century British Empire) of an impending invasion by the Gogs. The Gogs are a nomadic race equivalent to the Mongols, living on a continent separated from Avalon by a narrow sea. Their ruler is Kar Kaballa, and they worship a deity named Cythraul who demands human sacrifice and wishes to emerge and consume the world.

MacBride's attempts are unsuccessful because the Empire assumes the Gogs cannot cross the sea barrier that separates the continents and, in any case, the Navy would stop them. MacBride's explanations that the sea barrier that separates the continents freezes over once every fifty years and that the freeze is due to happen again, giving the Gogs ready access to Avalon and making the Navy powerless to stop them, are ignored. Thus, the 19th-century-equivalent culture must contend anachronistically with an invasion of a barbarian horde similar to that of Attila the Hun or Genghis Khan (but armed with formidable, advanced weaponry). The nomads being named "Gogs" obviously links their invasion with the apocalyptic visions of Gog and Magog, derived from Jewish Eschatology and taken up by other religions as well.

MacBride must team with a naval officer, a visitor from Earth who is trying to sell a new weapon called a Gatling gun to the Imperial authorities, and Clarinda McTague, an appealing sorceress who worships the goddess Keridwen, in an attempt to stop the Gogs and prevent Cythraul from emerging from his underground lair and consuming the world.

It's a serio-comic story, combining the "Yellow Peril" threat popular in old novels, a Great Old One as per H. P. Lovecraft, and elements of Celtic mythology.

The Second War of the Worlds is a sequel to Kar Kaballa in which Wells' Martian invaders (from The War of the Worlds) have taken a step sideways to Thor (the Anwwn-equivalent of Mars) to attempt the invasion of Anwwn. There are primitive submarines, dirigibles, and Old Souls involved, and the Martians are once again defeated. Two men from Earth, Mr. H and Dr. W, assist MacBride defeat the Martians; the story makes it clear that these characters are obviously Sherlock Holmes and Dr. John Watson.

The Island Snatchers is the third Dylan McBride book, and features Gaelic gods stealing the island from which Clarinda (now Mrs. McBride) hails, and the McBrides' efforts to get the island back.

Druid's World from 1967 is a variant of Kar Kaballa, written two years later, featuring a protagonist named Adam MacBride, but again set in an "Avalon" which combined features of 19th century England (although the naval mutinies are similar to those of the Napoleonic Wars, the Spithead Mutiny in particular) with features of the 5th or 6th century Byzantine Empire.

== Other works ==
Quite different is Smith's nuclear war novel Doomsday Wing. It shares many plot elements with the more famous film Dr. Strangelove or: How I Learned to Stop Worrying and Love the Bomb, but with reversed allegiances — where the film depicted a fanatic anti-Communist American general initiating an attack on the Soviet Union on his own initiative, in the Smith novel there is a fanatic Russian Communist attacking America without any authorization.

Smith's soft-core erotic novel, The Coming of the Rats (vt, Virgin Mistress) begins just before atomic bombs hit the United States and becomes a survivalist novel where the hero and his mates fight mutated rats.

The soft-core erotic "St. Germain" and "Jake Reynolds" series (along with others of his oeuvre) use witchcraft and black magic elements for putative fantasy, but remain mainstream works.
