= Joseph E. Kelleam =

American writer

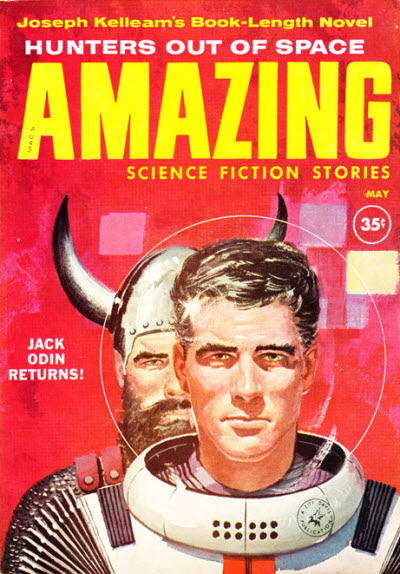
Kelleam's novel Hunters Out of Space was serialized in Amazing Stories in 1960

Joseph Everidge Kelleam (1913–1975), born in Boswell, Oklahoma, was an American writer. His first story, "Rust", appeared in Astounding Science Fiction in 1939.

His novels include:

- Overlords From Space (1956) Ace Books, bound dos-à-dos with Ray Cummings' The Man Who Mastered Time
- The Little Men (1960) Avalon (Hardback)
- Hunters of Space (1960) Avalon (Hardback) (serialized as Hunters Out of Space in Amazing Stories)
- When the Red King Woke (1966) Avalon (Hardback)
