= Mind your own business =

English saying often abbreviated as MYOB

"Mind your own business" is a common English saying which asks for a respect of other people's privacy. It strongly suggests that a person should stop interfering in what does not affect themselves. Contextually, it is often used in an argument or dispute as a remark to refute, reject or discourage other peoples' concerns or comments. Its acronym is MYOB.

== Origin ==
The Greek phrase πράσσειν τὰ ἴδια, appearing in St. Paul's first letter to the Thessalonians, is usually translated as "mind your own business".

The first coin that was minted and officially circulated by the United States, the Fugio Cent, displays the words "Mind Your Business" on the obverse.

== 20th century ==
In the 1930s, a slang version rendered the saying as "Mind your own beeswax". It is meant to soften the force of the retort. Folk etymology has it that this idiom was used in the colonial period when women would sit by the fireplace making wax candles together, though there are many other theories.

In the classic science fiction story "...And Then There Were None", author Eric Frank Russell shortened "Mind your own business" to "MYOB" or "Myob!", which was used as a form of civil disobedience on the planet of the libertarian Gands. Russell's short story was subsequently incorporated into his 1962 novel The Great Explosion.

== See also ==
- A wigwam for a goose's bridle
- Bodily integrity
- Personal boundaries
