= San Diego State University Global Campus =

Online college based in California, US

Coordinates: 32°46′21″N 117°4′25″W

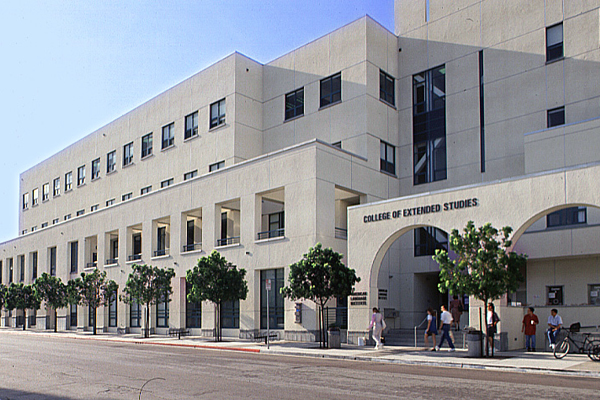
- Type: Public
- Established: 1974
- Parent institution: San Diego State University
- Location: 5250 Campanile Drive, San Diego, California, 92182-1920, United States
- Campus: Virtual
- Website: globalcampus.sdsu.edu

San Diego State University Global Campus is the continuing education college of San Diego State University, a public research university in San Diego, California. It was the previously called the SDSU College of Extended Studies. It provides instruction for continuing education programs including professional development and continuing professional development.
