= Evelyn E. Smith =

American novelist

- Born: 25 July 1922; New York, USA
- Died: 4 July 2000 (aged 77); New York, USA
- Occupations: Writer; Crossword-puzzle compiler
- Writing career
- Genres: Science fiction Gothic romance Mystery
- Notable works: The Perfect Planet; Unpopular Planet; The Copy Shop; The Laminated Woman; Tea Tray in the Sky; Miss Melville Regrets

Evelyn E. Smith (25 July 1922 – 4 July 2000) was an American writer of science fiction and mysteries, as well as a compiler of crossword puzzles.

== Profile ==
During the 1950s, under her own name, Smith regularly published short stories and novelettes in such publications as Galaxy Science Fiction, Fantastic Universe and The Magazine of Fantasy & Science Fiction. Her short fiction ranges from satires set in a post-apocalyptic setting such as "The Last of the Spode" and "The Hardest Bargain", to "BAXBR/DAXBR", where she explores the dangers of Martian crossword puzzles. Her science fiction novels chiefly deal with questions of gender identity and, like all of her work, are characterized by their wit and humor.

Smith is probably best known, however, for her Miss Melville Mystery series, which chronicles the exploits of a middle-aged socialite-turned-assassin.

Under the pseudonym of Delphine C. Lyons, she authored a number of gothic romance novels and the non-fiction works Everyday Witchcraft and Love Potions & Spells, which collect folklore and magical spells, and Fortune Telling, eight ways to read the future.

Smith's short story "At Last I've Found You" was adapted into an opera by Seymour Barab; it premiered in Charlotte, North Carolina in 1984.

== Works ==
=== Novels ===
- The Perfect Planet (1962)
- Unpopular Planet (1975)
- The Copy Shop (1985)

=== Short stories ===
- "Tea Tray in the Sky" (1952)
- "The Martian and the Magician" (1952)
- "Not Fit for Children" (1953)
- "The Last of the Spode" (1953) [also as by Evelyn Smith ]
- "Nightmare on the Nose" (1953)
- "BAXBR/DAXBR" (1954)
- "Call Me Wizard" (1954)
- "Gerda" (1954)
- "The Agony of the Leaves" (1954)
- "At Last I've Found You" (1954)
- "Collector's Item" (1954)
- "The Laminated Woman" (1954)
- "The Vilbar Party" (1955)
- "Dragon Lady" (1955)
- "Helpfully Yours" (1955)
- "The Big Jump" (1955)
- "Man's Best Friend" (1955)
- "The Princess and the Physicist" (1955)
- "The Faithful Friend" (1955)
- "Teragram" (1955)
- "The Good Husband" (1955)
- "The Doorway" (1955)
- "Jack of No Trades" (1955)
- "Weather Prediction" (1955)
- "Floyd and the Eumenides" (1955)
- "Bodyguard" (1956)
- "The Captain's Mate" (1956)
- "The Venus Trap" (1956)
- "Mr. Replogle's Dream" (1956)
- "Woman's Touch" (1957)
- "The Ignoble Savages" (1957)
- "The Lady from Aldebaran" (1957)
- "Once a Greech" (1957)
- "Outcast of Mars" (1957)
- "The 4D Bargain" (1957)
- "The Hardest Bargain" (1957)
- "The Man Outside" (1957)
- "The Most Sentimental Man" (1957)
- "The Weegil" (1957)
- "The Blue Tower" (1958)
- "My Fair Planet" (1958)
- "Never Come Midnight" (1958)
- "Two Suns of Morcali" (1958) (variant title: "The Two Suns of Morcali")
- "The People Upstairs" (1959)
- "The Alternate Host" (1959)
- "Someone To Watch Over Me" (1959)
- "Send Her Victorious" (1960)
- "A Day in the Suburbs" (1960)
- "Sentry of the Sky" (1961)
- "Softly While You're Sleeping" (1961)
- "Robert E. Lee at Moscow" (1961)
- "They Also Serve" (1962)
- "Little Gregory" (1964)
- "Calliope and Gherkin and the Yankee Doodle Thing" (1969)

=== Miss Melville mysteries ===
- Miss Melville Regrets (1986)
- Miss Melville Returns (1988)
- Miss Melville's Revenge (1990)
- Miss Melville Rides a Tiger (1991)
- Miss Melville Rejoices (1991)
- Miss Melville Runs For Cover (1997)

=== Other novels (as Delphine C. Lyons) ===
- Flowers of Evil (1965)
- House of Four Windows (1965)
- The Depths of Yesterday (1966)
- Valley of Shadows (1968)
- Phantom at Lost Lake (1970)

=== Nonfiction (as Delphine C. Lyons) ===
- Everyday Witchcraft (1972)
- Love Potions & Spells (1980)
- Fortune Telling (1980)

=== Short story collections ===
- Evelyn E. Smith Resurrected: Selected Stories of Evelyn E. Smith (2010)
- The Two Suns of Morcali and Other Stories (2012)
- An Evelyn E. Smith Omnibus (2020)
