= The Glass Cage (novel) =

1971 novel by Georges Simenon

- Author: Georges Simenon
- Original title: La Cage de verre
- Translator: Antonia White
- Publication date: 1971

La Cage de verre (1971), translated as The Glass Cage, is a novel by Georges Simenon; it is one of the author's self-described roman durs or "hard novels" to distinguish it from his romans populaires or "popular novels," which are primarily mysteries that usually feature his famous Inspector Maigret character.

The book is divided into eight chapters and is written using the third person narrative mode.

La Cage de verre was translated into English by Antonia White for Hamish Hamilton in 1973.

== Background and composition ==
In 1927, as part of a publicity stunt that was to inaugurate a new daily paper, the Paris-Matinal, Simenon signed a contract in which he agreed, for the sum of 100,000 francs, to be locked inside a glass cage outside the Moulin Rouge. Here spectators would watch him write a complete novel whose title, characters, and plot would be chosen by referendum. The resulting work was to be serialized in the new paper, but the venture failed, and the event never took place.

The Glass Cage foreshadows Simenon's decision to retire from writing novels, which would happen a year later. As early as 1953, Simenon described in an interview conducted by the Paris Review that his method of composition, which required "depersonalizing" himself and completely entering into the mindset of his characters, caused him a great strain, which became almost unendurable after a week of writing, and was, by his own admission "one of the reasons my novels are so short." Like the main character Émile in The Glass Cage, Simenon also suffered from headaches and dizzy spells, and soon after completing work on the novel, his ailments became severe enough that checked in to a clinic for treatment.

Simenon completed the writing of this novel on 17 March 1971 in Epalinges, Switzerland.

== Plot summary ==
Émile Virieu is an antisocial, forty-three-year-old man who works as a proofreader for a small Paris publishing house. He spends his days correcting proofs in his office, which is a glass room situated near the printing machines. This "glass cage" keeps him isolated from his colleagues and provides him with a sense of security and regularity. Unable to establish a positive relationship with anyone in the society in which he lives, Émile feels like a stranger everywhere, and displays a profound indifference to the world as long as it does not intrude upon his daily schedule. With his protruding eyes and expressionless face, he knows he is unattractive to women, and his passivity masks a deep hostility to everything around him.

Despite his almost complete disconnection from society, Émile is married to Jeanne, a widow three years his senior, who worked as a typist at the same publishing house, but now works at home in the apartment they share as a translator of detective novels. He does not love her, but married her because he finds her to be as unattractive as he is, because of her submissiveness, and because he has grown tired of living in hotels. Their life together is flat and utterly banal, apart from a vacation in Italy and the purchase of a puppy for Jeanne.

The reassuring monotony of their lives is interrupted when Émile's sister Geraldine informs him that her husband Fernand is cheating on her, and that he has asked for a divorce, though for the sake of their three children, she has refused to go through with it. The forty-six year old Fernand is an exuberant and resourceful man who works in an advertising agency; he has fallen in love with one of his co-workers, Lise, a woman more than twenty years his junior, whom he wishes to marry as soon as he can get a divorce. But Fernand learns from his lawyer that the alimony he will have to pay in the event of divorce will leave him with practically nothing to live on. Shortly thereafter, Lise decides to end the affair. Fernand becomes drunk and desperate and shoots himself in front of Lise's door, outside her apartment. Despite his usual apathy towards others, Fernand's suicide leaves a deep impression on Émile.

One morning, on his way to work, Émile meets his new next-door neighbor, Lina, a pretty, childlike woman in her twenties. Every morning Émile leaves for work at the same time, as he always has, but now he notices that Lina always happens to be leaving at the same time as well. This continues for a number of days, and eventually Lina and her husband François invite Émile and Jeanne over for dessert. The newlywedded couple have recently moved into the building; François works as a sales representative and so is frequently travelling and not at home. Lina continues to meet Émile every morning on his way to work, and begins, subtly at first, to tease him. Émile begins having more frequent nightmares along with his chronic headaches, and ends up visiting a doctor who refers him to a neurologist whom he never visits.

One morning, Lina provocatively invites Émile over to her apartment when she knows that both François and Jeanne will be away. Things seem to be moving towards a sexual encounter, when Lina tells Émile that she was only joking. But Émile is not amused, and Lina becomes frightened by his expressionless face. Émile no longer sees Lina, but everyone who has ever taunted or ignored him, and he strangles her to death. Afterwards Émile returns home, settles into an armchair, takes the dog on his lap, and when Jeanne finally returns, it is with a feeling of relief that he tells her he has murdered Lina.

== Reception ==
Writing for Books Abroad, Lucille Becker describes The Glass Cage as a "fascinating psychological study."
