= Roger Lee Vernon =

American novelist

Roger Lee Vernon (1924–2017) was an American science fiction writer.

He received a master's degree from Northwestern University, traveled extensively throughout North American and Europe, and while writing his stories in the early 1950s worked as a Chicago high school teacher. In 1968 he received his PhD in history, also from Northwestern University, and afterward taught at colleges in the Chicago area and aboard US Navy ships. Retired, he lived in Elgin, Illinois with his wife, where he returned to writing. He and his wife had four children.

== Works ==
- The Space Frontiers (1955) - short story collection, published by Signet Books (Library of Congress catalog card 55–10447)
- Robot Hunt (1959) - novel
- The Fall of the American Empire - 2013: A Remembrance of Things Future (2010) - novel, published by BookSurge.
- If (2011) - short story collection, published by iUniverse.
