= Sentinels From Space =

1952 novel by Eric Frank Russell

Sentinels from Space
- First edition
- Author: Eric Frank Russell
- Cover artist: Ric Binkley
- Language: English
- Genre: Science fiction
- Published: 1952 (Bouregy & Curl, Inc.)
- Publication place: United States
- Pages: 256
- OCLC: 2205413

Sentinels From Space is a science fiction novel by English writer Eric Frank Russell, first published in 1952 by American company Bouregy & Curl, Inc.. It was adapted from a story that appeared in the November 1951 issue of Startling Stories.

== Mutants ==
At the end of Chapter One the head of the Terran Security Bureau gives David Raven a list of twelve known types of mutants based on the super-normal ability each possesses. He also lists their relative danger, I for innocuous, D for dangerous, and D+ for extremely dangerous.

- 1. True Telepaths (D+): Can read minds and, unlike sub-telepaths, can close their minds to any attempts to read them.
- 2. Levitators (D): Called floaters, they can simply defy gravity.
- 3. Pyrotics (D+): Can cause heat to appear at a distance and simply burn someone to death with a thought.
- 4. Chameleons (I): Not described, but an incident in the book implies that they can simply blend into any background.
- 5. Nocturnals (I): Never need to sleep.
- 6. Malleables (D): Have faces backed by cartilage, rather than bone, and can thus change their appearance to resemble anybody.
- 7. Hypnos (D+): With wide eyes that seem to glow, a hypno can compel anyone to believe or to do exactly what he commands.
- 8. Supersonics (I): With floppy ears, they can hear ultrasound, even at a considerable distance from its source. They can also create ultrasound and use it for bat-like sonar.
- 9. Mini-engineers (D+): With long, slender fingers and eyes so deformed that they can only see objects within four inches of their faces, they can build exquisitely tiny mechanisms, such as a cruise missile the size of a cigarette.
- 10. Radiosensitives (D): Not described.
- 11. Insectivocals (D+): Using high-pitched chirrups, they talk to insects, especially the toxic breeds found on Venus. Able to communicate with insects, they can also command them, with deadly results.
- 12. Teleports (D+): Can levitate objects but not themselves (teleport means far-carry). This is not the instantaneous transport of objects that we normally associate with the word teleport.

== Plot ==
Called before the World Council, Space Captain David Raven is told that he must stop a clandestine war being waged against Terra by people seeking independence for Mars and Venus. The Council's leader, Oswald Heraty, tells him that Humanity is on the verge of interstellar flight and that there have been hints of intelligent life "out there": Heraty wants Humanity to face any potential dangers as a unified society, so he doesn't want Mars and Venus gaining independence. After leaving the Council, David goes to see Mr. Conrad, the director of the Terran Security Bureau. As true telepaths, Conrad and David speak mind to mind. Conrad gives David a list of the twelve known types of mutants and notes that the clandestine war is being waged by mutants sabotaging Terran infrastructure.

David returns to the home that he shares with his companion, Leina, and shortly a team of phony police officers arrives. David switches bodies with the hypno and then with hypnotic power convinces the others on his team that David has already left. Later David reverses the switch and obtains from the shaken hypno the identity of the leader of the sabotage effort, a Venusian insectivocal named Arthur Kayder. Visiting Kayder, David obtains from Kayder's valet the information he wants on the underground base from with the saboteurs launch their attacks. He then goes to the spaceport and boards a ship bound for Venus.

Just before the ship lands David jumps out an airlock and lands gently in the forest below, then he walks to Plain City, where he meets up with Charles and Mavis, his and Leina's counterparts on Venus. He tells Charles and Mavis that he has come to Venus to find the man in charge of the clandestine war and get him to stop. When Mavis objects that it's none of their business, David tells her about the impending leap into interstellar space, which will hasten Humanity's meeting with the Denebs. Horrified, Charles tells David that he needs to deal with a power-behind-the-throne guy named Thorstein and that he's going to help.

With the purest insouciance, David and Charles enter Thorstein's castle, defeating every one of its security systems. They assassinate Thorstein's decoy and wait for Thorstein himself to arrive. After Thorstein arrives and quickly departs, David and Charles kidnap him from his helicopter and take him to Charles and Mavis's house. There the two men convince Thorstein to abandon his war against Terra, pointing out that he likely won't live long enough to become Emperor of Venus, that some unworthy stooge will get to enjoy that role.

Having completed his mission, David steals a rocketship and returns to Terra, letting Conrad clean up the legal mess he has created. He joins Leina in catching up on news, beamed telepathically across interstellar space, regarding the movements of the Denebs. Several weeks later he and Leina are picked up and taken to meet Major Lomax of Terrestrial Intelligence.

They are sealed inside a bunker alone with Lomax, who is in so much pain from an accident that he does not care whether he lives or dies. In order to walk out of the bunker alive, David and Leina must convince hidden observers that they are ordinary, if artful, telepaths and not, as has been hinted, zombies controlled by extraterrestrial beings (which, in fact, is what they are). Charles and Mavis are being subjected to an identical interrogation on Venus. The four zombies play their roles perfectly as their replacements appear on Terra and Venus, then, after the suspicions have been allayed, Lomax has an attack of intense pain. Feigning concern, David and Leina jump up as if to help and at the same time subject Lomax to a telepathic attack that makes him trigger the devices that kill all six of them.

Lomax regains consciousness in a realm where all pain is gone. He learns of the Denebs, advanced creatures possessed of a collective inferiority complex that they hide under delusions of superiority so brittle that the mere thought of creatures equal to them sends them into a genocidal rage. The secret that must be kept from Humanity, lest the Denebs discover it, is that humans are the larval form of creatures vastly superior to the Denebs.

== Reviews ==
Dave Langford reviewed Sentinels From Space for White Dwarf #99, and stated that "Awful, because metaphors about 'great bright-eyed moths beating gloriously through the endless night' fit terribly into a threadbare plotline consisting largely of psychic mutants swapping cliched wisecracks and mayhem."

== Sources ==
- Edwards, Malcolm, Brian M Stableford, John Clute and David Redd. "Russell, Eric Frank". The Encyclopedia of Science Fiction. Eds. John Clute, David Langford, Peter Nicholls and Graham Sleight. Gollancz, 28 Oct. 2014. Web. 2 Mar. 2015.
- Tuck, Donald H. (1974). The Encyclopedia of Science Fiction and Fantasy. Chicago: Advent. ISBN 0-911682-20-1.
