= Diane Detzer =

Diane Detzer de Reyna (May 13, 1930 – 1992) was an American science fiction writer in the 1960s, under her own name and the pseudonyms Adam Lukens and Jorge de Reyna.

== Early life ==
Dorothy Diane Detzer was from Ridgefield, Connecticut, the daughter of August J. Detzer, a Navy captain, and Dorothy Allee Shields Detzer. Her grandmother, Laura Goshorn Detzer, was the first public librarian in Fort Wayne, Indiana. Her aunt, Dorothy Detzer, was a prominent peace activist. Her uncle, Karl Detzer, was a screenwriter and an editor at Reader's Digest.

Diane Detzer attended Barnard College, the Pennsylvania State University, and a secretarial school in Newtown, Connecticut.

== Career ==
Books by Detzer (as Adam Lukens, Adam de Lukens, Jorge de Reyna, and Diane Detzer) included The Sea People (1959), Conquest of Life (1960), Sons of the Wolf (1961), The Glass Cage (1962), The World Within (1962), Alien World (1963), Eevalu (1963), The Return of the Starships (1968), and Planet of Fear (1968). In addition, she published a story, "The Tomb" (Science Fiction Stories, 1958).

== Republication ==
In 2023, Critical Press Media obtained the rights to republish Detzer's Intergalactic League books under her real name, beginning with The Sea People.

== Personal life ==
Diane Detzer married Arthur Rolan Lukens Jr. in 1955. She had two children, Peter and Margaret. She died in 1992, aged 62 years. Her gravesite is in Ridgefield, and family photographs of her are in the collection of the Ridgefield Historical Society.
