= Eric Frank Russell =

English science fiction writer

- Born: January 6, 1905
- Died: February 28, 1978 (aged 73)
- Occupation: Novelist
- Writing career
- Genre: Science fiction

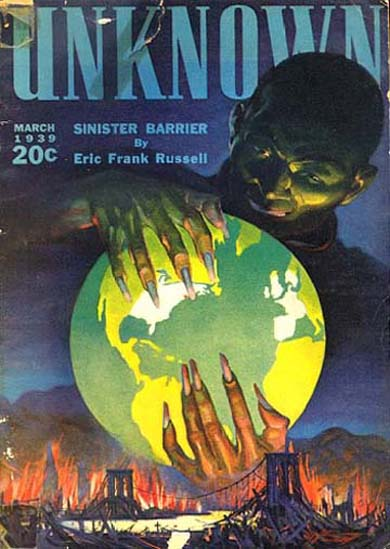
Russell's classic "Sinister Barrier" was the cover story for Unknown No. 1 (1939-03)

Eric Frank Russell (January 6, 1905 – February 28, 1978) was a British writer best known for his science fiction novels and short stories. Much of his work was first published in the United States, in John W. Campbell's Astounding Science Fiction and other pulp magazines. Russell also wrote horror fiction for Weird Tales and non-fiction articles on Fortean topics. Up to 1955 several of his stories were published under pseudonyms, including Duncan H. Munro and Niall(e) Wilde.

== Biography ==
Russell was born in 1905 near Sandhurst in Berkshire, where his father was an instructor at the Royal Military College. Russell became a fan of science fiction and in 1934, while living near Liverpool, he saw a letter in Amazing Stories from Leslie J. Johnson, another reader from the same area. Russell met with Johnson, who encouraged him to embark on a writing career. Together, the two men wrote a novella, "Seeker of Tomorrow", that was published by F. Orlin Tremaine in the July 1937 number of Astounding Stories. (Note: Two novelettes by Russell alone preceded "Seeker for Tomorrow", in the February and April numbers of the monthly, and a short story followed in December, the third issue after Campbell succeeded Tremaine as editor. One more of his stories was published that year, by Walter H. Gillings in Tales of Wonder #1, the first issue of Britain's first professional SF magazine (1937, no month). Johnson had not yet published any speculative fiction. He and Russell also collaborated on one story published decades later, "Eternal Rediffusion" (Weird Tales, September 1973).) Both Russell and Johnson became members of the British Interplanetary Society.

There are two incompatible accounts of Russell's military service during World War II. The official, well-documented version is that he served with the Royal Air Force, with whom he saw active service in Europe as a member of a Mobile Signals Unit. However, in the introduction to the 1986 Del Rey Books edition of Russell's novel Wasp, Jack L. Chalker states that Russell was too old for active service, and instead worked for Military Intelligence in London, where he "spent the war dreaming up nasty tricks to play against the Germans and Japanese", including Operation Mincemeat. Russell's biographer John L. Ingham states however that "there is nothing, absolutely nothing, in his R.A.F. record to show that he was anything more than a wireless mechanic and radio operator".

Into Your Tent, a thorough and detailed biography of Russell by John L. Ingham, was published in 2010 by Plantech (UK).

== Writing career ==
Russell's first novel was Sinister Barrier, cover story for the inaugural, May 1939 issue of Unknown—Astounding's sister magazine devoted to fantasy. It is explicitly a Fortean tale, based on Charles Fort's famous speculation "I think we're property", Russell explains in the foreword. An often-repeated legend has it that Campbell, on receiving the manuscript for Sinister Barrier, created Unknown primarily as a vehicle for the short novel (pp. 9–94). There is no real evidence for this, despite a statement to that effect in the first volume of Isaac Asimov's autobiography, In Memory Yet Green.

His second novel, Dreadful Sanctuary (serialized in Astounding during 1948) is an early example of conspiracy fiction, in which a paranoid delusion of global proportions is perpetuated by a small but powerful secret society.

Russell took up writing full-time in the late 1940s. He became an active member of British science fiction fandom and the British representative of the Fortean Society. He won the first annual Hugo Award for Best Short Story in 1955 recognizing his humorous "Allamagoosa" as the year's best science fiction.

In 1970, Russell was paid £4689 by the Beatles' company Apple Corps for the motion picture rights to his novel Wasp, the contract being signed on behalf of Apple by Ringo Starr. The film was never made, but it remained one of the most lucrative deals Russell ever made.

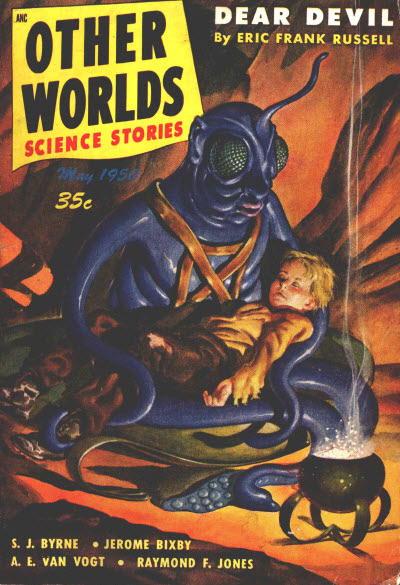
Russell's novelette "Dear Devil" was the cover story in the May 1950 issue of Other Worlds Science Stories

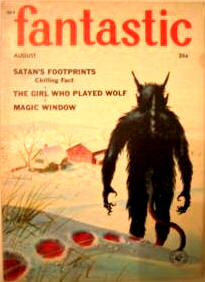
Russell's essay "Satan's Footprints" was cover-featured on the August 1958 issue of Fantastic

Russell also wrote a large number of shorter works, many of which have been reprinted in collections such as Deep Space (1954), Six Worlds Yonder (1958), Far Stars (1961), Dark Tides (1962) and Somewhere a Voice (1965).

Russell wrote numerous non-fiction essays on Fortean themes, some of which were collected in a compendium of Forteana entitled Great World Mysteries (1957). His second non-fiction book was The Rabble Rousers (1963), a sardonic look at human folly including the Dreyfus affair and the Florida land boom. He also wrote Lern Yerself Scouse: The ABZ of Scouse (1966) under the pseudonym "Linacre Lane".

== Writing style and themes ==
Russell had an easy-going, colloquial writing style that was influenced in part by American "hard-boiled" detective fiction of the kind popularized by Black Mask magazine. Although British, Russell wrote predominantly for an American audience, and was often assumed to be American by readers.

Much of Russell's science fiction is based on what might be described as Fortean themes, with Sinister Barrier and Dreadful Sanctuary the most notable examples. Another common theme is the single resourceful human pitted against a ponderous alien bureaucracy, as in the novels Wasp and Next of Kin, as well as several shorter works.

Russell is sometimes categorized as a humorous writer, and Brian Aldiss describes him as John W. Campbell's "licensed jester". However, Russell's humour generally has a satirical edge, often aimed at authority and bureaucracy in its various forms. On other occasions, for example in the short stories "Somewhere a Voice" and "The Army Comes to Venus", his work has a deeper and more serious tone, in which the spiritual aspects of humanity's endeavours and aspirations shine through.

== Legacy ==
The 1962 novel The Great Explosion won a Prometheus Hall of Fame Award in 1985—the third naming of two works to the libertarian science fiction hall of fame. The 1957 novel Wasp has been a finalist for the honor, which is now limited to one work per year.

The Science Fiction and Fantasy Hall of Fame inducted Russell in 2000, its fifth class of two deceased and two living writers.

Two omnibus collections of Russell's science fiction are available from NESFA Press: Major Ingredients (2000), containing 30 of his short stories, and Entities (2001) containing five novels. John Pelan's Midnight House published Darker Tides, a collection of Russell's horror and weird fiction, in 2006.

Scott Connors, reviewing Russell's book Darker Tides, stated that "Russell's prose displays a rare sense of irony and wit...and does the reader the compliment of presenting the story in an indirect fashion so that he has an investment in the tale." Carl Sagan wrote that Russell's stories were examples of "desperately need[ed] exploration of alternative futures, both experimental and conceptual".

The 1995 novel Design for Great-Day, published as by Alan Dean Foster and Eric Frank Russell, is an expansion by Foster of a 1953 short story of the same name by Russell.

== Bibliography ==
=== Novels ===
- Sinister Barrier (1939). Revised and expanded in 1943 and 1948.
- Dreadful Sanctuary (1948). Revised for US edition (Lancer, 1963).
- Sentinels From Space (Bouregy & Curl, 1953). Based on earlier magazine story "The Star Watchers" (1951).
- Three to Conquer (Avalon Books, 1956). Based on earlier magazine serial "Call Him Dead" (1955).
- Wasp (Avalon Books, 1957). Revised and expanded for UK edition (Dennis Dobson, 1958).
- The Space Willies (Ace, 1958). Based on earlier magazine story "Plus X" (1956). Revised and expanded as Next of Kin (Dennis Dobson, 1959).
- The Great Explosion (Dennis Dobson, 1962)
- With a Strange Device (Dennis Dobson, 1964). Also published as The Mindwarpers (Lancer, 1965)

=== Collections ===
- Deep Space (1954)
- Men, Martians and Machines (1955), containing four related novellas
- Six Worlds Yonder (1958)
- Far Stars (1961)
- Dark Tides (1962)
- Somewhere a Voice (1965)
- Like Nothing on Earth (1975)
- The Best of Eric Frank Russell (1978)

== See also ==
- "Study in Still Life" – story by Russell
- Golden Age of Science Fiction
