= City of Sorcery =

1984 novel by Marion Zimmer Bradley

- Cover of the first edition
- Author: Marion Zimmer Bradley
- Cover artist: James Gurney
- Language: English
- Series: Darkover
- Genre: Science fantasy
- Publisher: DAW Books
- Publication date: 1984
- Publication place: United States
- Media type: Print (paperback)
- Pages: 423
- ISBN: 0-87997-962-3
- OCLC: 11271091
- Preceded by: Thendara House
- Followed by: Star of Danger

City of Sorcery is a science fantasy novel by American writer Marion Zimmer Bradley, part of her Darkover series. A sequel to Thendara House, it was originally published by DAW Books (No. 600) in October 1984.

In terms of the Darkover timeline, City of Sorcery falls in the era identified by the author as Recontact (Against the Terrans: The First Age).

== Plot summary ==
City of Sorcery begins five years after the end of Thendara House. The Renunciates and a select group of Terran women who have agreed to abide by Renunciate laws have formed The Bridge Society, to facilitate understanding between the two groups.

Magda Lorne learns from her supervisor, Cholayna Ares, that a Terran operative, Alexis Anders, has survived a plane crash in the Hellers a week earlier. Five days later, she appeared at the spaceport with amnesia. Cholayna believes Anders' memory has been tampered with and wants Magda to use her laran abilities to help recover her memories. After a bit of telepathic probing, Anders abruptly appears to have recovered, though she remembers nothing of her past week's ordeal.

Later, in retelling the story to Camilla at the Guildhouse, Magda recalls her three previous experiences with mystical visions of the Dark Sisterhood, and crows, which seem to be their avatars. Camilla tells Magda that the Sisterhood is a secret society; that she and Jaelle were both invited to join, but refused. With Jaelle's assistance, Magda makes contact with the Forbidden Tower, but they are unable to explain Anders' experiences.

Rafaella undertakes a travel commission from Alexis Anders, but leaves a note behind for Jaelle. Magda tells Cholayna that Alexis has taken the expedition under false pretenses. Cholayna, Magda, Vanessa, Jaelle, and Camilla set out to follow Alexis. The expedition takes them high into the Hellers, through treacherous terrain. Magda goes into the Overworld to ask the advice of the Forbidden Tower, but is confronted by an ancient crone who repeatedly warns her to turn back. Magda refuses.

The Terran women suffer frostbite and altitude sickness, but continue despite their troubles. After about a week, they continue on their way, crossing the Kadarin River, and arrive at the city of Nevarsin. An arrogant leronis, who calls herself Acquilara, greets them with a great deal of self-importance and bluster. The women are suspicious of her and decide to leave the city. Cholayna's altitude sickness gets worse, as do the travel conditions.

High in the Hellers, they meet Kyntha, who explains that they have arrived at the holy house of the goddess, Avarra, and offers to care for their injuries. Cholayna takes more than a week to recover. The women who care for them recoil at Acquilara's name, declaring her evil.

Marisela, a sister from the Thendara guildhouse, known to also be a member of the sisterhood, arrives, having followed their entire journey. She explains that she serves the sisterhood, but is not one of them.

The group continues on in their journey, now seeking in earnest the mysterious city of the sisterhood. As they arrive at a pass that gives them a view of the mountains known as the "wall around the world", Marisela is killed, apparently by Acquilara. The others fall unconscious and awake in a cave.

Alexis Anders arrives, apparently under the control of Acquilara. She speaks abusively to all of those who have been attempting her rescue. She leads Magda to Acquilara, who turns out to have a political agenda and wants to exploit Magda's connections with the Forbidden Tower. Magda refuses to help.

Magda and the others attempt an escape, but are recaptured. Magda has a vision of Kyntha, who tells her not to hate her captures, that it gives Acquilara entry into their minds. Again, they attempt to escape and find themselves in an all out fight. Jaelle attacks Acquilara, and in the fight, both fall over a cliff and are killed. Alexis is wounded, and also dies.

Kyntha now asks each of them what they seek. Camilla and Magda choose to enter the city of the sisterhood, while the others return to Thendara.

== Place in Darkovan history ==
City of Sorcery is the final book of a trilogy, following The Shattered Chain and Thendara House, telling part of the story of Jaelle n'ha Melora (Jaelle Aillard). Outside the books of this trilogy, it is revealed that Jaelle was the mother of Cleindori (Dorilys Aillard), and Damon Ridenow, the protagonist in The Spell Sword, was her father.

== Characters ==
- Magda Lorne (aka Margali n'ha Yasbet)
- Jaelle n'ha Melora, a Renunciate travel organizer.
- Camilla n'ha Kyria, an older Renunciate.
- Rafaella n'ha Doria, a Renunciate travel organizer.
- Cholayna Ares, a Terran intelligence supervisor.
- Alexis "Lexie" Anders, an ambitious Terran operative.

== Reception ==
Wendy Graham reviewed City of Sorcery for Adventurer magazine and stated that "That comment would seem to give the hint that I don’t enjoy reading any of these novels. I do, it is just that, that is the impression with which I am left.... hoping that Marion Zimmer Bradley will, someday, wave her magic pen and sort everything out for all these women. They deserve it."

== Sources ==
- Brown, Charles N.; William G. Contento (November 20, 2007). "The Locus Index to Science Fiction (1984-1998)".
- Jaffery, Sheldon (1987). Future and Fantastic Worlds. Mercer Island, Washington: Starmont House. p. 206. ISBN 1-55742-002-5.
- City of Sorcery title listing at the Internet Speculative Fiction Database
