= The Fall of Neskaya =

2001 novel by Marion Zimmer Bradley

- Dust-jacket from the first edition
- Author: Marion Zimmer Bradley; Deborah J. Ross
- Cover artist: Romas Kukalis
- Language: English
- Series: Darkover
- Genre: Science fantasy
- Publisher: DAW Books
- Publication date: 2001
- Publication place: United States
- Media type: Print (hardback)
- Pages: 431
- ISBN: 0-7564-0034-1
- OCLC: 47286149
- Dewey Decimal: 813/.54 21
- LC Class: PS3552.R228 F35 2001
- Preceded by: Thunderlord!
- Followed by: Zandru's Forge, Hawkmistress!

The Fall of Neskaya is a science fantasy novel by American writers Marion Zimmer Bradley and Deborah J. Ross, part of the Darkover series. Set in The Hundred Kingdoms time period, the book is the first in a three-novel series subtitled The Clingfire trilogy. The Fall of Neskaya is followed by Zandru's Forge, which takes place about 25 years later.

The books in The Clingfire trilogy explore, by analogy, the concept of mutually assured destruction and the use of chemical weapons whose consequences are beyond the control of the user. Bradley's "Compact" gives the Darkovans a way out of this trap through a moral agreement to abjure any weapons that do not place the users within arms' reach of each other (i.e. swords and knives). This development in Darkover's social order and its author, Varzil the Good, is referenced in most of the earlier and later books, but had not been fully explored before this trilogy.

Damian Deslucido and his brother, Rumail, exhibit a Macbeth-Lady Macbeth relationship: Rumail's raw ambition drives his rather hollow brother to excesses of power that he would not have sought on his own, and ultimately destroys both of them.

The story of the Deslucido brothers is told as an old legend in Dorothy J. Heydt's "The Wind Man" in the 1993 Darkover anthology Towers of Darkover, though the surname is not explicitly mentioned.

== Plot summary ==
=== Book One ===
A larenzu, Rumail Deslucido, arrives at Verdanta Castle, to make an alliance between Verdanta and his brother, Damian Deslucido, the ambitious king of Ambervale and Linn. Rumail tests each of the children for laran, then arranges a proxy marriage between the youngest daughter, Kristlin (who dies about a year later). He sends the youngest son, Coryn, to Tramontana Tower.

At Tramontana, Coryn learns to control his laran, and to put aside his differences with the rival Storn family. The Tower's keeper, Kieran, believes that the Towers should be neutral in the many petty wars of the Hundred Kingdoms, and should not supply laran weapons to anyone.

Rumail Deslucido and his brother King Damian scheme to control more of the minor kingdoms of the Hellers, hoping eventually to challenge the Hasturs of the lowlands. Rumail reveals his laran ability – lying under truthspell and twisting the minds of others to do the same. Eventually, Rumail is dismissed from Neskaya Tower for immoral or illegal use of laran.

=== Book Two ===
Cover of the paperback reprint.

Taniquel Hastur-Acosta experiences a premonition of danger moments before Deslucido attacks Acosta Castle. The castle falls, but Taniquel escapes. In the forest, she meets Coryn, who gives her some of his supplies. After several days, they separate – she bound for Thendara and he for Neskaya.

Taniquel reaches Thendara, and describes these events to her uncle, King Rafael Hastur II. A month or so later, minor nobles from the Acosta region arrive to request Hastur protection from Deslucido. Taniquel agrees to ride at the head of the army in the name of her unborn son. She foresees that Deslucido will eventually bring his armies to Hastur's doorstep.

Damian Deslucido requests that the Comyn Council return Taniquel to his control. Under the power of his brother's ability to defeat truthspell, he lies convincingly. Taniquel tells her uncle what she has observed (Deslucido says she was allowed to sit vigil with her late husband, but in reality, she was locked in her room). Ultimately, King Rafael believes her and supports her claim. It is clear that Deslucido will declare war on Hastur.

=== Book Three ===
Aran, a matrix worker at Tramontana, informs Coryn that war is coming, and that the two towers must cease contact. Coryn urges his Neskaya colleagues to refuse to make laran weapons, such as clingfire.

Belisar Deslucido's forces are defeated in battle by the Hastur forces. Rumail, meanwhile, intends to deploy a laran weapon, but the Hastur laranzu'in explode the device early. Belisar deserts his dying men. Rumail survives, owing to compassionate assistance from the Hastur laranzu'in, and makes his way back to his brother.

Coryn leads Rafael Hastur's forces through the mountains at Verdanta, freeing his siblings from Deslucido's men. They gather local men to join the fight. Coryn's sister, Margarida, leaves for Thendara to join the Sisterhood of the Sword.

=== Book Four ===
Coryn returns to Neskaya Tower and urges his colleagues to join Hastur's cause.

Damian Deslucido learns that Verdanta Castle has been freed by Hastur. He marches out to meet the Hastur army. Taniquel, as regent queen of Acosta, joins the Hastur forces. They come under laran attack from Tramontana Tower, which Rumail now controls, but are able to throw off the veil of confusion. Taniquel ventures into the Overworld to organizes a counterattack by Hali and Neskaya Towers.

Neskaya and Tramontana attack each other in the Overworld. Rumail believes that a post-hypnotic suggestion he has implanted in Coryn years earlier will prevent Coryn from acting against him. Coryn is able to overcome Rumail, and Tramontana tower crumbles. Neskaya begins to crumble also.

=== Book Five ===
In battle, Taniquel takes Belisar Deslucido prisoner. She demands to know if he, also, has the ability to lie under truthspell. He confirms that he does. She learns that his father, Damian, has also been captured. Taniquel recommends to King Rafael that both be executed to wipe out the laran trait for lying under truthspell. After an audience with both men, Rafael comes to agree with Taniquel, and has them hung.

Taniquel learns that contact with Neskaya has been lost. She and her men ride to Neskaya and learn that the tower has collapsed. The surviving tower workers tell her that Coryn is trapped in the Overworld.

Taniquel enters the Overworld in an attempt to free Coryn. She encounters what's left of Rumail Deslucido, and he tries to kill her, but fails. She finds Coryn but learns that he cannot leave the Overworld with his laran intact. She asks him to choose, and he chooses to return to the world with her.

Taniquel returns to Acosta, as regent for her infant son, with Coryn at her side as consort and paxman.

=== Epilogue ===
A ragged man, apparently Rumail Deslucido, arrives in a small village along the Kadarin River, with vengeance on his mind.

== Characters ==
- Coryn Leynier, third son of Lord Beltran Leynier of Verdanta, laranzu.
- Taniquel Hastur-Acosta, niece of King Rafael Hastur II.
- Damian Deslucido, king of Ambervale-Linn.
- Rumail Deslucido, nedestro brother of Damian Deslucido, laranzu, dismissed from Neskaya Tower.
- Belisar Deslucido, son of Damian Deslucido.
- Rafael Hastur II, king of Hastur.

== Publication history ==
- 2001, USA, DAW Books ISBN 0-7564-0034-1, pub date July 2001, hardback
- 2001, USA, Science Fiction Book Club #39176, pub date September 2001, hardcover
- 2002, USA, DAW Books ISBN 0-7564-0053-8, pub date July 2002, paperback
