= Rediscovery =

1993 novel by Marion Zimmer Bradley

- First edition
- Author: Marion Zimmer Bradley / Mercedes Lackey
- Cover artist: Romas Kukalis
- Language: English
- Series: Darkover
- Genre: Science fantasy
- Publisher: DAW Books
- Publication date: 1993
- Publication place: United States
- Media type: Print (hardcover)
- Pages: 307
- ISBN: 0-88677-561-2
- Preceded by: The Heirs of Hammerfell
- Followed by: The Shattered Chain

Rediscovery is a science fantasy novel by American writers Marion Zimmer Bradley and Mercedes Lackey, part of the Darkover series of novels and short stories published in the United States since 1958. It was first published by DAW Books in 1993.

Rediscovery deals with Earth's reestablishment of contact with the lost human colony on the planet Darkover after centuries of societal development on the colony world. It presents the backstory for The Sword of Aldones, Sharra's Exile, and The Heritage of Hastur. The story take place between 2,000 and 5,000 years after human colonization of the planet in Darkover Landfall.

== Plot summary ==
On Darkover, Lorill Hastur accompanies his twin, Leonie, to Dalereuth Tower for training. The keeper, Fiora, discovers that she has amazing but undisciplined laran powers.

A Terran ship heads towards Cottman's Star, seeking possible descendants of pre-Empire lost colony ships of the distant past. After observing the weather patterns and geography of the planet from space, a shuttle attempts to land. It crashes in the mountains during a snowstorm and is rescued by men from Aldaran. At Aldaran Castle, they are greeted by Kermiac of Aldaran, who can speak to Elizabeth because she is a telepath. Elizabeth explains that they are an expedition from the stars looking for descendants of the Lost Ships.

Leonie Hastur perceives a threat coming to Darkover from one of the moons. She uses her laran to link to one of the minds on the Terran ship and listen to the crew conversations, though she does not understand all of what she hears. She reports to Keeper Fiora that strangers are lost in a storm near Aldaran. Leonie contacts her twin telepathically, and tells Lorill to go to Aldaran.

After several days, Elizabeth tells Commander MacAran that Darkover should be considered a closed world, since otherwise, Darkover will simply be plundered. The others disagree. With Kermiac's approval, the Terrans begin building a spaceport at the city of Caer Donn.

Leonie is sent to Arilinn for more advanced training. She establishes a telepathic link with one of the Terrans, Ysaye Barnett, and they converse frequently. Ysaye introduces Leonie to Terran music.

Elizabeth and Ysaye are deliberately exposed to kireseth pollen by Ryan Evans, a crew member who means them harm. Ysaye, with Leonie's assistance, destroys Ryan Evans' experiments with the kireseth flowers. Evans attacks her and Leonie responds, using Ysaye's body. Evans is killed. Ysaye is severely injured and eventually dies.

Lorill Hastur reports to the Comyn Council his recommendation that they should have no contact with the Terrans.

== Characters ==
=== Terrans ===
- Ysaye Barnett, computer specialist of African descent.
- Elizabeth MacKintosh, cultural anthropologist & telepath.
- David Lorne, cultural anthropologist, Elizabeth's fiancee.
- Zeb Scott, pilot, future father of Marjorie Scott.
- Ryan Evans

=== Darkovans ===
- Lorill Hastur, twin of Leonie.
- Leonie Hastur, twin of Lorill.
- Fiora, Keeper of Dalereuth.
- Kermiac of Aldaran, Lord of Aldaran.
- Felicia Darriell, Kermiac's foster sister.
- Ramon Kadarin, paxman of Kermiac, a chieri-human hybrid.
- Thyra Darriell, future mother of Marguerida Alton.

== Inconsistencies with other books in the series ==
Rediscovery creates several timeline problems with other books in the Darkover series.

- Kermiac is described in Rediscovery as appearing to be in his early fifties. Leonie Hastur is described as age 16. In The Forbidden Tower, which takes place about 40 years later, Valdir Alton is about age 11. He must father Kennard Alton, who in turn fathers Lew Alton. Lew is about 30 when Kermiac dies as a result of the Sharra Matrix experiments. This makes Kermiac about 150 at his death.
- Described as a newborn in this book, Thyra is described as a fairly young woman in The Sword of Aldones and Sharra's Exile. Based on the same calculations, Thyra would have been close to 100 at the time of the Sharra Matrix experiments.
- Zeb Scott, who is a minor character in this book, is a thirtyish Terran pilot. Later books describe him as the husband of Felicia Darriell and the father of at least two of her children – Rafe Scott and Marjorie Scott. Both are described as being about the same age as Lew Alton in The Sword of Aldones and Sharra's Exile. Even taking into account their chieri lineage, this would still suggest that Zeb fathered these children when he was close to 100 years old.

== Publication history ==
- 1993, USA, DAW Books, 0-88677-561-2, pub. date Mar 1993, hardcover
- 1993, USA, SFBC, #00997, pub. date June 1993, hardcover
- 1994, USA, DAW Books, 0-88677-529-9, pub. date June 1994, paperback

== Bibliography ==
- Brown, Charles N.; William G. Contento (November 20, 2007). "The Locus Index to Science Fiction (1984-1998)".
