= Domains of Darkover =

1990 anthology edited by Marion Zimmer Bradley

- Cover of the first edition
- Author: Edited by Marion Zimmer Bradley
- Cover artist: Richard Hescox
- Language: English
- Series: Darkover
- Genre: Fantasy; Science fiction
- Publisher: DAW Books
- Publication date: 1990
- Publication place: United States
- Media type: Print (paperback)
- Pages: 254
- ISBN: 0-88677-407-1
- OCLC: 21185883
- LC Class: CPB Box no. 2777 vol. 1

Domains of Darkover is an anthology of fantasy and science fiction short stories edited by Marion Zimmer Bradley. The stories are set in Bradley's world of Darkover. The book was first published by DAW Books (No. 810) in March 1990.

== Contents ==
- Introduction: "And Contrariwise" by Marion Zimmer Bradley
- "'Acurrhir Todo; Nada Perdonad" by Deborah Wheeler
- "An Object Lesson" by Mercedes Lackey
- "Beginnings" by Cynthia Drolet
- "Clingfire" by Patricia Duffy Novak
- "Death in Thendara" by Dorothy J. Heydt
- "Firetrap" by Elisabeth Waters and Marion Zimmer Bradley
- "Friends" by Judith K. Kobylecky
- "Manchild" by L. D. Woeltjen
- "Just a Touch...", by Lynne Armstrong-Jones
- "Mind-eater" by Joan Marie Verba
- "Mists" by Meg Mac Donald
- "Our Little Rabbit" by Mary K. Frey
- "The Gift from Ardais" by Barbara Denz
- "The Horse Race" by Diann Partridge
- "The Plague" by Janet R. Rhodes
- "The Tapestry" by Micole Sudberg
- "To Serve Kihar" by Judith Sampson

== Sources ==
- Brown, Charles N.; William G. Contento (2007-11-20). "The Locus Index to Science Fiction (1984-1998)".
- Reginald, Robert (1992). Science Fiction and Fantasy Literature 1975-1991. Detroit: Gale Research. pp. 116. ISBN 0-8103-1825-3.
- Silver, Steven. "DAW Books List". SF Site. Archived from the original on 2004-02-15.
- Domains of Darkover title listing at the Internet Speculative Fiction Database
