= Renunciates of Darkover =

1991 anthology edited by Marion Zimmer Bradley

- Cover of the first edition
- Author: Edited by Marion Zimmer Bradley
- Cover artist: Richard Hescox
- Language: English
- Series: Darkover
- Genre: Fantasy; Science fiction
- Publisher: DAW Books
- Publication date: 1991
- Publication place: United States
- Media type: Print (paperback)
- Pages: 317
- ISBN: 0-88677-469-1
- OCLC: 23164481

Renunciates of Darkover is an anthology of fantasy and science fiction short stories edited by Marion Zimmer Bradley. The stories are set in Bradley's world of Darkover. The book was first published by DAW Books (No. 844) in March 1991.

== Contents ==
- Introduction by Marion Zimmer Bradley
- "Strife" by Chel Avery
- "Amazon Fragment" (from the first draft of Thendara House) by Marion Zimmer Bradley
- "Broken Vows" by Annette Rodriguez
- "If Only Banshees Could See" by Janet R. Rhodes
- "A Midsummer Night's Gift" by Deborah Wheeler
- "The Honor of the Guild" by Joan Marie Verba
- "A Butterfly Season" by Diana L. Paxson
- "Misjudged Situations" by Kelly B. Jaggers
- "Awakening" by Mary Fenoglio
- "Carlina's Calling" by Patricia Duffy Novak
- "A Beginning" by Judith Kobylecky
- "Set a Thief" by Mercedes Lackey
- "Shut-in" by Jean Lamb
- "Danila's Song" by Vera Nazarian
- "A Proper Escort" by Elisabeth Waters
- "The Lesson in the Foothills" by Lynne Armstrong-Jones
- "Summer Fair" by Emily Alward
- "Varzil's Avengers" by Diann S. Partridge
- "To Touch a Comyn" by Andrew Rey
- "About Time" by Patricia B. Cirone
- "Family Visit" by Margaret L. Carter
- "Dalereuth Guild House" by Priscilla W. Armstrong

== Sources ==
- Brown, Charles N.; William G. Contento (2007-11-20). "The Locus Index to Science Fiction (1984-1998)".
- Reginald, Robert (1992). Science Fiction and Fantasy Literature 1975-1991. Detroit: Gale Research. pp. 116. ISBN 0-8103-1825-3.
- Silver, Steven. "DAW Books List". SF Site. Archived from the original on 2004-02-15.
- Renunciates of Darkover title listing at the Internet Speculative Fiction Database
