= Music of Darkover =

2013 anthology

- Cover of the first edition
- Editor: Elisabeth Waters
- Language: English
- Series: Darkover
- Genre: Fantasy; Science fiction
- Publisher: Marion Zimmer Bradley Literary Works Trust
- Publication date: 03-06-2013
- Publication place: United States
- Media type: Print (paperback)
- Pages: 250
- ISBN: 978-1-938185-24-3
- OCLC: 864717382
- Preceded by: Snows of Darkover
- Followed by: Stars of Darkover

Music of Darkover (Darkover Anthology #13) is an anthology of fantasy and science fiction short stories and poems edited by American writer Elisabeth Waters. The stories are set in Marion Zimmer Bradley's world of Darkover. This book focuses on the music of Darkover.

The book was first published by Marion Zimmer Bradley Literary Works Trust.

== Contents ==
- Introduction, by Elisabeth Waters
- "The Horsetamer's Daughter", by Leslie Fish (poem)
- "Tower of Horses", by Leslie Fish
- "Right to Choose", by India Edghill
- "All Who Breathe are Chained", by Rosemary Edghill
- "Danila's Song", by Vera Nazarian
- "Darkover through the Flowinglass", by Margaret Davis
- Introduction: Traditional Darkovan Music, by Elisabeth Waters
- "Seagull of the Land-Under-Waves", poem by uncredited
- "Caristiona", poem by uncredited
- "Fairy's Love Song (Tha mi sgith)", poem by uncredited
- "The Mull Fisher's Love Song (O Mhairead Og!)", poem by uncredited
- "The Coolin of Rūm (Am Fuar Bheinn)", poem by uncredited
- Introduction: Songs by Marion Zimmer Bradley, by Elisabeth Waters
- "The Ballad of Hastur & Cassilda", by Marion Zimmer Bradley (poem)
- "The Outlaw", by Marion Zimmer Bradley (poem)
- Introduction: Darkovan Filk Songs, by Elisabeth Waters
- "Lament of a Comyn Keeper", by Cynthia McQuillin (poem)
- "The Chieri", by Cynthia McQuillin (poem)
- "Exile", by Cynthia McQuillin (poem)
- "Lament of a Drytown Bride", by Cynthia McQuillin (poem)
- "Chains", by Cynthia McQuillin (poem)
- "Bridal lament", by Cynthia McQuillin (poem)
- "Darkover Wedding Song", by Cynthia McQuillin (poem)
- "Golden Bell", by Cynthia McQuillin (poem)
- "The Starstone and the Mirror Ball", by Raul S. Reyes
- "The Music of the Spheres", by Michael Spence
- "Poetic License", by Mercedes Lackey
- "A Capella", by Elisabeth Waters
- "A Song for Capella", by Elisabeth Waters (poem)
