= Storm Queen =

Storm Queen may refer to:

- Storm Queen (horse), a racehorse
- Morgan Geist, American musician known as "Storm Queen".

== See also ==
- Stormqueen!, a novel by Marion Zimmer Bradley
