= Leroni of Darkover =

1991 anthology edited by Marion Zimmer Bradley

- Cover of the first edition
- Editor: Marion Zimmer Bradley
- Cover artist: Richard Hescox
- Language: English
- Series: Darkover
- Genre: Fantasy; Science fiction
- Publisher: DAW Books
- Publication date: 1991
- Publication place: United States
- Media type: Print (paperback)
- Pages: 334
- ISBN: 0-88677-494-2
- OCLC: 24685933

Leroni of Darkover is an anthology of fantasy and science fiction short stories edited by American writer Marion Zimmer Bradley. The stories are set in Bradley's world of Darkover. The book was first published by DAW Books (No. 865) in November 1991.

== Contents ==
- Introduction by Marion Zimmer Bradley
- "Building" by Lynn Michals
- "The Ferment" by Janet R. Rhodes
- "Wings" by Diana Gill
- "The Rebel" by Deborah J. Mays
- "A Dance for Darkover" by Diana Perry and Vera Nazarian
- "There Is Always Someone" by Jacquie Groom
- "Reunion" by Lawrence Schimel
- "A Way Through the Fog" by Patricia B. Cirone
- "The Gods' Gift" by Mary K. Frey
- "The Speaking Touch" by Margaret L. Carter
- "The Bargain" by Chel Avery
- "The Witch of the Kilghard Hills" by Aimee Kratts
- "The Gift" by Lynne Armstrong-Jones
- "Invitation to Chaos" by Joan Marie Verba
- "The Keeper's Peace" by Patricia Duffy Novak
- "Food for the Worms" by Roxana Pierson
- "Childish Pranks" by Diann S. Partridge
- "Cherilly's Law" by Janni Lee Simner
- "Avarra's Children" by Dorothy J. Heydt
- "The Tower at New Skye" by Priscilla W. Armstrong
- "Homecoming" by Lana Young
- "A Meeting of Minds" by Elisabeth Waters

== Sources ==
- Brown, Charles N.; William G. Contento (2007-11-20). "The Locus Index to Science Fiction (1984-1998)".
- Reginald, Robert (1992). Science Fiction and Fantasy Literature 1975-1991. Detroit: Gale Research. pp. 116. ISBN 0-8103-1825-3.
- Silver, Steven. "DAW Books List". SF Site. Archived from the original on 2004-02-15.
- Leroni of Darkover title listing at the Internet Speculative Fiction Database
