= Sword of Chaos =

1982 anthology edited by Marion Zimmer Bradley

- Cover of the first edition
- Author: Edited by Marion Zimmer Bradley
- Cover artist: Hannah M. G. Shapero
- Language: English
- Series: Darkover
- Genre: Sword and planet
- Publisher: DAW Books
- Publication date: 1982
- Publication place: United States
- Media type: Print (paperback)
- Pages: 240
- ISBN: 0-87997-722-1
- OCLC: 8311149

Sword of Chaos and Other Stories is an anthology of sword and planet short stories edited by Marion Zimmer Bradley. The stories are set in Bradley's fictional world of Darkover. The book was first published by DAW Books in April 1982.

== Contents ==
- Introduction, by Marion Zimmer Bradley
- After Landfall
  - "A Gift of Love" by Diana L. Paxson
- The Cycles of Legend
  - "Dark Lady" by Jane Brae-Bedell
  - "A Legend of the Hellers" by Terry Tafoya
- In the Hundred Kingdoms
  - "In the Throat of the Dragon" by Susan Shwartz
  - "Wind-Music" by Mary Frances Zambreno
  - "Escape" by Leslie Williams
  - "Rebirth" by Elisabeth Waters
  - "A Sword of Chaos" by Marion Zimmer Bradley
- Between the Ages
  - "Di Catenas" by Adrienne Martine-Barnes
  - "Of Two Minds" by Susan Hansen
  - "Through Fire and Frost" by Dorothy J. Heydt
- In the Days of the Comyn
  - "The Way of a Wolf" by Lynne Holdom
  - "Cold Hall" by Aly Parsons
  - "The Lesson of the Inn" by Marion Zimmer Bradley
  - "Confidence" by Phillip Wayne
- The Empire and Beyond
  - "Camilla" by Patricia Mathews
  - "Where the Heart Is" by Millea Kenin
  - "Skeptic" by Lynn Mims
  - "A Recipe for Failure" by Millea Kenin
