= Red Sun of Darkover =

1987 anthology edited by Marion Zimmer Bradley

- Cover of the first edition
- Author: Edited by Marion Zimmer Bradley
- Cover artist: Richard Hescox
- Language: English
- Series: Darkover
- Genre: Fantasy; Science fiction
- Publisher: DAW Books
- Publication date: 1987
- Publication place: United States
- Media type: Print (paperback)
- Pages: 287
- ISBN: 0-88677-230-3
- OCLC: 16976720

Red Sun of Darkover is an anthology of fantasy and science fiction short stories edited by Marion Zimmer Bradley. The stories are set in Bradley's world of Darkover. The book was first published by DAW Books (No. 725) in November 1987.

== Contents ==
- Introduction by Marion Zimmer Bradley
- "A Different Kind of Victory" by Diana L. Paxson
- "The Ballad of Hastur and Cassilda" by Marion Zimmer Bradley
- "Flight" by Nina Boal
- "Salt" by Diann Partridge
- "The Wasteland" by Deborah Wheeler
- "A Cell Opens" by Joe Wilcox
- "The Sum of the Parts" by Dorothy J. Heydt
- "Devil's Advocate" by Patricia Anne Buard
- "Kihar" by Vera Nazarian
- "Playfellow" by Elisabeth Waters
- "Different Path" by P. J. Buchanan
- "The Shadow" by Marion Zimmer Bradley
- "Coils" by Patricia Shaw Mathews
- "The Promise" by Mary Fenoglio
- "The Dare" by Marny Whiteaker

== Sources ==
- Brown, Charles N.; William G. Contento (2007-11-20). "The Locus Index to Science Fiction (1984-1998)".
- Reginald, Robert (1992). Science Fiction and Fantasy Literature 1975-1991. Detroit: Gale Research. pp. 119. ISBN 0-8103-1825-3.
- Silver, Steven. "DAW Books List". SF Site. Archived from the original on 2004-02-15.
- Red Sun of Darkover title listing at the Internet Speculative Fiction Database
