= A Flame in Hali =

2004 novel by Marion Zimmer Bradley and Deborah J. Ross

- Dust-jacket from the first edition
- Author: Marion Zimmer Bradley; Deborah J. Ross
- Cover artist: Romas Kukalis
- Language: English
- Series: Darkover
- Genre: Science fantasy
- Publisher: DAW Books
- Publication date: 2004
- Publication place: United States
- Media type: Print (hardback)
- Pages: 466
- ISBN: 0-7564-0218-2
- OCLC: 55995704
- Dewey Decimal: 813/.54 22
- LC Class: PS3552.R228 F57 2004
- Preceded by: Zandru's Forge, Hawkmistress!
- Followed by: The Heirs of Hammerfell

A Flame in Hali is a science fantasy novel by American writers Marion Zimmer Bradley and Deborah J. Ross, part of the Darkover series. Set in the Hundred Kingdoms time period, this book is also part three of The Clingfire trilogy.

In terms of Darkover's timeline, the book starts about ten years after Zandru's Forge, and is a continuation of that story. References are made throughout to the characters in Two to Conquer, indicating that events of the two books run concurrently.

The book explores issues involving weapons of mass destruction and mutual disarmament treaties, and continues Bradley's themes regarding the ethics of telepathy.

== Plot summary ==
=== Prologue ===
Years prior to the start of the book, the disgraced and forgotten laranzu, Rumail Deslucido, dies in a remote village. In his last moments, he overshadows (takes over the mind of) his son, Eduin, hoping to wreak his final revenge on the Hastur family.

=== Book One ===
Eduin MacEarn, former laranzu of Arilinn, now lives in drunken stupor in the gutters of Thendara. Mentally overshadowed at the death of his deranged laranzu father, all Eduin can hear is a voice in his head demanding that he kill the Hasturs. He is taken in by a mysterious man named Saravio, who once served at Cedestri Tower, but left because of his opposition to The Compact.

Eduin discovers that Saravio has an odd laran talent – the ability to calm the mind of another by singing. This talent breaks one of the most important vows a tower worker takes – not to force his/her mind on another unwillingly. The singing, however, quiets Eduin's internal demons, and he comes to believe he can exploit Saravio's gift to further his vengeance on the Hasturs. He also discovers that Saravio is obsessively devoted to Naotalba, the mythical wife of the god, Zandru.

Using Saravio's gift, Eduin whips up anti-Hastur sentiment among a group of unemployed and homeless men in Thendara.

=== Book Two ===
Leronis Dyannis Ridenow discovers a dangerous matrix operating at the bottom of Hali Lake. She and colleagues from Hali Tower explore the lake and discover the ancient foundations of the original Hali Tower, destroyed in nearly a thousand years earlier in an event known as The Cataclysm. They realize that a distant tower, Cedestri, is drawing power from the remnants of an ancient matrix in the lake to make laran weapons.

Hali Tower asks Dyannis' brother, Varzil, to join them in an effort to shut down Cedestri's activities. As the matrix circle starts its work, Eduin's mob arrives at Hali Lake and attacks. Dyannis summons an illusion in the form of a dragon, panicking the mob and causing injuries. The laranzu'in help as many as they can, but a few are beyond help, and die. Dyannis is consumed with guilt over her actions, though both Varzil and her Keeper acknowledge that she had little choice.

Varzil asks her to accompany him on a trip to persuade Cedestri Tower to join The Compact. As they near their objective, they witness the firebombing of Cedestri Tower by their long-time enemy, Isoldir. Varzil's party renders aid to the survivors, and is able to persuade Cedestri of the necessity of The Compact.

=== Book Three ===
Eduin and Saravio leave Thendara to escape arrest after the riot at Hali Lake.

The mental voice of his father is a growing problem for Eduin, and his dependence on Saravio's singing grows daily. Saravio's increasing use of his gift, however, is causing his own mental deterioration, and he now frequently lapses into multi-day comas. Eduin spurs him on with fake visions of the mythical Naotalba.

Upon arrival in the city of Kirella, they begin representing themselves as brothers, Eduardo Hernandez and Sandoval the Blessed. Eduin weasels his way into the court of Lord Brynon Aillard, whose daughter, Romilla, suffers from severe depression. After a few false starts, they are able to prove that Saravio's gift does indeed lighten Romilla's dark mood. They make an ally of Domna Mhari, the household leronis.

=== Book Four ===
Dyannis Ridenow returns to Hali Tower to take a leave of absence and return to her childhood home of Sweetwater. Her brother, Harald, does not understand his leronis sister, and without asking, arranges a marriage for her. Because of her guilt over the dragon incident (and several other events), she agrees to a marriage that she does not want.

Dyannis realizes her nephew, Lerrys, is suffering from Threshold Sickness, and needs the medical aid of a Tower. She persuades Harald that Lerrys must go to Hali. Once in Thendara, Harald realizes he has made a mistake, and seeks assistance from King Carolin to release Dyannis from her engagement. One of Harald's sisters-in-law is happily substituted for Dyannis and married off to Dom Tiavan Harryl.

Dyannis reveals to Varzil that the death of Felicia Leynier (described in Zandru's Forge) at the hands of Eduin MacEarn may have been her fault. Dyannis tells Varzil that Eduin may have learned of Felicia's true identity from Dyannis' own mind. They both realize that Eduin must have some connection to the old war between King Deslucido and Queen Taniquel Hastur-Acosta, Felicia's mother, but the records are so ambiguous that they are unable to learn anything conclusive.

=== Book Five ===
Lord Brynon Aillard and his party arrive in Valeron, where he must attend to the head of his domain, Queen Julianna of Aillard. She initially identifies Eduin and Saravio as preposterous fakes, but her leronis, Callina Mallory persuades the queen that their gifts are real.

Eduin now sows his seeds of discord, claiming that Varzil the Good, working with Cedestri Tower, intends to attack Valeron. Meanwhile, Saravio suffers an almost complete mental and physical collapse. Eduin uses his abilities in the overworld to shape the mental image of Naotalba in an attempt to gain freedom from his father's mental curse. She demands a death, and Eduin agrees, thinking that she means the Hasturs.

Queen Julianna sends an attack against Hali Tower. Eduin, realizing that Dyannis will likely be killed in the attack (their relationship is detailed in Zandru's Forge), asks Callina to allow him access to Valeron Tower so that he can warn Hali. Callina agrees, but only because she believes it will allow her to free herself from an ancient trap matrix in the tower, trapping Eduin instead. Her plan fails.

Eduin casts himself into the Overworld to warn Hali. With difficulty, he reaches Dyannis, only to discover that the warning is too late – the Tower is being consumed by clingfire. He casts aside his personal demons – both his father and Naotalba – and joins with Dyannis to broadcast to every other tower on Darkover the experience of Hali's death.

=== Epilogue ===
One by one, the other Towers ratify The Compact, swearing neutrality in time of war and banning the making of laran weapons.

== Major characters ==
- Eduin MacEarn (born Eduin Deslucido, and later called Eduardo Hernandez), a disgraced laranzu who has been overshadowed by his equally disgraced father.
- Saravio (later called Sandoval the Blessed and Sandoval Hernandez), a delusional former laranzu of Cedestri, whose laran gift is slowly deranging his mind.
- King Carolin Hastur, ruler of the Hastur domains and one of the two authors of The Compact.
- Varzil the Good (Varzil Ridenow), laranzu of Neskaya, and the other author of The Compact (the only one history will remember).
- Dyannis Ridenow, leronis of Hali, Varzil's sister.

== Publication history ==
- 2004, USA, DAW Books ISBN 0-7564-0218-2, pub date August 2004, hardback
- 2004, USA, Science Fiction Book Club #1170919, pub date October 2004, hardback
- 2005, USA, DAW Books ISBN 0-7564-0267-0, pub date June 2005, paperback

== Sources ==
- Brown, Charles N.; William G. Contento (November 21, 2007). "The Locus Index to Science Fiction: 2004".
