= Zandru's Forge =

2003 novel by Marion Zimmer Bradley and Deborah J. Ross

- Dust-jacket from the first edition
- Author: Marion Zimmer Bradley; Deborah J. Ross
- Cover artist: Romas Kukalis
- Language: English
- Series: Darkover
- Genre: Science fantasy
- Published: 2003 (DAW Books)
- Publication place: United States
- Media type: Print (hardback)
- Pages: 462
- ISBN: 0-7564-0149-6
- OCLC: 52297856
- Dewey Decimal: 813/.54 22
- LC Class: PS3552.R228 Z24 2003
- Preceded by: The Fall of Neskaya
- Followed by: A Flame in Hali, Two to Conquer

Zandru's Forge is a science fantasy novel by American writers Marion Zimmer Bradley and Deborah J. Ross, part of the Darkover series; it is set in The Hundred Kingdoms era, at the end of the Ages of Chaos. This book is also part two of The Clingfire trilogy.

The events in this book start about 20 years after the end of The Fall of Neskaya. Chapters 35 and 46–50 overlap with Hawkmistress!. The end of the book describes Varzil Ridenow being appointed Keeper of Neskaya, so the book takes place before Two to Conquer.

== Plot summary ==
=== Prologue ===
Rumail Deslucido, a bitter, corrupt and defeated laranzu, tells his twisted story to his only son, Eduin MacEarn (from The Fall of Neskaya). He has sent each of his sons to kill the Hasturs, and each has died in the attempt. Now it is Eduin's turn. He charges Eduin with the duty to enter Arilinn Tower and befriend all, but to secretly kill any Hasturs he can.

=== Book One ===
Varzil Ridenow presents himself for admission to Arilinn Tower, but is turned away because he does not have his father's permission. Though his father, Dom Felix, is initially furious, events work in Varzil's favor and his father eventually relents.

At Arilinn, Varzil meets and befriends Carolin (Carolin) Hastur, heir to the Hastur throne, and Eduin MacEarn, a prickly but talented individual.

At midwinter, Carolin returns to court. Eduin and Varzil accompany him, meeting many of Carolin's extended family. Varzil becomes aware of the Byzantine nature of court politics.

Carolin, Varzil, and Orain ride to Lake Hali. When Varzil attempts to wade in the cloud-lake, he perceives a matrix circle working with a large artificial matrix alive with non-human energy. He realizes that he is seeing a circle operating in the distant past and concludes that he is seeing the destruction of Hail Tower by Aldaran. Carolin drags his friend out of Hali Lake and takes him to the current Hali Tower for medical treatment.

Varzil and Eduin accompany Carolin to Comyn Castle for the Midwinter Ball. Carolin experiences a seizure, which Varzil believes (but cannot prove) was caused by Eduin.

On a ride to Blue Lake, Carolin and Varzil discuss the idea of a pact among all of the Hundred Kingdoms and the Towers, banning laran weapons. Varzil averts an attack on Carolin with a trap matrix weapon.

Varzil and Eduin return to the Tower, while Carolin marries the timid woman whom his relatives have selected for him.

=== Book Two ===
Felicia Leynier of Nevarsin Tower arrives at Arilinn Tower. Varzil learns that she is the only surviving child of Coryn Leynier and Queen Taniquel Hastur-Acosta (from The Fall of Neskaya), but is sworn to secrecy.

Eduin receives word that his father is ill and travels into the back country of the Hellers. While attempting to heal his father's lung ailment, Eduin is overshadowed by his father's vengeful personality.

Back at Arilinn, Varzil joins a circle charged with making clingfire. When Austur, the keeper has a stroke, Felicia Leynier prevents a toxic chemical spill by acting as a temporary keeper. Her actions dispel the old myth that women cannot be keepers. With Varzil's encouragement, Felicia requests to be trained as a keeper. Ultimately, Hestral Tower asks for Felicia, offering to train her as a keeper. That evening, Austur has another stroke. On the point of death, he names Varzil as his replacement and swears him to independence from the Comyn aristocracy.

At Arilinn, the tower workers undertake the Year's End ritual (as seen in The Forbidden Tower), in order to clear the laran channels. Varzil and Felicia make love. The next days, she gives him a ring, formerly belonging to her mother, set with an unkeyed matrix stone.

While studying in the archives of Hali Tower, Eduin accidentally learns of Felicia Leynier's true identity. He requests to transfer to Hestral Tower.

=== Book Three ===
Carolin, carrying out a promise he has made on his wife's deathbed, takes his two young sons to St. Valentine of the Snows monastery for education. He receives word from Hali Tower that his uncle, King Felix, has died. Carolin is now king, and vows that his first action will be enacting a ban on laran-based weapons. On his journey back to Thendara, Carolin learns from Orain that his ruthless uncle Rakhal has seized the throne. Orain swears fealty to Carolin, and they gather forces for a fight with Rakhal and his general, Lyondri.

Eduin, now in Hestral Tower, sets a trap matrix for Felicia Leynier. In Arilinn, Varzil perceives that something has happened to her, and arranges for Arilinn Tower to teleport him through the matrix screens to Hestral. He finds Felicia barely alive. She dies a month later.

Loryn Ardais, the Keeper of Hestral, asks for Varzil's assistance in destroying a supply of laran weapons to keep them out of the hands of Rakhal and Lyondri. They hear through the relays Carolin has pledged to abjure the use of laran weapons, especially clingfire, and that Tramontana Tower has signed on to the pact.

Varzil studies the matrix lattice responsible for Felicia's injuries and discovers a trap matrix, similar to the one that had almost killed Carolin. He demands truthspell be set to uncover the individual responsible for causing her death. Eduin, who has inherited his father's ability to foil truthspell, is able to pass Varzil's questioning.

King Rakhal's men arrive demanding clingfire. Keeper Loryn tells them that Hestur Tower will, like Tramontana, make no laran weapons. Rakhal's army returns to attack the tower. Eduin, in frustration, admits that he wants to fight the Hasturs, not merely hold off their attack. The army sets fire to the surrounding village, but the tower produces three days of rain. Eduin constitutes his own circle which repels the army, but nearly kills him in the process. He recovers sufficiently to escape the tower.

Hali Tower attacks Hestral Tower. Telepathically, Felicia urges Varzil to pass through the Overworld and end Hali's attack. Varzil attempts to persuade Hali's Keeper, Dougal diAsturian. When words fail, he shows diAsturian his vision from Hali Lake – The Cataclysm. The experience causes diAsturian joins the pact.

=== Book Four ===
Carolin and his forces confront Rakhal's army, and have several victories. Rakhal and Lyondri's men increasingly desert to Carolin's side. Eventually they are defeated. Rakhal, saying that if he cannot be king, neither can Carolin, tries to kill Carolin in a sword fight, but is killed. A different viewpoint of this same battle appears in the book "Hawkmistress!" where it is told from a different viewpoint - that of Romilly MacAran who looks after the sentry birds and who is also responsible for Orain's rescue from Lyondri.

=== Epilogue ===
At Thendara, Carolin and Varzil meet and determine to carry the Compact to every kingdom in Darkover.

== Characters ==
- Carolin Hastur, nephew and heir to the King Felix.
- Varzil Ridenow (also known as Varzil the Good), younger son of Dom Felix Ridenow, powerful laranzu.
- Rahkal Hastur, Carolin's cousin and usurper of the throne.
- Eduin MacEarn, youngest son of Rumail Deslucido.
- Felicia Leynier, sole child of Taniquel Hastur-Acosta and Coryn Leynier, leronis, trains to be a female keeper.
- Austur Syrtis, Keeper of Arilinn.
- Loryn Ardais, Keeper of Hester.

== Publication history ==
- 2003, USA, DAW Books ISBN 0-7564-0149-6, pub date June 2003, hardback
- 2003, USA, Science Fiction Book Club #58200, pub date July 2003, hardcover
- 2004, USA, DAW Books ISBN 0-7564-0184-4, pub date June 2004, paperback

== Sources ==
- Brown, Charles N.; Contento, William G. (November 21, 2007). "The Locus Index to Science Fiction: 2003".
