= Thendara House =

1983 novel by Marion Zimmer Bradley

- Cover of the first edition
- Author: Marion Zimmer Bradley
- Cover artist: Hannah M. G. Shapero
- Language: English
- Series: Darkover
- Genre: Science fantasy
- Publisher: DAW Books
- Publication date: 1983
- Publication place: United States
- Media type: Print (paperback)
- Pages: 414
- ISBN: 0-87997-857-0
- OCLC: 9865395
- Preceded by: The Forbidden Tower
- Followed by: City of Sorcery

Thendara House is a science fantasy novel by American writer Marion Zimmer Bradley, part of her Darkover series and a sequel to The Shattered Chain. It was originally published by DAW Books (No. 544) in 1983. The book was co-written by Jacqueline Lichtenberg, without credit.

The title refers to the Thendera Guildhouse of Renunciates, a religio-military sisterhood whose members live independently from Darkover's rigid patriarchal society.

In terms of the Darkover timeline, the events of Thendera House take place three or four years after The Spell Sword and about two years after the events of The Forbidden Tower.

== Plot summary ==
=== Part One: Conflicting Oaths ===
Magda Lorne tenders her resignation from Terran service to her supervisor, Cholayna Ares, saying that she has taken an oath to spend six months in the Guildhouse of the Renuniciates at Thendera. Cholayna tries to talk her out of resigning, and Magda agrees to detached duty.

Jaelle n'ha Melora starts her first day of working in the spaceport, but finds conforming to Terran customs a challenge. She quickly discovers that her new husband, Peter Haldane, despite being raised on Darkover, has typically Terran sexist attitudes towards women. Jaelle is asked by the legate, Russell Montray, if she can help one of his agents pass as a native.

Magda meets with Mother Lauria at the guildhouse and learns the rules under which she will be living for the next six months. An injured woman named Keitha knocks at the door and asks to take the oath, which will grant her refuge from her husband and family. Several days later, Magda, Doria and Keitha undergo a consciousness-raising session with her future sisters regarding her motives for joining the Renunciates. She experiences a vision of the Goddess Avarra.

Jaelle meets with Kadarin, a Terran operative, to assist him in prepping for a trip to the Dry Towns. She is assigned to give Alessandro Li a lesson in Darkover's history, but comes to distrust his motives, telling her husband that he wants to reduce Darkover to a Terran colony. Peter, ever ambitious, ignores her. Jaelle realizes that Peter does not consider her an equal partner in the marriage, and that, in many respects, she has broken her Renunciate oath by marrying him.

In the Guildhouse, Bryna gives birth to a boy; since no male may stay in the guildhouse, he is adopted out to a male relative. Camilla tells Magda the story of how she came to be a Renunciate. Keitha's abusive husband arrives with two mercenaries, demanding the return of his wife. When the Renunciates refuse, a fight ensues. Magda kills one of the mercenaries and comes close to killing the second before Camilla stops her; Magda's failure to follow Darkovan codes of conduct have indebted the Guildhouse to pay steep damages for her mistakes. Magda continues to struggle with the expectations of her Renunciate sisters.

=== Part Two: Sundering ===
Cholayna asks Jaelle to intercede with the Guildhouse to allow some of the Reuniciates to work in the spaceport. After a private meeting with Mother Lauria, Jaelle joins the house meeting, which is a combination disciplinary hearing and consciousness-raising session. Afterwards, Jaelle mentions one guild member who is away on Sisterhood business, explaining that this organization is a remnant of one of the original groups that founded the Renunciates.

A diplomatic function is arranged between Danvan Hastur and a group of Terran officials. Russell Montray and Alessandro Li manage to offend their Darkovan hosts over the issue of airspace and local control. Lorill Hastur and Rohana Ardais arrive, and Rohana asks to speak privately with Jaelle. Rohana notes that Jaelle is pregnant with a daughter, and that this daughter will be the heir to the Aillard domain, which passes through female hands. She explains that Jaelle has no choice; it is the law of the Comyn.

A fire breaks out on Alton lands. A number of Renunciates volunteer to help fight the fire, including Magda. They meet Damon Ridenow, Regent of Alton, and Andrew Carr, a Terran married to Ridenow's sister-in-law (from The Forbidden Tower). Carr recognizes Magda as an Intelligence operative, but does not give her away. Magda realizes that Ridenow and Carr treat those around them as equals, unlike the other Comyn nobility she has met. Eventually her burns are healed by Hilary Castamir-Sytris (from Marion Zimmer Bradley's Darkover).

=== Part Three: Outgrowth ===
Russell Montray and Alessandro Li become obsessed with meeting Andrew Carr, now called An’ndra Lanart. Despite Magda, Peter and others explaining the breach of etiquette this could cause, they are insistent. Magda realizes that Carr must be warned. As Carr is leaving, Montray makes a scene, betraying his incompetence. Magda resigns, in part because she realizes her skills will never be fully valued because she is female.

Jaelle tells Peter that their marriage was a mistake, that she wants to divorce. When he cannot persuade her to change her mind, he hurls insults at her. Their discussion is interrupted by a loudspeaker page. Lady Rohana has come to the Terran zone to confront Jaelle about her duties to the Aillard Domain.

As she decides to leave the Terran zone entirely, Jaelle learns that Alessandro Li has undertaken a journey to the Kilghard Hills without an escort. She determines to follow him, but Peter threatens to have the Terran authorities lock her up on the grounds that she is pregnant. Frightened, she throws him to the floor, and leaves believing that she has killed him.

Jaelle rides into the Kilghard Hills after Li. In the storm, kireseth pollen is disturbed, giving Jaelle a vision of her daughter, Cleindori, in red Keeper's robes. She hears Magda's voice encouraging her, but believes her to be another vision. Eventually the two women find shelter in a cave, and Jaelle realizes that Magda has come after her, because of her own premonition of Jaelle's death.

Jaelle and Magda ponder their failures – as married women, as Renunciates. Jaelle realizes that she doesn't really want Peter's baby. Several days later, she miscarries.

Magda hallucinates a mystical conversation that she does not fully understand. Later she perceives telepathic contact with Andrew Carr. Shortly thereafter, they are rescued.

Alessandro Li is also rescued and persuaded to advocate for the removal of Russell Montray, in favor of a competent legate. He agrees to make no trouble for Carr. Inquires are made about Peter Haldane; Jaelle did not kill him. Li agrees to arrange her divorce.

Magda has another hallucination of mystical voices, who identify themselves as the Dark Sisterhood, working for the long-term survival of Darkover. She also foresees that Jaelle will become pregnant by Damon Ridenow and give birth to Cleindori Aillard.

== Characters ==
- Magdalen (Magda) Lorne (aka Margali n'ha Ysabet)
- Jaelle Aillard Haldane (aka Jaelle n'ha Melora)
- Cholayna Ares, Magda's Terran supervisor
- Peter Haldane, ex-husband of Magda Lorne, husband of Jaelle n'ha Melora
- Alessandro Li (aka Aleki), a Terran operative
- Russell Montray, an incompetent Terran official and father of Wade Montray (from Star of Danger)
- Mother Lauria n'ha Andrea, head of Thendara Guildhouse
- Camilla n'ha Kyria, a Renunciate
- Rafaella n'ha Doria, a Renunciate and Jaelle's business partner

== Inconsistencies with other books in the series ==
- Valdir Lanart-Alton is referred to several times as Lord Armida. In every other Darkover book, Armida is the Alton estate, but not any part of a title.

== Awards and nominations ==
- 1984, Prometheus Award finalist
