= Free Amazons of Darkover =

1985 book by Marion Zimmer Bradley

- Cover of the first edition
- Author: Edited by Marion Zimmer Bradley
- Cover artist: Richard Hescox
- Language: English
- Series: Darkover
- Genre: Fantasy; Science fiction
- Publisher: DAW Books
- Publication date: 1985
- Publication place: United States
- Media type: Print (paperback)
- Pages: 304
- ISBN: 0-87997-722-1
- OCLC: 8311149

Free Amazons of Darkover is an anthology of fantasy and science fiction short stories edited by Marion Zimmer Bradley. The stories are set in Bradley's world of Darkover. The book was first published by DAW Books (No. 657) in December 1985.

== Contents ==
- Introduction: About Amazons by Marion Zimmer Bradley
- "The Oath of the Free Amazons" by Walter Breen
- "The Legend of Lady Bruna" by Marion Zimmer Bradley
- "Cast Off Your Chains" by Margaret Silvestri
- "The Banshee" by Sherry Kramer
- "On the Trail" by Barbara Armistead
- "To Open a Door" by P. Alexandra Riggs
- "The Meeting" by Nina Boal
- "The Mother Quest" by Diana L. Paxson
- "Child of the Heart" by Elisabeth Waters
- "Midwife" by Deborah Wheeler
- "Recruits" by Maureen Shannon
- "A Different Kind of Courage" by Mercedes Lackey
- "Knives" by Marion Zimmer Bradley
- "Tactics" by Jane M. H. Bigelow
- "This One Time" by Joan Marie Verba
- "Her Own Blood" by Margaret L. Carter
- "The Camel's Nose" by Susan Holtzer
- "Girls Will Be Girls" by Patricia Shaw-Mathews
- "Growing Pains" by Susan M. Shwartz
- "Oath of the Free Amazons: Terran, Techno Period" by Jaida n'ha Sandra
