= The Door Through Space =

1961 novel by Marion Zimmer Bradley

- Cover of the first edition
- Author: Marion Zimmer Bradley
- Language: English
- Series: Darkover
- Genre: Science fiction
- Publisher: Ace Books
- Publication date: 1961
- Publication place: United States
- Media type: Print (paperback)
- Pages: 132
- OCLC: 1741054

The Door Through Space is a 1961 science fiction novel by American writer Marion Zimmer Bradley. An expansion of Bradley's story "Bird of Prey", which first appeared in the May 1957 issue of the magazine Venture, it is her first novel, and was published by Ace Books, bound tête-bêche with Rendezvous on a Lost World by A. Bertram Chandler.

Although it is not part of her Darkover book series, Darkover is mentioned (as another planet) in passing in the book; numerous Darkover elements appear in the book, such as a red sun, Dry Towns with chained women, catmen and other nonhumans, Terran Empire trade cities, and a Ghost Wind.

== Plot introduction ==
The novel concerns an intelligence agent and a blood feud in the Dry Towns in the north of a world called Wolf. The text of the Ace Double printing differs in the last chapter from the text of the 1979 Ace stand-alone printing.

== Publication history ==
- 1961, US, Ace Books OCLC 1741054, pub date May 1961, paperback, Tête-bêche with Rendezvous on a Lost World by A. Bertram Chandler
- 1979, UK, Arrow Books ISBN 0-09-921170-X, pub date 1979, paperback
