= Towers of Darkover =

1993 anthology edited by Marion Zimmer Bradley

- Cover of the first edition
- Editor: Marion Zimmer Bradley
- Cover artist: Richard Hescox
- Language: English
- Series: Darkover
- Genre: Fantasy; Science fiction
- Publisher: DAW Books
- Publication date: 1993
- Publication place: United States
- Media type: Print (paperback)
- Pages: 336
- ISBN: 0-88677-553-1
- OCLC: 28406201

Towers of Darkover is an anthology of fantasy and science fiction short stories edited by American writer Marion Zimmer Bradley. The stories are set in Bradley's world of Darkover. The book was first published by DAW Books (No. 919) in July 1993.

== Contents ==
- Editorial by Marion Zimmer Bradley
- "Love of the Banshee" by Lynne Armstrong-Jones
- "The Wind Man" by Dorothy J. Heydt
- "Shelter" by Nina Boal
- "Carmen's Flight" by Margaret L. & Leslie R. Carter
- "Ten Minutes or So" by Marion Zimmer Bradley
- "Victory's Cost" by Patricia B. Cirone
- "Kefan McIlroy Is Snared" by Aletha Biedermann-Wiens
- "Rosa the Washerwoman" by Mary Ellen Fletcher
- "Like a Moth to the Flame" by Emily Alward
- "A Change of View" by Judith Kobylecky
- "Choices" by Lynn Michals
- "A Lesser Life" by Patricia Duffy Novak
- "Summer Storms" by Glenn Sixbury
- "Conscience" by Alexandra Sarris
- "Shame" by Charley Pearson
- "The Frontier" by Diana L. Paxson
- "The Aillard Anomaly" by Diann Partridge
- "Destined for the Tower" by Elisabeth Waters and Deborah Wheeler
- "The Madwoman of the Kilghard Hills" by Joan Marie Verba
- "I'm a Big Cat Now" by David R. Heydt
