= The Heirs of Hammerfell =

1989 novel by Marion Zimmer Bradley

- Author: Marion Zimmer Bradley
- Cover artist: Richard Hescox
- Language: English
- Series: Darkover
- Genre: Science fantasy
- Publisher: DAW Books
- Publication date: 1989
- Publication place: United States
- Media type: Print (hardcover)
- Pages: 300
- ISBN: 0886773954
- Preceded by: A Flame in Hali, Two to Conquer
- Followed by: Rediscovery

The Heirs of Hammerfell is a science fantasy novel by American writer Marion Zimmer Bradley, part of her Darkover series. It was first published by in hardcover by DAW Books in 1989. The book takes place during the era of Darkover's history known as the Hundred Kingdoms. This is the last book in the Darkover series written entirely by Bradley without the assistance of a co-author.

== Plot summary ==
For many years, the houses of Hammerfell and Storn have been locked in perpetual conflict. Having lost his son and heir in a battle with the men of Storn, Rascard, Duke of Hammerfell, marries the much younger Erminie Leynier.

The couple's union produces two sons, Alastair, the heir to Hammerfell, and his twin, Conn. When the children are about 18 months old, Storn attacks with clingfire. Erminie escapes with Alastair and her dog Jewel, while a servant, Markos, who is carrying Conn, is separated from her in the confusion.

Eighteen years later, finds Erminie as Second Technician at Thendara. Her colleague at Thendara, Valentine Hastur, asks for Erminie's hand in marriage, but she puts him off. At a social event, Alastair meets his cousin, Floria Elhalyn, whom he has not seen since he was a child. He is introduced to King Hastur, who indicates that he will support Alastair's claim to Hammerfell, if Alastair will not pledge allegiance to Aldaran.

In the remote mountains, Markos has raised Conn. He is living a Robin Hood-like existence, supporting the causes of the common folk who have been abused by Lord Storn. He presents himself to Valentine Hastur, who initially mistakes him for Alastair. Hastur arranges to reunite the family. Like Hastur, Conn finds little of worth about his brother. Alastair insists on riding to the mountains and leading a small army against Storn.

A fire breaks out on the Storn lands, and somewhat against his will, Alastair joins the fire brigade. He realizes that he is attracted to Lenisa of Storn, the granddaughter of Lord Storn, despite being more or less engaged to Floria Elhalyn. While fighting the fire, Alastair is injured. Conn perceives this through the laran connection to his brother. A party sets out for the mountains.

Alastair is taken to Storn Castle to recover from his burns. Lord Storn expresses a desire to see ended the feud between Storn and Hammerfell. Lord Storn tells Alastair that the land is played out, only good for pasturing sheep, but discovers that his soldiers have been burning out his tenants, rather than gently persuading them to leave. He explains to Conn what he has previously explained to Alastair, and suggests that the time for feuding is over. It is determined that Alastair will marry Lenisa of Storn, and Conn will marry Floria Elhayln. Erminie agrees to marry Valentine Hastur.

== Characters ==
- Alastair of Hammerfell, the elder twin
- Conn of Hammerfell, the younger twin
- Rascard, Duke of Hammerfell
- Erminie Leynier, the Duke's second wife; later Second Technician at Thendera.
- Valentine Hastur, a tower technician and friend of Erminie's.
- Ardrin of Storn, Lord of Storn
- Lenisa of Storn, the granddaughter of Lord Storn

== Publication history ==
- 1989, USA, DAW Books, 0-88677-395-4, hardcover
- 1990, USA, DAW Books, 0-88677-451-9, paperback
- 1991, UK, Legend Books, 0-09-982740-9, paperback
- 2013, USA, Marion Zimmer Bradley Literary Works Trust, 978-1-938185-27-4, paperback
