= Darkover (board game) =

Board game

Cover art by Hannah M. G. Shapero

Darkover, subtitled "The Ages of Chaos", is a board game published by Eon Products in 1979 that is based on the Darkover novels by Marion Zimmer Bradley.

== Description ==
Darkover is a game for 2–4 players in which players need to take and maintain hold of the Elhalyn Tower, with the use of armies as well as psychic powers. Reviewers noted that although this is ostensibly a board wargame, it contains many elements of a party game.

=== Components ===
The game box includes:

- 8-page rulebook
- 10" x 18" board divided into a number of regions with towers and castles.
- four 3-piece matrix screens
- four sets of 15 clan tokens numbered 1 to 10 (odd numbers are duplicated)
- 24 Power discs (eight each of three designs)
- 36 Peril chips
- One Monitor
- One Crown

=== Setup ===
All players write a dare; these are placed in a cup. Tokens are randomly placed on the board. One player is selected as Monitor, and one is the Crown holder.

=== Gameplay ===
Each turn starts with collection of power. Each player fills their Power disc allotment to three, then draws their choice of two peril chips or two clan tokens. Players may receive extra tokens if they own the Crown or castles. Players conquer regions and gain control of towers with special powers by using their clan tokens and other powers. Combat is resolved by Rock paper scissors. If both players choose "Rock", then they enter a chanting duel. Both players must chant something for 30 seconds; the first player to show emotion or look away is the loser.

The Monitor can punish a player who displays negative emotions by removing one of the player's clan tokens. The punished player then becomes the new Monitor.

=== Victory conditions ===
A player wins by taking control of the central Elhalyn Tower with four clan tokens for an entire turn.

== Publication history ==
In 1958, Marion Zimmer Bradley wrote The Planet Savers, the first novel in a series of books about the world of Darkover that would eventually number more than 30 by the time of Bradley's death. The board game Darkover was a licensed creation designed by Bill Eberle, Jack Kittredge, and Peter Olotka, and was published in 1979 by the company the trio founded, Eon Products.

== Reception ==
John Olsen reviewed Darkover for White Dwarf #18, giving it an overall rating of 9 out of 10, and stated that "Darkover is an excellent game and I recommend it whole-heartedly to everyone. I look forward to any future release from Eon Products".

In issue #34 of The Space Gamer, Bob Von Gruenigen found the game light but enjoyable: "Darkover is a good party game, better with four players than two. Its physical quality is impressive. If you enjoyed the Darkover novels, or if you enjoy unusual games, Darkover will be a worthwhile investment".

Games included Darkover in their "Top 100 Games of 1982", calling it a "bizarre game" but noting that it "requires strategic insight, self-control (players displaying anger, greed, or despair are penalized), and a distinct lack of inhibitions".
