= The Other Side of the Mirror (anthology) =

Anthology edited by Marion Zimmer Bradley

- Cover of the first edition
- Editor: Marion Zimmer Bradley
- Cover artist: Richard Hescox
- Language: English
- Series: Darkover
- Genre: Fantasy; Science fiction
- Publisher: DAW Books
- Publication date: 1987
- Publication place: United States
- Media type: Print (paperback)
- Pages: 303
- ISBN: 0-88677-185-4
- OCLC: 15094250

The Other Side of the Mirror and Other Darkover Stories is an anthology of fantasy and science fiction short stories edited by American writer Marion Zimmer Bradley. The stories are set in Bradley's world of Darkover. The book was first published by DAW Books (No. 698) in February 1987.

== Contents ==
- Introduction by Marion Zimmer Bradley
- "The Other Side of the Mirror" by Patricia Floss
- "Bride Price" by Marion Zimmer Bradley
- "Everything but Freedom" by Marion Zimmer Bradley
- "Oathbreaker" by Marion Zimmer Bradley
- "Blood Hunt" by Linda Frankel & Paula Crunk

== Sources ==
- Brown, Charles N.; William G. Contento (2007-11-20). "The Locus Index to Science Fiction (1984–1998)".
- Jaffery, Sheldon (1987). Future and Fantastic Worlds. Mercer Island, Washington: Starmont House. pp. 238–239. ISBN 1-55742-002-5.
- The Other Side of the Mirror title listing at the Internet Speculative Fiction Database
