= Snows of Darkover =

1994 anthology edited by Marion Zimmer Bradley

- Cover of the first edition
- Editor: Marion Zimmer Bradley
- Cover artist: Tim White
- Language: English
- Series: Darkover
- Genre: Fantasy; Science fiction
- Publisher: DAW Books
- Publication date: 1994
- Publication place: United States
- Media type: Print (paperback)
- Pages: 336
- ISBN: 0-88677-601-5
- OCLC: 30019209

Snows of Darkover (Darkover Anthology #12) is an anthology of fantasy and science fiction short stories edited by American writer Marion Zimmer Bradley. The stories are set in Bradley's world of Darkover. The book was first published by DAW Books (No. 949) in April 1994.

== Contents ==
- Introduction by Marion Zimmer Bradley
- "The Yearbride" by Lee Martindale
- "Cradle of Lies" by Deborah Wheeler
- "Power" by Lynne Armstrong-Jones
- "Upholding Tradition" by Chel Avery
- "The Place Between" by Diana L. Paxson
- "Kadarin Tears" by Patricia Duffy Novak
- "The Awakening" by Roxana Pierson
- "Safe Passage" by Joan Marie Verba
- "Garron's Gift" by Janet R. Rhodes
- "The Chieri's Godchild" by Cynthia McQuillin
- "Fire in the Hellers" by Patricia Shaw Mathews
- "A Matter of Perception" by Lena Gore
- "Poetic License" by Mercedes Lackey
- "The Midwinter's Gifts" by Jane Edgeworth
- "The MacAran Legacy" by Toni Berry
- "The Word of a Hastur" by Marion Zimmer Bradley
- "Matrix Blue" by C. Frances
- "Shards" by Nina Boal
- "Briana's Birthright" by Suzanne Hawkins Burke
- "In the Eye of the Beholder" by Linda Anfuso
- "Transformati" by Alexandra Sarris
- "Amends" by Glenn R. Sixbury
- "A Capella" by Elisabeth Waters
