= The Keeper's Price =

1980 anthology edited by Marion Zimmer Bradley

- Cover of the first edition
- Editor: Marion Zimmer Bradley
- Cover artist: Don Maitz
- Language: English
- Series: Darkover
- Genre: Fantasy; Science fiction
- Publisher: DAW Books
- Publication date: 1980
- Publication place: United States
- Media type: Print (paperback)
- Pages: 207
- ISBN: 0-87997-517-2
- OCLC: 6000070

The Keeper's Price and Other Stories is an anthology of fantasy and science fiction short stories edited by Marion Zimmer Bradley. The stories are set in Bradley's world of Darkover. The book was first published by DAW Books in February 1980. Many of the stories first appeared in the magazine Starstone.

== Contents ==
- Introduction: "A Word from the Creator of Darkover" by Marion Zimmer Bradley
1. The Settlement
  - "Vai Dom" by Diana L. Paxson
  - "The Forest" by Cynthia McQuillin
2. The Ages of Chaos
  - "There Is Always an Alternative" by Patricia Mathews
  - "The Tale of the Durraman’s Donkey" by Eileen Ledbetter
  - "The Fires of Her Vengeance" by Susan M. Shwartz
  - "Circle of Light" by Kathleen Williams
  - "The Alton Gift" by Elisabeth Waters
  - "The Answer" by Jacqueline Lichtenberg & Jean Lorrah
3. Under the Comyn
  - "The Rescue" by Linda MacKendrick
  - "The Keeper's Price" by Marion Zimmer Bradley & Elisabeth Waters
  - "The Hawk-Master's Son" by Marion Zimmer Bradley
  - "A Simple Dream" by Penny Ziegler
  - "Paloma Blanca" by Patricia Mathews
  - "Blood Will Tell" by Marion Zimmer Bradley
4. After the Fall of the Comyn
  - "Ambassador to Corresanti" by Linda Frankel
  - "A View from the Reconstruction" by Paula Crunk

== Sources ==
- Contento, William G. (2008-01-26). "Index to Science Fiction Anthologies and Collections, Combined Edition". Archived from the original on 2011-06-27.
- Jaffery, Sheldon (1987). Future and Fantastic Worlds. Mercer Island, Washington: Starmont House. pp. 129–130. ISBN 1-55742-002-5.
- The Keeper's Price title listing at the Internet Speculative Fiction Database
