= Darkover Landfall =

1972 novel by Marion Zimmer Bradley

- Cover of the first edition
- Author: Marion Zimmer Bradley
- Cover artist: Jack Gaughan
- Language: English
- Series: Darkover
- Genre: Science fiction
- Publisher: DAW Books
- Publication date: 1972
- Publication place: United States
- Media type: Print (paperback)
- Pages: 160
- OCLC: 715454
- Preceded by: Chronologically first in the series
- Followed by: Arilinn

Darkover Landfall is a science fiction novel in the Darkover series by American writer Marion Zimmer Bradley. It was originally published in 1972 by DAW Books. It has since been republished several times and is included as part of the Darkover: First Contact omnibus. According to Bradley's obituary, the events of this book take place at the end of the 21st century.

== Plot summary ==
Darkover Landfall concerns the crew and colonists of a spaceship that is forced to crash land on Cottman IV, an inhospitable planet in orbit around a red giant. The crew become accidental colonists when the ship loses contact with Earth and they realize rescue is impossible. The book introduces surnames, religious and cultural themes that echo throughout the Darkover series of books. This series spans millennia, as the ship's descendants populate the world and develop unique cultures and psi abilities. Though Darkover Landfall is not the first book written in the series, in the Darkover timeline its events are the beginning for all that follows.

== Reception ==
Of this book, J. John Jones, writing for Amazing Stories, notes that

Landfall has been a disappointment for some women. I've read reviews by some feminist critics who have vilified the work, expecting something more radical, apparently, from a woman writer. I still find her ideas provocative. No doubt some women are offended by the roles of planned breeding that her women characters portrayed. Still, stimulating rage is one way to effect social change so you might suppose that her works still gave some impetus for social change even with the roles that her women characters portray in this imagined society.

== Major characters ==
- Captain Harry Leicester
- Rafael MacAran, one of the ship's officers
- Camilla Del Rey, one of the ship's officers
- Ewen Ross, medical officer
- Judith Lovat, biologist
- Father Valentine, order of St. Christopher of Centaurus

== Sources ==
- Brown, Charles N.; William G. Contento (November 20, 2007). "The Locus Index to Science Fiction (1984-1998)".
- Jaffery, Sheldon (1987). Future and Fantastic Worlds. Mercer Island, Washington: Starmont House. p. 13. ISBN 1-55742-002-5.
