= Two to Conquer =

1980 novel by Marion Zimmer Bradley

Two To Conquer
- Cover of the first edition
- Author: Marion Zimmer Bradley
- Cover artist: John Pound
- Language: English
- Series: Darkover
- Genre: Science fantasy
- Publisher: DAW Books
- Publication date: 1980
- Publication place: United States
- Media type: Print (paperback)
- Pages: 335
- ISBN: 0-87997-540-7
- OCLC: 6354637
- LC Class: CPB Box no. 1582 vol. 4
- Preceded by: Zandru's Forge, Hawkmistress!
- Followed by: The Heirs of Hammerfell

Two To Conquer is a science fantasy novel by American writer Marion Zimmer Bradley; it is part of the Darkover series, set at the end of Ages of Chaos, in the period of Darkover's history known as the Hundred Kingdoms. The book's introduction places it two hundred years after the events in the book entitled Stormqueen!.

The book includes several key events in the Darkover chronology, including the creation of The Compact by Varzil the Good, the destruction of Hali Tower, and the beginnings of merger between the priestesses of Avarra and the warriors of the Sisterhood of the Sword. The events of this book overlap with Book VI of Zandru's Forge.

== Plot summary ==
Prologue: The Alien

Paul Harrell, a Terran convict, finds that he has been teleported to an unfamiliar world called Darkover by an aggressive warlord named Bard di Asturien.

Book One: The Foster Brothers

In Castle Asturias, Carlina Asturien prepares for her handfasting ceremony. She tells her nurse that she would rather be a priestess of Avarra, serving the poor and sick. Instead, she is handfasted to Bard di Asturien, for political reasons, though the official wedding is planned for more than a year later. Bard's character – hot tempered, self-centered, misogynist, lacking in empathy – is revealed.

At the midwinter night festival, Bard gets drunk and tries to force himself on Carlina. Geremy Hastur intervenes, and Bard stabs him with a poisoned Dry Towner dagger that he claimed from the battlefield. Hastur survives, but is lamed for life. Bard is judged guilty and sent into exile for seven years.

Bard returns to his father's home to say goodbye before he goes into exile as a mercenary. He meets Melisendra MacAran, who is fostered with his father's family. He uses his laran to force himself on her, but blames Carlina for his actions. As Bard leaves the territory, Beltran and Geremy confront him, and Bard kills Beltran in a sword fight.

Book Two: The Kilghard Wolf

Six years later, Bard, now called Bard mac Fianna or the Wolf, is a mercenary in Scaravel. He learns that King Adrin has died, and that his widow has returned with her infant son to her own kin. Geremy Hastur now claims the right to hold Castle Asturias and its lands. Bard's father, Rafael, asks Bard to return and support his claim to Asturias. He also learns that Melisendra has borne him a son, Erlend.

Bard arrives at his father's home. The following day, Geremy Hastur's envoy arrives to request a truce so their armies may join to repel an attack from Serrais. The truce is accepted. Bard marches his small army towards Castle Asturias, only to discover that the army of Serrais stands in his way. In battle, Serrais is defeated. Bard meets with Geremy and demands to know Carlina's whereabouts, indicating that he continues to view her as his wife. He fails to retrieve her from the Island of Silence, where she has joined the priestesses of Avarra.

At the wedding of Geremy Hastur and Ginevra Harryl, Bard learns that many of the Towers are now sworn to neutrality, following the example of Varzil Ridenow, Keeper of Neskaya. Varzil arrives to return Alaric di Asturien, Bard's brother, to Castle Asturias. Varzil asks Rafael di Asturien to sign on to The Compact, which forbids the use of laran weapons. Varzil also hints that the era of hundreds of autonomous kingdoms must come to an end if Darkover wants peace. In the end, Rafael di Asturien and Bard clearly oppose it.

Book Three: The Dark Twin

Rafael di Asturien uses his own laran training to teleport Bard's duplicate, the Terran Paul Harrell, to Darkover. Bard explains the basics of Darkover to Harrell, now called Paolo Harryl. He is passed off at court as a nedestro relation. Bard gives Melisendra to Paul, which backfires when they fall in love.

Bard discovers that Paul is immune to laran-based illusions and decides to use him to retrieve Carlina from the Island of Silence. Paul succeeds in kidnapping her, and returns her to Bard. Bard rapes her, justifying his actions with the claim that they are married (which they aren't). Carlina uses her laran to overwhelm Bard with the empathy he lacks, making him feel the humiliation and fear of all of the women he has used. Emotionally wrecked, he asks Paul to take over as Lord General.

Bard rides to Neskaya Tower, seeking assistance from Melora MacAran. He admits that he is better knowing the truth about himself and about what he has done to those around him.

Varzil the Good, Keeper of Neskaya, explains that several other Towers have joined The Compact, since the recent destruction of Hali. He explains that Bard is a pivot around which history flows, and that Bard's acceptance of The Compact will help unify Darkover.

Melisendra helps Carlina recover from her ordeal. Carlina realizes that the Priestesses of Avarra can work with the Sisterhood of the Sword to aid those unable to travel to the Island of Silence. It's hinted that these two groups will eventually evolve into the Order of Renunciates.

Castle Asturias is attacked. Carlina, Melisendra and others escape. Rafael di Asturien and his son, Alaric, die when a staircase collapses, and with them, the only legitimate claimant to the Asturias throne. Paul Harrell is crowned king, having been mistaken for Bard. He marries Melisendra.

The real Bard returns to the castle with Varzil the Good. The tower workers join Carlina in nursing the wounded. Bard and Paul straighten out their mistaken identity problem, Bard claiming that Paul was acting as his proxy.

Geremy Hastur arrives, offering an alliance between Hastur and di Asturien. He reports that all of the Towers have now sworn neutrality, and that their stockpiles of laran weapons will be destroyed. The alliance must now hold Aldaran to his side of the Karadin River, since he has refused to sign The Compact.

Aldaran attacks with clingfire, destroying the rest of the castle. Paul and Bard work to get the survivors out of the castle. Bard comes to realize that he must release Carlina in order to marry Melora, whom he truly loves.

== Major characters ==
- Bard mac Fianna (aka Bard di Asturien aka The Kilghard Wolf), nedestro nephew of King Ardrin of Asturias
- Rafael di Asturien, Bard's father
- Paul Harrell (aka Paolo Harryl), a Terran convict and duplicate of Bard di Asturien
- Carlina di Asturien, Bard's cousin and intended wife, later a priestess of Avarra called Sister Liriel
- Melora MacAran, a leronis
- Melisendra MacAran, the mother of Bard's only son Erlend
- Varzil Ridenow (aka Varzil the Good), Keeper of Neskaya Tower

== Minor characters ==
- King Adrin di Asturien, Bard's uncle
- Beltran di Asturien, Carlina's brother
- Alaric di Asturien, Rafael di Asturien's son
- Geremy Hastur, a foster of the Asturien family, son of King Istvan of Carcosa
- Ginevra Harryl, Geremy Hastur's wife
- Gareth MacAran, an elderly laranzu

== Sources ==
- Jaffery, Sheldon (1987). Future and Fantastic Worlds. Mercer Island, Washington: Starmont House. pp. 134–135. ISBN 1-55742-002-5.
