= The Shattered Chain =

1976 novel by Marion Zimmer Bradley

- Cover of the first edition
- Author: Marion Zimmer Bradley
- Cover artist: George Barr
- Language: English
- Series: Darkover
- Genre: Science fantasy
- Publisher: DAW Books
- Publication date: 1976
- Publication place: United States
- Media type: Print (paperback)
- Pages: 287
- Preceded by: Rediscovery
- Followed by: The Spell Sword

The Shattered Chain is a novel by American writer Marion Zimmer Bradley, part of her Darkover series. In terms of the Darkover timeline, The Shattered Chain takes place about ten years before Thendara House.

The Shattered Chain is the first Darkovan novel to explore the world of the Renunciates - the Free Amazons or comhii letzi. The Renunciates are women who, despite living in a deeply patriarchal and feudal culture, have renounced both the protection and control of men, cutting their hair and living apart, vowing never to marry di catenas with a man.

The Shattered Chain is divided into three parts, the first titled 'Rohana Ardais: Comynara', the second 'Magda Lorne: Terran Agent' and the third, 'Jaelle n'ha Melora: Free Amazon', and each follows one female character's experiences with the Free Amazons of Darkover.

== Plot summary ==
=== Part I: Rohana Ardais, Comynara ===
Lady Rohana Ardais, a Comyn woman of middle-age who possesses psychic laran abilities, specifically telepathy, travels with a band of Renunciates to the city of Shainsa. She hopes to free her kinswoman, Melora, who was kidnapped ten years earlier by a Dry Town raider. In the desert Dry Towns, women are literally owned by men and kept in chains as property.

While the women manage to free the heavily pregnant Melora and her twelve-year-old daughter Jaelle, Melora dies giving birth to a son, leaving Jaelle in the care of Rohana. Jaelle rejects the Comyn life, rather choosing to stay with the Renunciates. The section ends with the Jaelle's request of her new foster-mother, Kindra: "Foster-mother, will you cut my hair?"

Rohana's experiences with the Renunciates and in the Dry Towns profoundly change her self-perception as a woman, and of the relationship between the sexes.

=== Part II: Magda Lorne, Terran Agent ===
Twelve years later, Terran agent Magda Lorne assumes Renunciate disguise under the direction of Rohana, in order to save her ex-husband, Peter Haldane, from kidnappers (who believe he is Rohana's son). Just as Rohana's journey to rescue Melora was prompted by her male kin's refusal to jeopardize the Domains' political relationship with the Dry Towns, Magda's Terran employers refuse to rescue Peter for similar reasons.

Magda travels alone, hoping to escape notice. She comes across a group of genuine Renunciates led by the now-adult Jaelle. Magda's deceit is uncovered, and she is forced to take the Renunciate oath, the traditional punishment for a woman who takes the guise of a Renunciate without actually being one. Magda agrees to enter Nevarsin Guild House to begin training as a Renunciate, but secretly intends to escape and continue with the original rescue plan. Shortly after parting from the other Renunciates, Magda and Jaelle are attacked by bandits. Jaelle is seriously injured. Magda must choose whether to abandon Jaelle and hold true to her responsibility to her ex-husband, or to uphold her oath to the Renunciates and to the injured Jaelle. Magda chooses to do both, taking Jaelle with her into the mountains, rescuing Peter, and then traveling with both to the Ardais estate.

Magda's conflict and eventual decision to abide by her oath to Jaelle and to the Renunciates echoes Rohana's earlier inner conflict in choosing whether to leave her life for the Renunciates or to continue in her life as Comyn nobility. Rohana chooses to continue as a noblewoman, but uses her position as head of a domain for good, taking her epileptic husband's place in the Comyn council and running her estate. Magda eventually chooses to pursue the life of a Renunciate.

=== Part III: Jaelle n'ha Melora, Free Amazon ===
Jaelle, Magda and Peter shelter for the winter at the mountain estate of Ardais, with Rohana, her husband and children. Peter meets the aggressive and intimidating Kyril Ardais, his doppelganger twin, the man the bandits intended to kidnap. Jaelle learns that Rohana has chosen to remain a traditional Comyn woman to protect her children from her husband's enraged outbursts, and protect her epileptic husband from himself. Her experiences with the Renunciates have freed her, even if she has chosen a traditional path.

Jaelle chooses to become freemate to Peter, and questions both her choice to become a Renunciate at a young age, along with the decision to ignore her developing laran.

In the spring, Jaelle, Magda, and Peter return to Thendara, where Jaelle must face her responsibility as an heir to a Comyn domain with powerful and untrained laran. Magda must decide whether to honor her oath to the Renunciates and to her now-dear friend Jaelle, or returns to the Terran zone to continue her work as translator and agent.

Jaelle seeks a third choice, choosing to live with Peter as freemates in the Terran zone in Thendara, undertaking Magda's role as translator. Magda chooses to comply with her Renunciate oath, agreeing to train at Thendara Guildhouse.

The women's stories are completed in the sequel novel, Thendara House.

== Characters ==
- Jaelle n'ha Melora (aka Jaelle Aillard), a Renunciate
- Magda Lorne (aka Margali n'ha Ysabet), a Terran operative
- Peter Haldane, Magda's ex-husband, a Terran intelligence officer
- Rohana Ardais, wife of Gabriel Ardais
- Melora Aillard, mother of Jaelle
- Kindra, a Renunciate
- Jalak of Shainsa, Dry Town bandit

== Gender and society ==
The Shattered Chain presents the Renunciate organization and worldview in greater detail than previous books in the series. The first free Amazon character that Bradley created, Kyla Raineach in The Planet Savers, was a two-dimensional caricature who ended up rather conventionally falling in love with her male employer. As the series developed, the Renunciates evolved into a complex experiment in separatist feminism. The Renunciates are one of the most popular character groups in the Darkover series, resulting in a considerable amount fan fiction, some of which ended up in the 12 short story anthologies.

The Shattered Chain is a distinct deviation from the male-dominated narratives of Bradley's previous Darkovan novels, and also as an experiment in feminist writing for an author who had previously written a conventionally male-dominated fiction.

Later novels in the Renunciate series, in particular Thendara House, explore issues of female sexuality and matriarchal social structures, with particular emphasis on the character Magda's developing sense of herself as a lesbian, and as an independent woman raised to be a 'traditional Darkovan woman' and yet living a liberated, autonomous life beyond the rule of fathers and husbands.

Linda Leith suggests that these novels express Bradley's ambivalence towards Rousseauist society (Darkover) on the one hand, and American technological society (Terran Empire) on the other. The Renunciate characters of Magda and Jaelle offered the author an opportunity to explore the world of women-centered and lesbian-accepting communities within a patriarchal context.

Susan Schwartz, writing for The New York Times, noted of this book: "Bradley may have followed C. L. Moore in creating Amazons, but she raises her book The Shattered Chain above the level of heroic fantasy by having her characters explicitly debate the varieties of feminist theory, discussing among other things the merits of celibacy, lesbianism and conventional marriage".

== Sources ==
- Jaffery, Sheldon (1987). Future and Fantastic Worlds. Mercer Island, Washington: Starmont House. p. 67. ISBN 978-1-55742-002-2.
