= The Bloody Sun =

1964 novel by Marion Zimmer Bradley

- Cover of the first edition
- Author: Marion Zimmer Bradley
- Language: English
- Series: Darkover
- Genre: Science fantasy
- Publisher: Ace Books
- Publication date: 1964
- Publication place: United States
- Media type: Print (paperback)
- Pages: 191
- ISBN: 978-0-441-06854-8
- OCLC: 14627108
- Preceded by: The Winds of Darkover
- Followed by: The Heritage of Hastur

The Bloody Sun is a science fantasy novel by American writer Marion Zimmer Bradley, part of her Darkover series. It was first published by Ace Books in 1964. The novel was substantially rewritten, expanded, and republished under the same title in 1979; Bradley's short story "To Keep the Oath" was included in this edition and all subsequent reprintings.

The expanded rewrite retains the basic plot structure but is more closely connected to several other Darkover books, especially The Forbidden Tower. It also changes the identity of one of Kerwin's parents, although the later book Exile's Song uses his textually original parentage as background information.

== Plot summary ==
Damon Ridenow learns that Leonie Hastur, Keeper of Arilinn, has died. His daughter, Cleindori (a nickname, meaning "Golden Bell"; her real name was Dorilys Aillard, daughter of Jaelle n'ha Melora) arrived with Kennard Alton in tow. She has decided to go to Arilinn to train as their Keeper. Ridenow objects, but can't talk her out of her decision.

About forty years later, Jefferson Andrew Kerwin, age 29, arrives on Darkover. He knows that he was born there, and spent his first ten years in the Spaceman's Orphanage. In the Trade City, he meets Ragan, who identifies a blue crystal that Jeff wears as a matrix. He is mistaken by several Darkovan natives for a member of the Comyn aristocracy.

Jeff tries staring into his matrix crystal and hears voices saying that he must find his way, unaided. Defying orders, he follows his instincts into the Old Town. He arrives at the Alton townhouse and meets Kennard Alton, Taniquel, and Auster. They tell him he has passed a test for laran.

Kennard tells Jeff that his mother's name was Cleindori and his father was Terran; that after she was murdered, Jeff was put in the orphanage for his own safety, but he had been sent to Earth before his relations could reclaim him.

Jeff meets Elorie of Arilinn and the other members of Arilinn Tower. Kennard explains the basics of Darkovan society and Tower functioning. The tower circle accepts Jeff, except for Auster, who remains hostile. Jeff remains for training.

The tower performs some mining experiments, only to have their claims jumped by the Aldarans. Austur believes it to be a Terran trick. They form a circle to identify the spy. It turns out to be Ragan, the weaselly man Jeff met his first night in the Trade City. Jeff claims vengeance, but the attempt to capture Ragan fails.

Jeff decides to leave Arilinn, and Elorie, who has fallen in love with him, decides to go with him. The other members of the tower react with horror, indicating that Cleindori's work is far from finished. They go to the spaceport for safety. Jeff and Elorie marry, but are unable to leave Darkover for legal reasons.

Elorie uses her Keeper's training to probe Jeff's memories of the death of his mother. He discovers that he is the son, not of Jefferson Kerwin, but of Lewis-Arnad Lanart-Alton. Kennard is his uncle. He also realises that Auster and Ragan are twins, the true children of Jefferson Kerwin, by Cassilda Lanart-Ridenow.

The couple seeks help from Dyan Ardais, Elorie's half brother, to obtain an audience with Lord Hastur, who admits that he should have done more to protect Cleindori, and her father, Damon Ridenow, saying he will not make the same mistake with Elorie. He listens to her story.

Unable to contact Arilinn to warn them about the threat posed by the unsuspected link between Auster and Ragan, Jeff and Elorie ride to Arilinn. They are able to exclude Ragan from the circle and complete their task. Elorie is injured, but survives.

Jeff tells the circle that the experience proves Cleindori was right – the matrix mechanics are a science, not a mystical art, and that a keeper need not be a cloistered virgin. Jeff remains on Darkover, now accepted into the families of the Comyn.

== Characters ==
- Jefferson Andrew Kerwin, Jr. (aka Damon Aillard and in later books, Damon Ridenow), son of Cleindori Aillard, raised by the Kerwin family
- Kennard Alton, heir to Alton
- Elorie Ardais, Keeper of Arillin
- Auster and Ragan Ridenow, sons of Cassilda Lanart-Ridenow and Jefferson Kerwin, Sr.

== Inconsistencies with other books in the series ==
- Jeff's parents are identified in this book as Cleindori Aillard and Lewis Lanart-Alton. Elorie pieces together his original name as Damon Aillard, since the Aillards rank the Altons. In Sharra's Exile, he names the same parents, identifying himself as Damon Lanart-Aillard, but in Exile's Song, Mikhal Lanart-Alton says that his name is Damon Ridenow, and identifies his father as Arnad Ridenow, who is also identified as Jeff's father in the original 1964 version of The Bloody Sun and in The Darkover Concordance.
- Kennard says that marriage is a fairly recent development on Darkover, but all of the Darkover books, including Stormqueen!, which represents the oldest story in the chronology, includes some version of monogamous marriage.

== Publication history ==
- 1964, USA, Ace Books OCLC 14627108, pub date 1964, paperback
- 1966, Germany, Pebel OCLC 73650840, pub date 1966, paperback, in German as Die blutige Sonne
- 1979, USA, Ace Books OCLC 5031347, pub date 1979, paperback, expanded and published with "To Keep the Oath"
- 1979, USA, Gregg Press ISBN 0-8398-2513-7, pub date 1979, hardcover, as The Bloody Sun and To Keep the Oath
- 1987, UK, Arrow Books ISBN 0-09-917820-6, pub date August 1987, paperback, 1979 text without the additional short story
- 1993, UK, Severn House ISBN 0-7278-4446-6, pub date March 1993, hardcover, reprints the 1979 edition
- 1994, USA, DAW Books ISBN 0-88677-603-1, pub date February 1994, paperback, reprints the 1979 edition
