= The Forbidden Tower =

1977 novel by Marion Zimmer Bradley

- Cover of the first edition
- Author: Marion Zimmer Bradley
- Cover artist: Richard Hescox
- Language: English
- Series: Darkover
- Genre: Science fantasy
- Publisher: DAW Books
- Publication date: 1977
- Publication place: United States
- Media type: Print (paperback)
- Pages: 364
- ISBN: 0-87997-323-4
- OCLC: 3303866
- Preceded by: The Spell Sword and the Hilary Castamir stories in Marion Zimmer Bradley's Darkover
- Followed by: Thendara House

The Forbidden Tower is a science fantasy novel by American writer Marion Zimmer Bradley, part of her Darkover series. Originally published by DAW Books (No. 256) in 1977, it is the sequel to The Spell Sword and is followed by The Bloody Sun. The major characters also appear in Thendara House and City of Sorcery.

This book is set approximately forty years after the events in the book Rediscovery. The Hilary Castamir stories in the collection Marion Zimmer Bradley's Darkover precede the events in The Forbidden Tower by about ten years.

== Plot summary ==
On the road to Armida, Damon Ridenow encounters Leonie Hastur, Keeper of Arilinn. Leonie tells him that she wishes to persuade Callista Lanart to return to Arilinn Tower and replace her as Keeper. She is aware that Callista wishes to marry the Terran, Andrew Carr, who rescued her from the Caves of Corresanti (as seen in The Spell Sword). After they arrive, Leonie meets with Callista and unable to persuade her to return, releases her from her Keeper's vow. Dom Esteban, Callista's father, consents to her marriage. The next day, a joint wedding is held – Ellemir is joined to Damon and Callista to Andrew in freemate marriage.

Andrew recalls that Leonie has warned him that Callista was trained in the old ways of Keepers, and may not be able to consummate their relationship for a long time. Ellemir has a premonition of her father's death. Desiderio Leynier, a nedestro relation (Dom Alton's illegitimate son), creates trouble at the wedding feast.

Guardsmen who have been caught in a blizzard are brought to Armida. When it becomes clear that some of the men will lose their feet to frostbite, Damon, working with Andrew and Dezi, uses his laran powers to restore their circulation. The experience causes Damon to feel that laran-based healing should be available to all Darkovans, not restricted to the cloistered residents of the Towers. He reflects that it is commonly believed that this would bring back the Ages of Chaos.

Callista agrees to share Andrew's bed. They become telepathically aware of the lovemaking of Damon and Ellemir. When Andrew accidentally breaks the link, Callista's Keeper training cuts in and Andrew takes the full blast of her laran. Damon comes to realize that Leonie has tampered with Callista's channels before she reached puberty – the "old ways" that Leonie had warned him about.

Andrew is overwhelmed the experiences of the past day and walks out into the courtyard to think. He is overcome by a compulsion to leave Armida, and wanders out into the snow. Damon realizes that Dezi has overpowered Andrew telepathically and driven him away. After Andrew is rescued, Dom Esteban tells Damon that "there is bad blood" in Dezi. Damon strips Dezi of his matrix.

Damon decides to attempt timesearch: to contact Keepers in other times via the Overworld. He meets the legendary Varzil the Good of Neskaya. Varzil recommends the sacrament of Year's End as a way of freeing Callista from her Keeper's restrictions, but the meaning of the ritual has been lost.

Dom Esteban has premonitions of evil menacing his son, Domenic. That night, Callista wakes from a dream in which Domenic has come to harm. A guardsman arrives at Armina to inform Dom Esteban that Domenic has died during sword practice. Callista believes that he has been murdered.

Dom Esteban designates his youngest son, Valdir-Lewis Lanart-Alton to be his heir. He designates Damon Ridenow as Regent of Alton. Damon discovers that Dezi has taken Domenic's matrix while he lay injured, thus killing Domenic, and rekeyed it to himself. Callista uses her ability to take Domenic's matrix away from Dezi. He dies as a result.

Damon realizes that their actions constitute an unofficial matrix circle – a forbidden tower. Leonie Hastur informs him that she will bring charges in council regarding his illegal matrix work. The two couples confront the council. Leonie challenges Damon to a duel between Arilinn Tower and the Forbidden Tower.

Damon breaks down the remaining emotional walls separating the two couples, realizing that essence of the sacrament of Year's End is a shared sexual experience under the influence of kireseth flowers. Callista and Andrew finally consummate their marriage.

At dawn, they enter into the Overworld and build their tower. After a prolonged battle with Arilinn, Damon asks for a truce. He tells Leonie that they have rediscovered the old way of working, where a Keeper need not be a cloistered virgin. He realizes that Leonie herself was trained in the old ways (the illegal neutering of a Comyn woman), and mourns for her loss. Leonie acknowledges Damon's right to keep his tower.

The two couples return to Armida.

== Characters ==
- Damon Ridenow, a former matrix technician from Arilinn
- Andrew Carr (aka Ann'dra Carr), a Terran
- Ellemir Lanart, wife of Damon Ridenow
- Callista Lanart, a former Keeper-nominate from Arilinn
- Esteban Lanart, Lord Alton, father of Ellemir, Callista, Domenic and Valdir
- Leonie Hastur, Keeper of Arilinn
- Desiderio Leynier (aka Dezi), a nedestro relation of the Lanarts
- Ferrika, Armida's free Amazon midwife

== Consequences of the events in The Forbidden Tower to the overall Darkover series ==
- Valdir Lanart-Alton becomes head of the Alton clan, despite being his father’s youngest son. This line produces Kennard Alton, Lewis Alton, and Marguerida Alton-Hastur, all of whom who become central to Darkover's survival.
- Darkovan society will eventually accept the idea of non-virgin female Keepers and the revival of male Keepers.
- The taboo forbidding the use of a matrix outside of a Tower will fade away. Matrix mechanics and technicians began to be licensed to operate outside of a Tower's confines.

== Children of the Forbidden Tower ==
- Dorilys Aillard (aka Cleindori) is a daughter of Damon Ridenow and Jaelle Aillard (aka Jaelle n'ha Melora). She challenged the restrictions and traditions laid upon keepers at Arilinn and is murdered by Darkovan traditionalists.
- Cassilde Lanart-Ridenow, described as the daughter of Damon Ridenow and Callista Lanart-Carr in The Bloody Sun. She is also described as Cassilde Aillard, the daughter of Damon Ridenow and Jaelle Aillard (aka Jaelle n'ha Melora) in The Alton Gift. She is murdered by Darkovan traditionalists.
- Domenic Lanart-Ridenow, son of Ellemir Lanart and Damon Ridenow.
- Hilary Lanart-Carr, daughter of Callista Lanart-Carr and Andrew Carr.
- Gabriel Lanart, son of Ellemir Lanart and Andrew Carr.
- Shaya n'ha Margali, daughter of Magda Lorne (Margali n'ha Yasbet) and unknown father.
- Unnamed MacAnndra, son of Andrew Carr and Armida's Renunciate healer, Ferrika.

== Significance ==
Like the Darkover-Renunciate books, what underlies The Forbidden Tower is a discussion of the value of monogamy, women's roles in society, the place of one's family in decision making, and whether a woman may act as an agent independent of these forces. In the books that follow, particularly The Bloody Sun, Bradley acknowledges that the reaction of a traditional society to unwanted progress is often a retreat to more traditionalism and violence.

== Awards and nominations ==
- 1978, Hugo Award for Best Novel nomination

== Publication history ==
- 1977, USA, DAW Books ISBN 0-87997-323-4, pub date September 1977, paperback
- 1979, UK, ISBN 0-8398-2405-X, pub date 1979, paperback
- 1979, USA, Gregg Press ISBN 0-8398-2405-X, pub date 1979, hardcover
- 1994, UK, Severn House ISBN 0-7278-4589-6, pub date March 1994, hardcover

== Sources ==
- Brown, Charles N.; William G. Contento (November 20, 2007). "The Locus Index to Science Fiction (1984–1998)".
- Jaffery, Sheldon (1987). Future and Fantastic Worlds. Mercer Island, Washington: Starmont House. p. 89. ISBN 1-55742-002-5.
