= Sharra's Exile =

1981 novel by Marion Zimmer Bradley

- Cover of the first edition
- Author: Marion Zimmer Bradley
- Cover artist: Hannah M. G. Shapero
- Language: English
- Series: Darkover
- Genre: Science fantasy
- Publisher: DAW Books
- Publication date: 1981
- Publication place: United States
- Media type: Print (paperback)
- Pages: 365
- ISBN: 0-87997-659-4
- OCLC: 7797651
- Preceded by: The Planet Savers
- Followed by: The World Wreckers

Sharra's Exile is a science fantasy novel by American writer Marion Zimmer Bradley. Part of the Darkover series, it is a sequel to The Heritage of Hastur. This novel is a complete rewrite of The Sword of Aldones published by Ace in 1962. The second chapter of book one (pages 39 to 57) of Sharra's Exile was previously published in a slightly different form as a short story entitled "Blood Will Tell" in The Keeper's Price.

Sharra's Exile falls in the part of the Darkover timeline that the author called "Against the Terrans: The Second Age (after the Comyn)". The story begins about three years after the events of The Heritage of Hastur and less than a year after The Planet Savers.

== Plot summary ==
=== Prologue ===
Lew and Kennard Alton have been absent from Darkover for three years, since the events of the Sharra Rebellion (as seen in The Heritage of Hastur). Despite numerous attempts, Terran medics were not able to restore Lew's hand, but he is slowly recovering his mental and emotional control.

=== Book One ===
Regis Hastur is now 18 years old and has recently completed his training in the Guard and is attending sessions of the Cortes. His paxman, Danilo Syrtis, heir to the Ardais Domain, has spent the previous winter doing so in the Hellers. The young men meet in Thendara and spend the evening in a tavern, debating the future of Darkover.

Lew and Kennard arrive on Vainwal. They meet Diotima Ridenow, who is on holiday with two of her brothers, Lerrys and Geremy. The first meeting between Dio and Lew is awkward, but they eventually fall in love.

Dio reveals that she is pregnant, gives birth prematurely and the baby dies. She has a nervous breakdown, and Lerrys, Dio's brother, decides to take his sister away from Vainwal and from Lew. Lew, believing that Dio has rejected him, decides not to follow.

Kennard receives a message from Dyan Ardais: he must go back to Darkover to prevent the Comyn Council from granting the Alton Domain to Gabriel Lanart. Kennard dies before they can return. In his last living instant, he sends a strong telepathic order, with the full Alton gift, to Lew: "You must go back to Darkover, fight for your brother's rights and for the honor of Alton and the Domain".

=== Book Two ===
The Comyn Council proposes granting the Alton Domain to Gabriel Lanart. Two challengers appear: Marius Alton and Jeff Kerwin (née Damon Aillard-Alton and called Ridenow; from The Bloody Sun). Lew Alton arrives in the Crystal chamber to claim the Alton domain.

The mentally unstable Prince Derik announces that he has arranged a marriage agreement between Keeper Callina Aillard and Lord Beltran Aldaran, in an attempt to reunite the Aldaran Domain to the Comyn. Callina does not want to marry Beltran, but the older isolationist members of the Council (especially Danvan and Dyan) believe that reuniting the Comyn will help them repel Terran colonialism.

Regis Hastur visits Callina Aillard in the Comyn Tower. Callina asks Regis to persuade Lew Alton to bring the Sharra matrix into the Comyn Tower and place it under the safeguard of the ancient keeper, Ashara Alton. Just before Regis' departure, he learns that Beltran has started his journey to Thendara at the head of a massive army.

Lew goes to the Comyn Tower to visit Callina, hoping to discover how to destroy the Sharra matrix. During their discussion, Callina tells Lew that she is afraid of Ashara and that the Council is trying to pressure her into the marriage with Beltran. Lew and Callina realize that they have very strong feelings for each other.

Regis discusses the political situation with his paxman, Danilo, and Dyan Ardais. Dyan wants to resolve the Alton succession by having Lew abdicate in favor of a mysterious Alton child that he knows about (from Exile's Song). Moreover, Dyan wants to ally with Beltran so that the Council can threaten the Terrans with the Sharra matrix, forcing them to leave Darkover.

Regis arrives at the Crystal Chamber for the start of Council. Danvan Hastur calls in Beltran Aldaran to represent the seventh domain. Lew tries to convince the Council that Beltran is dangerous. Callina asks Beltran if he has sworn allegiance to the Compact, the most sacred of Comyn laws. He says that he will accept the Compact once he has been accepted in the Comyn and he plans to give his Terran weapons to his promised wife, Callina, as a wedding gift. Suddenly, a giant fire form of Sharra appears in the Council. Beltran and several other Comyn lords flee the room. Lew learns that Sharra's illusion was created by Regis as a warning, despite the telepathic dampers.

Lew is plagued with thoughts of Sharra and finally goes to Callina in the Aillard apartments, where he also finds Linnell and Regis. Callina asks Lew to meet with Ashara.

Ashara explains that Sharra is a goddess and the matrix is a door through which she can reach our world. The only weapon that will defeat her is the Sword of Aldones, a weapon kept in the rhu fead, the holy Chapel at Hali. To reach the sword, Callina and Lew must penetrate the defensive spells, which require a person who is of Comyn blood and was not reared on Darkover. Ashara explains that a Cherilly duplicate (or unrelated twin) might be able to defeat the defenses. Callina and Lew use a giant matrix screen to teleport to Darkover a Terran named Kathie Marshall, the young nurse that took care of Dio on Vainwal, who is the identical double of Linnell.

On the morning of the Festival, Regis learns from Dan Lawton that the Terrans are seeking the arrest of Robert Kadarin. He threatens to send the spaceforce police to Thendara if the Comyn fail to turn over Kadarin. On his way back to the Castle, Regis stops to see Beltran offering his Terran weapons to Callina. In a strong telepathic rapport with Dyan Ardais, Regis destroys all of the weapons. Through this experience, Regis learns that Dyan has the Alton gift.

In Comyn Castle, Regis meets Lew, and learns of the existence of Lew's daughter, Marja, a six-year-old child who is already laran-aware. Lew leaves Marja in the care an Alton retainer, and goes to find Callina.

During the Festival ball, Lew sees Dio. They quarrel about Dio's departure from Vainwal, and Lew discovers that Lerrys lied to both of them in order to separate them. Just before the moonlight dance, Lew sees a strange man dressed as a harlequin.

Danvan Hastur celebrates the marriage between Callina and Beltran. At the end of the dance that closes the handfasting, Lew suddenly recognizes Kadarin. Thyra and Kadaran attempt to compel Lew to join them, but Regis uses his newly emerged laran abilities to rescue Lew. The Sharra matrix kills Linnell. Kadarin and Thyra use the matrix to teleport out of the Comyn Castle.

=== Book Three ===
Guardsman Gabriel Lanart-Alton arrests Beltran. Regis discovers that Prince Derik has died as a result of Sharra. Regis is now Heir of the Domains.

Regis seeks Dyan's assistance, and finds him in the Aldaran apartments, having a discussion with Beltran. Dyan reveals his plans: he wants to use Sharra against the Terrans to expel them from Darkover. Regis flees the Aldaran apartments to avoid revealing that Dyan, himself, has the Alton gift and can therefore operate Sharra.

Lew, Kathie and Callina retrieve the Sword of Aldones from the rhu fead. They are attacked by Kadarin and Thyra waiting. Kadarin's attack is repelled by the sword, but Thyra attacks and wounds Lew.

Regis authorizes Dan Lawton to send a helicopter to Hali to rescue Lew, Callina, and Kathie. When the helicopter returns, Lew is nearly dead, but Regis takes Sword of Aldones and transforms into Hastur, Son of Light. He heals Lew instantaneously. Lawton arrests Kadarin and Thyra, but they escape.

With Callina's help, Regis tries to cleanse Lew's matrix but fails; the bond with Sharra is too strong. In the forecourt of Comyn Castle, Thyra and Kadarin wield the Sharra Matrix against Regis, who has the Sword of Aldones. Dyan arrives and frees Lew from Sharra. Regis strikes the Sharra matrix with the Sword of Aldones. Kadarin and Thyra disappear with Sharra, but this action results in the accidental death of Dyan Ardais and Callina Aillard. Lew realizes that Callina was almost entirely possessed by Ashara, and was willing to marry Beltran in order to escape Ashara's domination. Regis' hair has turned completely white.

=== Epilogue ===
After the death of so many Comyn, Darkover needs to change: it is going to become a full member of the Terran Empire. Lew goes into voluntary exile with his wife Dio and their daughter Marja. He is going to be the first representative from Darkover to the Imperial Senate.

== Characters ==
- Lew Alton / Lewis-Kennard Montray-Alton: The heir to the Alton Domain.
- Kennard Alton / Kennard-Gwynn Lanart-Alton: Lord Alton, Commandant of the Guards.
- Regis Hastur / Regis-Rafael Felix Alar Hastur y Elhalyn: The heir to the Hastur Domain.
- Danilo Syrtis / Danilo-Felix Syrtis-Ardais: Paxman to Regis Hastur and adopted heir to the Ardais Domain.
- Diotima Ridenow: Young woman of the Ridenow family, Lew's wife.
- Kadarin / Robert Raimon Kadarin: main instigator of Sharra's awakening.
- Thyra Darriell: Kadarin's wife and Marjorie's half-sister. An extremely powerful, but wild (self-taught) telepath, she is mentally unstable.
- Beltran Aldaran: Lew's cousin and Thyra's half-brother, he is the heir to the Aldaran Domain and the main instigator of Sharra's awakening with Kadarin.
- Dyan Ardais: Regent of the Ardais domain, he was not allowed Tower training for unspecified, but vaguely scandalous reasons.
- Jeff Kerwin / Jefferson Andrew Kerwin, Junior: Born Damon Aillard-Alton, he is the nephew and friend of Kennard, and the protagonist of The Bloody Sun.
- Callina Lindir-Aillard: Lady Aillard, former Keeper at Arilinn, she is now the attendant of Ashara.
- Ashara Alton / Ashara: very old, almost legendary, reclusive Keeper of the Comyn Castle Tower.
- Linnell Aillard: Callina's sister and Lew's foster-sister, she is engaged to Prince Derik.
- Kathie Marshall: Young nurse who takes care of Dio on Vainwal, she is Linnell's Cherilly twin (completely identical double).

== Inconsistencies with other books in the series ==
In this book, Ashara Alton describes Sharra as a goddess, and the matrix as a door through which she can reach Darkover. In The Sword of Aldones, the original telling of this story, she describes Sharra as a powerful matrix with which an Alton leronis was accidentally joined, and around which the legend of the goddess Sharra has arisen. Walter Breen's The Darkover Concordance indicates that while some of the Sharra matrices legitimately belonged to the Forge Folk, some were weapons left over from the Ages of Chaos. He felt that the Sharra matrix from this book is in the latter class, which does not match either of the two other origin stories.

== Reception ==
Dave Pringle reviewed Sharra's Exile for Imagine magazine and wrote: "Jewels and telepathy, a hierarchical society with elaborate protocol, obsessions with lineage and inheritance – all the familiar ingredients are here, mixed into a fine stew of anguish and action". Rosemary Herbert in Library Journal praised the book's "well-drawn characters". Lillian M. Heldreth writing in Survey of Modern Fantasy Literature however compared it unfavorably with other Darkover novels, stating that "when the fantasy element dominates and edges into the supernatural, as it does in Sharra's Exile, it tends to weaken the structure". It placed 8th on the 1982 Locus Awards poll for Best Science Fiction Novel.

As with the preceding The Heritage of Hastur, Sharra's Exile features gay male relationships. In 1989 it was highlighted by Eric Garber in Out/Look magazine as one of the best gay sci-fi and fantasy novels. The books have been noted for their treatment of coming out in a fantasy setting.

== Reviews ==
- Review by Jeff Frane (1981) in Locus #250, November 1981
- Review by C. J. Henderson [as by Chris Henderson] (1981) in Dragon Magazine, December 1981
- Review by Debbie Notkin (1982) in Rigel Science Fiction #3, Winter 1982
- Review by Chris Bailey (1983) in Paperback Inferno, Volume 7, #2

== Sources ==
- Jaffery, Sheldon (1987). Future and Fantastic Worlds. Mercer Island, Washington: Starmont House. p. 155. ISBN 1-55742-002-5.
- Sharra's Exile title listing at the Internet Speculative Fiction Database
