= Darkover series =

Science fiction-fantasy book series

Darkover
- The Planet Savers (1958), the first novel set in the Darkover universe.
- Author: Marion Zimmer Bradley
- Country: United States
- Language: English
- Genre: Science fiction; Fantasy; Sword and sorcery
- Published: 1958–1996
- Media type: Print (hardback and paperback)

The Darkover series is a collection of science fiction-fantasy novels and short stories written by Marion Zimmer Bradley. The series is set on the planet of Darkover, where a group of humans have been stranded and have developed their own unique culture and society. The books focus on the conflicts between the human settlers and the native population of Darkover, as well as the struggles of the various factions on the planet. The series is known for its complex world-building and exploration of themes such as gender, sexuality, and mental illness.

Occasionally, Bradley collaborated with other authors, and she also edited and published Darkover stories by other authors in a series of anthologies. After Bradley's death, the series was continued, mostly by Deborah J. Ross with the permission of the Marion Zimmer Bradley Literary Works Trust.

Commenting on the significance of the Darkover series, the science fiction critic and author Baird Searles said that the books were "destined to be The Foundation of the 1970s".

== Origins ==
=== The Origin of Darkover ===
In the introduction to "The Ballad of Hastur and Cassilda" by Bradley in the anthology Red Sun of Darkover, Bradley wrote that the literary antecedents of this ballad are "obscure" and arose "before Darkover was Darkover". The antecedents are The King in Yellow (1895) by Robert W. Chambers and perhaps J. R. R. Tolkien's poem "The Lay of Beren and Lúthien", found in the first book of The Lord of the Rings. Bradley adapted many names from The King in Yellow into her books and stories, often using them differently, e. g. the name of a city might become the name of a person. Chambers borrowed some terms in The King in Yellow from the writings of Ambrose Bierce.

In her essay (perhaps a transcribed interview) (Note: "A Darkover Retrospective" says, "Transcriber's note: The [sic] Darkover Retrospective was published as a bonus piece in an Ace Double feature published in April 1980. The copyright page includes the works and copyright dates as follows: The Planet Savers (1962, Ace Books, Inc.), The Waterfall (1976, Marion Zimmer Bradley), and The Sword of Aldones (1962, Ace Books, Inc.)". It is not clear whether the "transcriber" rendered the text in the Ace Double into HTML or transcribed an interview into the Ace Double text. Nor is Bradley very definite on the dates of writing her books.) called "A Darkover Retrospective", Bradley mentioned reading the works of H. Rider Haggard, Talbot Mundy, Robert W. Chambers, and Sax Rohmer, but that she did not begin writing fantasy until she became acquainted with the science-fiction/fantasy of C. L. Moore and Henry Kuttner, apparently when she was in her middle teens and realized that she would never be an opera singer. She wrote, among other things, "about a ruling caste of telepaths which I named Seveners". By the time she was in college this had turned into an "hugely sprawling novel" called "The King and the Sword".

In that book, the Comyn (although called "the Seveners") were much the same as in later novels, with specific telepathic gifts. The seven families were the same, except the Altons were called the Leyniers and the Aillards were called the "Marceau of Valeron", a name that Bradley changed after hearing of the book Skylark of Valeron by E. E. Smith, whom she admired.

Bradley was unable to sell "The King and the Sword", even after she cut it down to "500 manuscript pages" and "located the whole thing on an imaginary planet with a red sun" in a "Galactic Empire", but she kept writing and eventually sold "a shameless pastiche of a [Henry] Kuttner story", Falcons of Narabedla, to Ray Palmer, who had revived a magazine called Other Worlds. Palmer then accepted The Sword of Aldones for publication, but it was the version that had previously been called The King and the Sword. It is not the version published by Ace Books in "1961 [sic, 1962] or thereabouts".

The first Darkover novel to be published was The Planet Savers in 1958, originally, Bradley thinks, in Amazing Stories. Bradley wrote it when she was exploring the idea of multiple personalities, after reading The Three Faces of Eve and some other stories that dealt with the concept. She said: "So that a deeply repressed Terran Medic, Jay Allison, discovered himself in the personality of his repressed alternate who calls himself Jason". She placed the story on the planet she had created for The King and the Sword a.k.a. The Sword of Aldones.

Bradley then published Seven from the Stars and The Door Through Space, also published as Birds of Prey. The latter is expressly said by Bradley to draw on the material that might be called "Darkovan": "The Door Through Space was a kind of replay of the old The King and the Sword". About the former, she does not say, but here is the number seven again.

Don Wollheim, who edited Ace Books, bought The Planet Savers for a reprint, through Bradley's agent, Scott Meredith. Wollheim wanted another novel to print with it. Since Ray Palmer had never printed The Sword of Aldones, or paid Bradley for it, Bradley demanded that he either do that or return the manuscript to her. He returned it. Bradley rewrote it and sent it to Wollheim, who accepted it and the two novels became an Ace Double.

The Sword of Aldones was nominated for a Hugo Award, to Bradley's astonishment. She agreed with critics who said it is "juvenile". She also said that later, when Don Wollheim wanted another science fiction book, she wrote a juvenile novel purposely: Star of Danger.

Bradley, on demand from publishers and fans, later created a backstory, amounting to an entire history of Darkover. As noted below, this history was not always self-consistent.

=== Origins of the Chieri ===
Bradley said that "Yeats' Irish Fairy and Folk Tales [sic, perhaps Fairy and Folk Tales of the Irish Peasantry] and books by James Stephens" probably suggested to her a race of non-humans like the "Irish faery folk of Gaelic legend". After she read Tolkien, the chieri became more like Tolkien's elves, but Bradley conceived of them as ambiguously sexed. She said this idea may have derived from Theodore Sturgeon, who wrote stories about legendary people who "could appear as men to a woman, or as women to a man". (Note: The Forbidden Tower is dedicated to Diana L. Paxson and "Theodore Sturgeon, who first explored the questions which, directly or indirectly, underlie almost everything I have written".) Another influence was Maeterlink's Pelleas and Melisande: she thought of Melisande as a lost fairy who could not find her way home.

After she wrote Star of Danger, Bradley began a science fiction novel about colonists who encountered these faery people, the chieri, one of which she had included in Star of Danger. This novel chronicled "the attempts of this lost and alien race to interbreed with humans". She said it was not dissimilar to a novel by Vercors. She also said it was a garbage and threw it all into the wastebasket before it had a good working title.

Bradley then realized that the chieri were a unisex race, sometimes male and sometimes female. She decided that the issue of sexuality was too difficult to handle in the current milieu of science fiction. She said, "I had no desire to write the kind of story which would have to be published as pornography". In "1970 or so" she went to a science fiction convention (Boskone) and discussed writing with Anne McCaffrey.

Bradley told McCaffrey that she was tired of science fiction and wanted to write Gothics. She did not like the avant-garde novels she had lately read. In response to a question from McCaffrey, she answered "no", she had not read Ursula K. Le Guin's The Left Hand of Darkness and she did not intend to. McCaffrey gave Bradley her own copy of that book, and Bradley read it and was "spellbound". Walter Breen, after reading it himself, told Bradley: "Now you can write that story about the chieri that you thought you couldn't write".

Bradley then had the idea to write The World Wreckers. Edmond Hamilton had been called "The ol' world wrecker" because he destroyed planets, galaxies and even universes in his books. Norman Spinrad had written The Doomsday Machine, but Bradley thought there must be more subtle ways to wreck a world, such as interfering with a fragile ecology. She also saw this book as the end of the Darkover series; a way to end it, like "tossing Sherlock Holmes off the cliff at the Reichenbach Falls".

Bradley, however, realized that she needed one fairly explicit sex scene to make the human-chieri interaction work. Don Wollheim reluctantly told her to go ahead, although he demanded that she use no profanity (which was not her intention anyway), and she demanded in return that he would not change it without consulting her. Bradley claimed that the scene, which "shocked some people and pleased others", was the first time the issue of homosexuality (not to mention sex-changing) had been dealt with directly in science fiction, and said, "I managed to become something like science fiction's token homosexual!"

After the success of The World Wreckers, Don Wollheim was more willing to publish material that would have been considered controversial before. In particular, Bradley mentioned How Are the Mighty Fallen by Thomas Burnett Swann, but every time Bradley said that the Darkover series was ended, friends, fans and casual readers objected, "Oh, don't do that!"

== Themes ==
Several themes are explored by Bradley at length within the books of the series. Psychic powers, treated as a science, are a theme that places the books firmly within the category of science fiction, even in the books that do not have "Terrans", spaceships, or the "Galactic Empire". They can also be called fantasy, because psychic powers appear to be "out and out magic". Other themes are feminism, sexism, the roles of women in society, the roles of men in society, racism, social division (the Comyn nobility and the non-Comyn "commoners"), xenophobia and the clash of cultures, sexual taboos, fate and the horrors of war.

=== Feminism ===
According to Nasrullah Mambrol, "though Bradley did not call herself a feminist, she was both criticized and applauded by those who have".

Bradley received much criticism for her book Darkover Landfall because of the way the women of the incipient colony were treated. When the colonists realized that their spaceship would never fly again, the scientists said that for any colony to survive with a founding population of only a few hundred and no real hope of immigration, the greatest amount of genetic diversity must be maintained. That meant that women must have as many children as possible, by as many men as possible, and every child that survives is needed. The experts believed that miscarriages and infant deaths would be greater on a planet unlike Earth, although of course, this idea is unproven. Bradley was particularly criticized for the scene in which Camilla Del Rey is forbidden to have an abortion, although she wants one, because the child is needed for the colony's survival.

In Bradley's comment for the book: "Darkover Landfall stirred up a furor because some outraged feminists objected to the stand I took in the book, that the survival of the human race on Darkover could, and should, be allowed to supersede the personal convenience of any single woman in the group. I have debated this subject ad nauseam in the fanzines, and I absolutely refuse to debate it again, but to those who refuse to accept the tenet that "Biology is Destiny", I have begun to ask them to show me a vegetarian lion or tiger before they debate the issue further".

The notion of women as "brood mares" (and similar expressions) pervades the novels. Women have few rights, even at the time that the colony is found by the Terran Empire some thousands of years later, because they are still perceived as the bearers of children. The Comyn women are supposed to have children at least until they produce a male heir; the exception to this is in the Aillard Domain, where the head of the Domain runs in the female line. Most males who are not Comyn have similar ideas about the need for a male heir.

In the fictional Darkover world, the Renunciates may be the author's reaction to this sexism. The Renunciates call themselves by that name because they renounce all loyalty to their clan or family and swear never to have a child because a man wants one. Bradley's first novel in the Renunciates series, The Shattered Chain, describes the Renunciates and their principles, and begins with the rescue of a woman who is held against her will by a chieftain of the Dry Towns. Thus Bradley answered the criticisms that arose after the publication of Darkover Landfall. Critics of the earlier work called The Shattered Chain a feminist novel; Joanna Russ placed it on a list of feminist utopias.

=== Racism ===
Racism as a concept is unknown on Darkover, because there are no races. All Darkovans are fair-skinned and have blue or grey eyes, except a few: for example, Marguerida Alton, who is the granddaughter of a chieri, has golden eyes. Brown-eyed Terrans are casually said to have "animal eyes". This epithet is also applied to Lew Alton, who is Comyn, a member of the Alton clan, and a powerful telepath who possesses the Alton Gift. He has a Terran mother and his eyes are brown. Lew has a "problem with identity" that he never solves.

In City of Sorcery, Cholayna Ares, a dark-skinned Terran woman (actually from Alpha Centauri), is asked more than once if her dark skin is the result of a disease. There is no overt racism; Darkovans are simply curious because they have never seen anyone like her before. Bradley handles this issue with sensitivity and at times, wry and ironic humor, having Cholayna's Darkovan friends (who are Renunciates) become outraged at the question.

This theme overlaps with "Clash of Cultures" because some Darkovans express a dislike for Terrans without giving a reason other than they have "different ways".

=== Clash of cultures ===
Bradley said that the clash of cultures, Darkovan v. Terran, that she strengthened when rewriting The Sword of Aldones, was a "theme of all the early Darkover novels".

According to Linda Leith, the opposition between the Terran and Darkovan civilizations is a theme of "nearly all" Darkover fiction. This opposition has the following pairs of contrary elements:

Terra	Darkover
Rational	Intuitive
Technological	Instinctive
Establishment	Counter-establishment
Artificial	Natural
Bourgeois	Feudal
Age	Youth
Male	Female
Heterosexuality	Homosexuality

These contrary elements, as indicated, place Terra to Darkover in a relation of the same type as maleness to femaleness. While there are "cross-overs in the fictions between the two columns", the general linking of Terra with the items in the first column and Darkover with the ones in the second enables the reader to "understand what lies behind some of Bradley's limitations as a writer". Neither society is presented as a utopia, Bradley seems confused about the value of each, and she "is unable to make up her mind whether it is desirable for Terran influence to triumph once and for all".

According to Leith, the opposition of cultures has an "impressive simplicity". The Terrans are technologically advanced, liberal and imperialist. Darkover is non-technological (as far as the Terrans know) and feudal. The rational, scientific, and utilitarian Terran society, aimed at efficiency and practicality, placed on Darkover, which lacks these qualities, creates tension.

However, the two opposing cultures prove to have more in common than one suspects at first, and the contact between them brings about growth or a maturing process in each of them. Leith expresses the meaning of this cultural clash as "to grow or to mature ultimately means to accept the element that has hitherto been missing, in short to reconcile the opposites in oneself". As an example, in The Forbidden Tower, Callista, a virgin untouchable Keeper who has renounced all family ties for the sake of being a Keeper, becomes Andrew's wife. Damon's challenge of the Tower norms and the rules that Keepers must follow helps Callista free herself from her rigid training. In addition, Andrew Carr must accept Darkovan culture and the fact that his relationship with Damon must be a closer one than Terran culture would allow.

The "hope" (Bradley's hope, or the hope of the books) is that the opposites will merge and grow. In other books, Bradley creates more characters capable of crossing the gap between cultures, some of whom have mixed Terran-Darkovan parentage, or were removed from Darkover at a young age (Jeff Kerwin in The Bloody Sun), or Terrans who are able to join Darkovan society. (Note: Leith's essay was written before the publication of Thendara House and its "Bridge Society".)

Leith's opinion is that Darkover is presented as weak compared to the Terran Empire. Darkover is the society that changes in response to Terran pressure, and it slowly but surely becomes less Darkovan.

=== Fate ===
In The Shattered Chain there is a brief mention, or appeal, to the theme of fate. In later books, both Darkovan and not Darkovan, Bradley explores her ideas in greater depth. In The Shattered Chain, Peter Haldane, a Terran, looks exactly like Rohana Ardais's son, except for the lack of a sixth finger. When attempting Haldane's rescue, disguised as a Renunciate on Rohana's advice, Magdalen Lorne meets Jaelle, who is a Renunciate and Rohana's niece. Jaelle is the one person who can expose Magda as a fake, because Magda claims to have the same oath-mother, which Jaelle knows is a lie. The remedy for masquerading as a Renunciate is to take the Renunciate's oath and make the lie come true. Rohana does not think this is all coincidence; Bradley suggests there is a higher power at work.

Bradley often implied that fate is at work when a character uses the Darkovan proverb, "The world will go as it will, not as you or I will have it", which appears in nearly all the Darkover books.

== Consistency ==
Bradley said, in A Darkover Retrospective, that she did not really like "series books". She also claimed, "I am simply not up to the kind of planning and long-range forethought that a "series" demands", such as Robert A. Heinlein's Future History series. She mentioned a fellow novelist who has a grand scheme worked out for 2000 years into the future, and every book must fit into the scheme. She thought that is "horrible".

Bradley said: "So these are the ground rules for the Darkover books, series or not; every one is complete in itself, and I do not assume that the reader has read, or will ever read, any other book in the series". As an example of what she avoided, Bradley cited Roger Zelazny's Amber series, which led her to believe that it was soon to be resolved when she was reading it, but then it wasn't. Another example is the cliffhanger ending of one of Edgar Rice Burroughs's Barsoom books, "where at the very end of the book the heroine ... was stolen away and popped into some kind of giant wheel with cubicles which moved at a fixed rate" and "John Carter and his sidekick were left staring at the giant wheel until the next book". (Note: The book Bradley describes is The Gods of Mars, the second Barsoom book.)

"Also", Bradley said, "... whenever consistency from book to book threatens to impair the artistic unity of any single book as a unit in itself, inter-book consistency will be relentlessly sacrificed... If I perpetuate anything in a Darkover book which I think could be altered for the better, I simply write it in the next book the way I think it ought to have been all along... I can't imagine why readers should be bothered by this kind of thing".

In "A Note from the Author", published with Sharra's Exile, Bradley said that she wrote the novels "as they occurred to me" instead of in "strict chronological order" and that, as a result, the chronologically earlier novels were written after the later ones, and were more mature. When she wrote The Heritage of Hastur she decided she would not be "locked into" the immature concepts of The Sword of Aldones, which she had "dreamed up at the age of fifteen". She rewrote it as Sharra's Exile.

Although the books written between 1958 and 1995 were intended to be stand-alone stories in accord with Bradley's "ground rules", with the publication of Exile's Song the story was continued from book to book with The Shadow Matrix and Traitor's Sun. Adrienne Martine-Barnes was the uncredited co-author of these books. The dedication of the ebook edition of Exile's Song say "For Adrienne Martine-Barnes, who created the character Margaret Alton, and worked on this book with me"; furthermore, the copyright page of the ebook editions of The Shadow Matrix and Traitor's Sun both list Adrienne Martine-Barnes as co-copyright holder, along with Ms. Bradley. (Note: A number of websites make this claim, or claim that Martine-Barnes was the sole author.) This broke Bradley's "ground rules". Bradley was at that time approaching the end of her life; she died in 1999, the same year that the third book of this "trilogy" was published.

Despite the ground rules, the books "The Shattered Chain", "Thendara House" and "City of Sorcery" are a series telling the story of Jaelle n'ha Melora aka Jaelle Aillard, and the story of Magdalen Lorne, aka Margali n'ha Ysabet. And as mentioned before, "Sharra's Exile" is a sequel to "The Heritage of Hastur".

== Chronology ==
This Darkover chronology uses the time period designations first provided by the author as "A Readers Guide to Darkover" in The Heirs of Hammerfell (1989). Some of these time periods overlap, particularly the Ages of Chaos and the Hundred Kingdoms eras. It is occasionally the case that the official readers guide places a book in one era, but internal plot evidence places it in another (or both). Additionally, Bradley was not particularly sympathetic to her fans' need to organize the books into a consistent chronology, and the timeline evidence from one book to another is sometimes in conflict. Commenting on this problem, Bradley wrote, "I have fiercely resisted any attempt to impose absolute consistency, straightforward chronology, or anything but the most superficial order on the chronicles of Darkover". Furthermore, in the introduction to the "Between the Ages" section of Sword of Chaos, Bradley conceded, "chronology in the Darkover novels was never my strong point anyway", after humorously quoting an old rhyme about a centipede who did not know "which leg moved after which".

Bradley herself recommended that the books be read in the order in which they were written, rather than the Darkovan chronological order, as her writing style changed considerably over her career.

In The Planet Savers, Jason Allison says that the city of Carthon is 5000 years old (pg. 24). In Darkover Landfall, the final sentence suggests that 2000 years elapsed between the colonization and rediscovery by the Terran Empire. In Sharra's Exile, published in 1981, Lew Alton says, in the Prologue, "Travel among the stars has strange anomalies; the enormous interstellar distances play strange tricks with time... The elapsed time on Terra was something like three thousand years. Yet elapsed time on Darkover was somehow more like ten thousand..." This is but one example of inconsistency.

=== The Founding ===
At the end of the 21st century, Earth sends colony ships out to the stars. One of these ships becomes disabled and crash-lands on Darkover, the fourth planet in a red giant solar system. Unable to repair their ship and equally unable to make contact with Earth, the survivors establish a colony.

The colonists are primarily Celts and Spaniards, and this mix is reflected in the resultant blended culture. Bradley used a standard "lost colony" trope: to maintain the available gene pool and maximize the chances of colonial survival, the colonists intermarry extensively and produce as many children with as many different partners as possible. Psychic and psionic abilities are acquired through interbreeding with the indigenous people, the Chieri.

Bradley is silent about the developments that followed the first generation of the colony, and does not make clear how many years intervene between the founding and the Ages of Chaos. The novels Darkover Landfall and Rediscovery suggest that at least 2000 years have passed between the founding of the colony and Earth's recontact. The last sentence of "Darkover Landfall" states, "But Earth knew nothing of them for 2,000 years", but as Lew Alton says (above) the time on Darkover was perhaps 10,000 years.

Books describing this era:

- Darkover Landfall (1972) – the first of the series, though not the first story published.
- Arilinn (2024), written by Deborah J. Ross

Short stories describing this era:

- "Vai Dom", Diana L. Paxson, The Keeper's Price
- "The Forest", Cynthia McQuillin, The Keeper's Price
- "A Gift of Love", Diana L. Paxson, Sword of Chaos
- "The Tower at New Skye", Priscilla W. Armstrong, Leroni of Darkover

=== The Ages of Chaos ===
Bradley's books constantly refer back to the Ages of Chaos, but few books are actually set in this era. In this era, the descendants of the original colonists have organized themselves into a feudal-type society, with laran (psionic) abilities as the determiner of which individuals are part of the aristocracy and which are commoners. This period is marked by incredible creativity, the development of laran-based technology and weaponry, and the creation of the system of Towers, where those with exceptional laran abilities are housed and trained. All of these dominate political and social life, but these developments are accompanied by a period of nearly constant civil war, in which the Darkovans seem determined to exterminate themselves. Walter Breen's The Darkover Concordance indicates that the Ages of Chaos period begins about a thousand years after the colonization of the planet and lasts a full thousand years.

Books describing this era:

- Stormqueen! (1978 - by Marion Zimmer Bradley)
- Thunderlord! (2016 - by Deborah J. Ross)

=== The Hundred Kingdoms ===
Many of Bradley's books, and a large number of the short stories, are set at the tail end of the Ages of Chaos, in a period she called the Hundred Kingdoms. The distinction between The Ages of Chaos and The Hundred Kingdoms is not well-defined, creating controversies about the chronology. By this era, the laran breeding programs had been abandoned, and the many small principalities were beginning to consolidate into the seven domains that survived into Darkover's modern era. Bradley's innovation, the adoption of "The Compact", is a turning point in the development of Darkover's social order. The Compact, promulgated by the recurring historical character Varzil the Good, bans all weapons that can be used without bringing the user into equal danger, effectively banning laran weapons, but allowing swords and knives. The Hundred Kingdoms may be read as commentary on the use of weapons of mass destruction in Earth's own endless conflicts.

Books describing this era:

- The Fall of Neskaya (2001 - with Deborah J. Ross), book one of the Clingfire Trilogy
- Hawkmistress! (1982)
- Zandru's Forge (2003 - with Deborah J. Ross), coincides with Hawkmistress!, book two of the Clingfire Trilogy
- Two To Conquer (1980)
- A Flame in Hali (2004 - with Deborah J. Ross), book three of the Clingfire Trilogy
- The Heirs of Hammerfell (1989)

=== Recontact (Against the Terrans: The First Age) ===
Eventually Darkover is rediscovered by the Terran Empire, which establishes a spaceport, first at Caer Donn, and later at Thendara, the only large city on Darkover. This re-contact takes place a little more than 2,000 years after the events described in Darkover Landfall.

Books describing this era:

- Rediscovery (1993 - with Mercedes Lackey)
- The Spell Sword (1974)
- The Shattered Chain (1976)
- The Forbidden Tower (1977), nominated for a Hugo Award
- Thendara House (1983 - with Jacqueline Lichtenberg, uncredited)
- City of Sorcery (1984)
- Star of Danger (1965)
- The Winds of Darkover (1970)

=== After the Comyn (Against the Terrans: The Second Age) ===
Books describing this era:

- The Bloody Sun (1964, revised 1979)
- The Heritage of Hastur (1975), nominated for a Nebula Award
- The Planet Savers (1962)
- Sharra's Exile (1981), rewrite of and official replacement of The Sword of Aldones from 1962 that was nominated for a Hugo Award.
- The World Wreckers (1971)
- Hastur Lord (2010 - written by Deborah J. Ross)
- Exile's Song (1996 - with Adrienne Martine-Barnes)
- The Shadow Matrix (1998 - with Adrienne Martine-Barnes)
- Traitor's Sun (1999 - with Adrienne Martine-Barnes) (Note: As noted above, some sources say that Adrienne Martine-Barnes was the sole author of the latter three books.)

=== Modern Darkover ===
At the conclusion of Traitor's Sun, Bradley describes the Terrans abandoning their foothold on Darkover, and the restoration of Comyn control over the government. Books after Traitor's Sun therefore fall in their own category, which the publisher is calling Modern Darkover.

- The Alton Gift (2007 - written by Deborah J. Ross)
- The Children of Kings (2013 - written by Deborah J. Ross)
- The Laran Gambit (2022 - written by Deborah J. Ross)

=== The Renunciates ===
In the introduction to Free Amazons of Darkover, Bradley wrote that her Renunciates have become "the most attractive and controversial of my creations". The Guild of Oath-Bound Renunciates, called Free Amazons and com'hi letzii in earlier books, were women who had opted out of Darkover's traditional gender-based roles, including marriage, obligations to clan, and the expectation of male protection.

The origins of this guild during the Hundred Kingdoms era are described in Two to Conquer as the merger between the Sisterhood of the Sword, a military-mercenary guild, and the Priestesses of Avarra, a cloistered order that offered medical and other care to women, primarily abused women. Towards the end of Two to Conquer, Carlina di Asturien comes to believe that the two guilds need to work together for the benefit of all women on Darkover. Bradley acknowledged a Patricia Matthews fan story as the origin of the Sisterhood of the Sword, and described the Priesthood of Avarra as a counterforce.

Bradley noted that most of the fan fiction she received was inspired by the Renunciates, that she had met individuals who had taken Renunciate-style names or were attempting to live in women's communes inspired by the Renunciate guildhouses.

Books in the world of the Renunciates:

- The Shattered Chain (1976) (reprinted as Oath of The Renunciates, the 1983 omnibus of The Shattered Chain and Thendara House)
- Thendara House (1983) (reprinted as Oath of The Renunciates, the 1983 omnibus of The Shattered Chain and Thendara House)
- City of Sorcery (1984) (reprinted as Oath of The Renunciates, the 2002 omnibus of The Shattered Chain, Thendara House, and City of Sorcery)

=== Darkover anthologies ===
In addition to novels, Bradley edited and published twelve short story anthologies in collaboration with other authors, known as the Friends of Darkover. The period of cooperative collaboration, which started in 1970, ended abruptly in 1992, when Bradley's interaction with a fan rendered the novel Contraband legally unpublishable. The anthologies are now out of print owing to the publisher's concerns regarding the ownership of the copyrights of the individual stories.

The stories in the anthologies stand apart from the novels and do not necessarily fit into the chronology above.

In the 1990 anthology, Domains of Darkover, Bradley stated that the only short stories that she considered part of the official Darkover canon, were those by herself, Diana L. Paxson and Elisabeth Waters, and a single story by Patricia Floss, The Other Side of the Mirror. All of the other short stories published either in the anthologies or in fanzines she considered unofficial.

- The Keeper's Price (1980)
- Sword of Chaos (1982)
- Free Amazons of Darkover (1985)
- The Other Side of the Mirror (1987)
- Red Sun of Darkover (1987)
- Four Moons of Darkover (1987)
- Domains of Darkover (1990)
- Renunciates of Darkover (1991)
- Leroni of Darkover (1991)
- Towers of Darkover (1993)
- Marion Zimmer Bradley's Darkover (1993), includes To Keep the Oath
- Snows of Darkover (1994)

The publication of the anthologies of Darkover was restarted in 2013.

- Music of Darkover (2013)
- Stars of Darkover (2014)
- Gifts of Darkover (2015)
- Realms of Darkover (2016)
- Masques of Darkover (2017)
- Crossroads of Darkover (2018)
- Citadels of Darkover (2019)
- Jewels of Darkover (2023)

== Proposed TV series ==
A TV series based on the Darkover books was announced in 2012, and was to be produced by Ilene Kahn Power and Elizabeth Stanley. In 2018, Deborah J. Ross, co-writer with Marion Zimmer Bradley on several Darkover novels and editor of related anthologies, stated that the proposed series has been scrapped.

== See also ==
- Darkover (board game), a board game based on the books
