= The Spell Sword =

1974 novel by Marion Zimmer Bradley

- Cover of the first edition
- Author: Marion Zimmer Bradley
- Cover artist: George Barr
- Language: English
- Series: Darkover
- Genre: Sword and planet
- Publisher: DAW Books
- Publication date: 1974
- Publication place: United States
- Media type: Print (paperback)
- Pages: 158
- OCLC: 156484864
- Preceded by: The Shattered Chain
- Followed by: The Forbidden Tower

The Spell Sword is a sword and planet novel by American writer Marion Zimmer Bradley, part of the Darkover series. The book was co-authored by Paul Edwin Zimmer, Bradley's brother, though he was not credited. The Spell Sword was first published in paperback by DAW in 1974 (OCLC 156484864) and has been republished several times.

This book is the first in a trilogy within the Darkover series dealing with the evolution of Towers and Keepers. The sequels are The Forbidden Tower (1977) and The Bloody Sun (1979), which takes place many decades later. In "Author's Notes on Chronology", Bradley states that in her view, The Spell Sword occurs about thirty years before Star of Danger.

== Plot summary ==
Andrew Carr is employed as a technician in the Empire's Mapping and Exploration survey of Cottman IV, known locally as Darkover. His survey plane encounters a storm over the mountains and crashes. Carr survives through the intervention of a diaphanous figure that he initially believes to be a ghost. She tells him her name is Callista, a Keeper, and she is communicating with him through the Overworld. Carr believes none of this, but follows her directions to shelter.

Meanwhile, on the road to Armida, Damon Ridenow discusses recent violent conflicts with a native species called the cat-men with his guardsmen. Ridenow is a matrix technician who was recently dismissed by Leonie Hastur, Keeper of Arilinn, on the grounds that he is "too sensitive".

During the journey, the group is attacked by an unseen entity. Only Damon Ridenow survives. He arrives at Armida to find that it, too, has been attacked, and Callista Lanart was kidnapped. Her twin, Ellemir Lanart, assures him Callista is alive because she can feel her sister's telepathic presence, though they cannot communicate directly.

Damon ventures into the Overworld to seek Callista, but finds only a "great darkness" and a vaguely evil presence. Meanwhile, Andrew Carr arrives at the door seeking shelter and assistance. He mistakes Ellemir for Callista. After introductions and food, Andrew describes his experiences. Damon concludes Callista is being held by the cat-men.

Ellemir's father, Esteban Lanart, Lord Alton, arrives with his guard. His party has also been attacked by an invisible enemy, and Lord Alton was gravely wounded. Damon uses his laran abilities to save one of the wounded guards, but can do nothing for Lord Alton, who is permanently paralyzed.

The next day, Lord Alton is informed of the situation, and Damon Ridenow tells him he wants to marry Ellemir. Alton approves Damon's suit, but disapproves of Andrew Carr's interest in Callista because she is a Keeper.

Damon says he will attempt to rescue Callista. Lord Alton suggests he use his Alton gift of forced rapport so that he can provide Damon with his own superior sword skills, which Damon lacks. After testing this theory and mounting a small matrix jewel in the hilt of his sword, Damon leaves for the darkening lands and the Caves of Corresanti. They engage the cat-men in several small skirmishes along the way.

At Armida, Andrew Carr has learned how to enter the Overworld, and locates Callista. Desperate to help her, he somehow manages to teleport himself into the caves. Andrew and Callista make their way through the caves with Damon and face off against the Great Cat, a larger cat with a powerful matrix jewel. The matrix is destroyed, and everyone returns to Armida.

Callista, the Keeper who is sworn to lifelong virginity, contemplates giving up her vows to be with Andrew.

== Major characters ==
- Andrew Carr, Terranan
- Damon Ridenow, a matrix technician
- Callista Lanart, a matrix technician and keeper-nominate of Arilinn
- Ellemir Lanart, Callista's twin
- Leonie Hastur, Keeper of Arilinn
- Esteban Lanart, Lord Alton, master of Armida, father of Callista and Ellemir

== Inconsistencies with later books in the series ==
- The Terran Empire is called the Federation in subsequent books.
- The telepathic focals which were called starstones in early books are also referred to as matrix stones. The term starstone disappears in later books and matrix is used exclusively.
- Esteban Lanart is the Lord of Alton, master of Armida and head of the Alton Clan. His descendants are called Lanart-Alton.

== Publication history ==
- 1974, US, DAW Books OCLC 156484864, pub date September 1974, paperback
- 1979, US, Gregg Press ISBN 0-8398-2503-X, pub date February 1979, hardcover
- 1987, UK, Arrow Books ISBN 0-09-915950-3, pub date October 1987, paperback
- 1990, UK, Severn House ISBN 0-7278-4046-0, pub date May 1990, hardcover
- 2000, US, GK Hall & Company ISBN 0-7838-9066-4, pub date June 2000, large print edition

== Sources ==
- Brown, Charles N.; William G. Contento (November 20, 2007). "The Locus Index to Science Fiction (1984–1998)".
- Jaffery, Sheldon (1987). Future and Fantastic Worlds. Mercer Island, Washington: Starmont House. pp. 41–42. ISBN 1-55742-002-5.
- Adapted from the Wikinfo article The Spell Sword, licensed under the GNU Free Documentation License.
- The Spell Sword title listing at the Internet Speculative Fiction Database
