= Dorothy J. Heydt =

American novelist (1942–2022)

- Born: 1942
- Died: June 28, 2022 (aged 80); Vallejo, California, U.S.
- Occupation: Writer
- Writing career
- Pen name: Katherine Blake
- Genres: Science fiction, Fantasy
- Website: www.kithrup.com/~djheydt/index.html

Dorothy Jones Heydt (1942 – June 28, 2022) was an American author of science fiction and fantasy. She lived on the U.S. West Coast and was an active participant in the Usenet newsgroups rec.arts.sf.written and rec.arts.sf.fandom, and in science fiction fandom in general. She was the originator of the "Eight Deadly Words" ("I don't care what happens to these people"), and other fan quotes. She was the originator and first editor of the Star Trek Concordance, an extensive resource guide first published in March 1969.

A linguist, she invented one of the first widely used Vulcan conlangs in 1967 for a Star Trek fan fiction series. Its words were picked up and used by other fan fiction authors such as Claire Gabriel. One term, ni var, (Note: "Ni var means literally 'two form', and it is basically a piece comparing and contrasting two different things or two aspects of the same thing.") is still used on Star Trek: Enterprise as the name of a Vulcan ship and on Star Trek: Discovery as the new name of the planet Vulcan itself.

Heydt wrote numerous short stories and two novels; she sometimes wrote as "Katherine Blake." Many of her stories appeared in collections edited by Marion Zimmer Bradley, including the Sword and Sorceress series, and stories in the Darkover series shared world. Marion Zimmer Bradley's Fantasy Magazine published many of her stories.

While not one of the founding members of the Society for Creative Anachronism, she did participate in the early years and helped establish important elements of the ceremonies, such as the oath of fealty used in peerage ceremonies.

Dorothy Heydt died on June 28, 2022, at the age of 80.

== Selected works ==
- The Interior Life, as Katherine Blake. Baen Books (1990), ISBN 0671720104
- A Point of Honor. Daw Books (1998) ISBN 0886777917
