= 1815 in literature =

This article presents lists of the literary events and publications in 1815.

== Events ==
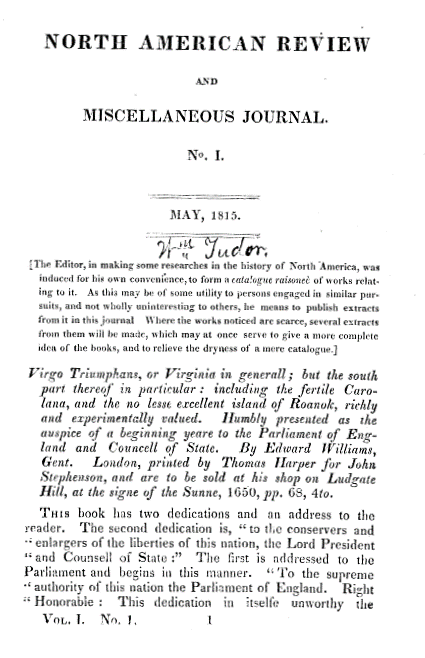
First issue of the North American Review with signature of its editor William Tudor.

- January 2 – Lord Byron marries Annabella Milbanke at Seaham, County Durham. To escape from his growing debts and the rumours circulating about him, Byron has pressed in his determination to marry Annabella, who is said to be the likely heiress of a rich uncle. Their daughter, Ada, is born in December 1815. However, Byron's continuing obsession with his paternal half-sister Augusta Leigh, and his continuing sexual escapades with various actresses, such as Charlotte Mardyn, make their marital life a misery.
- April 7 – Lord Byron and Walter Scott meet for the first time, in the offices of publisher John Murray, 50 Albemarle Street in London.
- May – First publication of the North American Review, the first literary magazine in the United States. It is founded in Boston by the poet William Tudor with the assistance of the journalist Nathan Hale and others. It is published continuously until 1940, after which it is inactive until revived at Cornell College in Iowa under Robert Dana in 1964. From 1968, the University of Northern Iowa in Cedar Falls is home to the publication.
- June 15 – The Duchess of Richmond's ball is held in Brussels on the night before the Battle of Quatre Bras (and three nights before the Battle of Waterloo) by Charlotte, Duchess of Richmond for her son, the writer Lord William Lennox. It subsequently features in literary works by Lord Byron, William Makepeace Thackeray, Charles Lever, Georgette Heyer, Bernard Cornwell and Julian Fellowes.
- December 23
  - Jane Austen's novel Emma is published anonymously by John Murray in London dated 1816. About 1500 copies sell over the next 5 years.
  - Polish scholar and adventurer Count Jan Potocki, believing that he is becoming a werewolf, shoots himself with a silver bullet, leaving his novel The Manuscript Found in Saragossa incomplete.
- Thomas Love Peacock's first novel Headlong Hall is published anonymously by Thomas Hookham in London, dated 1816.
- First complete publication of the Old English epic poem Beowulf, in a Latin translation by Icelandic-Danish scholar Grímur Jónsson Thorkelin.
- The second volume of the first edition of the Brothers Grimm's Grimms' Fairy Tales is dated this year but published late in 1814.

== New books ==
=== Fiction ===
- Jane Austen (anonymously) – Emma (dated 1816)
- Sarah Green – The Fugitive
- Ann Hatton ("Ann of Swansea") – Secret Avengers
- Mary Hays – The Brothers, or Consequences
- E. T. A. Hoffmann – The Devil's Elixirs (Die Elixiere des Teufels)
- Barbara Hofland – A Father as He Should Be
- Christian Isobel Johnstone (anonymously) – Clan-Albin: A National Tale
- Elizabeth Meeke ("Mrs Meeke") – Spanish Campaigns, or The Jew
- Thomas Love Peacock (anonymously) – Headlong Hall (dated 1816)
- Jane Porter – The Pastor's Fireside
- Regina Marie Roche – Edinburg; a Novel
- Walter Scott (anonymously) – Guy Mannering
- Catharina Smith – Barozzi; or, The Venetian Sorceress
- Thomas Skinner Surr – The Magic of Wealth

=== Children and young people ===
- Arabella Argus – The Adventures of a Donkey

=== Drama ===
- Barbarina Brand – Ina, a tragedy in five acts
- Bernhard Severin Ingemann – Blanca
- James Sheridan Knowles – Caius Gracchus
- Jane Scott – The Gipsy Girl
- Eugène Scribe and Delestre Poirson – Une Nuit de la Garde nationale

=== Poetry ===
- Pierre-Jean de Béranger – Chansons I
- Lord Byron – Hebrew Melodies
- Walter Scott – The Field of Waterloo
- Percy Bysshe Shelley – Alastor, or The Spirit of Solitude
- William Wordsworth – The White Doe of Rylstone

=== Non-fiction ===
- Simón Bolívar – Letter to Jamaica (September 6)
- Alexander von Humboldt – Personal Narrative of Travels to the Equinoctial Regions of the New Continent during the Years 1799–1804 (first edition in French, seven volumes up to 1826)
- Les Jeux des Jeunes Garçons
- John Malcolm – The History of Persia, from the Most Early Period to the Present Time
- Thomas Malthus – An Inquiry into the Nature and Progress of Rent

== Births ==
- January 7 – E. Louisa Mather, American writer (died 1882)
- February 19 – Elizabeth Missing Sewell, English novelist and educationist (died 1906)
- April 24 – Anthony Trollope, English novelist (died 1882)
- April 25 – Richard William Church, English biographer and cleric (died 1890)
- May 5 – Eugène Marin Labiche, French dramatist (died 1888)
- June 6 – Giovanni Peruzzini, Italian poet, opera librettist, and translator of German literature (died 1869)
- July 17 – Thekla Knös, Swedish poet (died 1880)
- August 1 – Marițica Bibescu, Wallachian poet and literary patron (died 1859)
- October 4 – Franz Jakob Clemens, German philosopher (died 1862)
- November 5 – Martins Pena, Brazilian dramatist (died 1848)
- November 17 – Eliza Farnham, American novelist and reformer (died 1864)
- December 10 – Augusta Ada King (née Byron), Countess of Lovelace, English mathematician and writer on computing (died 1852)
- December 20 – James Legge, Scottish sinologist, missionary and translator (died 1897)
- unknown date – Meenakshi Sundaram Pillai, Tamil scholar and poet (died 1876)

== Deaths ==
- January 21 – Matthias Claudius (Asmus), German poet (born 1740)
- January 30 – Hans Christian Amberg, Danish lexicographer (born 1749)
- March 4 – Frances Abington, née Barton, English actress (born 1737)
- April 13 – Thomas Bayly Howell, English legal writer (born 1767)
- September 13 – Mihály Gáber, Slovene writer in Hungary (born c. 1753)
- November 2 – Gottlieb Christoph Harless, German bibliographer (born 1738)
- November 11 – Pierre-Louis Ginguené, French writer and critic (born 1748)
- November 17 – Dorothea Viehmann, German fairy-story teller (born 1755)
- December 20 – Giovanni Meli, Sicilian poet (born 1740)
- December 23 – Jan Potocki, Polish polymath (born 1761)

== Sources ==
- McGann, Jerome (2013) [2004]. "Byron, George Gordon Noel (1788–1824)". Oxford Dictionary of National Biography (online ed.). Oxford University Press. doi:10.1093/ref:odnb/4279. (Subscription, Wikipedia Library access or UK public library membership required.)
