= 1882 in literature =

This article contains information about the literary events and publications of 1882.

== Events ==
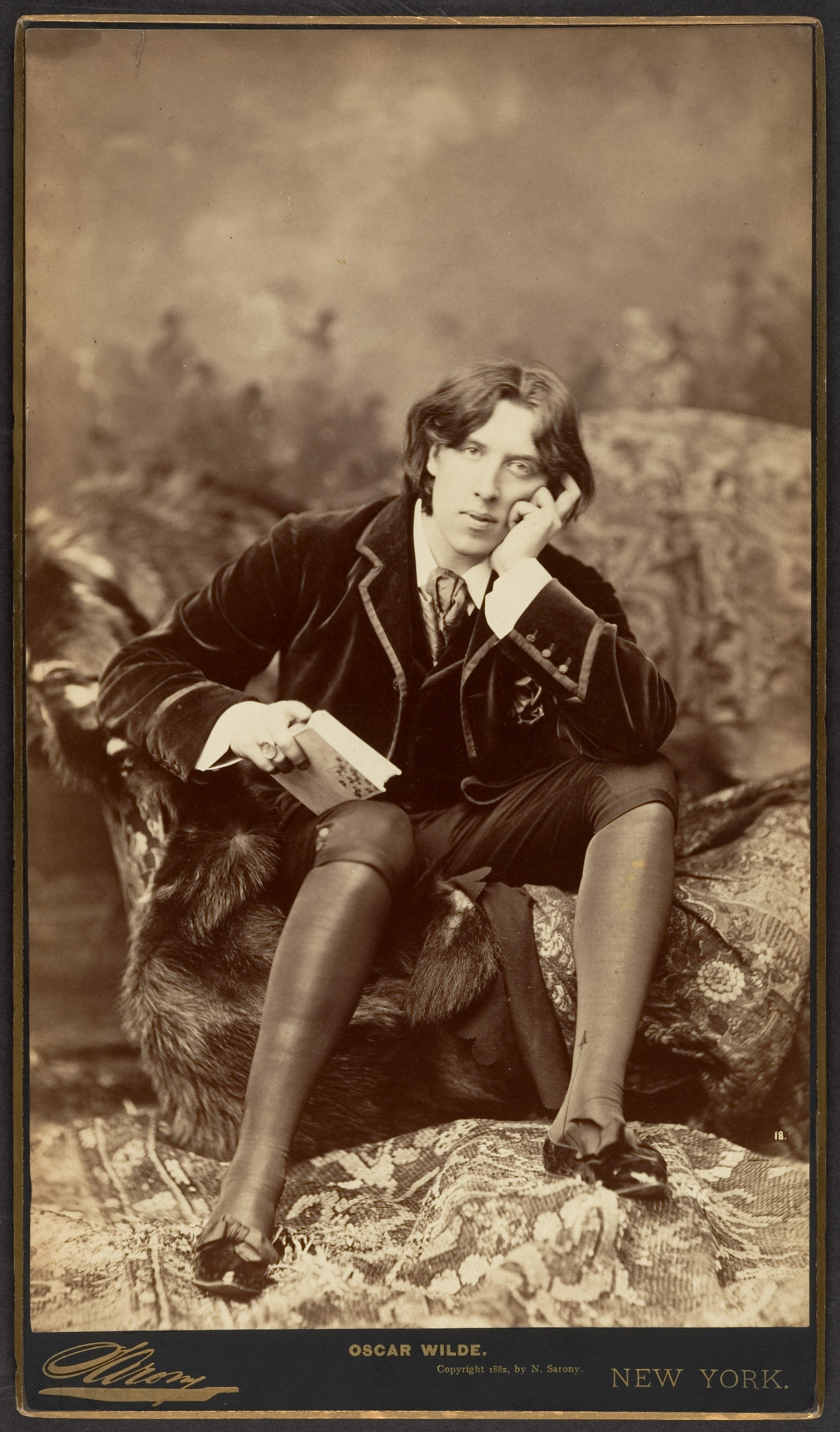
Napoleon Sarony's portrait of Oscar Wilde

- January 2 – Oscar Wilde arrives in the United States for an extended lecture tour sponsored by Richard D'Oyly Carte. A few days later he poses for iconic photographs in Napoleon Sarony's Manhattan studio.
- April 9 – English poet and artist Dante Gabriel Rossetti dies aged 53 of Bright's disease at Birchington-on-Sea in the care of his brother, the critic William Michael Rossetti.
- April 29 – May 6 (O. S.: April 17–24) – The Romanian poet Mihai Eminescu reads out his Luceafărul at two successive meetings of Junimea club in Iași. The poem, on which he had been working since 1873, is his last major work before his mental health collapses, requiring hospital care in Oberdöbling; it will be published in April 1883.
- May 8 – World première of David Belasco's La Belle Russe in New York City
- May 20 – World première of Henrik Ibsen's controversial play Ghosts (Gengangere; 1881) in Norwegian in Chicago.
- June 2 – English language première of Ibsen's play A Doll's House (1879) as The Child Wife in Milwaukee.
- October
  - Almqvist & Wiksell is established in Uppsala (Sweden) by purchase of an earlier printing company.
  - Rudyard Kipling returns to the British Raj and joins the staff of the Civil and Military Gazette in Lahore.
- December – Karl May (as Captain Ramon Diaz de la Escosura) begins to publish Das Waldröschen in installments.
- unknown date – In Delhi, the first original novel in Hindi is published: Pariksha guru (Parīkṣāguru, "Experience is the Only Teacher") by Srinivas Das (Śrīnivāsdās).

== New books ==
=== Fiction ===
- F. Anstey – Vice Versa
- Jules Barbey d'Aurevilly – The Story Without a Name
- Walter Besant – The Revolt of Man
- Rolf Boldrewood – Robbery Under Arms (serialization in The Sydney Mail begins, July)
- Félicien Champsaur – Dinah Samuel
- Bankim Chatterjee – Anandmath
- Wilkie Collins – After Dark (short stories)
- Gabriele D'Annunzio – Terra vergine (short stories)
- Etonensis (George Augustus Sala and James Campbell Reddie) – The Mysteries of Verbena House, or, Miss Bellasis Birched for Thieving
- Theodor Fontane – L'Adultera (The Adulteress)
- Karl Adolph Gjellerup – Germanernes Lærling (The Germans' Apprentice)
- Ludovic Halévy – The Abbot Constantine
- Richard Jefferies – Bevis
- Alexander Kielland – Skipper Worse
- George Bernard Shaw – Cashel Byron's Profession
- Robert Louis Stevenson – New Arabian Nights
- Frank R. Stockton – "The Lady, or the Tiger?" (short story in The Century Magazine, November)
- Torfhildur Þorsteinsdóttir (Hólm) – Brynjólfur Sveinsson biskup
- Anthony Trollope – The Fixed Period
- Gleb Uspensky – The Power of the Land («Власть земли», in Otechestvennye Zapiski, 1–2, and book publication)
- Jules Verne
  - Godfrey Morgan: A Californian Mystery (L'École des Robinsons)
  - The Green Ray (Le Rayon vert)

=== Children and young people ===
- R. D. Blackmore – Christowell
- Mrs. W. K. Clifford – Anyhow Stories, Moral and Otherwise
- Ouida – Bimbi: Stories for Children
- Mark Twain – The Prince and the Pauper

=== Drama ===
- David Belasco - La Belle Russe
- Manilal Dwivedi – Kanta
- José Echegaray – Conflicto entre dos deberes (Conflict of Duties)
- Victor Hugo – Torquemada
- Henrik Ibsen – An Enemy of the People (En folkefiende)
- Victorien Sardou – Fédora
- R. L. Stevenson and W. E. Henley – Deacon Brodie
- Jules Verne – Journey Through the Impossible (Voyage à travers l'impossible)

=== Poetry ===
- Gabriele D'Annunzio – Canto novo
- George Robert Sims – The Dagonet Ballads

=== Non-fiction ===
- Henri-Frédéric Amiel (died 1881) – Journal intime
- Hall Caine – Recollections of Rossetti
- Ignatius L. Donnelly – Atlantis: The Antediluvian World
- William Morris – Hopes and Fears for Art
- Friedrich Nietzsche – The Gay Science (Die fröhliche Wissenschaft)
- Theodore Roosevelt – The Naval War of 1812
- Janez Trdina – Bajke in povesti o Gorjancih (Tales and Stories of the Gorjanci Mountains)

== Births ==
- January 10 – Olive Higgins Prouty, American novelist (died 1974)
- January 18 – A. A. Milne, English fiction writer, particularly for children (died 1956)
- January 25 – Virginia Woolf, English novelist (died 1941)
- February 1 – Cicely Fox Smith, English poet and nautical writer (died 1954)
- February 2 – James Joyce, Irish novelist and poet (died 1941)
- February 14 – George Jean Nathan, American literary critic (died 1958)
- March 5 – Henry S. Whitehead, American author (died 1932)
- April 18 – Monteiro Lobato, Brazilian fiction writer, particularly for children (died 1948)
- May 20 – Sigrid Undset, Norwegian author (died 1949)
- May 28 – Avery Hopwood, American playwright (died 1928)
- May 30 – Ivan Sokolov-Mikitov, Russian novelist (died 1975)
- September 4 – Leonhard Frank, German writer (died 1961)
- September 12 – Ion Agârbiceanu, Austro-Hungarian-born Romanian writer (died 1963)
- September 17 – Darrell Figgis, Irish writer and politician (suicide 1925)
- October 28 – Richard Barham Middleton, English poet and fiction writer (died 1911)
- November 2 – Leo Perutz, Austrian-born novelist and mathematician (died 1957)
- November 18 – Wyndham Lewis, British novelist (died 1957)
- November 24 – E. R. Eddison, English fantasy author (died 1945)
- December 13 – André Billy, French author (died 1971)

== Deaths ==
- January 3 – William Harrison Ainsworth, English historical novelist (born 1805)
- January 6 – Richard Henry Dana Jr., American novelist and politician (born 1815)
- February 5 – E. Louisa Mather, American writer n (born 1815)
- March 20 – Charlotte Chanter, English botanical writer and novelist (born 1828)
- March 24 – Henry Wadsworth Longfellow, American poet (born 1807)
- April 10 – Dante Gabriel Rossetti, English poet and painter (Bright's disease, born 1828)
- April 27 – Ralph Waldo Emerson, American poet, essayist and philosopher (born 1803)
- June 14 – Thomas Cautley Newby, English publisher (born c.1797)
- June 30 – Charles J. Guiteau, American writer and lawyer, assassin of United States President James A. Garfield (born 1841)
- August 1 – Henry Kendall, Australian poet (born 1839)
- October 13 – Arthur de Gobineau, French novelist (born 1816)
- December 6 – Anthony Trollope, English novelist (born 1815)
