= Daily Grind =

Daily Grind may refer to:

- The Daily Grind (EP), a 1993 EP by punk rock band No Use for a Name
- A slang term for employment
- A slang term for coffee preparation
- A song by Little Feat from the 1990 album Representing the Mambo
- A webcomic by American author Michael H. Payne
