= Gleb Uspensky =

Russian writer and public intellectual (1843–1902)

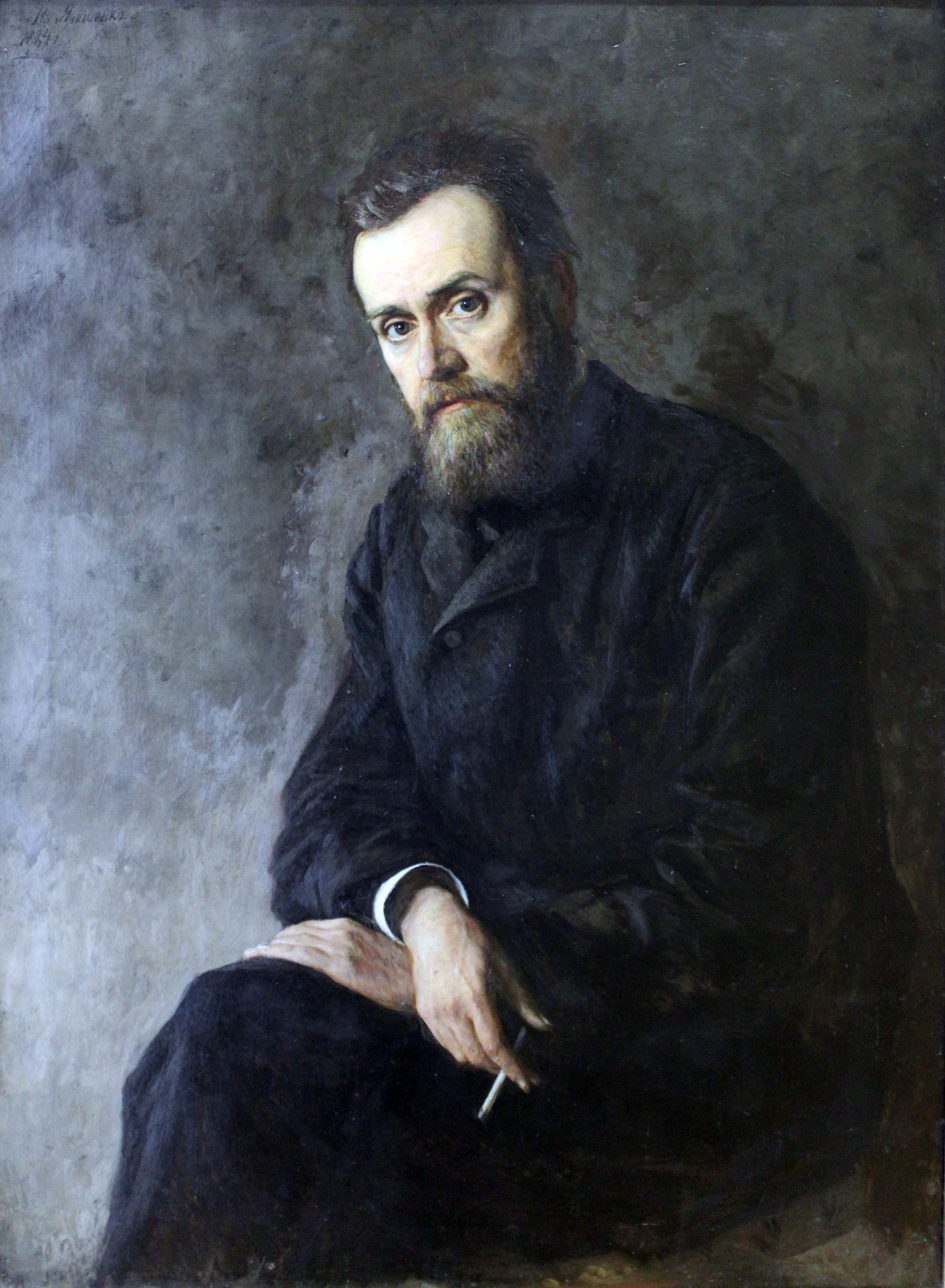
- Portrait of Uspensky, 1884
- Born: October 25, 1843; Tula, Russian Empire
- Died: April 6, 1902 (aged 58); St. Petersburg, Russian Empire
- Relatives: Nikolay Uspensky
- Writing career
- Period: 1860s–1890s
- Genre: Fiction/journalism

Signature
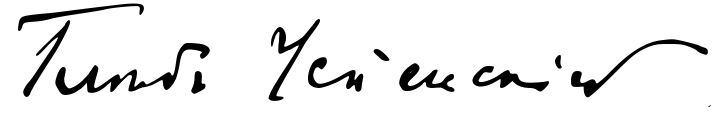

Gleb Ivanovich Uspensky (Russian: Глеб Иванович Успенский; October 25, 1843 – April 6, 1902) was a Russian writer and a prominent figure of the Narodnik movement.

== Biography ==
=== Early life ===
Gleb Uspensky was born in Tula, the son of Ivan Yakovlevich Uspensky, a senior official in the local government Office of State Property, and Nadezhda Glebovna Uspenskaya (née Sokolova). He was named after his grandfather on his mother's side, Gleb Fomich Sokolov who served as the head of the Office of State Property in Tula (up until 1848) and Kaluga (from 1848 onwards). Gleb Uspensky received his early education in the homes of his parents and grandfather. In 1853 Gleb entered the Tula gymnasium where he excelled, "his name never leaving the so-called 'golden desk' there", according to a fellow student's memoirs. In 1856 he moved with his family to Chernigov. While studying in the local gymnasium, Uspensky devoted much of his time to reading the Russian classics and participated in the school's literary almanac "Young Stems".

In September 1861 he enrolled in the Law Faculty at Saint Petersburg University, only to be expelled three months later as the university temporarily closed due to student unrest. In 1862 he entered Moscow University but soon left due to a lack of money. Ivan Uspensky's death on January 9, 1864, left Gleb with the added responsibility of supporting his family. He travelled back to Chernigov and succeeded in getting a grant of 400 rubles in assistance.

=== Career ===
Uspensky's first short stories were published in 1862, in Leo Tolstoy's journal Yasnaya Polyana ("Mikhalych") and in the journal Zritel (Spectator, "The Idyll"). In 1863 Uspensky joined the staff of the Moskovskiye Vedomosti newspaper as a proofreader. In the autumn of that year he moved to Saint Petersburg and published "The Ragman" (Старьевщик) in Biblioteka Dlya Chteniya. In January 1864 he started contributing to Russkoye Slovo ("At Night", "The Nameless One", "In the Country", "Sketches from the Life of an Official"). A year later his stories started to appear in Iskra ("Our Humble Place", "The Stranger") and Sovremennik ("Village Encounters") which awarded him with a 110 ruble yearly grant. In 1866, after the closure of Sovremennik, the first collection of Uspensky's short stories came out in Saint Petersburg.

In 1866 he published a series of sketches about life in the suburbs of his native city of Tula under the title Manners of Rasteryayeva Street, which established his reputation. First chapters of it appeared in February and March issues of Sovremennik, others were published later by Zhensky Vestnik and Luch. That year saw the publication in Saint Petersburg of Gleb Uspensky's first book, Sketches and Stories. In May 1867, having passed the special qualification exams in the Saint Petersburg University, he departed to the town of Epifan in the Tula Governorate and started working there as a teacher. Later that year his second book Holidays and Daily Life in Moscow came out in Saint Petersburg.

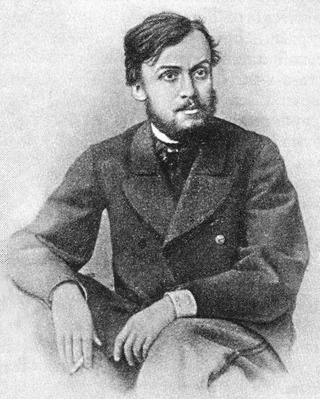
Gleb Uspensky in 1868

In 1868 Uspensky joined Alexander Uvarov's Moscow office as a courier. In April his first story "The Booth" appeared in Otechestvennye Zapiski. He continued to contribute to this magazine up until its closure in 1884, working with Nikolai Nekrasov and Mikhail Saltykov-Shchedrin. In May 1870 he married Alexandra Barayeva, a teacher from Elets. A year before that, Desolation (Razorenje)'s first part ("Mikhail Ivanovich Observations") were published in Otechestvennye Zapiski. In 1871 parts 2 and 3 followed, and the book came out as a separate edition. In May 1871 Uspensky embarked upon a trip along Oka and Volga rivers which resulted in two books of traveller' sketches. In 1872 Gleb Uspensky visited Germany, Belgium and France.

Since October 1873 he remained under the 3rd Department's surveillance which continued for almost thirty years and was lifted in 1901. In 1874 the "Very Small Man" (Очень маленький человек) novella's two parts appeared in Otechestvennye Zapiski, but the publication stopped: the May issue of the magazine was withdrawn by censors. In the 1870s, as his financial position improved, Uspensky traveled widely, becoming acquainted with a number of revolutionary populists, such as Pyotr Lavrov (the Vperyod magazine's editor in London, who several months later published his essay "One Won't Hide a Needle in a Sack") and Sergey Stepnyak. In 1875 Uspensky went to Paris again where he met Ivan Turgenev. The latter recited one of his stories, "Petitioners" (Ходоки), at Pauline Viardot's literary morning, and had great success. That year also saw the release of his book The Backwater. Sketches from the Province and from the Capital, in Saint Peterburg. In April 1876 Uspensky re-joined his family in Paris, then in September went to Serbia, as part of the Russian volunteers' corps, to fight Turkey's occupation. Several political essays entitled Letters from Serbia came out as a result.

Throughout the 1870s and '80s he continued to write about the living and working conditions of the Russian peasants. The Summer of 1877 Uspensky and his family spent in Novgorod gubernia. As a result, series of sketches "From the Country Diary", on local peasants' life there started being published in Otechestvennye Zapiski in October. In 1878 he moved to a village near Samara to go on with his "Country Diary" series. In 1878 two of his collections, "From Memory Book. Sketches and Stories" and "From New and Old (Miscellaneous)", came out in Saint Petersburg. The novella Small Children appeared in Otechestvennye Zapiski in 1880. In March of that year Uspensky organized a literary meeting for Ivan Turgenev to be joined by a group of young authors, including Nikolai Zlatovratsky, Nikolai Naumov, Alexander Ertel and Sergey Krivenko. Soon after that Uspensky moved to Novgorod region to stay at A.V.Kamensky's estate and wrote there "Peasant and Peasant's Labour" (Otechestvennye Zapiski, October–December), an essay which impressed Turgenev a lot. Another book by Uspensky, "The People and the Ways of Contemporary Village" came out in Moscow.

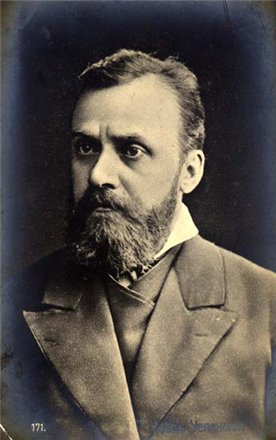
Gleb Uspensky circa 1880

In 1881 Uspensky bought a house in Syabrintsy, Novgorod Governorate, to spend there the rest of his literary life. In November 1881 "The Old Man's Stories" marked his debut in Russkaya Mysl. In 1882 "The Suspicious Beletazh" appeared in OZ (relating a bizarre incident involving a secret police agent's visit to Syabrintsy) as well as two more books, The Village Troubles (Vols.I-III) and The Power of the Land, arguably his best-known work, based on his studies of life in rural Novgorod region.

In the spring of 1883 Gleb Uspensky travelled to the Russian South, visiting Tiflis, Baku and Lenkoran, meeting people from religious groups, fishing cartels and private oil enterprises, resulting with Notes from the Road. Later that year Florenty Pavlenkov released the first three volumes of The Works by Gleb Uspensky.

On April 20, 1884, Otechestvennye Zapiski were closed much to the distress of Uspensky who later gave the journal credit for helping him through hardships. In April 1885 he made a voyage to Kiev, Odessa, Rostov-on-Don, Essentuki and Kislovodsk. This year his "Sketches from Russian Life" appeared in Russkaya Mysl, and "Timelessness" in Russkiye Vedomosti. A series of essays called Of This and That (Кой про что) started his relationship with Severny Vestnik in 1886. After another trip to the South Uspensky signed a lucrative contract with the publisher I.M. Sibiryakov who bought the rights to all of his work for 18.5 thousand rubles. In the late 1886 the final, 8th volume of the Collected Works by Uspensky came out under the old contract.

In December 1886 Russky Vestnik started to publish another set of essays and sketches called "We: In Words, Dreams and Deeds", which impressed Vladimir Korolenko. In early 1887 Uspensky made a trip through Bulgaria; parts of the resulting "Impressions of a Danube Trip". In the autumn of that year the 25th anniversary of his literary career was celebrated in the Russian democratic press and literary circles. On November 16 Uspensky was elected the Honorary Member of the Russian Literary Society. One of his stories of that time, "The Steam Chicken" (Russky Vestnik), was lauded by Lev Tolstoy.

Uspensky's book of essays Living Numbers (on the life of workers in the society of the rising capitalism) remained unfinished due to problems with censorship. In mid-1888 he traveled to Siberia and returned with "Letters from the Road" series. In Tomsk he met some political prisoners, as well as the writer Nikolai Naumov. In October Russkaya Mysl started to publish the "Heavy Sins" (Грехи тяжкие) series. In December Works by Gleb Uspensky in two volumes was published by Pavlenkov, with Nikolai Mikhailovsky's foreword, and enjoyed commercial success.

In June 1889 Uspensky's trip to Orenburg and Ufa regions where he visited the re-settled people, resulted in a collection of sketches From Orenburg to Ufa. Notes from the Road, published by Russky Vestnik. In August this year The Works of Gleb Uspensky in two volumes came out. On October 21, 1889, Nikolai Uspensky, Gleb's cousin, committed suicide. "This awful death darkened my life in the most horrid way," he wrote in one of the letters. In the early 1890 Gleb Uspensky made a trip to Belorussia. In summer he re-visited Volga and travelled down South. In January 1891 his Letters of Resettlers were published by Russkaya Mysl.

=== Later life ===
Uspensky began suffering from mental illness in the mid-1890s, and was unable to continue his literary work. In 1890 he started mentioning feeling very ill in his letters. "Doctor Shereshevsky searched me through and discovered the root of the problem: my brain!" he wrote in a letter to Mikhailovsky on February 18, 1891. In April Nikolai Shelgunov, Uspensky's friend, died. He tried to substitute him as the head of the Internal affairs section in Russkaya Mysl, but the progressing illness made this impossible. The famine in Povolzhje horrified Uspensky and prompted him to start what he called "the story of people's devastation" but his health was deteriorating too fast. The New Year Day of 1892 he spent in doctor Subbotin's clinic. In March he still managed a trip to Povolzhje's worst hit regions and published reports in Russkaya Mysl and Helping the Hungry anthology. In the late June his condition seriously worsened and he entered the Dr. Frei's clinic in Petersburg where he stayed until 20 September. From it he's been transferred to a smaller hospital in Kolmovo, nearby Novgorod.

In September 1893 Uspensky informed V.M.Sobolevsky that he started writing memoirs about Turgenev, Saltykov, Vera Figner "and many other people who cared for the Russian land." In the late September he managed to make a short journey through Novgorod gubernia. In December, now very ill he, supported by son Alexander, visited Korolenko in Nizhny Novgorod. In 1894 Uspensky made another trip out of Kolmovo, now to attend to the student's assembly in the Dvoryanskoe Sobranye hall. The next six years he spent in the Kolmovo hospital. In March 1900 he was transferred to the psychiatric clinic nearby Saint Petersburg. Years 1900-1902 he spent in the Novoznamenskaya hospital. There, on March 24, 1902, he died. On March 27 Gleb Uspensky was buried in the Volkovo Cemetery in Saint Petersburg.

== Legacy ==
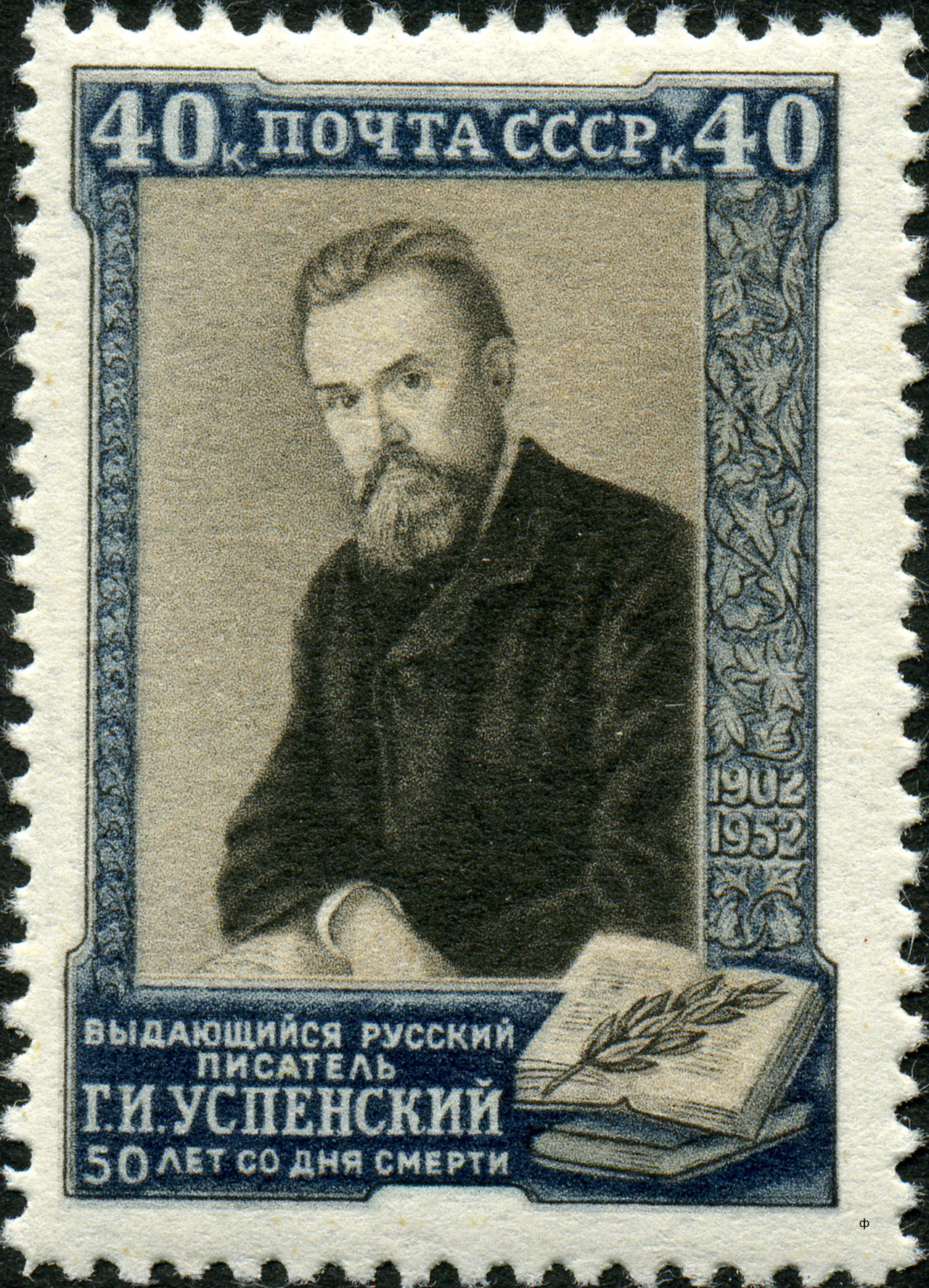
Uspensky on a 1952 stamp

Uspensky's works had a considerable influence on Russian literature and society, and were praised by many of his fellow writers, including Leo Tolstoy, Anton Chekhov, Maxim Gorky and Leon Trotsky. Tolstoy especially liked Uspensky's story "The Incubator Chicken," first published in 1888, and translated into English as "The Steam Chicken" in 1895. The term "chastushki" (ditties) was first used by Gleb Uspensky in his book about Russian folk rhymes published 1889.

== Major works ==
- Manners of Rasteryayeva Street (Нравы Растеряевой улицы, sketches, 1866)
- Desolation (Разоренье, a trilogy of short novels, 1870-1871)
- A Very Small Man (Очень маленький человек, 1874)
- "The Backwater: Sketches from the Province and from the Capital" (Глушь. Провинциальные и столичные очерки, 1875, sketches)
- Small Children (Малые ребята, 1880)
- The Village Troubles (Деревенские неурядицы, 1882)
- The Power of the Land (Власть земли, 1882)
- "Straightened Out" (Выпрямила, 1885, an essay about "art for art's sake")

== English translations ==
- "The Steam Chicken" and "A Trifling Defect in the Mechanism" (stories), from The Humor of Russia, Trans. E.L. Voynich. Introduction by Stepnyak. Illustrations by Paul Frenzeny. London: Walter Scott, Ltd./New York: Charles Scribner's Sons, 1895. from Archive.org
- "Ivan Petrov" (sketch from The Power of the Land), from Anthology of Russian Literature, Leo Wiener, G. P. Putnam's Sons, 1903. from Archive.org
- "Inspecting the Bride" (sketch), from Little Russian Masterpieces, Vol 2, Ragozin, G. P. Putnam's Sons, 1920.
