= Sword and Sorceress series =

Series of fantasy anthologies

The Sword and Sorceress series is a series of fantasy anthologies originally edited by American writer Marion Zimmer Bradley, and originally published by DAW Books. As she explained in the foreword to the first volume, she created the anthology to redress the lack of strong female protagonists in the subgenre of sword and sorcery. At the time, most female characters in sword and sorcery were little more than stock damsels in distress, or pawns who were distributed at the conclusion of the story as "bad-conduct prizes" (Bradley's term) for the male protagonists. Many of the early sword-and-sorcery works featured attitudes toward women that Bradley considered appalling.

As the Sword and Sorceress series grew in popularity with readers, she began to receive increasing numbers of excellent submissions. As a result, she had to become more selective, and to shorten her reading periods accordingly. For the eighteenth volume, which she was editing at the time of her death, she had enough material for three volumes. After her death, it was decided to take as many as possible of the stories she had tentatively chosen and publish them in three annual volumes, thus extending the series. After volume twenty was published, the publisher decided to extend an invitation for an additional volume under Diana L. Paxson, an editor who had worked with Bradley, with the possibility of additional volumes being published if it became a success.

The Sword and Sorceress series is noteworthy not only for its introduction of strong female protagonists into a subgenre previously dominated by male characters, but for its financial success. Unlike most anthologies of original fantasy short fiction, they routinely earned out their advances and continued to pay their authors royalties for years afterward, often on foreign sales. In addition, many authors who made their first professional sales in the Sword and Sorceress anthologies subsequently enjoyed successful careers as novelists.

In February 2007, the Marion Zimmer Bradley Literary Works Trust, which holds her copyrights, negotiated a contract with Norilana Books to publish a new volume and proceed to elicit submissions. The book was published in November, and the editor was Elisabeth Waters. Norilana Books has published four more books of the series, also edited by Elisabeth Waters. From 2012 to 2019 the Marion Zimmer Bradley Literary Works Trust published the Sword and Sorceress anthologies.

== Anthologies ==
=== Sword and Sorceress I ===
1984. ISBN 978-0-88677-359-5 (USA edition)
1986. ISBN 978-0-87997-928-7 (USA edition)
1988. ISBN 978-0-7472-3105-9 (UK edition)

- "The Heroic Image of Women: Woman as Wizard and Warrior" — Marion Zimmer Bradley
- "The Garnet and the Glory" — Phyllis Ann Karr
- "Severed Heads" — Glen Cook
- "Taking Heart" — Stephen L. Burns
- "The Rending Dark" — Emma Bull
- "Gimmile's Songs" — Charles R. Saunders
- "The Valley of the Troll" — Charles de Lint
- "Imperatrix" — Deborah Wheeler
- "Blood of Sorcery" — Jennifer Roberson
- "With Four Lean Hounds" — Pat Murphy
- "House in the Forest" — Anodea Judith
- "Sword of Yraine" — Diana L. Paxson
- "Daton and the Dead Things" — Michael Ward
- "Gate of the Damned" — Janet Fox
- "Child of Orcus" — Robin Wayne Bailey
- "Things Come in Threes" — Dorothy J. Heydt

=== Sword and Sorceress II ===
1985. ISBN 978-0-88677-041-9 (USA Edition)
1986. ISBN 978-0-88677-360-1 (USA Edition)
1988. ISBN 978-0-7472-3106-6 (UK Edition)

- "Introduction" — Marion Zimmer Bradley
- "A Night at Two Inns" — Phyllis Ann Karr
- "The Red Guild" — Rachel Pollack
- "Shadow Wood" — Diana L. Paxson
- "Unicorn's Blood" — Bruce D. Arthurs
- "The Unshadowed Land" — C. J. Cherryh
- "Shimenege's Mask" — Charles R. Saunders
- "The Black Tower" — Stephen L. Burns
- "The Lady and the Tiger" — Jennifer Roberson
- "Fireweb" — Deborah Wheeler
- "Cold Blows the Wind" — Charles de Lint
- "Sword of the Mother" — Dana Kramer-Rolls
- "Hunger" — Russ Garrison
- "On First Looking into Bradley's Guidelines" — Elizabeth Thompson
- "The Chosen Maiden" — Raul Reyes
- "Red Pearls" — Richard Corwin
- "Wound on the Moon" — Vera Nazarian (within the anthology it is titled The Wound in the Moon)

=== Sword and Sorceress III ===
1986. ISBN 978-0-88677-141-6 (USA edition)
1986. ISBN 978-0-88677-302-1 (USA edition)
1988. ISBN 978-0-7472-3107-3 (UK edition)

- "The Evolution of Women's Fantasy" — Marion Zimmer Bradley
- "Dragon-Amber" — Deborah Wheeler
- "Enter the Wolf" — A. D. Overstreet
- "Valley of the Shadow" — Jennifer Roberson
- "The Song and the Flute" — Dorothy J. Heydt
- "Journeytime" — Dana Kramer-Rolls
- "Orpheus" — Mary Frances Zambreno
- "Scarlet Eyes" — Millea Kenin
- "The River of Tears" — Anodea Judith
- "Fresh Blood" — Polly B. Johnson
- "The Mist on the Moor" — Diana L. Paxson
- "Bargains" — Elizabeth Moon
- "A Woman's Privilege" — Elisabeth Waters
- "Talla" — J. Edwin Andrews
- "Tupilak" — Terry Tafoya
- "Sword-Sworn" — Mercedes Lackey
- "A Tale from Hendry's Mill" — Melissa Carpenter
- "S.A.R." — Patricia B. Cirone
- "More's the Pity" — L. D. Woeltjen
- "Marwe's Forest" — Charles R. Saunders
- "The Hunters" — Mavis J. Andrews

=== Sword and Sorceress IV ===
1987. ISBN 978-0-88677-210-9 (USA edition)
1989. ISBN 978-0-88677-412-7 (USA edition)
1989. ISBN 978-0-7472-3364-0 (UK edition)

- "Introduction" — Marion Zimmer Bradley
- "A Tale of Heroes" — Mercedes Lackey
- "The Woodland of Zarad-Thra" — Robin Wayne Bailey
- "The Weeping Oak" — Charles de Lint
- "Gullrider" — Dave Smeds
- "Blood Dancer" — Diana L. Paxson
- "Kayli's Fire" — Paula Helm Murray
- "The Ring of Lifari" — Josepha Sherman
- "Rite of Passage" — Jennifer Roberson
- "The Eyes of the Gods" — Richard Corwin
- "Fate and the Dreamer" — Millea Kenin
- "The Noonday Witch" — Dorothy J. Heydt
- "Redeemer's Riddle" — Stephen L. Burns
- "The Tree-Wife of Arketh" — Syn Ferguson
- "Spell of Binding" — Richard Cornell
- "Storm God" — Deborah Wheeler
- "Die Like a Man" — L. D. Woeltjen
- "Death and the Ugly Woman" — Bruce D. Arthurs
- "Bloodstones" — Deborah M. Vogel

=== Sword and Sorceress V ===
1988. ISBN 978-0-88677-288-8 (USA edition)
1989. ISBN 978-0-7472-3389-3 (UK edition)

- "Introduction or Something" – Marion Zimmer Bradley
- "Sorcerer's Pet" — Margaret L. Carter
- "Into the Green" — Charles de Lint
- "Eyes of the Laemi" — Janet Fox
- "Jewels" — Linda Gordon
- "Dance of the Healer" — M. R. Hildebrand
- "One Night at the Inn" — Millea Kenin
- "Keys" — Mercedes Lackey
- "Drum Duel" — Gerald Perkins
- "The Eye of Toyur" — Diana L. Paxson
- "Peet's Bride" — Dana Kramer-Rolls
- "Warrior's Way" — A. D. Overstreet
- "Spoils of War" — Jennifer Roberson
- "Cholin of Carnel" — B. A. Rolls
- "Rite of Vengeance" — Deborah Wheeler
- "Bloodstone" — Mary Frances Zambreno
- "Sword Singer" — Laura J. Underwood
- "Stormbringer" — Steve Tymon
- "Sorceress of the Gulls" — Dave Smeds
- "Runaways" — Josepha Sherman
- "The Golden Egg" — Morning Glory Zell
- "Revised Standard Virgin" — Rick Cook
- "Dragon Lovers" — Cynthia Drolet

=== Sword and Sorceress VI ===
1990. ISBN 978-0-88677-423-3

- "Introduction" — Marion Zimmer Bradley
- "Equona's Mare" — Diana L. Paxson
- "The Hand of Fatima" — Shariann Lewitt
- "Commencement" — Lynne Armstrong-Jones
- "A Lesser of Evils" — Morning Glory Zell
- "And Sáavüld Danced..." — Kier Neustaedter
- "Stone of Light" — Linda Gordon
- "Change of Command" — Nancy Jane Moore
- "The Starry King" — Vera Nazarian
- "Mirror Image" — Nina Boal
- "Sleeping Dogs" — Jennifer Roberson
- "Shadowlands" — Elisabeth Waters
- "The Making of a Legend" — Mercedes Lackey
- "Burnt Offerings" — Mary Fenoglio
- "Ratsbane" — Dorothy J. Heydt
- "Wolf Hunt" — Bobbi Miller
- "Pearl" — Carl Thelen
- "Name of the Demoness" — Jessie D. Eaker
- "Hands" — Lois Tilton
- "Wolfrunner" — Mary E. Choo
- "Until We Meet Again" — J. A. Brebner
- "Black Wolf" — Gemma Tarlach

=== Sword and Sorceress VII ===
1990. ISBN 978-0-88677-457-8

- "Introduction" — Marion Zimmer Bradley
- "At the Tolling of Midnight" — Stephanie Shaver
- "The Buddy System" — Laura Thurston
- "The Cloud of Evil" — Mark Tompkins
- "Heart of the Matter" — Rowena A. Bathgate
- "A Wolf in the Fold" — Deborah Wheeler
- "A Thing of Love" — Vera Nazarian
- "The Sword Slave" — Diana L. Paxson
- "Festival Gatherers" — Diann Partridge
- "The Talisman" — Mercedes Lackey
- "Widow" — Kathleen A. Varnado
- "Just Desserts" — Elizabeth McCoy
- "Mending Wounds" — Gary Jonas
- "St. George and the Dragon" — Nancy Jane Moore
- "Her Father's Daughter" — Sue Isle
- "Winterkill" — Laurell K. Hamilton
- "Staying Behind" — Jessie D. Eaker
- "Hawk's Hill" — Gary Herring
- "Waterwise" — Mary Frey
- "The Second Song" — I. F. Cole
- "The Thorny Path to Wizardry" — Lawrence Schimel
- "Grim Calling" — Patricia B. Cirone
- "Winter's Daughter" — Diane Burrell
- "The Bridge Over Darikill Fel" — Stephen L. Burns
- "Warrior's Oath" — Lynne Armstrong-Jones
- "Lost Souls" — Alison Brooks

=== Sword and Sorceress VIII ===
1991. ISBN 978-0-88677-486-8

- "Introduction" — Marion Zimmer Bradley
- "Beauty and His Beast" — Vera Nazarian
- "Retirement Plan" — Margaret Howes
- "The Opal Skull" — Cynthia Ward
- "Edyth Among the Trolls" — Lois Tilton
- "Out of the Frying Pan" — Elisabeth Waters
- "Trading Swords" — Dave Smeds
- "East of the Dawn" — Jere Dunham
- "Stained Glass" — Linda Gordon
- "The Price of the Wind" — Josepha Sherman
- "Spellbinder" — Rosemary Edghill
- "Shards of Crystal" — Stephanie Shaver
- "Song of the Dragon" — Andrea Pelleschi
- "A Throw of the Dice" — Nancy L. Pine
- "Heart's Desires" — Walter L. Kleine
- "Ytarra's Mirror" — Diana L. Paxson
- "Kayli Kidnapped" — Paula Helm Murray
- "Fair Play" — Jennifer Roberson
- "She Who Shields" — Gary W. Herring
- "Marayd's Escape" — Rima Saret
- "Geese" — Laurell K. Hamilton
- "Wings of Fire" — Mercedes Lackey
- "Masks" — Deborah Burros

=== Sword and Sorceress IX ===
1992. ISBN 978-0-88677-509-4

- "Introduction" — Marion Zimmer Bradley
- "Slave to the Sword" — Tanya Beaty
- "Shadows Do Not Bleed" — Bruce D. Arthurs
- "Beastly!" — Lynne Armstrong-Jones
- "Piper" — Susan Hanniford Crowley
- "Stopthrust" — Diana L. Paxson
- "Elynne Dragonchild" — Phil Brucato
- "Freeing Souls" — Lisa Deason
- "Blademistress" — Jessie D. Eaker
- "Sorcerers' Gate" — Patricia Duffy Novak
- "The Birthday Gift" — Elisabeth Waters
- "Tangled Webs" — Laura J. Underwood
- "Winterwood" — Stephanie Shaver
- "Red Wings" — Josepha Sherman
- "Above the Ground" — Eric Haines
- "On a Night Like Any Other" — Mark Tompkins
- "A Woman's Weapon" — Mercedes Lackey
- "Behind the Waterfall" — Mary Frey
- "Hoard" — Steven Piziks
- "Queen of the Dead" — Dorothy J. Heydt
- "The Flower that Does Not Wither" — Dave Smeds
- "To Have and to Hold" — Linda Gordon
- "The Catalyst" — Lee Ann Martins
- "Breaking Walls" — Leslie Ann Miller
- "The Enchanted Frog" — Cynthia L. Ward
- "The Price of the Gods" — Roxana Pierson
- "Tiger's Eye" — Syne Mitchell

=== Sword and Sorceress X ===
1993. ISBN 978-0-88677-552-0

- "Introduction" — Marion Zimmer Bradley
- "Lorelei" — Tina Good
- "Falcon's Shadow" — Diana L. Paxson
- "The Proper Balance" — Robyn McGrew
- "The Gift of Minerva" — Dorothy J. Heydt
- "Friendly Fire" — Mercedes Lackey
- "Heart in a Box" — Lynne Armstrong-Jones
- "Dance of Death" — Donna Bocian Currie
- "Earth, Air, Fire, and Water" — Kirsten M. Corby
- "Fealty" — Kati Dougherty
- "Hunt for the Queen's Beast" — J. M. Cressy
- "Robes" — Patricia Duffy Novak
- "Bonds of Light" — Vera Nazarian
- "Night, Who Creeps Through Keyholes" — Francesca Myman
- "Oaths" — Leslie Ann Miller
- "Double Vision" — Lucas K. Law
- "The Phoenix Medallion" — Diann Partridge
- "A Run in the Forest" — David A. Pillard
- "Old Age and Treachery ..." — Nancy L. Pine
- "In Sheep's Clothing" — Lawrence Schimel
- "Her Mother's Sword" — Stephanie Shaver
- "The Sorceress' Apprentice" — Deborah Wheeler
- "Mage-Sight" — Lynne Alisse Witten
- "Ether and the Skeptic" — Katy Huth Jones
- "The Limwitch" — Rebekah Jensen
- "Smile of the Goddess" — Lorina J. Stephens
- "Just Reward" — Karen Luk
- "Boys Will Be Girls" — Vicki Kirchhoff
- "Taking Shape" — Lisa Deason
- "Justice Is Mine" — Carolee J. Edwards

=== Sword and Sorceress XI ===
1994. ISBN 978-0-88677-614-5

- "Introduction" — Marion Zimmer Bradley
- "Call the Wild Horses" — Bunnie Bessell
- "Keepsake" — Lynn Michals
- "Spirit Singer" — Diana L. Paxson
- "Final Exam" — Jessica R. Lerbs
- "The Stratmoor Bear" — Charley Pearson
- "Grumble Snoot" — Vaughn Heppner
- "Tales" — Javonna L. Anderson
- "Maggot's Feast" — Jo Clayton
- "Moonriders" — Lynne Armstrong-Jones
- "Thief, Thief!" — Mary Catelli
- "Healing" — Hannah Blair
- "Virgin Spring" — Cynthia McQuillin
- "The Haven" — Judith Kobylecky
- "Savior" — Tom Gallier
- "Bad Luck and Curses" — Jessie Eaker
- "The Mistress' Riddle" — Karen Luk
- "Rusted Blade" — Dave Smeds
- "Images of Love" — Larry Tritten
- "A Fate Worse Than Death" — Diann Partridge
- "Power Play" — Sandra Morrese
- "Fenwitch" — Sarah Evans
- "Green-Eyed Monster" — Vicki Kirchhoff
- "Snowfire" — D. Lopes Heald
- "Ancient Warrior" — Stephanie Shaver
- "Barbarian Legacy" — Lawrence Schimel
- "Mist" — Laura J. Underwood
- "Songhealer" — Tammi Labrecque
- "The Sow's Ear" — Kathy Ann Trueman
- "Poisoned Dreams" — Deborah Wheeler
- "Night-Beast" — Cynthia Ward
- "The Gift" — Rochelle Marie
- "The Crystal Casket" — Kristine Sprunger
- "Ringed In" — Mildred Perkins

=== Sword and Sorceress XII ===
1995. ISBN 978-0-88677-657-2

- "Introduction" — Marion Zimmer Bradley
- "Demon in Glass" — John P. Buentello
- "Does the Shoe Fit You Now?" — Carolyn J. Bahr
- "A Lynx and a Bastard" — Karen Luk
- "Dragonskin Boots" — Lisa S. Silverthorne
- "Truth" — Lynne Armstrong-Jones
- "Skins" — Heather Rose Jones
- "Though the World Is Darkness" — Lisa Deason
- "Hemparius the Trader" — Valerie Atkinson Gawthrop
- "Chance" — Tom Gallier
- "Touched by the Gods" — Deborah Millitello
- "Promise to Angel" — Stephanie Shaver
- "Shadow Harper" — Cynthia McQuillin
- "The Stone Face, the Giant, and the Paradox" — Vera Nazarian
- "Wormwood" — Laura J. Underwood
- "Silverblade" — Deborah Wheeler
- "A Dragon in Distress" — Mercedes Lackey and Elisabeth Waters
- "Stone Spirit" — Diana L. Paxson
- "Garden of Glories" — Jennifer Roberson
- "Stealing the Power" — Linda J. Dunn
- "The Lost Path" — Patricia Duffy Novak
- "Winter Roses" — Patricia Sayre McCoy
- "Amber" — Syne Mitchell

=== Sword and Sorceress XIII ===
1996. ISBN 978-0-88677-703-6

- "Introduction" — Marion Zimmer Bradley
- "Patience" — Jo Clayton
- "Sun Dancer" — Leslie Ann Miller
- "Spider's Offer" — Charles M. Saplak
- "More Than One Way" — Heather Rose Jones
- "Daelith's Bargain" — Cynthia McQuillin
- "The Spirit Arrow" — Deborah Wheeler
- "The Choosing" — John P. Buentello
- "Tortoise Weeps" — Marella Sands
- "What the Gods Will" — Kathleen Dalton-Woodbury
- "Double Blind" — Syne Mitchell
- "Patchwork Magic" — P. Andrew Miller
- "Twilight" — Diana L. Paxson
- "Personal Need" — Lynn Michals
- "Catriona's Daughters" — Andrea J. Horlick
- "The Whisht Hound's Bone" — Laura J. Underwood
- "The Werewolf's Final Lesson" — Joette M. Rozanski
- "The Curse of Tanit" — Dorothy J. Heydt
- "Dual" — Quinn Weller
- "Spirit Quest" — Kathryne Kennedy
- "Crow Feathers" — Lawrence Schimel
- "Jewel-Bright" — Stephanie Shaver
- "The Comforter" — Jean Marie Egger

=== Sword and Sorceress XIV ===
1997. ISBN 978-0-88677-741-8

- "The Bargain" — Laura J. Underwood
- "The Impression of Power" — Lee Martindale
- "The Naming of Names" — Adrienne Martine-Barnes
- "Changelings" — Diana L. Paxson
- "Death Hunt" — Raul S. Reyes
- "A Single Soul" — Deborah Wheeler
- "The Needle and the Sword" — Jessie D. Eaker
- "Small Considerations" — Judith Fielder Leggett
- "If You Can't Stand the Heat..." — P.E. Cunningham
- "Silver Bands" — Syne Mitchell
- "The Hand of a Lady" — Anne Cutrell
- "To Have and to Hold" — Karen Barnes
- "A Knight On Tower Hill" — Kathrina Bood
- "The Longest Night" — Lisa S. Silverthorne
- "Blood Moon" — Cynthia Ward
- "By the Skin of Her Teeth" — Heather Rose Jones
- "Friends in High Places" — Christina Krueger
- "The Blade of Unmaking" — Elisabeth Waters
- "The Stone-Weaver's Tale" — Cynthia McQuillin
- "The Hollow Dancer" — Mary Soon Lee
- "La Faie Suiateih" — Lisa Deason
- "Vengeance" — Dorothy J. Heydt
- "The Moongate Troll" — Patricia Duffy Novak
- "Lifestone" — Mary Catelli
- "White Elephants" — Christopher Kempke
- "Traveler's Aide" — Kathleen Thompson
- "Afterword: The Last Word" — Rachel E. Holmen

=== Sword and Sorceress XV ===
1998. ISBN 978-0-88677-768-5

- "Introduction" — Marion Zimmer Bradley
- "With a Warrior's Soul" — John P. Buentello
- "Perseverance" — Deborah Burros
- "Where there is Smoke" — Mary Catelli
- "Unbinding Spell" — Andrea Chodan
- "Cecropia" — Susan Hanniford Crowley
- "To Live Forever" — Jessie D. Eaker
- "Queen's Anvil" — Sarah Lyons
- "The Sick Rose" — Dorothy J. Heydt
- "Skin-Deep" — Heather Rose Jones
- "One Last Dragon, One Last Time" — Cath McBride
- "Under Her Wing" — Devon Monk
- "Shimmering Scythe" — Vera Nazarian
- "Spring Snow" — Diana L. Paxson
- "Oaths" — Lynn Morgan Rosser
- "Something Precious" — Carol Tompkins
- "All These Days" — Peter Trachtenberg
- "His Heart of Stone" — Laura J. Underwood
- "A Matter of Names" — Cynthia Ward
- "The Dragon's Horde" — Elisabeth Waters and Raul S. Reyes
- "The Phoenix Blade" — Deborah Wheeler
- "The Smell of Magic" — Kathleen Dalton-Woodbury
- "Seal-Woman's Power" — Paul Edwin Zimmer

=== Sword and Sorceress XVI ===
1999. ISBN 978-0-88677-843-9

- "Introduction" — Marion Zimmer Bradley
- "The Kappa's Gift" — Fujiko
- "The Changeless Room" — Charlotte Carlson
- "Isabelle and the Siren" — Mary Catelli
- "Dragon's Tear" — Sonya Fedotowsky
- "A Sister's Blood" — Patricia B. Cirone
- "Changed" – Lisa Deason
- "The Power to Change the Shape of the Land" — Dayle A. Dermatis
- "The Frog Prince" — Linda J. Dunn
- "Honey from the Rock" — Dorothy J. Heydt
- "The Will of the Wind" — Christina Krueger
- "Moonlight on Water" — Carol E. Leever
- "Nine Springs" — Kathleen M. Massie-Ferch
- "Mistweaver" — Terry McGarry
- "Waking the Stone Maiden" — Cynthia McQuillin
- "City of No-Sleep" — Vera Nazarian
- "Daughter of the Bear" — Diana L. Paxson
- "The Wishing Stones" — Lisa S. Silverthorne
- "A Fool's Game" — Selina Rosen
- "The Anvil of Her Pride" — Lawrence Schimel
- "The Dancing Men of Ballyben" — Laura J. Underwood
- "Salt & Sorcery" — Michael Spence and Elisabeth Waters
- "Weaving Spells" — Lawrence Watt-Evans
- "Enaree, An Azkhantian Tale" — Deborah Wheeler
- "The Day They Ran Out of Princesses" — Gail Sosinsky Wickman
- "Taking Flight" — Susan Wolven
- "The Vision that Appeared" — Katherine L. Rogers

=== Sword and Sorceress XVII ===
2000. ISBN 978-0-88677-891-0

- "Introduction" — Marion Zimmer Bradley
- "Memories of the Sea" — Dave Coleman-Reese
- "Free Passage" — Mary Catelli
- "The Conjuror's Light" — Lisa Campos
- "My Sister's Song" — Gail Carriger (writing as T. Borregaard)
- "The Summons" — Bunnie Bessell
- "Luz" — Patricia Duffy Novak
- "Caelqua's Spring" — Vera Nazarian
- "Deep as Rivers" — Cynthia McQuillin
- "Weapons at War" — Charles Richard Laing
- "Hell Hath No Fury ..." — Lee Martindale
- "An Exchange of Favors" — Dorothy J. Heydt
- "Price of the Sword" — Kim Fryer
- "Demon Calling" — ElizaBeth Gilligan
- "Nor Iron Bars a Cage" — Deborah Wheeler
- "The Haunting of Princess Elizabeth" — Carrie Vaughn
- "Shadow Soul" — Laura J. Underwood
- "Memories Traced in Snow" — Dave Smeds
- "Valkyrie" — Jenn Reese
- "Soul Dance" — Lisa S. Silverthorne
- "Lady of Flame" — Diana L. Paxson
- "The Tears of the Moon" — Cynthia Ward

=== Sword and Sorceress XVIII ===
2001. ISBN 978-0-88677-996-2

- "Introduction" — Elisabeth Waters
- "A Passage of Power" — Diana L. Paxson
- "Lessons Learned" — Kati Dougherty-Carthum
- "Kendat's Ax" — Jan Combs
- "The Tower of Song" — Howard Holman
- "The Needed Stone" — Denise Lopes Heald
- "Armageddon" — Lisa S. Silverthorne
- "The Land of Graves" — Dave Smeds
- "Light" — Susan Urbanek Linville
- "In the Sacred Places of the Earth" — Dorothy J. Heydt
- "The Glass Sword" — Richard Corwin
- "Bed of Roses" — Elisabeth Waters
- "Sword of Peace" — Lucy Cohen Schmeidler
- "The Fall of the Kingdom" — Mary Soon Lee
- "Arms and the Woman" — Lawrence Watt-Evans
- "The Stone Wives" — Michael Chesley Johnson
- "Tiger's Eye" — India Edghill
- "Raven-wings on the Snow" — Pauline J. Alama
- "Little Rogue Riding Hood" — Rosemary Edghill
- "The Queen in Yellow" — Gerald Perkins
- "Magic Threads" — Pete D. Manison

=== Sword and Sorceress XIX ===
2002. ISBN 978-0-7564-0049-1

- "Introduction" — Elisabeth Waters
- "The Curse of Ardal Glen" — Laura J. Underwood
- "When the King is Weak" — Barbara E. Tarbox
- "The Sign of the Boar" — Diana L. Paxson
- "A Matter of Focus" — Penny Buchanan
- "Inner Sight" — Susan Wolven
- "Familiars" — Michael H. Payne
- "Ordeal" — Robyn McGrew
- "Grain" — Esther M. Friesner
- "Gifts of the Kami" — Carol E. Leever
- "One in Ten Thousand" — Aimee Kratts
- "Lord of the Earth" — Dorothy J. Heydt
- "Lady of Light" — Jennifer Ashley
- "All Too Familiar" — P. Andrew Miller
- "Artistic License" — Deborah Burros
- "Earth, Wind and Water" — Bob Dennis
- "Fire for the Senjen Tiger" — Stephen Crane Davidson
- "Fighting Spirit" — Karen Magon
- "Pride, Prejudice and Paranoia" — Michael Spence
- "A Simple Spell" — Marilyn A. Racette
- "Sword of Queens" — Bunnie Bessel (sic—all three occurrences in this book spell it "Bessel")
- "Better Seen than Heard" — Emily C. A. Snyder
- "Openings" — Meg Heydt
- "A Little Magic" — P. E. Cunningham
- "Eloma's Second Career" — Lorie Calkins
- "Sylvia" — A. Hall

=== Sword and Sorceress XX ===
2003. ISBN 978-0-7564-0142-9

- "Introduction" — Elisabeth Waters and Ann Sharp
- "Bread and Arrows" — Deborah Wheeler
- "Mermaid Offerings" — Linda J. Dunn
- "Blood Will Tell" — Dorothy J. Heydt
- "Mairi's Wine" — Mara Grey
- "The Mask of Medusa's Daughter" — Kathryn J. Brown
- "The Sorcerer of Rasston" — Patricia Duffy Novak
- "Legacy" — Lisa Deason
- "The Last Swan Princess" — Patricia Sayre McCoy
- "Swordtongue" — Anne Cutrell
- "Leaves of Iron" — Cynthia McQuillin
- "The Challenge" — Richard Calantropio
- "Celtic Beauty" — Winifred Phillips
- "Late Blooming" — Margaret L. Carter
- "Swords for Teeth, Mirrors for Eyes" — Charles M. Saplak
- "Shen's Daughter" — Mary Soon Lee
- "The Robber Girl, the Strangers, and Ole Lukoie" — Phyllis Ann Karr
- "Too in the Morning" — George Barr
- "The Song of the Stones" — Diana L. Paxson
- "Homily" — The Rev. C. Robbins Clark

=== Sword and Sorceress XXI ===
2004. ISBN 978-0-7564-0195-5. Edited by Diana L. Paxson.

- "Introduction" — Diana L. Paxson
- "Sword and Sorceress" — Jennifer G. Tifft
- "A Kind of Redemption" — John P. Buentello
- "Lostland" — Rosemary Edghill
- "Multiple Choice" — Leslie Fish
- "Child's Play" — Esther M. Friesner
- "Journey's End" — Dorothy J. Heydt
- "Spell of the Sparrow" — Jim C. Hines
- "The Skin Trade" — Heather Rose Jones
- "Dawn and Dusk" — Dana Kramer-Rolls
- "Oulu" — Aimee Kratts
- "Kin" — Naomi Kritzer
- "Sun Thief" — K. A. Laity
- "The Woman's Place" — Susan Urbanek Linville
- "Rose in Winter" — Marie M. Loughin
- "Plowshares" — Rebecca Maines
- "Necessity and the Mother" — Lee Martindale
- "Kazhe's Blade" — Terry McGarry
- "Parri's Blade" — Cynthia McQuillin
- "Ursa" — Jenn Reese
- "Love Potion #8½" — Marilyn A. Racette
- "Favor of the Goddess" — Lynn Morgan Rosser
- "Step By Step" — Catherine Soto
- "Red Caramae" — Kit Wesler

=== Sword and Sorceress XXII ===
2007. ISBN 978-1-934648-15-5. Edited by Elisabeth Waters.
2007. ISBN 978-1-934169-90-2. Edited by Elisabeth Waters.

- "Edra's Arrow" — Esther M. Friesner
- "A Nose for Trouble" — Patricia B. Cirone
- "Night Watches" — Catherine Soto
- "Vanishing Village" — Margaret L. Carter
- "Pearl of Fire" — Deborah J. Ross
- "The Ironwood Box" — Kimberly L. Maughan
- "Bearing Shadows" — Dave Smeds
- "Black Ghost, Red Ghost" — Jonathan Moeller
- "The Decisive Princess" — Catherine Mintz
- "Child of the Father" — Alanna Morland
- "Child of Ice, Child of Flame" — Marian Allen
- "Skin and Bones" — Heather Rose Jones
- "Crosswort Puzzle" — Michael Spence and Elisabeth Waters
- "Fairy Debt" — T. Borregaard
- "Tontine" — Robert E. Vardeman
- "The Menagerie" — Sarah Dozier

=== Sword and Sorceress XXIII ===
2008. ISBN 978-1-934648-78-0. Edited by Elisabeth Waters.

- "Daughters of Brightshield" — Pauline J. Alama
- "Undivided" — Marian Allen
- "It's All in the Making" — Patricia B. Cirone
- "Shalott's Inn" — Leah Cypess
- "Wolf Maiden" — Linda L. Donahue
- "Polish on, Polish off: A Dragon Tale" — Tom Inister
- "Scam Artistry" — Mercedes Lackey and Elisabeth Waters
- "The Vessel" — Gerri Leen
- "Fairest Of Them All" — Melissa Mead
- "Blood Moon" — Catherine Mintz
- "Stolen Ghosts" — Jonathan Moeller
- "Black Magic" — Resa Nelson
- "The Frog's Princess" — Kristin Noone
- "Squirrel Errant" — Michael H. Payne
- "Remembering" — Deborah Wheeler
- "A Morsel for the Plague Queen" — Dave Smeds
- "Hope for the Dawn" — Catherine Soto
- "Daughter of Heaven" — Michael Spence and Elisabeth Waters
- "Deermouse" — K. D. Wentworth

=== Sword and Sorceress XXIV ===
2009. ISBN 978-1-60762-048-8. Edited by Elisabeth Waters.

- "Introduction" — Elisabeth Waters
- "The Casket of Brass" — Deborah Wheeler
- "Merlin's Clutter" — Helen E. Davis
- "Sceptre of the Ungodly" — Elisabeth Waters and Michael Spence
- "Material Witness" — Brenta Blevins
- "Owl Court" — K. D. Wentworth
- "Nellandra's Keeper" — Teresa Howard
- "Sages and Demons" — Catherine Soto
- "The Case of the Haunted City" — Josepha Sherman
- "Pax Draconica" — Cate McBride
- "Sea-Child" — Cynthia Ward
- "Ghost Masks" — Jonathan Moeller
- "The Vapors of Crocodile Fen" — Dave Smeds
- "Lord Shashensa" — Therese Arkenberg
- "Three on a Match" — Michael H. Payne
- "A Curious Case" — Annclaire Livoti
- "Soul Walls" — Julia H. West
- "Little Red" — Melissa Mead

=== Sword and Sorceress XXV ===
2010. ISBN 978-1-60762-081-5. Edited by Elisabeth Waters.

- "Introduction" — Elisabeth Waters
- "The Sorceress's Apprentice" — Pauline J. Alama
- "Killing Stars" — Robin Wayne Bailey
- "Mira" — Steven Brust
- "Proving Grounds" — Stepan Chapman
- "Impossible Quests" — Kate Coombs
- "A Wall To Keep The World Out" — Helen E. Davis
- "Caden's Death" — Amy Griswold
- "Ghost Puppet" — Jonathan Moeller
- "Well Enough" — Lauren K. Moody
- "Matriculation" — Michael H. Payne
- "Fire and Fate" — Deborah Wheeler
- "The Lost and Found Talisman" — Josepha Sherman
- "Homecoming" — Jonathan Shipley
- "The Etherine Road" — Dave Smeds
- "Winter in Khotan" — Catherine Soto
- "Inquisition for Blood" — Michael Spence and Elisabeth Waters
- "Simon's Fish" — Barbara Tarbox
- "Pantheon Shift Change" — L. M. Townsend-Crow
- "The Sundered Star" — K. D. Wentworth
- "Saved by the Soap" — Susan Wolven

=== Sword and Sorceress XXVI ===
2011. ISBN 978-1-60762-096-9. Edited by Elisabeth Waters.

- "Introduction" — Elisabeth Waters
- "A Legal Affair" — Kat Otis
- "The Seal Hunt" — Deborah Wheeler
- "The Girl Who Folded Dragons" — Jean Tatro
- "Hedgewitch" — Jonathan Shipley
- "Banjooli" — Melissa Mead
- "Truth in the Inward Parts" — Michael Spence and Elisabeth Waters
- "Mad Magic" — Margaret L. Carter
- "The Page Turner" — Dave Smeds
- "The Cave of Almerzan" — Patricia Duffy Novak
- "The Raw and the Cooked" — Michael H. Payne
- "Wisdom of Winds" — Pauline J. Alama
- "Nemesis" — Stepan Chapman
- "The Hungry Ghost" — J. C. Hsyu
- "Ghost Dance" — Jonathan Moeller
- "Hallah Iron-Thighs and the Dancing Djinn" — K. D. Wentworth
- "Time for Tears" — David L. Burkhead
- "Not the Best Neighbors" — Julia H. West
- "The Hate-Filled Gnome" — Joette M. Rozanski
- "Summer Flu" — Katharina Schuschke

=== Sword and Sorceress XXVII ===
2012. ISBN 978-1-938185-08-3. Edited by Elisabeth Waters.

- "Introduction" — Elisabeth Waters
- "A Hunter of the Celadon Plains" — Deborah Wheeler
- "The Memory Box" — Patricia B. Cirone
- "Grave Gold" — Jonathan Shipley
- "Forever Is a Long Time" — Melissa Mead
- "They That Watch" — Michael Spence and Elisabeth Waters
- "Straw-Spun" — Leah Cypess
- "Mahrut's Road" — Nathan Crowder
- "Storm Over Taktsang" — Catherine Soto
- "Airs Above the Ground" — Michael H. Payne
- "Netcasters" — Layla Lawlor
- "The Salt Mines" – Dave Smeds
- "Strength, Wisdom, and Compassion" — Julia H. West
- "Dead Princesses" — Stepan Chapman
- "The Rising" — Pauline J. Alama
- "Ghost Pyres" — Jonathan Moeller
- "Jack in Black" — Linda A. B. Davis

=== Sword and Sorceress XXVIII ===
2013. ISBN 978-1-938185-31-1. Edited by Elisabeth Waters.

- "Introduction" — Elisabeth Waters
- "Dead Salt" — Jonathan Shipley
- "The Rolang of Taiyung" — Catherine Soto
- "Tear-Stained Sword" — Jessie D. Eaker
- "A Variation in Silence" — Rebecca G. Eaker
- "The Tavern at the Ford" — Dave Smeds
- "The Damsel in the Garden" — Pauline J. Alama
- "Ghost Spike" — Jonathan Moeller
- "Ru's bad Day" — Lorie Calkins
- "The Vine Princess" — Stepan Chapman
- "Trading Gifts" — Rabia Gale
- "A Drink of Deadly Wine" — Michael Spence and Elisabeth Waters
- "Promises and Pastry" — Melissa Mead
- "Where There's Smoke" — Michael H. Payne
- "Justice" — Suzan Harden
- "Pearl of Tears" — Deborah Wheeler
- "What's in a Name?" — Katharina Schuschke

=== Sword and Sorceress XXIX ===
2014. ISBN 978-1-938185-39-7. Edited by Elisabeth Waters.

- "Introduction" — Elisabeth Waters
- "The Poisoned Crown" — Deborah Wheeler
- "Heartless" — Stepan Chapman
- "Witch of Stones" — Rebecca G. Eaker
- "Chosen Ones" — Amy Griswold
- "Warmonger" — Robin Wayne Bailey
- "Gift Horses" — Samantha Rich
- "Plausible Deniability" — Cat Greenberg and Bari Greenberg
- "The Stormwitch's Daughter" — Dave Smeds
- "Shining Silver, Hidden Gold" — Catherine Soto
- "Mendacity" — Michael H. Payne
- "Amma's Wishes" — M. E. Garber
- "Dead Hand of the Past" — Jonathan Shipley
- "Nut Rolls" — Patricia B. Cirone
- "With Thy Six Keys Enter" — Julia H. West
- "All Else" — Pauline J. Alama
- "Gods of the Elders" — Jonathan Moeller
- "Bronze Bras and More!" — Melissa Mead
- "About Sword and Sorceress" — Elisabeth Waters

=== Sword and Sorceress 30 ===
2015. ISBN 978-1-938185-40-3. Edited by Elisabeth Waters.

- "Introduction" — Elisabeth Waters
- "The Sea Witches" — Robin Wayne Bailey
- "Phoenix for the Amateur Chef" — G. Scott Huggins
- "Temple of Chaos" — Marian Allen
- "Admissions" — Michael H. Payne
- "An Old Dragon's Treasure" — Robert Lowell Russell
- "Liars' Tournament" — Pauline J. Alama
- "Grave Magic" — Stepan Chapman
- "The Piper's Wife" — Susan Murrie Macdonald
- "Four Paws to Light My Way" — Deborah Wheeler
- "Jewels in the Sand" — Catherine Soto
- "Death Among the Ruins" — Jonathan Shipley
- "Diplomacy in the Dark" — Suzan Harden
- "A Fairy Tale of Milk and Coffee" — L. S. Patton
- "Possibilities" — Julia H. West
- "Dark Speech" — Michael Spence and Elisabeth Waters

=== Sword and Sorceress 31 ===
2016. ISBN 978-1-938185-45-8. Edited by Elisabeth Waters.

- "Introduction" — Elisabeth Waters
- "Unicorn Heart" — Pauline J. Alama
- "Simplicity" — Marian Allen
- "Black Dust" — Robin Wayne Bailey
- "After The Swan Song" — Lorie Calkins
- "Lord Ruthven's Masque" — Stepan Chapman
- "Reading the Future" — Laura Davy
- "Pig-Headed" — Suzan Harden
- "Shiny in the Shallows" — Rose Hill
- "In Her Shoes" — Melissa Mead
- "Earth's Daughter" — Catherine Mintz
- "Beasts and Monsters" — Michael H. Payne
- "Sage Mountain" — Deborah Wheeler
- "Hot Milk Before Bed" — L. S. Patton
- "Tears of a Dead God" — Jonathan Shipley
- "The Sassy and the Naegg" — Dave Smeds
- "Tale-maker; Tale-spinner" — Pam Wallace
- "The Fountains of Karona" — Julia H. West

=== Sword and Sorceress 32 ===
2017. ISBN 978-1-938185-48-9. Edited by Elisabeth Waters.

- "Introduction" — Elisabeth Waters
- "The Sound of the Moon" — Robin Wayne Bailey
- "A Librarian in Distress" — Rose Strickman
- "Wight Nights" — Stepan Chapman
- "Unexpected" — Suzan Harden
- "The Nature of Wraiths" — Dave Smeds
- "Royal Daughters" — Elaine Cunningham
- "The Girl from Black Point Rock" — Deborah Wheeler
- "Shaman's Quest" — Kevin L. O'Brien
- "Save a Prayer" — Mercedes Lackey
- "Add a Cup of Terror" — Michael Spence and Elisabeth Waters
- "Deadly Questions" — Jonathan Shipley
- "Sky, Clouds, and Sonam" — Catherine Mintz
- "Hostages of Honeycomb" — Marian Allen
- "Woman's Work" — Pauline J. Alama
- "Authority Figures" — Michael H. Payne
- "Till the Cows Come Home" — L. S. Patton
- "Expiration Date" — Julia H. West
- "Finding Truth" — Lorie Calkins

=== Sword and Sorceress 33 ===
2018. ISBN 978-1-938185-58-8. Edited by Deborah Wheeler, Elisabeth Waters.

- "Introduction" — Deborah Wheeler
- "Wrestling the Ocean" — Pauline J. Alama
- "Haunted Book Nook" — Margaret L. Carter
- "The Hood and the Wood" — Lorie Calkins
- "Singing to Stone" — Catherine Mintz
- "The River Lady's Pale Hands" — M. P. Ericson
- "Lin's Hoard" — Deirdre M. Murphy
- "The Citadel in the Ice" — Dave Smeds
- "All in a Name" — Jessie D. Eaker
- "Death Everlasting" — Jonathan Shipley
- "Balancing Act" — Marella Sands
- "First Act of Saint Bastard" — T. R. North
- "The Fallen Man" — Deborah Wheeler
- "A Familiar's Predicament" — Jane Lindskold
- "The Secret Arm" — Jennifer Linnaea
- "Coming Home to Roost" — L. S. Patton
- "From the Mouths of Serpents" — Traci Castleberry (as Evey Brett)
- "Magic Words" — Alisa Cohen
- "Charming" — Melissa Mead

=== Sword and Sorceress 34 ===
2019. ISBN 978-1938185595. Edited by Elisabeth Waters.

- "Introduction" — Elisabeth Waters
- "The Captive in the Tower" — Pauline J. Alama
- "Chaos Heart" — Marian Allen
- "Tree of Souls and Jewels" — Robin Wayne Bailey
- "Controversial Knowledge" — Jane M. H. Bigelow
- "The Night Ward" — Stepan Chapman
- "Gnat" — Patricia B. Cirone
- "To Women Go" — Helen E. Davis
- "Trouble Follows Her" — Jessie D. Eaker
- "In Small Packages" — Mercedes Lackey
- "Miss Argent's School For Mislaid Maidens" — Melissa Mead
- "A Queen of Ice and Snow" — Kevin L. O'Brien
- "Guidance Counseling" — Michael H. Payne
- "Many Teeth" — Deborah Wheeler
- "A Rose by Any Other Name" — L. S. Patton
- "Death Most Royal" — Jonathan Shipley
- "The Quickening of the Barrens" — Dave Smeds
