= Anthropomorphization of animals =

Theme in mythology and folk tales

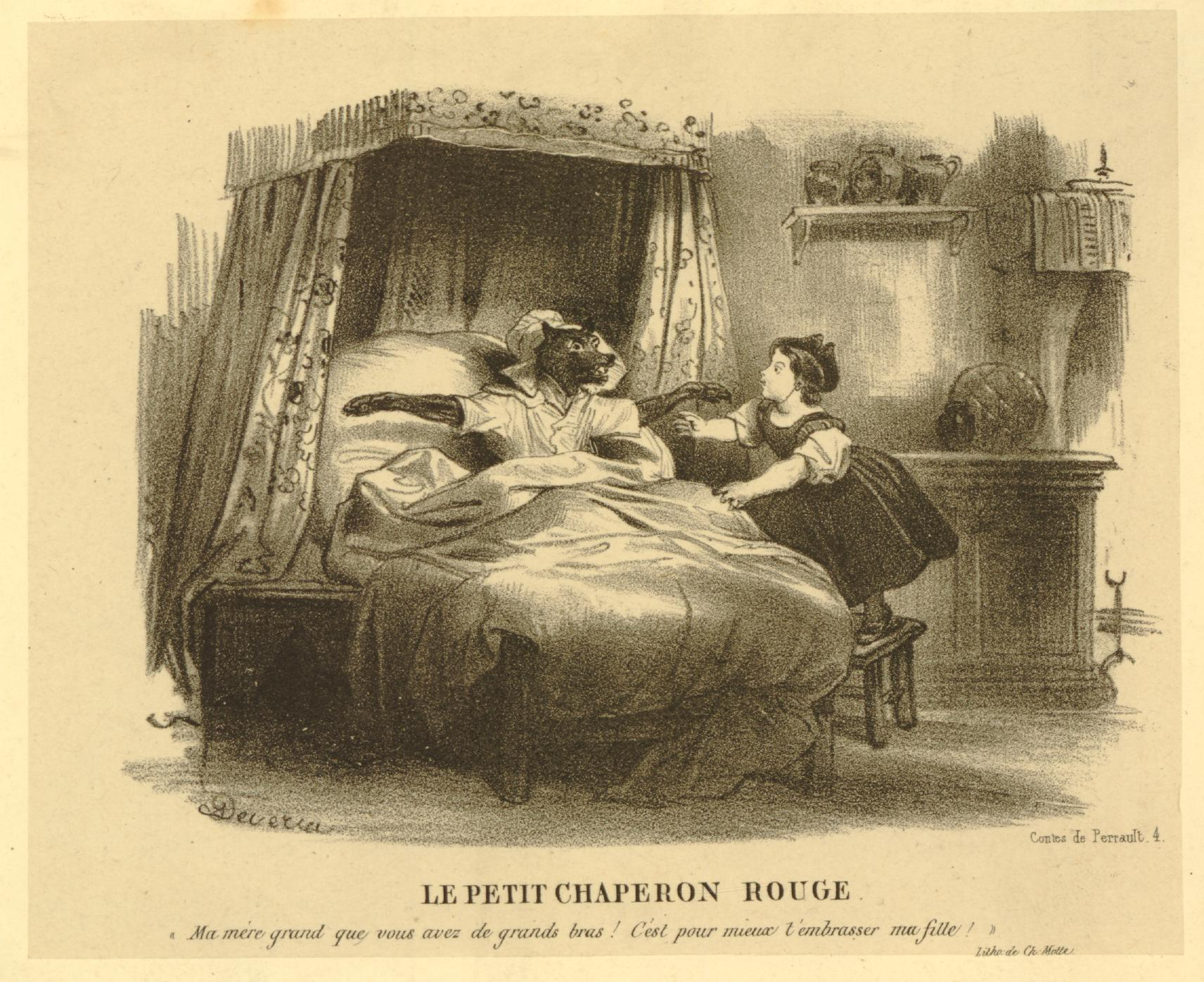
A 1830 print by Achille Devéria depicting the story of Little Red Riding Hood, where a child mistakes a wolf for her grandmother and converses with it.

Anthropomorphization of animals is a common element in mythology and folk tales, children's literature, and modern comic books and animated cartoons. These characters possess human-like qualities (such as bipedal walking, wearing clothes, talking, and living in houses). Whether they are realistic animals or fantastical ones, anthropomorphic animals serve a wide range of uses in literature, from teaching morality to providing social commentary. Realistic talking animals are often found in fables, religious texts, indigenous texts, coming of age stories set in the wilderness, naturalist fiction, animal autobiography, animal satire, and in works featuring pets and domesticated animals. Conversely, fantastical and more anthropomorphic animals are often found in the fairy tale, science fiction, and fantasy genres.

== Utility ==
The use of antropomorphic animals enables storytellers to combine the basic characteristics of the animal with human behavior, to apply metaphor, and to entertain children as well as adults. Animals are used in a variety of ways in fictional works including to illustrate morality lessons for children, to instill wonder in young readers, and as a tool for inserting social commentary. In addition talking animals can be utilized for satirical purposes, for humorous purposes like in the case of Frog and Toad, and to de-centralize and de-emphasize the human experience. Talking animals can also be used to create analogies or allegories. For example, in Narnia, Aslan the Lion can be seen as an allegory for Christ. Finally, some fictional works with talking animals challenge the human-animal divide and identify children as the members of society who take on the responsibility of being ecological/environmental changemakers.

== Talking realistic animals ==
In textual representations the creature retains its original form, other than being able to speak. Sometimes it may only speak as a narrator for the reader's convenience. The rabbits in Watership Down who, except for the ability to discuss their actions, behave exactly as normal rabbits, also come under this category, as do characters from animated films like Happy Feet and The Lion King.

=== Fables ===
The tradition of using talking animals in stories dates as far back as 550 BCE with the Greek Aesop’s Fables. The Panchatantra, a collection of Indian animal fables, is another early example. Both use talking animals for didactic purposes. More recent fables like Sarah Trimmer’s History of the Robins (1786) use talking animals to instruct children on how to behave in society as well as how to maintain the social order. They also reiterate the superiority of humans to animals which is why humans are responsible for caring for animals.

=== Animals in religious texts ===
In the Qur’ān, animals are seen as gifts from God and thus are meant to serve humans. Aside from a few animals being able to speak, they are never anthropomorphized, personified, or given names. There are only a handful of times that animals speak in the Qur’ān and most of these occurrences happen in relation to Solomon. For example, it is a hoopoe (a bird native to Africa, Asia, and Europe) that tells King Solomon of Queen Sheba’s idolatrous ways.

=== Native American/indigenous texts ===
In Native American mythology, animals are integral to human survival and thus a part of the Native American family/community. Distinctions between humans and animals are more fluid. In these stories animals represent the ability to adapt and serve as mentors and guides. For example, in Louise Erdrich’s book Chickadee the protagonist is saved by a Chickadee, who instructs him in finding food and water, after he escapes a kidnapping.

Other examples of Native American works with talking animal stories include How I Became a Ghost, Keepers of the Earth, and The Orphan and the Polar Bear, just to name a few.

=== Naturalist animal fiction ===
Animal fictions with more conservation-oriented themes allow young readers to engage with challenging messages at a safe distance. For example, Charlotte’s Web introduces the concept of death when Charlotte dies and Wilbur is charged with taking care of her offspring. Similarly, naturalist animal fictions also provide a vehicle with which to provide commentary on the humane treatment of animals, animal rights, and the conservation of animals. A good example of this would be the Doctor Doolittle series. Finally, in this digital age where modern childhood generally has very little contact and exposure to animals in the natural environment, naturalist animal fictions allow authors to portray natural animal behavior. For instance Bambi, both the 1928 novel and the Disney film, realistically portrays the life cycle of deer. The hunting dogs in the film adaptation do not talk.

=== Animal autobiography ===
Fictional works told from an animal’s perspective, like the horse in Black Beauty, encourage readers to empathize with animals. Furthermore, more generally they challenge the human-animal divide. Other examples of animal autobiographies include The Life and Perambulations of a Mouse (1783), The Biography of a Spaniel (1806), The Adventures of a Donkey (1815), The Curious Adventures of a Field Cricket (1881), and Thy Servant, a Dog (1930).

=== Animal satire ===
For some authors talking animals, rather than human characters, allowed them to publish their satirical commentary by protecting them from censure. Chaucer’s Canterbury Tales and Orwell’s Animal Farm are some of the most famous examples of this.

=== Contemporary fiction ===
Contemporary novels such as Alexis Wright's The Swan Book, Colin McAdam's A Beautiful Truth, Erin Hortle's The Octopus and I and Laura Jean McKay's The Animals in That Country show animal voices alongside human characters. These novels portray animals as equally deserving of a place in the narrative.

== Fantastical creatures ==
In the industries of illustration, cartooning, and animation, professionals refer to these types of creature characters as talking animals, funny animals, or anthropomorphic characters.

=== Fairy tales ===
The talking creature is perhaps the most common trait of fairy tales. The motif is certainly present in many more tales than fairies.

=== Fantasy ===
Anthropomorphism of animals is common in the fantasy genre. The popularity of talking animals in Western fantasy has fluctuated over time, with a new wave of animal stories appearing in the 1970s, but they became less common in subsequent decades.

=== Comics ===
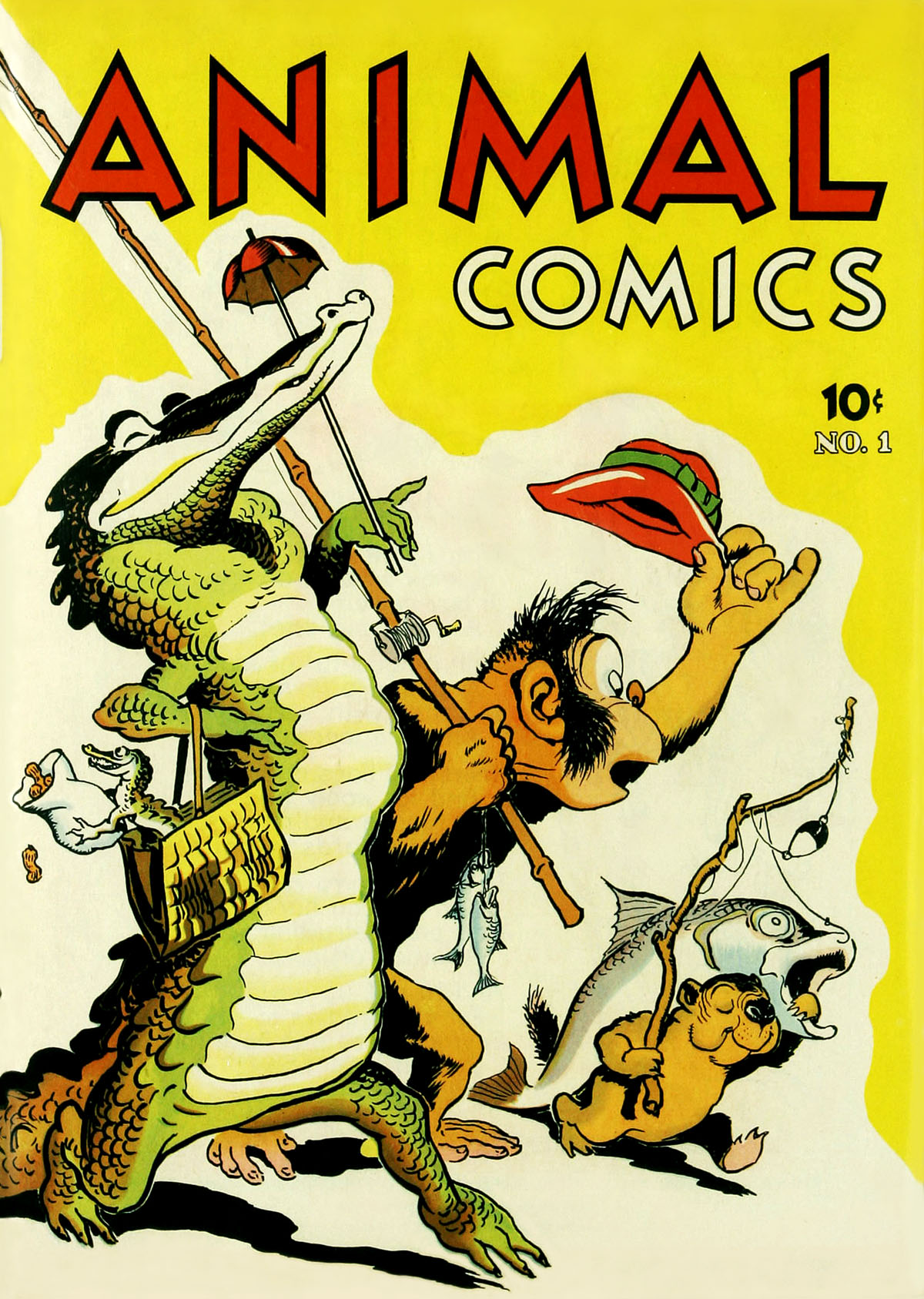
Dell's Animal Comics from the 1940s, whose cover features animals who behave like humans.

Funny animal comics feature non-human protagonists displaying anthropomorphic traits for humorous purposes. The term "funny animals" has been used since at least the early 1870s, with an American bookseller describing a book titled Pretty Picture and Pretty Rhymes which featured anthropomorphic animals. The authors of Animal Comics; Multispecies Storyworlds in Graphic Narratives (2017) described the style as "rampant" in comic strips in the first half of the 20th century.

Nicholas Labarre in Understanding Genres in Comics (2020) stated that Fawcett Publications preempted the style when they began publishing Funny Animals in December 1942 while the first dedicated funny animal comic books were likely Disney and Warner-based comics, such as Dell Comics Four Color series, which started with Donald Duck.

== See also ==
- Furry fandom
- Talking animal
- Uplift (science fiction)
