= Michael H. Payne =

American novelist

Michael H. Payne (born February 10, 1965) is an American science fiction and fantasy writer, cartoonist, and reviewer. He holds an M.A. in Classics from the University of California, Irvine, and has hosted the Darkling Eclectica, a radio program originally on Saturday mornings, now on Sunday afternoons, on KUCI for 40 years.

Payne's novel The Blood Jaguar (Tor Books, 1998) and most of his short stories utilize talking animal characters: his novelette "Crow's Curse" won third place in the Writers of the Future contest in 1991 and his short story "Familiars" won the Ursa Major Award in 2002. His cartoons as well, published in the New Horizons anthology from Shanda Fantasy Arts and on his websites, take animals, give them intelligence, and examine what sorts of multi-cultural societies they might form.

As a reviewer, Payne is a past contributor to Tangent magazine, both in its original print edition and in its early online form, and his capsule book reviews began appearing in 1999 on the website of the Science Fiction and Fantasy Writers of America before being moved in August 2009 to the "members only" section of the site's discussion forum. Payne is the head co-ordinator for SFWA's Circulating Book Plan and was named the 2013 recipient of the Kevin O'Donnell Jr. Service to SFWA award for his work on the Plan. He was the Registrar for the Web Cartoonists' Choice Awards and came in second in the Daily Grind Iron Man Challenge with his webcomic Daily Grind after 15 years of daily updates. He lives on the Balboa Peninsula in Newport Beach, California, where he works for the public library and is a cantor and guitar player at the local Catholic church.

== Bibliography ==
- "Rat's Reputation," short story, FurVersion #16, 05/89; reprinted on the tomorrowsf web site, 04/97; reprinted again in the Best of Show anthology from Sofawolf Press, 07/03
- "Crow's Curse," novelette, third prize winner, Writers of the Future contest, printed in volume VII of their anthology, 08/91; reprinted in volume I of the Best of the Writers of the Future, 09/00
- "River Man," short story, Asimov's Science Fiction, 08/93; tied for third place, Asimov's Readers’ Award; honorable mention, Year's Best SF; translated into Russian in Esli, 08/07; reprinted in the Already Among Us anthology from Legion Printing, 07/12
- "A Bag of Custard," short story, Asimov's Science Fiction, 02/94; honorable mention, Year's Best SF
- "One Thin Dime," short story, Tomorrow Speculative Fiction, 10/94; honorable mention, Year's Best SF; reprinted in the anthology Dragons, 12/95
- "My Vampire Cat, or Whatever", short story, Tomorrow Speculative Fiction, 06/95; preliminary nominee, Theodore Sturgeon Memorial Award, 1996; honorable mention, Year's Best SF
- "Painting the Roses Red," short story, Tomorrow Speculative Fiction, 08/95; honorable mention, Year's Best SF
- "Why I'm Traveling With a Talking Cow," short story, Marion Zimmer Bradley's Fantasy Magazine, Winter 1996
- "How the First Question Mark was Built," short story, Tomorrow Speculative Fiction, 08/96
- "Rat's Reckoning," novelette, on the tomorrowsf web site, 06/97
- "The Language of Ghosts," short story, Asimov's Science Fiction, 08/97; tied for 6th place, Asimov's Readers’ Award; honorable mention, Year's Best SF
- "Kily's Kindling," novelette, on the tomorrowsf web site, 08/97
- "Cold, Cold Ground," short story, Mythagoras, Summer 1997
- The Blood Jaguar, serialized novel on the tomorrowsf web site; Tor Books 12/98; honorable mention, 1999 William L. Crawford Award for best first fantasy novel; preliminary ballot, 1999 Nebula Awards; reprinted in an illustrated edition from Sofawolf Press, 06/12
- Terebinth, serialized graphic novel in 1930s black and white Sunday comics style, beginning in YARF! #57, 06/99; reprinted on the Chimerical Comics web site, 05/01 through 07/02; now appearing once a week;
- "A Hop, a Skip, and a Jump," short story, Morphic Tales, Cornwuff Press, 01/00
- "Mange," short story, Anthrolations #2, 05/00
- "Fame? Fortune? Chocolate?", non-fiction article, Writers of the Future anthology, volume XVI, 09/00
- "Canis Major", short story, Anthrolations #4, 08/01; reprinted in the Best of Show anthology from Sofawolf Press
- "St. Georgie and the Dragonfly", comic book story, Part 1 in New Horizons #11, anthology series published by Shanda Fantasy Arts, 10/01; Part 2 in New Horizons #12, 04/02
- "Familiars," short story, Sword and Sorceress series #19, 01/02; winner of the 2003 Ursa Major Award for Best Anthropomorphic Short Story; reprinted in the Ursa Major Awards anthology from Furplanet, 06/12
- "The Moon Rabbit," short story, Artemis magazine, Spring 2002
- "The Celery Stalks at Midnight," comic book story, Part 1 in New Horizons #13, anthology series published by Shanda Fantasy Arts, 07/02
- "Oh, Won't You Come Over," short-short, Anthrocon 2002 program book, 07/02
- "Law and Justice," short story, Blackgate #5, Spring 2003
- "Three Ladies," short story, Claw and Quill, 10/04
- Daily Grind, webcomic series
- "Squirrel Errant," short story, Further Confusion program book, 01/06; Sword and Sorceress series #23, 11/08
- "More Than Cute," review of the webcomic Count Your Sheep, The Webcomics Examiner, 03/06
- "The New Cute," webcomics review, The Webcomics Examiner, 08/06
- "Why They Call Me Mr. Goddamn Happy," short story, Helix SF, Winter 2007
- "Days of Future Pissed," review of the webcomic S.S.D.D, Comixtalk, 04/07
- review of the webcomic Tales of the Questor, Comixtalk, 05/07
- "A World of Fantasy," article on multiple fantasy webcomics, Comixtalk, 06/07
- "Lady Raven and the Falcon Prince," short story, New Fables #1, Sofawolf Press, Summer 2007
- "Out of the Inkwell: Print Comics Now on the Web," review of Girl Genius, Finder, Xeno's Arrow, and Galaxion, Comixtalk, 09/07
- "In Search of Vanished Webcomics," article on various stopped, ended, or lost webcomics, Comixtalk, 01/08
- "Le Cute Nouveau," webcomic review, ComixTalk, 04/08
- "A Burgeoning Apparatus," review of the webcomics College Roomies from Hell and Clan of the Cats, Comixtalk, 08/08
- "Surreal Estate," review of several surrealist webcomics, Comixtalk, 09/08
- "The Super Secret Origin of She-Man," short story, Helix SF, Fall 2008
- "Mixed Media and Metaphors," review of the webcomic Love Puppets, Polu Texni, 12/08
- review of the webcomic Tile, Strange Horizons, 10/09
- "-ology", poem, 1st place, Helen Schaible sonnet contest, 10/09
- "Three on a Match", short story, Sword and Sorceress series #24, 11/09
- review of webcomics by Jessica McLeod and Edward J. Grug III, Strange Horizons, 01/10
- "Matriculation", short story, Sword and Sorceress series #25, 11/10
- review of My Little Pony: Friendship is Magic, Strange Horizons, 05/11
- Half the Day is Night, a My Little Pony: Friendship is Magic fan novel, serialized at Equestria Daily, 03/11 - 07/11
- "The Raw and the Cooked," short story, Sword and Sorceress series #26, 11/11
- "Thoughts on Early Spring," short story, Bronies anthology, Kazka Press, 06/12
- "Airs Above the Ground," short story, Sword and Sorceress series #27, 11/12
- "In the Bleak Midwinter," short-short story, At Year's End anthology, Kazka Press, 12/12
- "Married to the Sea," short story, California Cantata anthology, Kazka Press, 03/13
- "Immolation," novelette, What Happens Next anthology, Furplanet Books, 07/13
- "Where There's Smoke," short story, Sword and Sorceress series #28, 11/13
- "Mendacity," short story, Sword and Sorceress series #29, 11/14
- "Admissions," short story, Sword and Sorceress series #30, 11/15
- "Beasts and Monsters," short story, Sword and Sorceress series #31, 11/16
- "Authority Figures," short story, Sword and Sorceress series #32, 11/17
- "Ode to the Artistic Temperament," poem, Silver Blade magazine #42, 05/19; tied for 3rd place, Long Form, Rhysling Award 2020
- "Guidance Counseling," short story, Sword and Sorceress series #34, 11/19
- "Never Work With Animals," novelette co-written with Neal Shusterman, Gleanings: Stories from the Arc of a Scythe, 11/22
- "Collaborators," short story, Cosmic Roots and Eldritch Shores, 12/24, nominated for the 2025 WSFA Small Press Award
