= Kathryne Kennedy =

American novelist

- Occupation: Author
- Writing career
- Language: English
- Genres: Paranormal romance Historical fiction
- Website: kathrynekennedy.com

Kathryne Kennedy is an American paranormal romance and historical fiction writer.

== Publishing career ==
Kennedy's mother published several romances, inspiring her daughter to do the same. Kennedy grew up with a love of fantasy and romance, and eventually decided to combine the two genres. She began by writing mainly short stories in speculative fiction, and was able to publish one story, Spirit Quest, in the 1996 edition of Marion Zimmer Bradley's Sword and Sorceress series (a fantasy anthology). Kennedy made her publishing debut with Beneath the Thirteen Moons in 2003, and Five Star Press (Gale) published it in hardcover in 2010; Kennedy decided to focus on historical fiction soon after the novel's initial publication date.

Kennedy wrote His American Heiress, which led to the historical paranormal romance Enchanting the Lady, a novel that integrated historical fiction with magical elements. Lady was the first novel in the Relics of Merlin series, which has earned acclaim from critical circles; Publishers Weekly called it "simply delightful", and best-selling writer Eloisa James referred to the series as "really fun and imaginative". The series includes Enchanting the Lady (2008), Double Enchantment (2008), and Enchanting the Beast (2009). Throughout her career Kennedy has also been published in various magazines.

== Personal life ==
Kennedy was born in Florida. She currently resides in Arizona with her husband and two sons. She is a member of the Romance Writers of America. In July 2011, Kennedy attended the annual RWA conference which focused on how a lady of the Victorian era would have dressed (and undressed).

== Works ==
The Elven Lords
The Fire Lord's Lover (2010)
The Lady of the Storm (2011)
The Lord of Illusion (2012)
The Assassin's Lover (2015)

The Relics of Merlin
Enchanting the Lady (2008)
Double Enchantment (2008)
Enchanting the Beast (2009)
Everlasting Enchantment (2013)

Individual novels
Beneath the Thirteen Moons (2003)
My Unfair Lady (2009)

Short fiction
Roommates (1995)
Spirit Quest (1996)
Last Encounter (1997)
