= Bud Webster =

American novelist

- Born: Clarence Howard Webster; July 27, 1952
- Died: February 13, 2016 (aged 63)
- Citizenship: American
- Spouse: Mary Horton
- Writing career
- Genres: science-fiction, fantasy

Clarence Howard "Bud" Webster (July 27, 1952 – February 13, 2016) was an American science fiction and fantasy writer who is also known for his essays on both the history of science fiction and sf/fantasy anthologies as well. He is known for the Bubba Pritchert series, which won two Analytical Laboratory readers' awards from Analog Science Fiction and Fact magazine. Farewell Blues was featured on the cover of the January/February 2015 issue of The Magazine of Fantasy & Science Fiction. Webster is also known for his survey of Groff Conklin's contribution to science fiction in 41 Above the Rest: An Index and Checklist for the Anthologies of Groff Conklin.

Webster was a contributing editor and columnist for the Science Fiction and Fantasy Writers of America Bulletin and published a collection of those columns titled Anthropology 101: Reflections, Inspections and Dissections of SF Anthologies through Merry Blacksmith Press. His Bulletin column, "Anthropology 101", examines the history of science fiction and fantasy through classic anthologies and anthologists, frequently pairing books by different editors but also presenting two or more books by the same anthologist. The column has included multi-installment pieces on Frederik Pohl, Robert Silverberg, Harry Harrison and more recently, Terry Carr. In addition, he has co-wrote three Bulletin articles with Dr. Jerry Pournelle. He was also a frequent contributor to the "Curiosity" page of The Magazine of Fantasy & Science Fiction. He was the poetry editor and columnist for Helix SF, an online speculative fiction quarterly. After Helix SF ceased publication, he took his column, "Past Masters", to Jim Baen's Universe, and when that closed, to Eric Flint's Grantville Gazette. The "Past Masters" columns are retrospective appraisals of so-called "classic" science fiction and fantasy authors, and include extensive bibliographies. Some of the authors covered in the "Past Masters" series include Zenna Henderson, Fredric Brown, Edgar Pangborn, and Murray Leinster.

Webster was poetry editor at Black Gate, a print fantasy magazine, for which he also wrote a column about little-known authors titled "Who?!" The only one of the columns appeared in Black Gate 15 and discussed author Tom Reamy.

In 2007, the Science Fiction and Fantasy Writers of America (SFWA) appointed Webster Estates Liaison, placing him in charge of their Estates Project, which makes it possible for publishers to contact the agents or individuals who represent the literary estates of deceased science-fiction and fantasy writers so that material by those authors can be reprinted. The Estates database currently contains information on more than 450 sf/fantasy authors.

In March 2012, SFWA announced that Webster would be given their Service to SFWA Award at the Nebula Awards banquet in May for his work on the SFWA Estates Project.

In June 2013, Merry Blacksmith Press published a collection of Webster's essays about science fiction and fantasy authors and books titled Past Masters and Other Bookish Natterings, including articles on Clifford D. Simak. R. A. Lafferty, Judith Merril and others. This volume also includes short-short essays originally published in The Magazine of Fantasy and Science Fiction as part of their "Curiosities" column, as well as three articles co-written with Jerry Pournelle.

Webster was also a collector of science fiction books, and is the author of The Joy of Booking: Webster's Guide to Buying and Selling Used SF and Fantasy Books.

== Personal life ==
Webster was born in Roanoke, Virginia to Edna Urquhart Webster and Clarence H. Webster. He attended Crystal Spring Elementary, Woodrow Wilson Junior High and Patrick Henry high schools. In 1970 he graduated from Hermitage High School in Richmond. He studied music at Virginia Commonwealth University, majoring in composition. He was active in the Richmond music scene in the 1970s and 1980s performing in several bands, writing music reviews for various free newspapers, working as disc jockey on local radio, and managing a used record store. He also produced the CD Not Necessarily Serious of original folk-rock music by Richmond musician-songwriter Christie Oglesby in 2000. Raised a Baptist, he subsequently became an agnostic. At the time of his death, he was living in Richmond, Virginia, with his long-time companion, Mary Horton; whom he married May 26, 2013.

== Bibliography ==
=== Short fiction ===
Title	Year	First published	Reprinted/collected	Notes
Bringing it all back home	2007	Webster, Bud (Jul–Aug 2007). "Bringing it all back home". Analog Science Fiction and Fact. 127 (7&8).		Bubba Pritchert series
Triumph in the desert	2003	Webster, Bud (Jul–Aug 2003). "Triumph in the desert". Analog Science Fiction and Fact. 123 (7&8).		Bubba Pritchert series
Bubba Pritchert and the space aliens	1994	Webster, Bud (Jul 1994). "Bubba Pritchert and the space aliens". Analog Science Fiction and Fact.		Bubba Pritchert series
The three labors of Bubba	1996	Webster, Bud (Jun 1996). "The three labors of Bubba". Analog Science Fiction and Fact. 116 (7).		Bubba Pritchert series

=== Critical studies and reviews of Webster's work ===
- Kooistra, Jeffery D. (April 2014). "Bud Webster and the Past Masters". The Alternate View. Analog Science Fiction and Fact. 134 (4): 41–43.

=== Interviews ===
- Rambo, Cat (April 2014). "Bud Webster". In Conversation. Analog Science Fiction and Fact. 134 (4): 44–45.
