= Stephanie Shaver =

American fantasy writer and video game developer

Stephanie Diane Shaver
- Pictured in 2007
- Born: 1975 (age 50–51)
- Occupations: Author, video game developer
- Writing career
- Genre: Fantasy

Stephanie Diane Shaver (born 1975) is an American fantasy writer and video game developer.

She sold her first professional short story to Marion Zimmer Bradley's Sword and Sorceress series when she was 13. Her work has also been featured in various Valdemar anthologies, edited by Mercedes Lackey.

She is an active member of Science Fiction and Fantasy Writers of America (SFWA) and has also been a member of the Authors Guild. She gives talks about being a professional writer at fan conventions such as Dragon*Con and Archon. She worked for over a year at Marion Zimmer Bradley's Fantasy Magazine and was involved in two "Fantasy Worlds" Festivals as part of the committee and served as the program book editor.

In 2009, Shaver moved from St. Louis, Missouri to California. In St. Louis, she had worked as a game designer for Simutronics, serving as lead designer on Hero's Journey and contributing to DragonRealms.

== Works ==
=== Valdemar ===
- "Blood Ties" – Sword of Ice and Other Tales of Valdemar, 1997, Mercedes Lackey (ed.) ISBN 0-88677-720-8
- "Starhaven" – Sun in Glory and Other Tales of Valdemar, 2003, Mercedes Lackey (ed.) ISBN 0-7564-0166-6
- "Safe and Sound" – Crossroads and Other Tales of Valdemar, 2005, Mercedes Lackey (ed.) ISBN 0-7564-0325-1
- "Midwinter Gifts" – Changing the World: All-New Tales of Valdemar 2009, Mercedes Lackey (ed.) ISBN 978-0756405809

=== Other stories ===
- "At the Tolling of Midnight" – Sword and Sorceress VII, 1990, Marion Zimmer Bradley (ed.) ISBN 0-88677-457-8
- "Shards of Crystal" – Sword and Sorceress VIII, 1991, Marion Zimmer Bradley (ed.) ISBN 0-88677-486-1
- "Winterwood" – Sword & Sorceress IX, 1993, Marion Zimmer Bradley (ed.)
- "Her Mother's Sword" – Sword & Sorceress X, 1993, Marion Zimmer Bradley (ed.)
- "Ancient Warrior" – Sword & Sorceress XI, 1994, Marion Zimmer Bradley (ed.) 1994
- "Promise to Angel" – Sword & Sorceress XII, 1995, Marion Zimmer Bradley (ed.)
- "Circle of Ashes" – Lammas Night, 1996, Mercedes Lackey, ed. ISBN 0-671-87713-5
- "Jewel-Bright" – Sword & Sorceress XIII, 1996, Marion Zimmer Bradley (ed.)
- "Empty Jar, Empty Chest" – 100 Wicked Witch Stories, 2003, Stefan R. Dziemianowicz, Robert A. Weinberg & Martin H. Greenberg (ed.) ISBN 1-4027-0976-5
- "Broken Bones" – Moving Targets, 2008, Mercedes Lackey (ed.)
