= The Power of the Land =

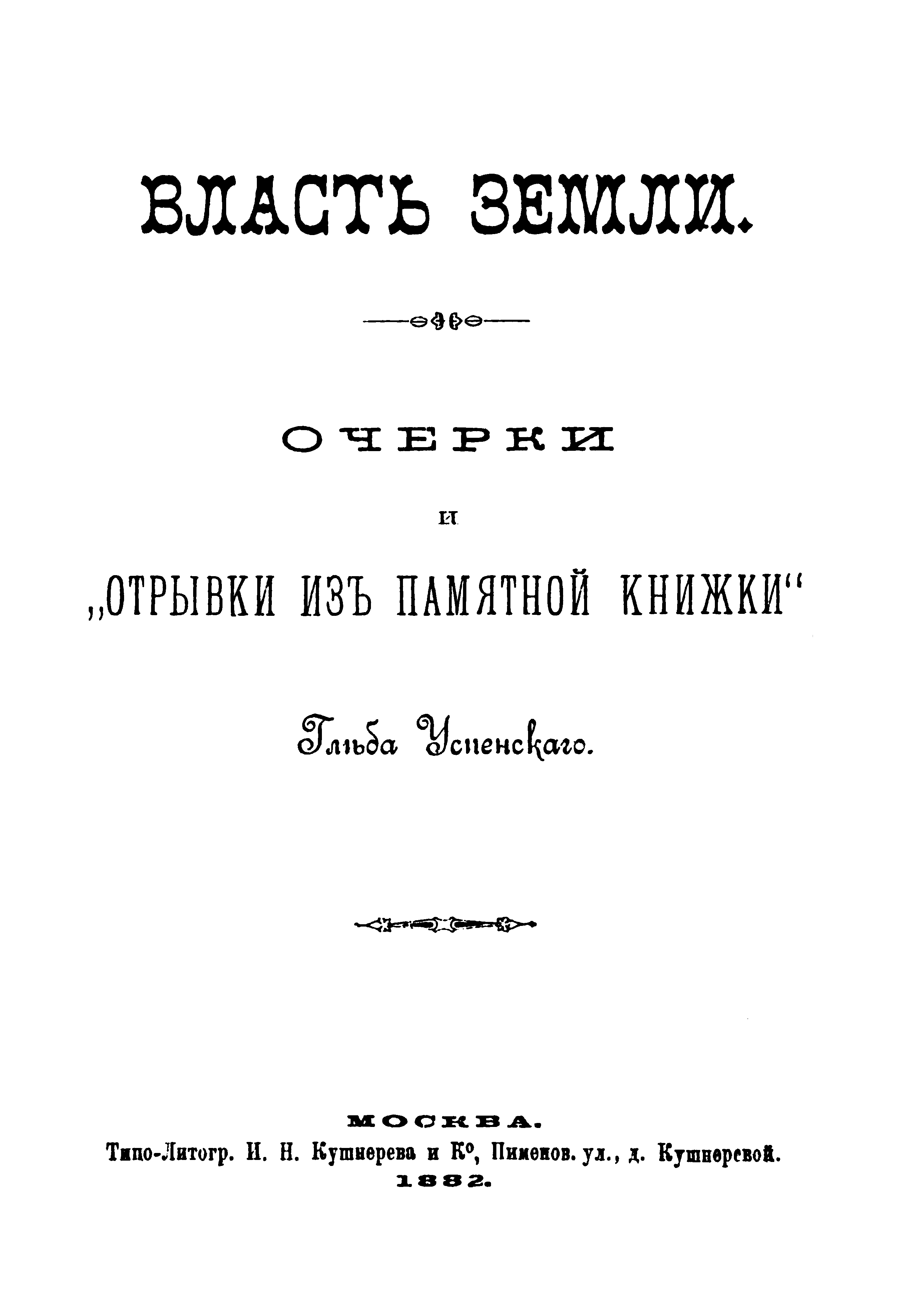
- 1882 title page
- Author: Gleb Uspensky
- Original title: Власть земли
- Language: Russian
- Publisher: Otechestvennye Zapiski
- Publication date: 1882
- Publication place: Russian Empire
- Media type: Print (hardback & paperback)
- Preceded by: Peasant and Peasant's Labour (1880)

The Power of the Land (Russian: Власть земли, romanized: Vlast zemli) is a collection of sketches by Gleb Uspensky, first published in Otechestvennye zapiski, Nos. 1-3, 1882. Followed by heated discussion in the Russian press, it was praised by liberals and panned by conservatives. In retrospect the book is regarded as Uspensky's major work.

== Background ==
In September 1881 Gleb Uspensky purchased a house in the Syabrintsy village in the Chudovo region of Novgorod Governorate. It was there that in November 1881-March 1882 that he wrote the cycle of sketches, mixing fiction and non-fiction, based on his observations of the rural life in provincial Russia. Thematically and ideologically it became a sequel to his earlier work, Peasant and Peasant's Labour (Крестьянин и крестьянский труд, 1880) in which he analyzed the ways in which the working of the land had formed Russian peasant's character and mindset.

== History ==
Later in 1882 the 12 stories, united by the main character Ivan Bosykh, were re-issued and published in another compilation, also titled The Power of The Land, with five new stories added. All the original sketches here too were given titles (while in the magazine version they were marked by numbers I-XII). Censor Nazarevsky has given The Power of the Land a negative review, stating that it "was certain to have a negative effect upon the readership, with its predictions of imminent catastrophe." By the end of the year, though, the permission for the publication was received.

Uspensky attributed great importance to The Power of the Land. Drawing parallels with Émile Zola's Terra novel, he wrote to translator and publisher V.E.Genkel on 13 February 1888. "You see, the real power [of the land] here belongs to the people. My concept of the Land is not as crude and cynical as that of Zola. He mixes the two modes of life, as indeed they have been mixed in the European countries: people living off the land, making money. In Russia it is different: you're either on land without money, or with money but without land."

== Concept ==
The general idea of Uspensky's work is that the life of Russian peasantry is determined by what he terms as "the power of the land," which it is totally dependent upon and is being given a very special mindset by. Once a peasant gets rooted out of his soil, his world collapses, Uspensky argued. The reason behind the economic and moral crisis of Russian peasantry, according to Uspensky, was that after the 1861 land reform it ended up with less land than it had in the times of serfdom. He pointed at other causes too for rural Russia's demise: the emergence of the new possibilities for making easy money, and the shrinking down of rural intelligentsia, which, after the reform, became the 'hired force', serving the exploiters, not the people. Unlike the narodnik theoreticians like Pyotr Lavrov and Nikolai Mikhailovsky, and authors like Nikolai Zlatovratsky, Uspensky thought little of the 'Russian people's spirit' or the ideals of obshchina. Some Soviet scholars later referred to his analytical method as 'metaphysical materialism'.

Uspensky was one of the first to document the emergence of rural proletariat in Russia. Having no sympathy for it whatsoever, he never considered its emergence as something inevitable, thinking this to be the result of insensitive administrative decisions, made with total disregard for Russian history and traditions. While harshly criticizing the poorest peasantry for its fatalistic nature-worshipping and the low efficiency of labour, he still regarded "the power of the land" an eternal, irremovable factor in the life of Russian peasantry.

== Critical reception ==
The conservative Russian press reviewed negatively The Power of the Land, accusing the author of "wallowing in pigsties." Pyotr Schebalsky in Russky Vestnik (April 1882 issue), compared Uspensky's prose unfavourably to the fiction of Russian aristocrat writers, calling the latter "the bel étage" of Russian literature. Uspensky responded with the "Suspicious Bel étage" article. Most of the critics of the liberal camp, including Alexander Pypin and Konstantin Arsenyev (both writing in Vestnik Evropy), praised the book. The narodniks, having divided by this time into several warring factions, took the book ambivalently. Some, like Leonid Obolensky (Russkoye Bogatstvo, March 1883) and Semyon Vengerov (Nedelya, No.5, 1882), while recognising the literary merits of Uspensky's work, condemned the author for his treatment of the narodnik's ideals. Still, in retrospect, the most objective and thorough analysis of the book has been provided by the two narodniks, Mikhail Protopopov (Delo, 1882, No.7) and Alexander Skabichevsky (Ustoyi, 1882, No.2).

In his 1887 article "Gleb Uspensky", Georgy Plekhanov praised the insightful realism of both Peasant And Peasant's Labour and The Power of the Land. "The most shrewd, intelligent and gifted of all the narodnik authors… set out to show us 'the real side of narodnik case', [Uspensky] gradually, without even noticing, signed death sentence to narodnitchestvo with all the programs and 'practical projects' associated with it," he wrote. According to Plekhanov, Uspensky's works were indispensable for the Russian Marxists in their struggle against the narodniks' doctrine.

== English translation ==
- "Ivan Petrov" (sketch from The Power of the Land), from Anthology of Russian Literature, Leo Wiener, G. P. Putnam's Sons, 1903. from Archive.org
