= Helix SF =

Helix SF was a quarterly American speculative fiction online magazine edited by William Sanders and Lawrence Watt-Evans. The poetry editor was Bud Webster.

== History ==
Sanders began the magazine in 2006 as "a place where writers could publish things that none of the regular markets wanted to touch" without any attempt "to be a commercial publication." The venture was supported entirely by reader donations, though Sanders emphasized in his first editorial that the intention was to make Helix SF "a professional-quality online magazine." The magazine was not open to general submissions.

Each issue of Helix SF featured 7 stories, 4 to 6 poems, several regular columns, and editorials by both the editors.

== Rejection controversy and closing ==
In 2008, Sanders wrote a rejection letter for a submission to Helix SF in which he called Muslims "sheet heads", "worm brained" and "incapable of honesty." Sanders would later deny that he was referring to Muslims as a whole. However, the controversy ultimately resulted in several authors asking to pull their stories from the Helix archives after they found out Sanders had offered that option to N.K. Jemisin.

In response to the controversy, Sanders announced that the magazine's fall 2008 issue would be the last. Sanders stated that "Perhaps the biggest one is the ongoing failure to develop a broad support base. Not that we've ever hurt for money — we've always been able to pay the writers, if not pro rates, at least considerably better than the average free webzine - but as things have turned out, the support has come mainly from a small number of amazingly generous donors, rather than over a wide range of the readership." On January 1, 2009, the Helix archives were removed from the web and replaced with an explanation for the magazine's demise and links to several of the stories at other locations. Sanders then deleted the magazine's website.

== Critical reception and awards ==
According to The Encyclopedia of Science Fiction, Helix SF was "generally praised for the quality of its fiction and poetry." The magazine was also noted for having almost half the published stories written by women, perhaps the only genre magazine of the time to do this.

The magazine was nominated for the 2008 Hugo Award for Best Semiprozine. Works published in the magazine won and were finalists for a number of awards. These include:

- "Captive Girl" by Jennifer Pelland, published in the Fall 2006 issue, was a finalist for the 2007 Nebula Award for Best Short Story;
- "Thirteen Ways of Looking at a Black Hole" by Lawrence Schimel, published in the Winter 2007 issue, took the 3rd place in the 2007 Rhysling Award in the short poem category;
- "The Button Bin" by Mike Allen, published in the Fall 2007 issue, was a finalist for the 2008 Nebula Award for Best Short Story.
- "Search" by Geoffrey A. Landis, published in the Fall 2008 issue, won the long form Rhysling Award in 2009.

== Authors published ==
Authors published in Helix SF included Jayme Lynn Blaschke, Bruce Boston, Adam-Troy Castro, Melanie Fletcher, Esther Friesner, Janis Ian, N. K. Jemisin, Jay Lake, Vera Nazarian, Michael H. Payne, Peg Robinson, Jane Yolen, and Steven H Silver.
