= Nikolai Naumov =

Russian writer

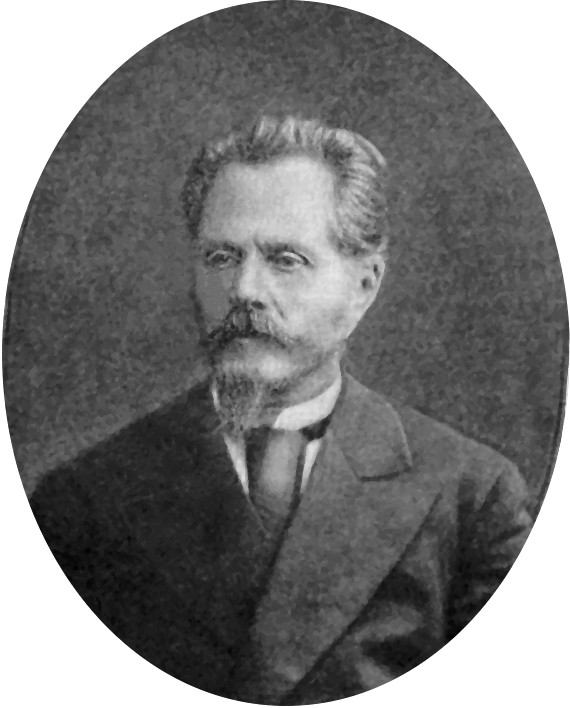
- Naumov, c. 1880
- Born: 28 May 1838; Tobolsk, Russian Empire
- Died: 22 December 1901 (aged 63); Tomsk, Russian Empire

Nikolai Ivanovich Naumov (Russian: Никола́й Ива́нович Нау́мов; 28 May 1838 – 22 December 1901) was a Russian writer.

== Biography ==
He studied at Saint Petersburg University, and in 1859 his works began to be published in local papers. In 1861 he participated in student disturbances associated with reforms in the Russian empire, for which he was expelled from the University. He moved to Siberia, where in 1863 he held minor posts in government departments. Some of his works were published in the journal Sovremennik.

Nikolai's works were mainly related to the subject of Siberian peasants after the Emancipation reform of 1861. Critics say that he shared populist views on the peasant commune. Among his most famous works are the collection of short stories and essays Strength Breaks the Straw (1874), and the collections of essays Cobweb (1880), Mountain Idyll and Sarbyska.

In 1897, in Saint Petersburg, his collected works were published in two volumes. He died in Tomsk in 1901.
