= Catharina Smith =

English novelist and actress

Catherine Smith (or Catherina Smith) was an English novelist and actress, best known for her gothic fiction. Almost all that is known of her is that she came from a wealthy family, and had acted at the Haymarket Theatre in London.

== Novels ==
- The Misanthrope Father, or The Guarded Secret (1807)
- The Castle of Arragon: or, The Banditti of the Forest (1809; Worldcat)
- The Caledonian Bandit or The Heir of Duncaethal (1811; WorldCat)
- Barozzi; or, The Venetian Sorceress (1815) (Internet Archive; WorldCat; Valancourt Books edition ISBN 978-0-9766048-7-7)
