= Pariksha Guru =

1882 Indian Hindi novel

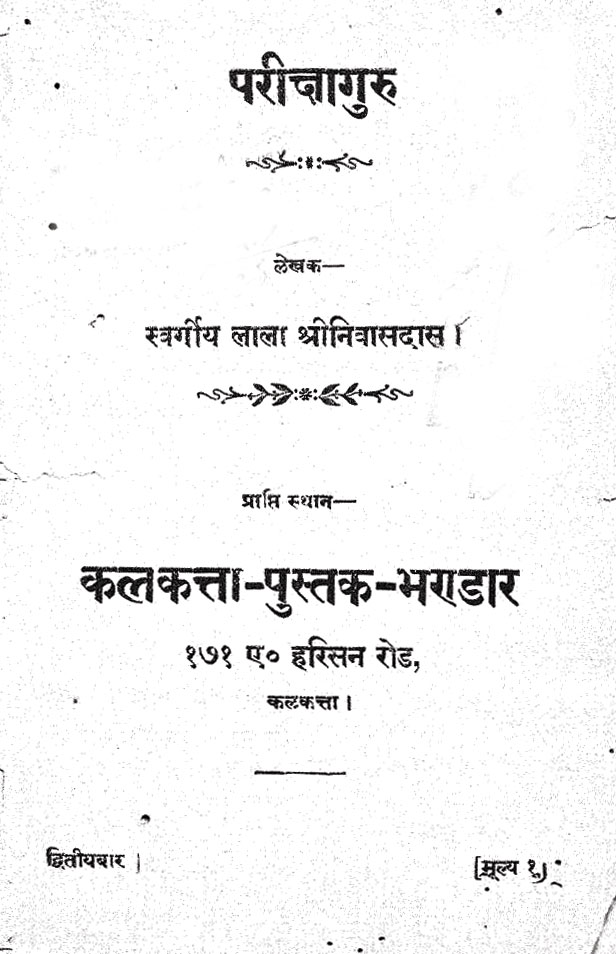
- Title page of the second edition
- Author: Lala Srinivas Das
- Original title: परीक्षागुरू
- Language: Hindi
- Genre: Novel
- Published: 25 November 1882
- Publication place: India
- Media type: Print (Paperback)
- Pages: 309
- Original text: परीक्षागुरू at Hindi Wikisource

Pariksha Guru is a novel in Hindi. It was written by Lala Srinivas Das and was published in 1882. It was reprinted in 1974 with an introduction by Ramdaras Mishra.

== About ==
Pariksha Guru was the first modern Hindi novel. It cautioned young men of well-to-do families against the dangerous influence of bad company and consequent loose morals. Pariksha Guru reflects the inner and outer world of the newly emerging Middle class. The characters are caught in the difficulty of adapting to colonial society while preserving their cultural identity. Although it was apparently written purely for the 'pleasure of reading'. The world of colonial modernity seems both frightening and irresistible.

The novel tries to teach the reader the 'right way' of living and expects all sensible men to be worldly wise and practical, to remain rooted in the values of their own tradition and culture, and to live with dignity and honor. The characters attempt to bridge two different worlds through their actions; they take to new agricultural technology, modernize trading practices, change the use of Indian languages making them capable of adopting both Western sciences and Indian wisdom. The young are urged to cultivate the healthy habit of reading newspapers. All this must be achieved without sacrificing traditional values.

== Adaptation ==
Pariksha Guru, a television show based on the novel was broadcast on Doordarshan's DD National, the Indian national public broadcaster, and was scripted by writer Amit Kumar.
