= Les Jeux des Jeunes Garçons =

1815 book

- Language: French
- Publication date: 1810
- Publication place: France
- OCLC: 50724074

Les jeux des jeunes garçons : représentés par un grand nombre d'estampes, accompagnées de l'explication des règles, de fables inédites et d'anecdotes ("Young Boys' Games") is the first book known to have rules relating to a game similar to baseball. It was first published circa 1810. It described the game "poisoned ball".
