= Barozzi; or, The Venetian Sorceress =

1805 novel by Catherine Smith

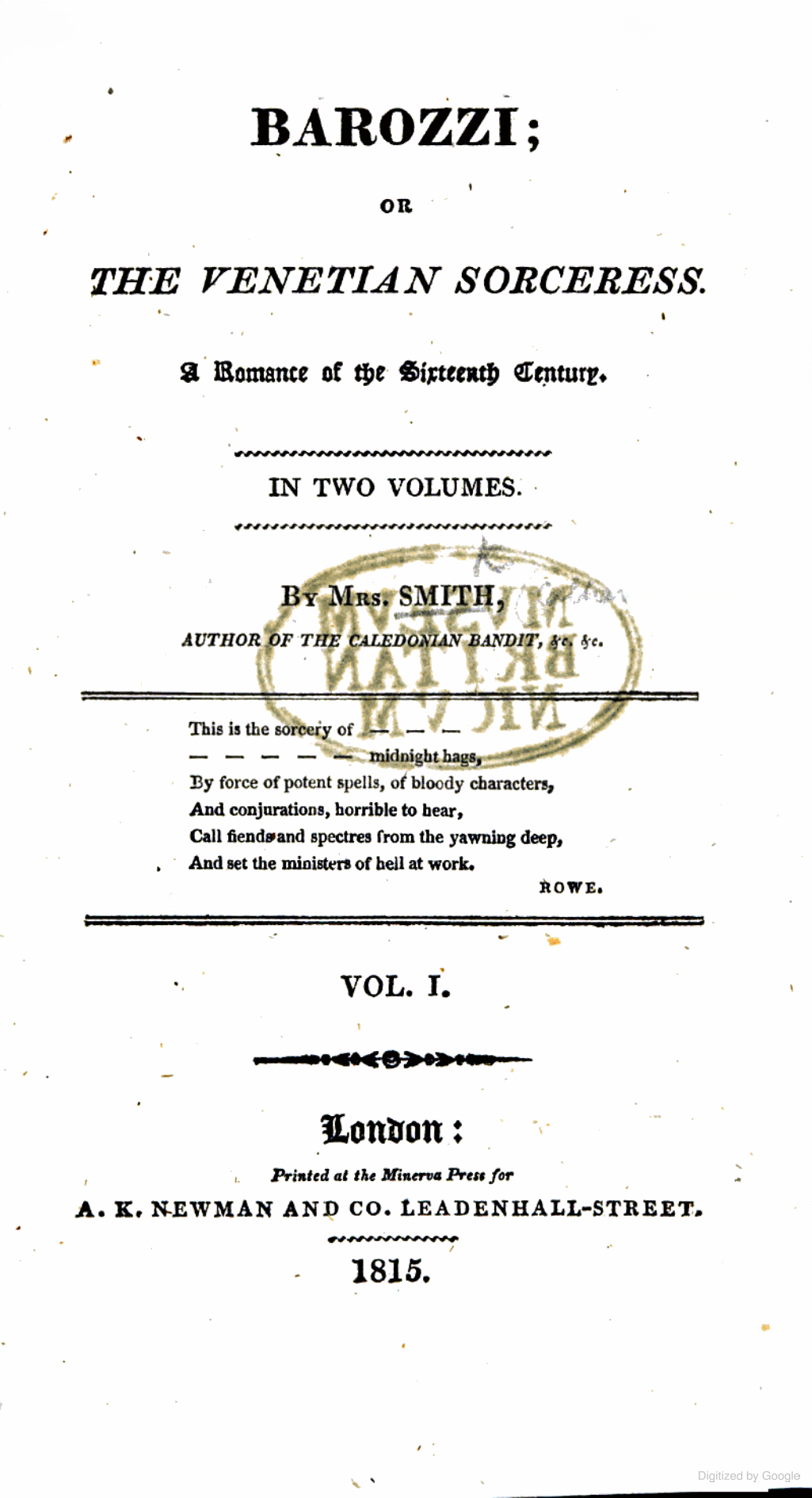
- Title page of first edition
- Author: Catherine Smith
- Language: English
- Genre: Gothic fiction
- Publisher: Minerva Press
- Publication date: 25 June 1815
- Publication place: United Kingdom
- Media type: Print

Barozzi; or, The Venetian Sorceress is a Gothic novel by English author and actress Catherine Smith, first published in 1815 by Minerva Press. Barozzi is the fourth and final novel published by Smith, and is, according to Devendra Varma "her finest achievement." The novel was reprinted by Arno Press in 1977 for their Gothic novels series, which reprinted rare or out of print Gothic texts between 1972 and 1977. Valancourt Books published the most recent edition of the novel in 2006.

== Plot ==
Rosalina St. Almo is kidnapped from her father by banditti, who also kill him in front of her. She is rescued by Rosalva di Barozzi, who takes her to Venice where his father lives. In Venice she encounters a sorceress at a masked ball who predicts her apparent doom.

== Editions ==
- 1977, New York: Arno Press
- 2006, Valancourt Books ISBN 978-0-97660-487-7
