= The Adventures of a Donkey =

1815 British children's book

The Adventures of a Donkey is a British children's circulation novel written in 1815 by Arabella Argus, author of other children's novel such as Ostentation and Liberality, The Juvenile Spectator and The Further Adventures of Jemmy Donkey. The story follows young Jemmy donkey's life. It is narrated by Jemmy himself, thus, is full of self-evaluation and growth; it also shows an interesting insight into the life of a nineteenth century working animal.

== Plot summary ==
A young donkey named Jemmy is brought up on a farm with his mother, father and his mentor named Balaam. When Jemmy reaches eighteen months, Farmer Howel sells him to the Fenton family under the care of Master Frederick. One day Master Frederic startles Jemmy causing him to buck and accidentally kick a chicken. Master Frederick threatens to beat him. Master Frederick's cousins, Charles and Marianne Fairfax see this and inform Master Fenton who orders Jemmy be sold to stop Master Frederick's cruelty. Jemmy is sold to Dr Manton.

Dr Manton, his son, George Manton, and his son's love, Caroline Morden, are a kind family who treat Jemmy well. Whilst staying with the Manton family, Jemmy meets Jenkins; the stable hand for the Manton family. Jenkins very rarely tends to Jemmy, but, when he does he is cruel. Caroline is ill, and as the weeks go by her condition worsens leaving Jemmy unemployed. There is to be a trip to Bristol, Jemmy learns, and Caroline, George and Dr Manton leave quickly. Two weeks later they return and Jemmy learns that Caroline is dead.

Irritable one day, Jemmy takes a walk down a lane adjacent to the house but strays too far and is taken by a vagrant named Dan. One night whilst eating dinner, Jemmy overhears a woman telling Dan that someone is looking for a lost donkey in Tunbridge. Dan decides to take Jemmy to Tunbridge the next day to see if anyone recognises him. The pair walked round Tunbridge before coming to an inn. A voice from the inn window bellowed to them; it as Jenkins. He informed Dan that this was his master's donkey which had gone missing some weeks ago. Dan passes Jemmy to Jenkins and leaves. Jenkins ties Jemmy up outside of the inn and re-enters to finish his drink and card game. During the game Jenkins bets Jemmy; he loses. Jemmy is transferred to the care of Mr Staples.

Jemmy's new home is an old shed he shares with Balaam and another donkey named Juba. Jemmy and Balaam reminisce and Jemmy tells Balaam of his travels since he left Mr Howel's farm. Later, Jemmy is sent out to work where he and other donkeys give rides to children on a hill side. His first passenger is a young lady named Lady Harriet; they ride to Lady Harriet's home where her mother and father see how fond she is of Jemmy and decide to buy him. Jemmy is thrilled by the news of a new loving family but saddened to be leaving Balaam. Jemmy's new owners, the Hampton family, have two children, Lady Harriet and Master Hubert.

After one month, Jemmy is taken back to work for Mr Staples where he resumes his usual duties. After some time Jemmy is sent to accompany Tom, Staples' sick son, to Bromley to stay with his cousin. Staples told his cousin to find a buyer for Jemmy whilst there, he complies and sells Jemmy to a sandman. During his time working for the sandman Jemmy becomes malnourished and weak and is sent to Blackheath to regain his strength where he is bought by the Turner family.

Jemmy enjoys a happy few months living with the Turner family, but, towards Christmas Mr Turner decides to gift an old friend, Mrs Arnot, with Jemmy because her horse has died. Shortly before Christmas, Jemmy is taken to London to meet his new owner. After a few months of working happily for Mrs Arnot, she succumbs to disease and everything she owns is bequeathed to her nephew, Jenkins, the former stable hand for the Manton family. He quickly sells everything, including Jemmy, and flees. Jemmy was sold to a Mr Carter and whilst under his care Jemmy falls and breaks his knees. After the accident Mr Carter has no further use for Jemmy and sells him to a Laundress from Kensington named Mrs Dawes.

During the care of Mrs Dawes Jemmy see Jenkins break into the yard and try to steal some linen, he is apprehended and transported overseas. After this incident Jemmy meets another donkey named Bobby who knows Balaam. He tells Jemmy that Balaam is ill and Jemmy contemplates escaping to be with him. Jemmy is sent to work for Mr Ford at a fair near Hampstead, close to where Balaam resides; he decides to escape the fair after nightfall to be with Balaam.

Come night fall Jemmy flees the fair and arrives at Balaam's residence a little before morning. Jemmy and Balaam reunite and talk for a long time. A gentleman walks past and Jemmy recognises him to be George Manton. Jemmy runs towards him; George is unsure at first if this is Jemmy but soon rescinds his doubts and is delighted to see him.

George informs Mr Ford that he wishes to keep Jemmy and they come to an agreement. Jemmy is very pleased with his situation; placed in the field next to Balaam and able to entertain children, George's cousins, frequently. One night, Jemmy takes a wander and comes across some vine fruits; he begins eating them at once. George's neighbour's servant, thinking there is an intruder, fires shots and one catches Jemmy's tail. He flees and takes shelter in a nearby barn, but, whilst attempting to escape the barn a large beam falls upon his back and Jemmy sustains a terrible injury. Upon learning of his injury, George transfers the care of Jemmy over to his cousin Charles.

Whilst recovering, Jemmy decides to write his memoirs but requires approval from Balaam. Balaam suggests they gather all of the greatest donkeys they know and run it by them. Balaam, Juba and eight of their closest friends gather, hear Jemmy's proposal and after some deliberations, approve. After the meeting Jemmy does not see Balaam for a few days and enquires after him to Juba. Juba explains to Jemmy that Balaam had died the morning after the meeting. Grief-stricken, Jemmy decides to dedicate his memoirs to his friend and mentor, Balaam.

== Character list ==
- Jemmy - Protagonist
- Mamma - Jemmy's mother
- Papa - Jemmy's father
- Balaam - friend of Jemmy's and his family; also his mentor
- Farmer Howel - owner of the farm where Jemmy is born; Jemmy's first owner
- Master Fenton - Jemmy's second owner
- Mrs Fenton - Master Fenton's wife
- Master Frederick - son of Master and Mrs Fenton
- Charles Fairfax - Master and Mrs Fenton's nephew
- Marianne Fairfax - sister of Charles Fairfax; niece of Master and Mrs Fenton
- Dr Manton - Jemmy's third owner
- George Manton - Dr Manton's son; Jemmy's twelfth owner
- Caroline Morden - George Manton's love
- Jenkins - Dr Manton's stable hand; Mrs Arnot's nephew
- Dan - Vagrant; Jemmy's fourth owner
- Mr Staples - Jemmy's fifth owner
- Juba - Donkey who shares Mr Staples' shed with Jemmy and Balaam
- Earl of Hampton - Jemmy's sixth owner
- Lady Hampton - Earl of Hampton's wife
- Lady Harriet - Earl and Lady Hampton's daughter
- Master Hubert - Lady Harriet's brother
- Mr Maxwell - Bricklayer; hires Jemmy from Mrs Staples for two months
- Thomas - Mr Staples' son
- Cousin Smith - Mr Staples cousin
- The Sandman - Jemmy's seventh owner
- Mrs Ellis - Laundress who cares for Jemmy
- Mr Turner - Jemmy's eighth owner
- Maria Turner - Mr Turner's eldest daughter
- Emma Turner - Mr Turner's second eldest daughter
- Charlotte Turner - Mr Turner's youngest daughter
- Mrs Arnot - Family friend of the Turner family; Jemmy's ninth owner
- Mrs Corsan - Mrs Arnot's neighbour
- Mr Carter - Jemmy's tenth owner
- Jack Carter - Mr Carter's son
- Mrs Dawes - Laundress; Jemmy's eleventh owner
- Bobby - donkey; Jemmy' friend whilst at Mrs Dawes'
- Mr Ford - Jemmy's temporary owner
- Charlotte Herbert - George Manton's cousin
- Charles Herbert - Charlotte Herbert's son; Jemmy's thirteenth owner
- Mr Crosby - George Manton's neighbour

== Critical reception ==
The Adventures of a Donkey, much like Argus' other works, did not receive scholarly attention and only received recognition in contemporary reviews. According to the 1924 edition of the Saturday Review of Politics, Literature, Science and Art, this was due to Argus not being as 'widely read compared with very many of her contemporaries.'

The general consensus was that it was a brilliant attempt at opening the eyes of children to the maltreatment of the donkey, which was appropriate as the donkey had risen in fashion during the early 1800s. The Lady's Monthly Museum described it as, "[a] vehicle for conveying sound morals and instruction to the youthful mind, under the guise of innocent pleasantry." And The Monthly Review of 1752-1825 said it was an 'agreeable little book' which creates and interest for the promotion of humanity. The 1806-1819 edition of The Literary Panorama thought it should be regarded favourably due to Argus' contribution to donkey welfare by introducing children to the mishaps which can occur from maltreatment, stating, "...[Argus'] imagination has exercised itself in favour of the rising generation." And, "it is an act of benevolence to call youthful attention to their [donkeys] necessities, and to contribute in a proper degree to their comforts by good usage."

Other publications, such as the 1833 edition of The Gentleman's Magazine: and Historical Chronicle said it was 'amusing and agreeable'.

The only form of criticism is concerning Argus herself, a book review in the ninth volume of The Literary Panorama 1806-1819 stated, "We have repeatedly stated our opinion on the difficulty of writing books for children. Of that difficulty Mrs Argus has not been sufficiently sensible." They go on to say that she cannot properly distinguish the difference between "what is childlike and what is childish." The Critical Review, Or, The Annals of Literature 1816 also stated that The Adventures of a Donkey lacks ability.

The majority of criticism on this novel is found in nineteenth century newspapers, magazines and periodicals under an advertisement or small review; none can be found in scholarly articles or essays.
