= List of Darkover books =

The following books are set in the fictional world of Darkover and were written, co-authored, edited or started by Marion Zimmer Bradley.

Pub. Year	Title	Reprint(s)	Co-author	Darkovan era	Notes
1958	The Planet Savers	1962, 1995, 2004 as part of To Save a World omnibus		Against the Terrans; The Second Age; After the Comyn	
1962	The Sword of Aldones	see Sharra's Exile		Against the Terrans: The Second Age; After the Comyn	Re-written in 1981 and incorporated into Sharra's Exile
1964	The Bloody Sun	Rewritten in 1979, 2003 as part of A World Divided omnibus		Against the Terrans: The Second Age; After the Comyn	Book #3 of Spell Sword/Forbidden Tower/Bloody Sun series
1965	Star of Danger	1994, 2003 as part of A World Divided omnibus		Against the Terrans: The First Age; Recontact	
1970	The Winds of Darkover	1995, 2003 as part of A World Divided omnibus		Against the Terrans: The First Age; Recontact	
1971	The World Wreckers	1994, 2004 as part of To Save a World omnibus		Against the Terrans: The Second Age; After the Comyn	
1972	Darkover Landfall	2004 as part of Darkover: First Contact omnibus		The Founding	
1974	The Spell Sword	2002 as part of The Forbidden Circle omnibus	Paul Edwin Zimmer (uncredited)	Against the Terrans: The First Age; Recontact	Book #1 of Spell Sword/Forbidden Tower/Bloody Sun series
1975	The Heritage of Hastur	2002 as part of Heritage and Exile omnibus		Against the Terrans: The Second Age; After the Comyn	Book #1 of Heritage of Hastur/Sharra's Exile/Reluctant King series
1976	The Shattered Chain	2002 as part of Saga of the Renunciates omnibus		The Renunciates	Book #1 of Shattered Chain/Thendara House/City of Sorcery series
1977	The Forbidden Tower	2002 as part of The Forbidden Circle omnibus		Against the Terrans: The First Age; Recontact	Book #2 of Spell Sword/Forbidden Tower/Bloody Sun series
1978	Stormqueen!	2002 as part of Ages of Chaos omnibus		The Ages of Chaos	
1979	The Bloody Sun (rewrite)	1994		Against the Terrans: The Second Age; After the Comyn	Book #3 of Spell Sword/Forbidden Tower/Bloody Sun series
1980	Two to Conquer	2004 as part of Darkover: First Contact omnibus		The Hundred Kingdoms	
1980	The Keeper's Price		Various	Various	Anthology of short stories set in Darkover
1981	Sharra's Exile	2002 as part of Heritage and Exile omnibus		Against the Terrans: The Second Age; After the Comyn	Book #2 of Heritage of Hastur/Sharra's Exile/Reluctant King series
1982	Hawkmistress!	2002 as part of Ages of Chaos omnibus		The Ages of Chaos	
1982	Sword of Chaos		Various	Various	Anthology of short stories set in Darkover
1983	Thendara House	2002 as part of Saga of the Renunciates omnibus	Jacqueline Lichtenberg (uncredited)	The Renunciates	Book #2 of Shattered Chain/Thendara House/City of Sorcery series
1984	City of Sorcery	2002 as part of Saga of the Renunciates omnibus		The Renunciates	Book #3 of Shattered Chain/Thendara House/City of Sorcery series
1985	Free Amazons of Darkover		Various	Various	Anthology of short stories set in Darkover
1987	The Other Side of the Mirror		Various	Various	Anthology of short stories set in Darkover
1987	Red Sun of Darkover		Various	Various	Anthology of short stories set in Darkover
1988	Four Moons of Darkover		Various	Various	Anthology of short stories set in Darkover
1989	The Heirs of Hammerfell			The Hundred Kingdoms	
1990	Domains of Darkover		Various	Various	Anthology of short stories set in Darkover
1991	Renunciates of Darkover		Various	Various	Anthology of short stories set in Darkover
1991	Leroni of Darkover		Various	Various	Anthology of short stories set in Darkover
1993	Rediscovery		Mercedes Lackey	Against the Terrans: The First Age; Recontact	
1993	Towers of Darkover		Various	Various	Anthology of short stories set in Darkover
1993	Marion Zimmer Bradley's Darkover			Various	Collection of short stories set in Darkover, includes To Keep the Oath
1994	Snows of Darkover		Various	Various	Anthology of short stories set in Darkover
1996	Exile's Song		Adrienne Martine-Barnes	Against the Terrans: The Second Age; After the Comyn	Sequel to Sharra's Exile
1998	The Shadow Matrix		Adrienne Martine-Barnes	Against the Terrans: The Second Age; After the Comyn	Sequel to Exile's Song
1999	Traitor's Sun		Adrienne Martine-Barnes	Against the Terrans: The Second Age; After the Comyn	Sequel to The Shadow Matrix
2001	The Fall of Neskaya		Deborah J. Ross	The Ages of Chaos	Clingfire Trilogy #1 - in progress at Marion Zimmer Bradley's death
2003	Zandru's Forge		Deborah J. Ross	The Ages of Chaos	Clingfire Trilogy #2 - in progress at Marion Zimmer Bradley's death
2004	A Flame in Hali		Deborah J. Ross	The Ages of Chaos	Clingfire Trilogy #3 - in progress at Marion Zimmer Bradley's death
2007	The Alton Gift		Deborah J. Ross	Against the Terrans: The Second Age; After the Comyn	Children of Kings Trilogy #1 - in progress at Marion Zimmer Bradley's death
2010	Hastur Lord		Deborah J. Ross	Against the Terrans: The Second Age; After the Comyn	Book #3 of Heritage of Hastur/Sharra's Exile/Reluctant King series, set ten years after The World Wreckers - in progress at Marion Zimmer Bradley's death
2013	The Children of Kings		Deborah J. Ross	Against the Terrans: The Second Age; After the Comyn	Children of Kings Trilogy #2 - in progress at Marion Zimmer Bradley's death
2016	Thunderlord!		Deborah J. Ross	The Ages of Chaos	In progress at Marion Zimmer Bradley's death; sequel to Stormqueen!
2022	The Laran Gambit		Deborah J. Ross	Against the Terrans: The Second Age; After the Comyn	Children of Kings Trilogy #3 - in progress at Marion Zimmer Bradley's death
2024	Arilinn		Deborah J. Ross	The Ages of Chaos	In progress at Marion Zimmer Bradley's death

== Related books ==
The early novels Falcons of Narabedla and The Door Through Space are listed by some sources as part of the Darkover series, but although they presage some themes and images with the main sequence, these do not take place on Darkover, and are in other ways inconsistent with the series. Clute and Nicholls (1995) described these novels as "marginally linked" to Darkover.

Pub. Year	Title	Reprint(s)	Darkovan era	Notes
1957	Falcons of Narabedla	1964, 1988, 1991	? (after Terran contact)	Listed by Tuck (1974), Ash (1976) and in certain other Darkover books as part of the series. Clute (1995) describes it as "marginally linked" to Darkover. It is not included in other listings of the series.
1961	The Door Through Space	1965	? (after Terran contact)	Expanded from "Bird of Prey" (1957). Listed by Tuck (1974), Ash (1976) and in certain other Darkover books as part of the series. Clute (1995) describes it as "marginally linked" to Darkover. It is not included in other listings of the series.
