= The Alton Gift =

2007 novel by Marion Zimmer Bradley and Deborah J. Ross

- Author: Marion Zimmer Bradley and Deborah J. Ross
- Cover artist: Romas Kukalis
- Language: English
- Series: Darkover
- Genre: Science fiction
- Publisher: DAW Books
- Publication date: June 2007
- Publication place: United States
- Media type: Print (hardcover)
- Pages: 466
- Preceded by: Traitor's Sun
- Followed by: The Children of Kings

The Alton Gift is a science fiction novel by American writers Marion Zimmer Bradley and Deborah J. Ross in the Darkover series. It was first published by in hardcover by DAW Books in 2007. The book is the first in the "Children of Kings" trilogy.

In terms of Darkover's timeline, the book starts three years after the death of Regis Hastur in Traitor's Sun, and is a continuation of that story. The book falls in the Darkover time period that the publisher has labeled "Modern Darkover", which succeeds the departure of the Terran Federation. The story continues quite directly in The Children of Kings.

== Plot summary ==
=== Book One ===
Domenic Alton-Hastur arrives at Comyn Castle in Thendara, accompanying the body of his late grandmother, Javanne Lanart-Hastur. He is reunited with his cousin, Alanna Alar, an emotionally unstable young woman who is unable to control her outbursts of temper and laran.

Domenic and Danilo Syrtis-Ardais learn that Alanna appears to have a version of the Elhalyn gift, which shows the possessor multiple possible futures. Alanna has no control over the gift, and the episodes of precognition come on her without warning. Danilo tells her she should go to Arilinn Tower for training, but she refuses. Domenic realizes that he is becoming increasingly attracted to Alanna, though he knows his family would object. They agree between themselves to a secret handfasting.

Lew Alton is suffering increasing depression and nightmares. He confides in Danilo Syrtis-Ardais that he cannot shake the weight of the events of his life, particularly his participation in the Sharra catastrophe (from The Heritage of Hastur and Sharra's Exile) and the battle on the Old North Road (from Traitor's Sun). Danilo recommends a retreat at the cristoforo monastery, St.-Valentine-of-the-Snows. Though he is skeptical, Lew agrees to go.

=== Book Two ===
Jeram, a man living in a small village, begins to suffer threshold sickness. His family takes him to Neskaya Tower, where the Keeper, Silvana, and her underkeeper, Illona, identify him as a Terran. As he recovers his memories, he realizes that he participated in the battle on the Old North Road. Now self-identifying as Darkovan, he decides he must seek forgiveness from the Comyn Council. Silvana arranges a meeting between Jeram and Lew Alton, which proves healing for both men. Lew observes that Silvana has the Hastur Gift (living matrix). He believes that she may be Kierestelli, the daughter of Regis Hastur entrusted for protection to the chieri in Hastur Lord.

Domenic arrives at Neskaya and reunites with Illona Rider. He realizes that he loves Illona far more than he does Alanna, despite his promise to the latter. He accompanies Lew, Jeram, and Illona back to Thendara. Illona tells Domenic that she accepts the nature of their relationship and realizes they can never marry.

They encounter a man who appears to be suffering from trailmen's fever (from The Planet Savers), which all had believed to have been wiped out over 40 years prior.

At Thendara, Jeram takes shelter in a transient camp. He meets Liam, an associate of Francisco Ridenow, who tells him that the Comyn Council will not agree to hear him. Liam turns out to be right. He takes Jeram to Francisco Ridenow, who appears sympathetic at first, but drugs Jeram and takes him prisoner. Under questioning, Jeram reveals that Lew and Marguerida used their Alton Gift on the Terran forces during the battles of Comyn Castle and Old North Road, in violation of Comyn custom.

=== Book Three ===
Domenic, Lew, and Illona arrive at Comyn Castle in Thendara. Lew suffers a heart attack but survives. He asks Domenic to find Jeram, saying that he believes Jeram is in terrible danger.

At the opening of Comyn Council season, Danilo Syrtis-Ardais proposes that nedestro offspring of the Comyn be seated in the Council if they have laran. Accordingly, Kennard-Dyan Ardais legitimates three of his nedestro children, including Illona Rider.

Alanna discovers Domenic in conversation with Illona, and realizes they are in love. She runs, and stumbles into a back passageway that leads to Lew Alton's bedroom. Alanna tells Lew her fears, and has the first honest exchange she has ever had with another human being. Again, as with Jeram, the experience is healing for both of them.

The following day, Danilo Syrtis-Ardais surprises the council with another revelation – a candidate to fill the vacant Aillard seat, Darius-Mikhail Zabal.

Francisco Ridenow brings a drugged and beaten Jeram into the Council chamber and demands that he recite Ridenow's version of the battles of Comyn Castle and Old North Road. Despite his condition, Jeram resists. Marilla Lindir-Aillard collapses and confusion ensues.

Undeterred, Ridenow accuses Mikhail Lanart-Hastur of holding power unlawfully. He challenges Mikhail to trial by single combat, and reluctantly, Mikhail agrees. Mikhail kills Ridenow, but not before he is wounded with a poisoned blade. The Keepers attending Council join to save Mikhail's life, but they are able only to slow the inevitable.

Illona informs Marguerida that Marilla Lindir-Aillard's collapse was not caused by a heart attack, but by trailmen's fever. Marguerida takes a party to the abandoned Terran spaceport, to search out records of the vaccine created nearly 50 years earlier to treat a similar epidemic. With Jeram's assistance, they are able to retrieve the records.

=== Book Four ===
In the transient camp, Jeram's friend Ulm recovers from the fever. Jeram persuades him to donate blood to assist in finding a cure.

The Keepers join to use laran to synthesize a cure, but the process is too slow. Marguerida uses her shadow matrix to make a sufficient quantity, but the effort traps her in the Overworld. Domenic joins his parents' hands, once again joining the ring of Varzil the Good that his father wears with his mother's shadow matrix. Marguerida uses their joint power to heal her husband's wound.

With the epidemic receding, Comyn Council gathers again. Domenic announces his engagement to Alanna, but she declines, saying she needs training at a Tower to master her laran gifts. This leaves Domenic free to marry Illona. The Keeper's Council charges Marguerida with the misuse of her laran at the battle of the Old North Road, while acknowledging that she saved most of their lives by doing so. They require her to finish her Tower training, which had been interrupted by the events described in The Shadow Matrix. The Council brings no charges against Lew, saying he is free to return to the St.-Valentine-of-the-Snows monastery.

Jeram returns to his family and moves to Thendara to help prepare for the eventual return of the Federation.

== Major characters ==
- Mikhail Lanart-Hastur, Regent of Darkover.
- Marguerida Alton-Hastur, Mikhail's wife.
- Domenic Alton-Hastur (aka Nico), Mikhail and Marguerida's son.
- Lew Alton, Marguerida's father.
- Danilo Syrtis-Ardais, paxman to the late Regis Hastur.
- Francisco Ridenow, a disgruntled Comyn nobleman.
- Jeram (aka Jeremiah Reed), a former Terran Special Forces member, living on Darkover under an assumed identity.
- Illona Rider (later Illona Ardais), underkeeper of Neskaya Tower.
- Alanna Alar, Domenic's cousin.

== Publication history ==
- Jun 2007, DAW Books (DAW Collectors #1403), 978-0-7564-0019-4, 466pp, hardcover
- Jul 2007, DAW Books/SFBC, #1238318, 466pp, hardcover
- Jun 2008, DAW Books (DAW Collectors #1403), 978-0-7564-0480-2, 528pp, paperback
