= Exile's Song =

1996 novel by Marion Zimmer Bradley and Adrienne Martine-Barnes

- First edition
- Author: Marion Zimmer Bradley and Adrienne Martine-Barnes
- Cover artist: Romas Kukalis
- Language: English
- Series: Darkover
- Genre: Science fantasy
- Publisher: DAW Books
- Publication date: 1996
- Publication place: United States
- Media type: Print (hardcover)
- Pages: 435
- ISBN: 0886773954
- Preceded by: Hastur Lord
- Followed by: The Shadow Matrix

Exile's Song is a science fantasy novel by American writers Marion Zimmer Bradley and Adrienne Martine-Barnes, part of the Darkover series. It was first published in hardcover by DAW Books in 1996. The book takes place during the era of Darkover's history known as the second age post-Comyn and after the coming of the Terrans.

The book is part of a trilogy within the series comprising Exile's Song, The Shadow Matrix and Traitor's Sun. It takes place fifteen years before Traitor's Sun and some twenty years after Sharra's Exile.

Exile's Song represents a dramatic alteration of Bradley's view of the masculine/feminine, technological/ecological, Terran/Darkover dichotomies that she has explored throughout the Darkover series. In her earliest Darkover writing (1960s), she portrayed the planet's semi-feudal culture as played-out and in need of saving by the technologically superior Terrans. In the middle period (1970s-1980s), the books display a growing ambivalence to both views. In Exile's Song, Bradley reverses direction exclusively in favor of the feminine/ecological/Darkover view, describing the Terran Federation as played-out. This makes Exile's Song a pivotal book in the development of the series.

== Plot summary ==
Marguerida Alton, a music scholar, accompanies her friend and employer, Professor Ivor Davidson, to Darkover where the two intend to study local folk music. She hires two children to guide them to Music Street in Thendara. Her conversation with the children ignites long-forgotten memories of the five years she lived on Darkover as a child.

Several days after their arrival, Ivor dies in his sleep and is buried on Darkover. After the funeral, Marguerida is approached by Captain Rafe Scott, who tries to explain how they are related, but discovers that she knows nothing of her own family history.

At Rafe's suggestion, Marguerida hires Rafaella n'ha Liriel, a Renunciate guide, to assist her in her folk music gathering project. They successfully gather many songs, but Marguerida's dreams begin to be troubled by long-repressed memories of her childhood on Darkover.

Marguerida becomes ill and the pair take shelter at the Ardais estate. When the illness appears to be Threshold Sickness lasting several weeks, her host, Lady Marilla Aillard, sends for Istvana Ridenow, keeper of Neskaya Tower.

Istvana becomes aware of a presence in Marguerida's mind that occasionally controls her. With Istvana and Marilla's assistance, Marguerida confronts the presence, which turns out to be the will of a long-dead Keeper, Ashara Alton. Marguerida recognizes a keystone, a visual representation of Ashara's hold on her, and takes hold of it. She is able to dislodge the keystone with the unexpected assistance of Mikhail Lanart-Hastur, another house guest whom she barely knows. The experience leaves a "shadow matrix" in her right hand – the blue glowing outlines of the keystone that function as a matrix. Having broken the "tower of mirrors", Marguerida begins to recover.

Gabriel Lanart-Alton, Marguerida's uncle and Warden of Alton, arrives at Ardais. He demands that she decamp to the Alton estate, Armida, and finds himself on the losing end of a very loud fight. In the end, Marguerida hears her father's voice telling her that it will be alright if she goes to Armida.

Before she leaves for Armida, Marguerida has an unexpected conversation with Mikhail. He tells her that his parents want to marry her off to one of his brothers and asks her to promise that she won't allow this. She assures him that she won't allow herself to be married against her will, though both of Mikhail's brothers do eventually propose. She turns down both of them.

At Armida, she finds her aunt and uncle, Javanne and Gabriel Lanart-Hastur, to be conservative, and they are shocked by her unconventional life and opinions. More to her liking are her uncle, Jeff Kerwin (from The Bloody Sun), and cousin, Liriel, a matrix technician from Arilinn Tower. Liriel's twin, Ariel, is so unnerved by Marguerida that she and her family abruptly leave Armida, inadvertently causing a carriage accident that leaves one of her sons mortally injured. Ariel blames Marguerida.

In the midst of the commotion, Lew Alton, Marguerida's father, arrives at Armida. He informs his relations that Dio, his wife, is ill and has remained behind in Thendara. He also explains that he has resigned as Darkover's representative to the Terran Federation Senate, and has been replaced by Herm Aldaran. Another loud argument with Javanne ensues.

During the night, Donal Alar, a young boy, attempts to frighten Marguerida as a prank. She unintentionally uses Command Voice—a trait of the Alton telepathic gift—on him and send his spirit into the Overworld. With the support of her relatives Marguerida returns to the Tower of Mirrors in the Overworld, greets her dead mentor Ivor and successfully returns young Donal to his body.

Marguerida, Lew, Mikhail, Jeff, and others undertake the journey back to Thendara so that Marguerida can see her dying step-mother, Diotima. In telepathic discussions with Mikhail, Marguerida admits that she needs to remain on Darkover and gain control of her new laran abilities. Mikhail explains the unspoken objection everyone has to their relationship – that a marriage between Mikhail and Marguerida would concentrate too much power, both political and laran, in a single couple.

During the trip, she points to the ruin of Hali Tower and asks what it is. It becomes clear that she sees the tower as it originally stood, while everyone else sees the ruins, foreshadowing events in The Shadow Matrix.

The traveling party arrives at Comyn Castle. Marguerida discovers that her months of experiences on Darkover have left her more comfortable in the castle than she was the first time.

Regis calls a meeting in the Crystal Chamber of whats left of the Comyn. He explains that the Telepathic Council (from The World Wreckers) has not provided sufficient leadership for Darkover. He further explains that the Elhalyn line has essentially gone extinct, leaving no one to inherit the Elhalyn kingship. These two problems leave Darkover vulnerable to Terran predation. Regis determines to reconstituting the Comyn Council to replace the Telepathic Council. He appoints Mikhail Lanart-Hastur as Regent of Elhalyn.

Marguerida admits to her father that the only man on Darkover she would willingly marry is the one forbidden to her. She and Mikhail quietly agree to make the marriage happen.

== Characters ==
- Marguerida Alton (aka Margaret or Marja), daughter of Lew Alton and Thyra Darriell.
- Lew Alton, her father.
- Regis Hastur, the Regent of Darkover.
- Mikhail Lanart-Hastur, Regis Hastur's heir.
- Rafe Scott, Marguerida's uncle, her mother's half-Terran/half-Darkovan brother.
- Rafaella n'ha Liriel, a Renunciate guide.
- Ashara Alton, the long-dead keeper of Comyn Tower.
- Istvana Ridenow, keeper of Neskaya Tower.
- Jeff Kerwin (aka Damon Ridenow), Marguerida's uncle.

== Publication history ==
- Jun 1996, DAW Books, 0-88677-705-4, $21.95, 435pp, hc
- Sep 1996, DAW Books / SFBC, #13727, $8.98, 435pp, hc
- La chanson de l'exil, Oct 1996, Presses Pocket Science Fiction #5604, 2-266-06602-1, 414pp, pb
- Apr 1997, DAW Books, 0-88677-734-8, $6.99, 493pp, pb
