= Vera Nazarian =

American novelist

Vera Nazarian (born 1966 in Moscow, Soviet Union) is an Armenian-Russian (by ethnicity) American writer of fantasy, science fiction and other "wonder fiction" including mythpunk, an artist, and the publisher of Norilana Books. She is a member of the Science Fiction and Fantasy Writers of America (SFWA) and the author of fourteen novels, including Dreams of the Compass Rose, a "collage" novel structured as a series of related and interlinked stories similar in arabesque flavor to The One Thousand and One Nights, Lords of Rainbow, a standalone epic fantasy about a world without color, the Cobweb Bride trilogy, and The Atlantis Grail books.

== Crowdfunding controversy ==
In 2014 controversy erupted when she started an Indiegogo campaign to raise money for her authors; although the campaign was canceled after three days. As a result of "personal misfortunes", she had stopped paying royalties to the authors publishing books with Norilana Books, and hoped to raise enough money to pay what she owed them through the crowdfunding campaign. This generated discussion and criticism questioning to which extent small businesses should use Indiegogo or other similar crowdfunding sites to pay off business debt, and also resulted in criticism against her handling of the matter. A similar fundraiser was carried out successfully in 2008 for the same reasons, which resulted in donations of $19,000 to cover the debt she owed her authors, as well as to support herself.

== Selected works ==
=== Novels ===
- Dreams of the Compass Rose ("collage" novel), Wildside Press, May 2002. Nebula Award Preliminary Ballot 2002 nominee.
- Lords of Rainbow, or, The Book of Fulfillment, Betancourt & Company, an imprint of Wildside Press, March 2003.
- Mansfield Park and Mummies: Monster Mayhem, Matrimony, Ancient Curses, True Love, and Other Dire Delights , "Curiosities", an imprint of Norilana Books, November 2009.
- Northanger Abbey and Angels and Dragons , "Curiosities", an imprint of Norilana Books, December 2010.
- Pride and Platypus: Mr. Darcy's Dreadful Secret , "Curiosities", an imprint of Norilana Books, June 2012.
- Cobweb Bride (Cobweb Bride Trilogy, Book One), "Leda", an imprint of Norilana Books, July 15, 2013.
- Cobweb Empire (Cobweb Bride Trilogy, Book Two), "Leda", an imprint of Norilana Books, September 25, 2013.
- Cobweb Forest (Cobweb Bride Trilogy, Book Three), "Leda", an imprint of Norilana Books, December 31, 2013.
- Qualify (The Atlantis Grail, Book One), Norilana Books, December 20, 2014.
- Compete (The Atlantis Grail, Book Two), Norilana Books, August 15, 2015.
- Win (The Atlantis Grail, Book Three), Norilana Books, July 12, 2017. Dragon Awards 2018 Finalist.
- Survive (The Atlantis Grail, Book Four), Norilana Books, January 3, 2020.
- Eos (Dawn of the Atlantis Grail, Book One), Norilana Books, August 5, 2025.

=== Novellas ===
- The Clock King and the Queen of the Hourglass, PS Publishing, UK, October 2005, with an introduction by Charles de Lint, on the Locus Recommended Reading List 2005.
- The Duke in His Castle, Norilana Books, June 2008. Nebula Award 2008 Finalist.

=== Collections ===
- Salt of the Air, Prime Books, September 2006, with an introduction by Gene Wolfe. Debut collection of author's fantasy short fiction, spanning 20 years of her career, including works from 1985 to 2005. Expanded and reissued definitive edition, Norilana Books, April 2009.
- After the Sundial, Norilana Books, August 2010.

=== Miscellaneous in book form ===
- Hell Week at Grant-Williams High (two-novella omnibus), "YA Angst" an imprint of Norilana Books, January 19, 2011.
- The Perpetual Calendar of Inspiration , "Spirit", an imprint of Norilana Books, October 2010.
- Vampires are from Venus, Werewolves are from Mars: A Comprehensive Guide to Attracting Supernatural Love, "Curiosities", an imprint of Norilana Books, December 2012.

=== Short stories ===
- "Streets Running Like a River," Night's Nieces: The Legacy of Tanith Lee, edited by Storm Constantine, December 11, 2015.
- "Zandru's Gift," Stars of Darkover, edited by Deborah J. Ross and Elisabeth Waters, June 3, 2014.
- "Danila's Song," Music of Darkover, edited by Elisabeth Waters, June 3, 2013 (reprint).
- "Niola's Last Stand," Black Gate Magazine, edited by John O'Neill, May 12, 2013.
- "The Witch Who Made Adjustments," Past Future Present 2011 by Helen E Davis, December 10, 2011.
- "The Slaying of Winter," a reprint in four parts, Polu Texni, October 2008, edited by Dawn Albright.
- "Three Names of the Hidden God," Heroes in Training, edited by Martin H. Greenberg and Jim C. Hines, DAW Books, September 2007
- "The Ballad of Universal Jack," New Writings in the Fantastic, edited by John Grant, Pendragon Press, September 2007.
- "The Story of Love," Best New Romantic Fantasy #2, edited by Paula Guran, Juno Books, June 2007. Nebula Award 2007 Finalist.
- "Port Custodial Blues," Helix SF #2, October 2006, edited by William Sanders and Lawrence Watt-Evans. The short story was a WSFA Small Press Award 2007 Finalist.
- "I Want To Paint The Sky," Bli Panika, reprint translated into Hebrew, December 2005.
- "Halloween at Grant-Williams High," Fictionwise, original novelette, July 2003.
- "The Young Woman in a House of Old," Strange Pleasures #2, Prime Books, June 2003, edited by John Grant and Dave Hutchinson.
- "Lady of the Castle," Bookface.com, July 2000.
- "Mount Dragon," Talebones, Issue #14, January 1999.
- "A Dance for Darkover," Leroni of Darkover, DAW Books 1991 (co-written with Diana Perry).
- "The Balance," Marion Zimmer Bradley's Fantasy Magazine, Issue 9, Summer 1990.
- "The Jackal," Four Moons of Darkover, cover story, DAW Books 1988.
- "Kihar," Red Sun of Darkover, DAW Books 1987.
- Several entries in the Sword and Sorceress series, DAW Books 1985.
- "Danila's Song" in Music of Darkover, 2013

== Non-fiction articles ==
- "Home Improvement in Magic Land," pop culture essay appearing in the BenBella Books SmartPop Series anthology Totally Charmed: Demons, Whitelighters and the Power of Three based on the TV show Charmed, edited by Jennifer Crusie, November 2005.
- "Publicity and Self-Promotion Nouveau: Doing It With Class," article on publicity and self-promotion for writers, appearing in Speculations Issue Forty-Six, edited by Susan Fry, April 2002.
