= Norilana Books =

Independent book publisher

- Founded: 2006
- Founder: Vera Nazarian
- Country of origin: United States
- Headquarters location: Los Angeles, California
- Distribution: Ingram (US); Bertrams (UK)
- Publication types: Books
- Imprints: YA Angst, Leda, Spirit, The Sword of Norilana
- Official website: www.norilana.com

Norilana Books is an independent publishing company, founded in August 2006 and based in the United States. It is operated and owned by Vera Nazarian. Norilana publishes reprints of previously published Science Fiction and Fantasy works, including the novels of Modean Moon. More recently, Norilana has been publishing several series of original anthologies, including Clockwork Phoenix, edited by Mike Allen, Warrior Wisewoman, edited by Roby James, and Lace and Blade edited by Deborah J. Ross. The company was selected to continue the publication of Marion Zimmer Bradley's Sword and Sorceress series of short story anthologies, edited by Elisabeth Waters. Norilana Books also publishes classics of world literature under the Norilana Books Classics imprint and works of genre fiction including young adult fantasy under the YA Angst imprint. Other imprints include: Curiosities, Leda, and TaLeKa, which is dedicated to author Tanith Lee.

== Books published by Norilana ==
- Mike Allen, Clockwork Phoenix, 2008
- Mike Allen, Clockwork Phoenix 2, 2009. Stories from Clockwork Phoenix 2 were nominated for the Nebula Award and the WSFA Small Press Award.
- Eugie Foster, Returning My Sister's Face, 2009
- John Grant, Leaving Fortusa, 2008
- Roby James, Warrior Wisewoman, 2008
- Roby James, Warrior Wisewoman 2, 2009
- Roby James, Warrior Wisewoman 3, 2010
- Tanith Lee, Sounds and Furies, 2010
- William Sanders, East of the Sun & West of Fort Smith, 2008
- Sherwood Smith, A Posse of Princesses, 2008
- Sherwood Smith, A Stranger to Command, 2008
- Catherynne M. Valente, Guide to Folktales in Fragile Dialects, 2008
- Elisabeth Waters, Marion Zimmer Bradley's Sword & Sorceress XXII, 2007
- Elisabeth Waters, Marion Zimmer Bradley's Sword & Sorceress XXIII, 2008
- Elisabeth Waters, Marion Zimmer Bradley's Sword & Sorceress XXIV, 2009
