= The Sword of Aldones =

1962 novel by Marion Zimmer Bradley

- Cover of the first edition
- Author: Marion Zimmer Bradley
- Language: English
- Series: Darkover
- Genre: Sword and planet
- Publisher: Ace Books
- Publication date: 1962
- Publication place: United States
- Media type: Print (paperback)
- Pages: 164
- OCLC: 17399915
- Preceded by: The Heritage of Hastur
- Followed by: Hastur Lord

The Sword of Aldones is a sword and planet novel by American writer Marion Zimmer Bradley, part of her Darkover series. It was first published by Ace Books in 1962, dos-à-dos with her other novel The Planet Savers. Bradley revised and rewrote the novel publishing it as Sharra's Exile in 1981.

In his 1977 review of the re-release of The Sword of Aldones, Lester del Rey wrote that "it presents a somewhat different Darkover than we find in later novels. But even the early stories have the wonderful allure of this strange world".

== Plot summary ==
Lew Alton returns to Darkover after a long absence. He muses about the Sharra Rebellion, which events six years earlier, led to his wife's death. In the spaceport, he meets a woman he mistakes for Linnell Aillard, her near duplicate, but she does not recognize him.

Lew arrives at the Comyn Council, with deliberations already in progress. The council is considering accepting the Domain of Aldaran in the Comyn Council, an unpopular move since Aldaran was the seat of the Sharra Rebellion. The council is deeply divided, and Lew sides with the anti-Aldaran faction. Lew reveals that the Sharra Matrix is still active, embedded in the hilt of a sword.

During a riding party, several council members discuss the Sharra Matrix. The riding party is attacked by Robert Kadarin. Lew's brother, Marius, is killed, and the Sharra Matrix stolen. There are strong hints that Dyan Ardais is behind this attack and a series of attacks that follow.

Lew and Callina Aillard meet with the fantastically old keeper, Ashara Alton. She explains the paradox of the rhu fead. Only a comyn may enter the rhu fead, she says, but only a non-comyn may touch the artifacts stored there. Ashara proposes that an individual of Terran lineage, but acclimated to Darkover, might survive the test. Using the powerful matrix screens, Ashara teleports Kathie Marshall into the tower. She is the woman who is a near duplicate of Linnell Aillard. Ashara also reveals to Lew that he has a daughter, Marguerhia, by the sister of his deceased wife.

At the annual Festival Night ball, Lew encounters Dio Ridenow. She tries to warn him that Callina has been taken over telepathically by Ashara. Lew and Regis realize that the Sharra Matrix is present at the ball. Moments later, the ball is attacked by Robert Kadarin and Dyan Ardais. Linnell Aillard is killed, along with two of Dio Ridenow's brothers. Reflecting after these events, Lew realizes that he is in love with Dio.

Lew, Callina and Kathie ride to the rhu fead. As predicted by Ashara, Kathie has absorbed Linnell's Darkovan personality, but as a non-comyn, is able retrieve the Sword of Aldones unharmed. Kadarin, carrying the Sharra sword, appears with Thyra Scott and Dyan Ardais. They demand the Sword of Aldones. Thyra attacks Lew, but they are unsuccessful in their attempt to acquire the Sword.

The survivors of the attack arrive at the spaceport HQ for medical treatment. Kadarin changes sides and claims everything that has happened was Dyan Ardais's idea. He reveals that Ardais has the Sharra Matrix and has kidnapped Marguerhia Alton. The origin of the Sharra Matrix is explained.

In a final conflict, Dyan Ardais, Kadarin, Thyra, Kathie Marshall, and Callina Aillard are killed. Regis Hastur wields the Sword of Aldones to destroy the Sharra Matrix. Dio tells Lew that Ashara Alton is not a living person, but an energy being who has resided in a matrix for centuries, and has the power to inhabit the living. Ashara has killed both Callina and Linnell Aillard in her attempt to possess the Sharra Matrix for herself.

Lew reclaims his daughter, Marguerhia, from the spaceman's orphanage. He and Dio leave Darkover with no intention of returning. Regis Hastur agrees to cooperate with the Terran Empire.

== Major characters ==
- Lewis Alton, older son of Kennard Alton
- Dio Ridenow, Lew's second wife by the end of the book
- Dyan Ardais, the book's largely unseen antagonist
- Callina Aillard, underkeeper to Ashara Alton
- Regis Hastur, Dantan Hastur's grandson
- Ashara Alton, the most powerful Keeper on Darkover
- Robert Kadarin, a half-Darkovan/half-chieri, and follower of Sharra
- The Sharra Matrix: while not sentient, the matrix is repeatedly described as a living entity

== Awards and nominations ==
- 1963, Hugo Award for Best Novel nomination

== Sources ==
- Corrick, James A. (1991). Double Your Pleasure: The Ace SF Double. Brooklyn: Gryphon Books. pp. 36–37. ISBN 0-936071-21-4.
- Tuck, Donald H. (1974). The Encyclopedia of Science Fiction and Fantasy. Chicago: Advent. pp. 64–65. ISBN 0-911682-20-1.
- The Sword of Aldones title listing at the Internet Speculative Fiction Database
