= The House Between the Worlds =

1981 novel by Marion Zimmer Bradley

- First edition (publ. Doubleday); Cover artist: Roger Zimmerman
- Author: Marion Zimmer Bradley
- Publisher: Doubleday
- Publication date: April 1, 1980
- ISBN: 978-0-385-12936-7

The House Between the Worlds is a novel by Marion Zimmer Bradley published in 1981.

== Plot summary ==
The House Between the Worlds is a novel in which graduate student Fenton experiments using drugs to cause paranormal events.

== Reception ==
Greg Costikyan reviewed The House Between the Worlds in Ares Magazine #11 and commented that "The House Between Worlds is a pleasant fantasy with more action than is usual in a Bradley novel. Since Bradley stopped writing Darkover stories, her writing has suffered; she hasn't been able to develop a theme as interesting as Darkover. In House, she's discovered her voice again. It is recommended."

== Reviews ==
- Review by Baird Searles (1980) in Isaac Asimov's Science Fiction Magazine, September 1980
- Review by Roz Kaveney (1980) in Foundation, #20 October 1980
