= The Planet Savers =

1962 novel by Marion Zimmer Bradley

- Cover of the first English language edition
- Author: Marion Zimmer Bradley
- Cover artist: Ed Emshwiller
- Language: English
- Series: Darkover
- Genre: Science fantasy
- Publisher: Ace Books
- Publication date: 1962
- Publication place: United States
- Media type: Print (paperback)
- Pages: 91
- ISBN: 1463799780
- OCLC: 17399915
- Preceded by: The Heritage of Hastur
- Followed by: The Sword of Aldones/Sharra's Exile

The Planet Savers is a science fantasy novel by American writer Marion Zimmer Bradley, part of her Darkover series. It was first published in book form in English by Ace Books in 1962, dos-à-dos with Bradley's novel The Sword of Aldones. The story first appeared in the November 1958 issue of the magazine Amazing Stories. It subsequently appeared in a German translation in 1960 with additional chapters added that were not by the author.

The Planet Savers takes place at least 152 years after the events described in Rediscovery. The story begins about two years after the events of The Heritage of Hastur, but before Sharra's Exile, because Lerrys Ridenow appears in the story.

== Plot summary ==
Desperate to discover a cure for the cyclical 48-year-fever, known as Trailmen's fever, Dr. Randall Forth persuades a colleague, Dr. Jay Allison, to undergo hypnosis. He calls forth a secondary personality, Jason Allison, who is gregarious and an experienced mountain climber, while Dr. Jay Allison is a cold, clinical man with no outdoor skills.

Jason is asked to lead an expedition into the Hellers to collect medical volunteers from among the Trailmen. Accompanying him are Rafe Scott, Regis Hastur, Kyla Raineach, a Renunciate guide, and several others. During the trip, Jay/Jason yo-yos between his two personalities – one warm and charming, the other distant and clinical. Jason, the warm personality, falls in love with Kyla.

They are attacked on the trail by a party of hostile Trailwomen. As a result of the attack, the Jay personality reappears, and is considerably more formal than the Jason personality. When they reach the Trailmen nest where Jay/Jason lived as a child, he is recognized. The party is invited into the Trailmen’s tree habitat.

The Old Ones of the Sky People (Trailmen) inquire why Jay/Jason has brought an armed party of humans to their nest. Jay/Jason explains his mission, to find a remedy for 48-year-fever. He introduces Regis Hastur to the Old Ones, and Regis also pleads for the Sky People's assistance. One hundred Trailmen volunteer. The party, with volunteers, returns to the Terran Trade City.

Some months later, a serum is developed for the treatment of 48-year-fever. Regis Hastur arrives to congratulate Jay/Jason Allison. The exposure to Regis reminds Jay/Jason of the expedition, and causes Jay/Jason to merge into a third, more stable personality.

== Characters ==
- Jay/Jason Allison
- Dr. Randall Forth, psychiatrist
- Regis Hastur, the Darkover regent's grandson
- Kyla Raineach, Renunciate back country guide
- Buck Kendricks, a spaceforce man
- Rafe Scott, half Darkovan/half Terran

== Publication history ==
- 1958, USA, Amazing Stories, pub date November 1958, magazine publication
- 1960, Germany, Utopia-Zukunftsroman OCLC 73611777, pub date 1960, in German as Dr. Allisons zweites Ich with additional material not by Bradley
- 1962, USA, Ace Books OCLC 17399915, pub date September 1962, paperback, dos-à-dos with The Sword of Aldones
- 1979, USA, Gregg Press ISBN 0-8398-2514-5, pub date 1979, hardcover
- 1979, UK, Arrow Books ISBN 0-09-919320-5, pub date 1979, paperback
- 1980, USA, Ace Books ISBN 0-441-67027-X, pub date 1980, paperback, with The Sword of Aldones, an additional short story and an article
- 1995, USA, DAW Books ISBN 0-88677-630-9, pub date April 1995, paperback, with The Winds of Darkover

== Sources ==
- Brown, Charles N.; William G. Contento (November 20, 2007). "The Locus Index to Science Fiction (1984-1998)".
- Corrick, James A. (1991). Double Your Pleasure: The Ace SF Double. Brooklyn: Gryphon Books. pp. 36–37. ISBN 0-936071-21-4.
- Tuck, Donald H. (1974). The Encyclopedia of Science Fiction and Fantasy. Chicago: Advent. p. 64. ISBN 0-911682-20-1.
- The Planet Savers title listing at the Internet Speculative Fiction Database
