= The Ruins of Isis =

1978 novel by Marion Zimmer Bradley

First edition (publ. Starblaze)

The Ruins of Isis is a novel by Marion Zimmer Bradley published in 1978.

== Plot summary ==
The Ruins of Isis is a novel about an anthropologist and her husband adapting to a planet dominated by females.

== Reception ==
Greg Costikyan reviewed The Ruins of Isis in Ares Magazine #1. Costikyan commented that "Ruins of Isis is by no means Bradley's best work; and her characters seem less well-realized than those of previous novels. On balance, however, the book is worth its [...] cover price."

== Reviews ==
- Review by Tom Easton (1980) in Analog Science Fiction/Science Fact, March 1980
- Review by Richard E. Geis (1979) in Science Fiction Review, March 1979
- Review [German] by uncredited (1980) in SF Perry Rhodan Magazin, 5/80
- Review by Brian Magorrian (1988) in Paperback Inferno, #74
