= Paul Edwin Zimmer =

American novelist

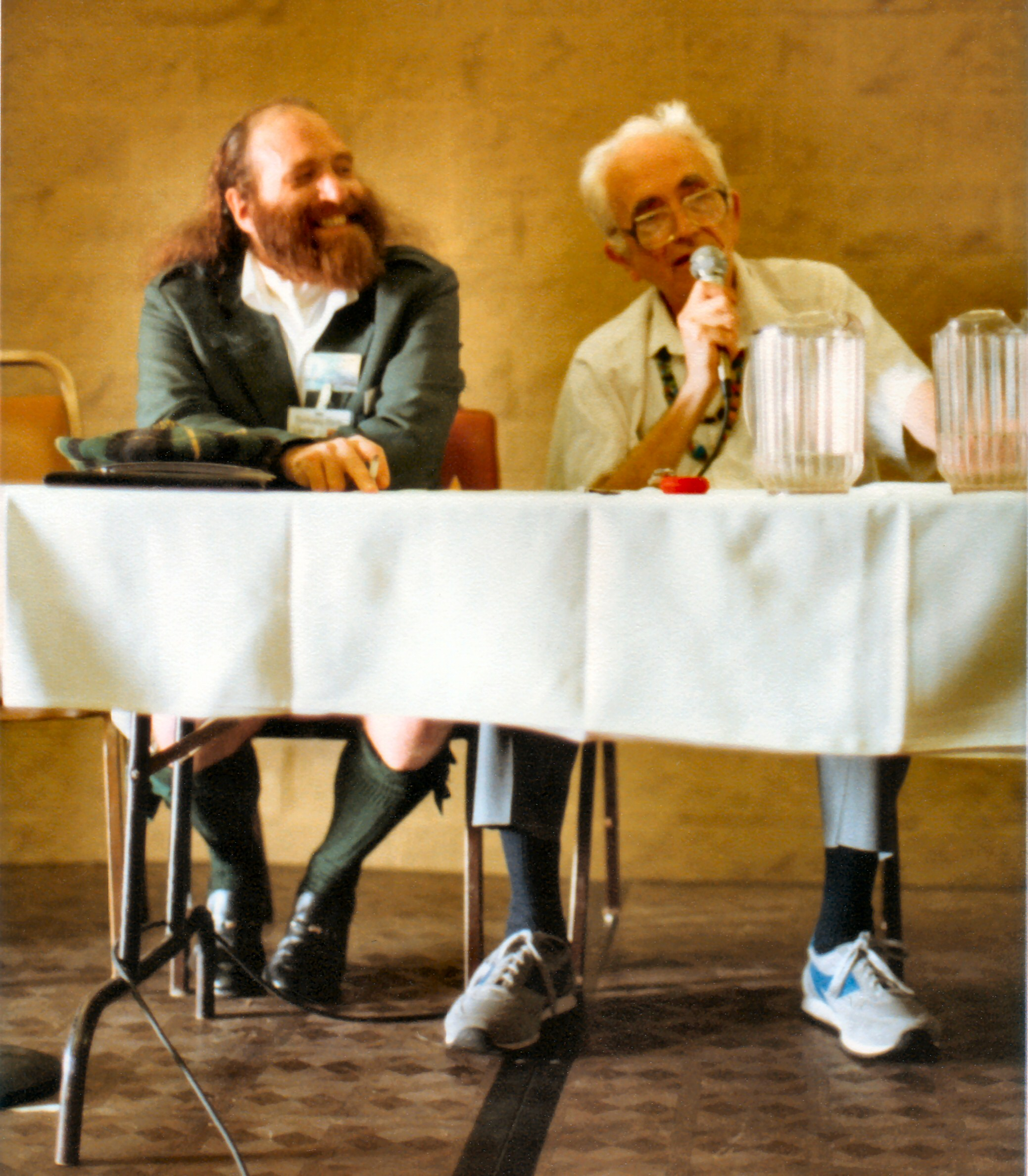
- Paul Edwin Zimmer (left) and Fritz Leiber in 1984
- Born: October 16, 1943; United States
- Died: October 18, 1997 (aged 54); Schenectady, New York, United States
- Occupations: Writer; poet; author
- Relatives: Marion Zimmer Bradley (sister)
- Writing career
- Genres: Poetry, fantasy, science fiction

Paul Edwin Zimmer (16 October 1943 – 18 October 1997) was an American poet and author.

He was also an accomplished swordsman and founding member of the Society for Creative Anachronism. His sister Marion Zimmer Bradley was also a science fiction and fantasy author.

He is best known for his Dark Border series - a set of four published books: The Lost Prince, King Chondos' Ride, A Gathering of Heroes, Ingulf the Mad and one still awaiting publication, The King who was of Old. He also co-wrote The Blood of Colyn Muir with his foster brother Don Studebaker (who writes fantasy under the name of Jon de Cles) and Hunters of the Red Moon and The Survivors with his sister. He is also supposed to have collaborated with Bradley without credit on The Spell Sword.

Some of his poetry is available in the collection A Woman of the Elf Mounds. His long poem "Logan" appeared in Jerry Pournelle's There Will Be War vol VIII. The poem is about a 19th-century First Nations leader, so it did not fit into the anthology's theme about future warfare, but Pournelle included it out of respect for its merits.

Zimmer began his writing as a poet, experimenting with Welsh and Old Norse forms before turning to prose. Nonetheless, he weaves what sounds like ancient poetry through his stories, such as the ballad of "Pertap's Ride", parts of which are scattered through the Dark Border series.

Zimmer was also one of the original members of the Society for Creative Anachronism, where he was known as Master Edwin Berserk, as well as being active in Bay Area poetry and neopagan circles. He is credited with having popularized the bardic circle originated by Karen Anderson, a self-entertainment at parties in which each participant can read, recite or sing, ask someone else to do so, or pass. Whether the credit is accurate, Zimmer was widely considered one of the best coordinators of bardic circles, and was frequently asked to run them wherever he happened to be.

Although not of Scottish heritage, Zimmer was often seen at conventions and other public occasions dressed in the MacAlpin tartan, complete with sporran. At home, he frequently wore a blue bathrobe, appearing in normal clothing only when needing to deal with officials or others outside his circle. Zimmer habitually wrote at night, and many visitors can attest to him pacing up and down as he thought through plot and wording problems, or pausing to do a martial arts dance with his swords.

Zimmer spent much of his life at Greyhaven, the sprawling communal house in Elmwood district of the Berkeley hills, the home of author Diana L. Paxson (among others), and is featured in the (out of print) Greyhaven Anthology which was edited by Marion Zimmer Bradley.

Some of the characters in Paul Edwin Zimmer's books, such as the Hastur share names with characters created by Marion Zimmer Bradley (such as those in The Heritage of Hastur). Zimmer himself claimed that the similarity of names was due only to shared influences, and the shared names are found in the older works of literature (see below).

Zimmer died while a guest of honor at Albacon, a science fiction convention in Schenectady, New York. He suffered a heart attack at the Boskone party. EMTs in the room immediately started CPR, to no avail. He was cremated and his ashes buried in the family plot in Canandaigua, NY.

== Key characters ==
Hastur, an ancient and immensely powerful being possessing both psionic and mystical abilities, leader of the Hastur clan, the guardians of the world against the dark things. Hastur himself is never seen but his descendants are; chief amongst them is Kandol Shadow-slayer, who is approximately 5000 years old.

Dark Things, evil creatures that rule the shadow, the realm founded on the mountain range of the main continent fenced in by the mystic barriers of the Hasturs.

Istvan Divega, a world-renowned swordsman who is a master of the three swords school and mercenary leader, who travels the world fighting for various kings and emperors as well as the Hasturs when required. Zimmer told his friend Bruce Byfield that Divega was based partly on watching noted science fiction and fantasy writer Fritz Leiber as an old man fencing.

Istvan is an older man who has outlived his son and wife, and who fears the onset of old age and the infirmity that it brings. Yet despite these fears his skill with the sword is undiminished. His body, although not as strong as it once was, still has its lightning quick reflexes honed through years of battle and training, while his mind is as sharp as it ever was, despite all the horrors and ruin that he has seen in his years of fighting. Istvan remains a man of principle, a man of honour, whose word once given is unbreakable. He has been summoned by his cousin Olansos the King of Tarencia to help oversee the investiture of his son prince Chondos. Olansos is aware that Chondos has personal issues that could lead to his undoing once he is gone and hopes that Istvan may aid the young prince in sorting them out before they become a danger to himself and the Kingdom at large.

Istvan bears a Hastur sword, a weapon made by the Hasturs that reacts to the presence of the dark things, and that is capable of destroying creatures of shadow and is virtually indestructible.

Despite his skill as a swordsman he is best known as Istvan the Archer - a name he hates and is ashamed of, because it refers to an incident in his youth in which he slaughtered men from afar. Ironically, it was in this incident that he first gained fame and his almost inhuman skill with the bow became known. In "A Gathering of Heroes" a famed Elven archer tells Istvan that it has been almost a century since he has seen a mortal shoot as well as Istvan.

Martos of Onantunga, a young hero who has come to Tarencia seeking fame in the long struggle against the creatures of the Dark Border. He is the foremost student of Birthran of Kadar an old friend of Istvan Divega who is also a sword master of the 3 swords school. He struggles to balance his sense of honor against his love of fame and his need to make his way in the world, and his wish for accomplishment against his sense of responsibility for his pregnant lover Kumari. When tragedy results in civil war, he finds himself pitted strategically—and, occasionally, personally --- against Istvan Divega in a clash that, as in the Iliad, has no right or wrong side and could be a tragedy for both.

Ironfist Arac, A giant warrior who is famed for his freakish strength and legendary skill with the axe. An old comrade of Istvan, he leads a mercenary troop of Carrodian Axe men, a form of heavy infantry. They have been hired by the King of Tarencia to help patrol the dark border.

Svaran, Commander of the armies of Sarlow and their deadliest warrior. He is not as skillful or as fast as Grom Beardless or as strong as Vor Half Troll his lieutenants. However, he wears a close fitting suit of dwarf forged plate armour that is proof against mystic Hastur and Elven swords, rendering Svaran virtually invulnerable in combat. He is sometimes known as Svaran the Invincible or the Black. He appears in "A Gathering of Heroes" and "Ingulf the Mad".

Grom Beardless, a Captain of the armies of Sarlow, an exceptionally skilled warrior and deadly swordsman who is feared and respected throughout the Island continent of Y'Gora. He is acknowledged even by the sorcerers of Sarlow as their best swordsman. He appears in "A Gathering of Heroes" and "Ingulf the Mad".

Carroll Mac Lir, Most famous of the heroes of Y'gora, a former slave of the Sarlowaq he escaped and discovered the mystic sword he now bears, which was said to belong to the last great hero of the former realm now known as Sarlow before its conquest by the Sarlowaq. He has fought all along the borders of the three kingdoms that lie on the edges of the vast forest of demons on the Island continent of Y'Gora battling the armies of Sarlow and their allies the Norians. He has fought Svaran the invincible and Grom Beardless and lived to tell the tale. He appears in "A Gathering of Heroes" and "Ingulf the Mad".

== Books and short stories of the Dark Border ==
Short stories

- "The Shadow of Tugar" [Istvan DiVega], (ss) Fantasy Book Vol. 2 No. 3, August 1983
- "The Wolves of Sarlow" [Prince Tahion], (nv) Fantasy Book Vol. 3 No. 3, September 1984
- "A Swordsman from Carcosa" [Istvan DiVega], (nv) Fantasy Book Vol. 5 No. 1, March 1986 & Vol. 5 No. 2, June 1986
- "The Vision of Aldamir", (ss) Marion Zimmer Bradley's Fantasy Magazine Vol. 1 No. 2, Autumn 1988
- "Iontioren's Tale", (ss) Return To Avalon Jennifer Roberson, editor - Publisher: DAW Fantasy (January, 1996)
- "Seal-Woman's Power", (ss) Sword and Sorceress XV Marion Zimmer Bradley, editor - Publisher: DAW Fantasy (January, 1998)
- "The Border Women", (nv) Marion Zimmer Bradley's Fantasy Worlds Rachel E. Holmen and Marion Zimmer Bradley, editors - Publisher: Marion Zimmer Bradley Literary Works Trust (September, 1998)

Novels

- The Dark Border Vol. 1: The Lost Prince - Publisher: Berkley (September 15, 1983)
- The Dark Border Vol. 2: King Chondos' Ride - Publisher: Berkley (September 15, 1983)
- A Gathering of Heroes - Publisher: Ace Books (August 1987)
- Ingulf the Mad - Publisher: Ace Books (June 1989)
