= The Catch Trap =

1979 novel by Marion Zimmer Bradley

- First edition cover
- Author: Marion Zimmer Bradley
- Language: English
- Genre: Fiction
- Publisher: Random House
- Publication date: 1979
- Publication place: United States
- Media type: Print (hardback and paperback)
- Pages: 589 (first edition, hardback)
- ISBN: 978-0345280909
- Dewey Decimal: 813.54

The Catch Trap is a 1979 novel by American writer Marion Zimmer Bradley set in the U.S. circus world of the 1940s-1950s, centering on the professional and romantic partnership of two trapeze artists.

== Synopsis ==
Tommy Zane, a lion tamer’s son with a gift for flying, becomes protege and catcher to star flyer Mario Santelli. As their act rises to fame, the pair navigate family tensions, risks of the “triple,” and the constraints of mid-century morality on their secret relationship.

== Reception ==
Critics highlighted Bradley’s detailed depiction of flying trapeze and the novel’s treatment of a same-sex relationship under mid-century norms. The book is sometimes recommended in lists of LGBTQ historical fiction.

Upon release, Kirkus Reviews described it as “homosexual passion under the Big Top pursued with considerable verve” praising the circus detail.
