= Four Moons of Darkover =

1988 anthology edited by Marion Zimmer Bradley

- Cover of the first edition
- Author: Edited by Marion Zimmer Bradley
- Cover artist: Richard Hescox
- Language: English
- Series: Darkover
- Genre: Fantasy; Science fiction
- Publisher: DAW Books
- Publication date: 1988
- Publication place: United States
- Media type: Print (paperback)
- Pages: 284
- ISBN: 0-88677-305-9
- OCLC: 18723486

Four Moons of Darkover is an anthology of fantasy and science fiction short stories edited by Marion Zimmer Bradley. The stories are set in Bradley's world of Darkover. The book was first published by DAW Books (No. 761) in November 1988.

== Contents ==
- Introduction by Marion Zimmer Bradley
- "The Jackal" by Vera Nazarian
- "Death's Scepter" by Joan Marie Verba
- "A King's Ransom" by Kay Morgan Douglas
- "Man of Impulse" by Marion Zimmer Bradley
- "Swarm Song" by Roxana Pierson
- "Out of Ashes" by Patricia B. Cirone
- "My Father’s Son" by Meg Mac Donald
- "House Rules" by Marion Zimmer Bradley
- "To Challenge Fate" by Sandra C. Morrese
- "The Devourer Within" by Margaret L. Carter
- "Sin Catenas" by Elisabeth Waters
- "Circles" by G. R. Sixbury
- "Festival Night" by Dorothy J. Heydt
- "A Laughing Matter" by Rachel Walker
- "Mourning" by Audrey J. Fulton
- "The Death of Brendon Ensolare" by Deborah Wheeler
- "Sort of Chaos" by Millea Kenin

== Sources ==
- Brown, Charles N.; William G. Contento (2007-11-20). "The Locus Index to Science Fiction (1984-1998)".
- Reginald, Robert (1992). Science Fiction and Fantasy Literature 1975-1991. Detroit: Gale Research. pp. 116. ISBN 0-8103-1825-3.
- Silver, Steven. "DAW Books List". SF Site. Archived from the original on 2004-02-15.
- Four Moons of Darkover title listing at the Internet Speculative Fiction Database
