= The Children of Kings =

2013 novel by Marion Zimmer Bradley and Deborah J. Ross

- Author: Marion Zimmer Bradley and Deborah J. Ross
- Cover artist: Matt Stawicki
- Language: English
- Series: Darkover
- Genre: Science fiction
- Publisher: DAW Books
- Publication date: March 2013
- Publication place: United States
- Media type: Print (hardcover)
- Pages: 381
- Preceded by: The Alton Gift
- Followed by: The Laran Gambit

The Children of Kings is a science fiction novel by American writers Marion Zimmer Bradley and Deborah J. Ross in the Darkover series. It was first published by in hardcover by DAW Books in 2013. The book is the second part of the "Children of Kings" duology.

The book starts about two years after the events in The Alton Gift, and is a direct continuation of that story. The book falls in the Darkover time period that the publisher has labeled "Modern Darkover", set after the departure of the Terran Federation.

== Characters ==
=== Comyn ===
- Gareth Marius-Danvan Elhalyn y Hastur, Heir to Elhalyn and to the Crown of the Comyn.
- Danilo Hastur, Gareth's father and the son of the late Regis Hastur.
- Miralys Elhalyn, Gareth's mother, the heiress of the Elhalyn Domain
- Mikhail Lanart-Hastur, Regent of the Comyn.
- Marguerida Alton-Hastur, Mikhail's wife.
- Linnea Storn, Gareth's grandmother and Regis Hastur's wife, Keeper of the Comyn Tower
- Danilo Ardais-Syrtis, the paxman and bredhyu to the late Regis Hastur, a close family friend.
- Domenic Alton-Hastur, Mikhail and Marguerida's son.
- Narsin, old retainer of the Elhalyn family
- Jeremiah Reed aika Jeram, Terrana renegade who had remained on Darkoven when the Federation left.
- Vistarin of Temora, a Comyn courtier
- Octavien MacEwain, a Comyn courtier
- Rufus DiAsturien
- Lorrill Vallonde, had schemed to match his daughter with Domenic.
- Illona Rider, underkeeper of Neskaya Tower and the nedestro daughter of Lord Ardais, betrothed to Domenic.
- Michala, a monito on loan from Dalereuth Tower.
- Raynelle, a junior monitor
- Silvana of Nevarsin aka Kierestelli Hastur, the Keeper of Nevarsin Tower, the daughter of Regis and Linnea raised by the chieri.
- Danilo Syrtis-Ardais, paxman to the late Regis Hastur.
- Lew Alton, the old Lord Alton, Marguerida Alton's father, retired to Nevarsin after two heart attacks.
- Hermes Aldaran, former Senator to the Terran Federation.

=== Dry Towners ===
- Cyrillon Sensar, a Dry Towner merchant who has dealings with Gareth and Domenic.
- Rahelle, Cyrillon's daughter
- Rakhal, Cyrillon's apprentice
- Korllen, cook of Cyrillon's trading party
- Tomas, Alric, members of Cyrillon's trading party
- Dayan, Lord of Shainsa.
- Merach, the sword arm of Dayan
- Hayat, Dayan's son
- Rivoth, the headman of Korllen's home village
- Adahab, Rivot's eldest son

=== Terrans ===
- Poulos, a Terran arms dealer and smuggler, the captain of the Lamonica.
- Offenbach, the ship's mate
- Robard, Taz, Viss, Jory, Lakrin are the crew of the Lamonica
- Cuinn, a village headman dealing with Poulos
- Harris, the captain of the Grissom, a Terranan rebel ship in need of repair
- Dauntless, a supposed Federation ship in pursuit of the Grissom
- Jeram aka Jeremiah Reed, a Terranan regenade who stayed on Darkover when the Federation left.

=== Chieri ===
- David Hamilton, the Terran doctor from The World Wreckers, living with the chieri
- Keral, a chieri, David Hamilton's mate and Kierestelli's foster parent.
- Lianantheren, child of David and Keral, Kierestelli's foster sibling.
- Diravanariel, the chieri elder who cast Kierestelli out.

== Publication history ==
- Mar 2013, DAW Books (DAW Collectors #1615), 978-0-7564-0797-1, 381pp, hardcover
- Jul 2013, DAW Books/SFBC, #1375945, 381pp, hardcover
- Mar 2014, DAW Books (DAW Collectors #1615), 978-0-7564-0854-1, 453pp, paperback
