= A Gathering of Heroes =

1987 novel by Paul Edwin Zimmer

- Cover of the 1987 Ace Books edition
- Author: Paul Edwin Zimmer
- Language: English
- Publication date: 1987

A Gathering of Heroes is a 1987 fantasy novel by American writer Paul Edwin Zimmer. It is the third book in the Dark Border books and fuses classic high fantasy with science fiction.

== Plot ==
A Gathering of Heroes is a prequel, taking place approximately twenty years before the events in The Lost Prince and King Chondos' Ride. Istvan Divega, a mercenary and famed swordsman, is approached by a mysterious figure with an urgent request for aid. He joins a band of heroes on a journey to defend the fortress city of Rath Tintallain against a great army that includes sorcerers, goblins, demons and werewolves.

Goblins, demons and worse spill over the Dark Border, attacking Rath Tintallain and the priceless treasure it holds. The Hasturs fear that the fall of Rath Tintallain will bring utter destruction, and summon a gathering of the greatest heroes-elves, dwarves, and mortal men- for a desperate stand. And Istvan DiVega is called to join the fray, fighting shoulder to shoulder with men of legend. They are the last defense against the Shadow.

== Dark Border books ==
- The Lost Prince ISBN 0-425-06552-9
- ASIN 0867211776, King Chondos' Ride
- ASIN 0441274218, A Gathering of Heroes
- ASIN 0441370942, Ingulf the Mad
