= Star of Danger =

1965 novel by Marion Zimmer Bradley

- Cover of the first edition
- Author: Marion Zimmer Bradley
- Language: English
- Series: Darkover
- Genre: Science fantasy
- Publisher: Ace Books
- Publication date: 1965
- Publication place: United States
- Media type: Print (paperback)
- Pages: 160
- OCLC: 11204698
- Preceded by: City of Sorcery
- Followed by: The Winds of Darkover

Star of Danger is a science fantasy novel by American writer Marion Zimmer Bradley, part of her Darkover series. It was first published by Ace Books in 1965.

Bradley states in "Author's Notes on Chronology" that in her view, Star of Danger occurs about thirty years after the events in The Spell Sword.

== Plot summary ==
Wade Montray, a civil servant of the Terran Empire, is transferred from Earth to Darkover. He is a widower with a teenaged son, Larry, who is fascinated by this alien world. Larry has learned the rudiments of the Darkovan language from tapes, and wants to explore outside the confines of the Terran Spaceport complex and the Trade City.

During his first solo exploration, Larry runs into a gang of street toughs. A local, Kennard Alton, intervenes. After Larry comports himself well in a one-on-one fight with one of the toughs, Alton invites him to his father's home to share a meal. Alton explains some of the Darkovan customs. Valdir Alton, Kennard's father, arrives home and invites Larry to return to his home when he wishes.

Larry returns to his quarters where his father, Wade, is furious with his son's adventure and confines him to the spaceport. Larry promised to lend some books to Kennard and realizes the Darkovans will consider it a grave insult if he fails to return to the Alton home. Against his father's wishes, he takes the books to Kennard.

Valdir Alton introduces Larry to Lorill Hastur, the head of Darkover's governing council. Hastur questions Larry about his motivations for returning to the Alton home. Larry's answers please Hastur, and he expresses his approval. Again, Larry is invited to return, but says his father probably won't allow another visit.

Wade Montray is predictably angry and forbids his son's return to the city. His commander tells him they've heard from the Darkovan council, and they're offended by his action, as if they are unfit company for his son. The Altons invited Larry to spend the summer at Armida, and Terran command recommends that Wade agree in the interest of diplomatic relations.

Larry begins to feel more comfortable with the local customs after a couple of weeks at Armida. Kennard, Larry, Lord Alton and their guardsmen are out riding when they encounter a forest fire. Larry joins the others to fight the fire, but it turns out to be a diversion set by raiding bandits who have attacked a nearby village. Valdir's men track the bandits to a canyon, where Larry is taken prisoner during a fight. The bandits believe him to be Kennard Alton. In an attempt to gain information, they drug him with kirian.

The real Kennard Alton rescues Larry and they escape into the mountains. In the course of their escape, the two boys learn much about each other's cultures, and realize that each has benefits and drawbacks. Larry's latent telepathic abilities emerge under the stress of the journey. They encounter Trailmen, banshee-birds and a chieri, who reveals to Kennard that the Darkovans are of Terran origin and returns them, by teleportation, to the spaceport.

Kennard tells his father that he wishes to leave Darkover to attend school. Larry decides to remain on Darkover, living with the Altons. Under pressure from Valdir Alton, Wade Montray tells Larry that his mother was a daughter of Aldaran, and one of the Comyn.

== Major characters ==
- Larry Montray, son of Wade Montray
- Wade Montray, a Terran administrator
- Kennard Alton, son of Kennard Alton
- Valdir Alton, Kennard's father, Lord Alton
- Lorill Hastur, head of the governing council of Darkover
- Cyrillon, a bandit

== Publication history ==
- 1965, US, Ace Books OCLC 11204698, pub date 1965, paperback (later printings with ISBN 0-441-77945-X)
- 1967, Germany, Pebel OCLC 73904146, pub date 1967, paperback, in German as Die Kräfte der Comyn
- 1979, US, Gregg Press ISBN 0-7278-4513-6, pub date 1979, hardcover
- 1978, UK, Arrow Books ISBN 0-09-916620-8, pub date 1978, paperback
- 1993, UK, Severn House ISBN 0-7278-4513-6, pub date September 1993, hardcover
- 1993, IT, Tascabili degli Editori Associati (TEA) ISBN 88-7819-375-5, pub date 1993, paperback
- 1994, US, DAW Books ISBN 0-88677-607-4, pub date July 1994, paperback
