= Thunderlord! =

2016 novel by Deborah J. Ross

- Cover of the first edition
- Author: Marion Zimmer Bradley
- Cover artist: Matthew Stawicki
- Language: English
- Series: Darkover
- Genre: Science fantasy
- Publisher: DAW Books
- Publication date: 2016
- Publication place: United States
- Media type: Print (paperback)
- Pages: 364
- ISBN: 978-0-7564-1054-4
- Preceded by: Stormqueen!
- Followed by: The Fall of Neskaya

Thunderlord! is a 2016 science fiction novel written by Deborah J. Ross. Although the 24th novel published in the Darkover saga, it is the third book in chronological order.

== Plot ==
A generation after a time period known in the Darkover universe as The Age of Chaos a character by the name Gwynn has lost his family in the conflict. His life's ambition has become plotting revenge against those who caused his family's loss. He seeks to marry a woman with the genetic power to control the storms, in hopes that his offspring will use it to against Aldaran.

Kyria, his selected bride, is attracted to Gwynn because of his financial status and other reasons. During her journey through the mountains to Scathfell, where she will formally wed, she and her sister come across Edric, a young heir to Aldaran. Edric also possesses the power to control thunderstorms, a power he has been warned to be cautious of because of the mass danger it poses to all.

Their companionship brings them closer and creates an opportunity for their arch-rival kingdoms to unite.
