= Falcons of Narabedla =

1964 novel by Marion Zimmer Bradley

- Cover of the first edition
- Author: Marion Zimmer Bradley
- Language: English
- Series: Darkover
- Genre: Science fiction
- Publisher: Ace Books
- Publication date: 1964
- Publication place: United States
- Media type: Print (paperback)
- Pages: 127
- OCLC: 17399903

Falcons of Narabedla is a science fiction novel by American writer Marion Zimmer Bradley set in the universe of her Darkover series. It was first published in book form in English by Ace Books in 1964, as an Ace Double with Bradley's collection The Dark Intruder and Other Stories on the other side. The story first appeared in the May 1957 issue of the magazine Other Worlds.

The name "Narabedla" is an anadrome of the star name "Aldebaran".

== Plot introduction ==
The novel concerns a person who is transported into the future and an alien world where Terrans and Darkovans have meshed and become decadent.

== Sources ==
- Brown, Charles N.; William G. Contento (November 20, 2007). "The Locus Index to Science Fiction (1984-1998)".
- Corrick, James A. (1991). Double Your Pleasure: The Ace SF Double. Brooklyn: Gryphon Books. p. 40. ISBN 0-936071-21-4.
- Tuck, Donald H. (1974). The Encyclopedia of Science Fiction and Fantasy. Chicago: Advent. p. 64. ISBN 0-911682-20-1.
- Falcons of Narabedla title listing at the Internet Speculative Fiction Database
