= The Shadow Matrix =

1996 novel by Marion Zimmer Bradley and Adrienne Martine-Barnes

- First edition
- Author: Marion Zimmer Bradley and Adrienne Martine-Barnes
- Cover artist: Romas Kukalis
- Language: English
- Series: Darkover
- Genre: Science fiction
- Publisher: DAW Books
- Publication date: September 1997
- Publication place: United States
- Media type: Print (hardcover)
- Pages: 512
- Preceded by: Exile's Song
- Followed by: Traitor's Sun

The Shadow Matrix is a science fiction novel by Marion Zimmer Bradley and Adrienne Martine-Barnes in the Darkover series. It was first published by in hardcover by DAW Books in 1996. Since the book involves time travel, it falls in both the Darkover time periods that the author called "Against the Terrans: The Second Age (after the Comyn)" and in the Ages of Chaos.

In terms of Darkover's timeline, the book starts place about a year after Exile's Song, and is a continuation of that story.

== Plot summary ==
=== Part One ===
Mikhail Lanart-Hastur is sent to the isolated Elhalyn estate to check on Priscilla Elhayln and her children. He discovers that Priscilla is deranged, under the influence of a "hedge-witch", Emelda, and finds that the children are severely neglected. With the assistance of his tower-trained sister, Liriel, he is able to free the children from Emelda, though Priscilla dies in the process. Throughout his journey, he is accompanied by a crow.

Marguerida Alton undertakes the study of matrix science at Arilinn Tower, though she does not get along well with the keeper or her fellow students. They are uneasy about her "shadow matrix", the outlines of a matrix that glow in her right hand (from Exile's Song).

=== Part Two ===
Mikhail and his sister, Liriel, arrive at Comyn Castle with the five Elhalyn children. He describes to his uncle, Regis, his experiences at Elhalyn, explaining that none of the three boys are suitable to serve in the traditional role of Elhalyn king.

At the annual Midwinter Ball, a thunderous voice cries, "To Hali, now!" which Mikhail and Marguerida understand is a command for them. They ride to the ruins of Hali Tower, and upon entering, find themselves in the distant past.

=== Part Three ===
The only resident of Hali Tower is its keeper, Amalie El Haliene, who tells them that the legendary laranzu, Varzil the Good, is living, but in hiding. Mikhail and Marguerida realize that he has sent for them, and determine to find him, despite the dangers.

At small lake cottage, they encounter the elderly Varzil the Good. Varzil says that he must pass his matrix ring to Mikhail, which requires the couple be united in marriage, so they can join their powers together. It becomes clear that Varzil intends to send the ring back to their present time, to protect it from capture by the powerful leronis, Ashara Alton (from Exile's Song).

Having managed the ring-swap, Varzil vanishes, stranding Mikhail and Marguerida in the Ages of Chaos. After a month or more, they return to Hali Tower, and traverse time into their own present. They are rescued by Lew Alton, and returned to Thendara.

While no one is happy about the marriage, because it concentrates too much power in a single couple, they eventually accept it as fait accompli. Regis Hastur's son, Dani, resolves this problem by saying that he will serve as the traditional Elhalyn King by marrying Miralys Elhalyn, while suggesting that Mikhail serve as the power behind the throne, just as the Hastur have done for generations. His unexpected solution is accepted.

== Characters ==
- Mikhail Lanart-Hastur, Regent of the Elhayln Domain.
- Marguerida Alton (aka Margaret; aka Marja), daughter of Lew Alton.
- Regis Hastur, the Regent of Darkover.
- The Elhalyn children: Vincent, Emun, Alain, Valenta and Miralys.
- Varzil Ridenow (aka Varzil the Good), a powerful laranzu from the Ages of Chaos.

== Publication history ==
- September 1997, DAW Books (DAW Collectors #1055), ISBN 0-88677-743-7, 512pp, hardcover
- September 1997, DAW Books / SFBC, #17845, 483pp, hardcover
- January 1999, DAW Books (DAW Collectors #1065), ISBN 0-88677-812-3, 556pp, paperback
