= Marion Zimmer Bradley's Darkover =

1993 book by Marion Zimmer Bradley

- Cover of the first edition
- Author: Marion Zimmer Bradley
- Cover artist: Richard Hescox
- Language: English
- Series: Darkover
- Genre: Science fantasy
- Publisher: DAW Books
- Publication date: 1993
- Publication place: United States
- Media type: Print (paperback)
- Pages: 335
- ISBN: 0-88677-593-0
- OCLC: 28903721
- LC Class: MLC R CP00841

Marion Zimmer Bradley's Darkover is a collection of science fantasy short stories by American writer Marion Zimmer Bradley. The stories are set in Bradley's world of Darkover. The book was first published by DAW Books (No. 929) in October 1993.

The stories are divided into four sections, each preceded by a brief overview of Bradley's thoughts on that category's main subject(s). Some of the stories were previously unpublished, notably the "Hilary" stories that had been intended as drafts for a proposed novel about the character Hilary Castamir. Other stories in this collection originally appeared in previous Darkover anthologies edited by Bradley, although not all of her previous anthology contributions are reprinted here.

== Contents ==
- Introduction
- "Free Amazons"
  - "To Keep the Oath"
  - "Amazon Fragment" (from the first draft of Thendara House)
  - "House Rules"
  - "Knives"
- "Hilary"
  - "Firetrap", with Elisabeth Waters
  - "The Keeper's Price", with Elisabeth Waters
  - "The Lesson of the Inn"
  - "Hilary's Homecoming"
  - "Hilary's Wedding"
- "Rohana"
  - "Everything but Freedom"
- "Dyan Ardais"
  - "Oathbreaker"
  - "The Hawk-Master's Son"
  - "Man of Impulse"
  - "The Shadow"

== Sources ==
- Brown, Charles N.; William G. Contento (November 20, 2007). "The Locus Index to Science Fiction (1984-1998)".
- Silver, Steven. "DAW Books List". SF Site. Archived from the original on May 22, 2004.
- Marion Zimmer Bradley's Darkover title listing at the Internet Speculative Fiction Database
