= Hawkmistress! =

1982 novel by Marion Zimmer Bradley

- Cover of the first edition
- Author: Marion Zimmer Bradley
- Cover artist: Hannah M. G. Shapero
- Language: English
- Series: Darkover
- Genre: Science fantasy
- Publisher: DAW Books
- Publication date: 1982
- Publication place: United States
- Media type: Print (paperback)
- Pages: 336
- ISBN: 0-87997-762-0
- OCLC: 8723902
- LC Class: CPB Box no. 2892 vol. 2
- Preceded by: The Fall of Neskaya
- Followed by: A Flame in Hali, Two to Conquer

Hawkmistress! is a science fantasy novel by American writer Marion Zimmer Bradley, part of the Darkover series at the end of Ages of Chaos, in the period of Darkover's history known as the Hundred Kingdoms. Chapters 35 and 46–50 of Zandru's Forge overlap with the story in Hawkmistress!.

In Hawkmistress!, Bradley explores issues regarding the right to self-determination of minors, the place of women in a traditional society, and the conflicts between Darkover's two major religious belief systems. She also continues the theme of Darkover society's developing acceptance of homosexuality, through the character of Orain.

== Plot summary ==
Romilly MacAran has the laran gift of her family – the ability to merge with the minds of animals. She uses this gift to train hawks and horses. When she reaches the age of fifteen (womanhood, in Darkover's terms), her father refuses to allow her to continue working with animals on the grounds that it isn't ladylike. He gives her prized hawk, Preciosa, to her brother, who has no gift. He also refuses her requests for an education.

When Romilly learns that her father intends to marry her off to a three-times widower, Garris of Scathfell, she realizes that leaving home is her only option. Dressed as a boy, she escapes with a horse from the stables.

Calling herself Rumal, she heads towards Nevarsin. Her hawk, Preciosa, appears in the sky, and provides her with a freshly killed bird, the first meal she has had in several days. Her fire attracts a company of men, headed by Dom Carlo and Dom Orain, who have three sick sentry birds that need care. They, too, are headed to Nevarsin, and Romilly takes over the care of their birds. Romilly reveals that she is a cristoforo. Dom Carlo claims to be a kinsman of the deposed king, Carolin, and is fleeing his cousin, Rakhal, who has taken the throne by force.

At Nevarsin, the company enters the cristoforo monastery of St. Valentine of the Snows. Romilly discovers that Caryl, the son of Lyondri Hastur, one of Dom Carlo's bitterest enemies, is a student at the monastery. Romilly warns Orain.

Orain and Carlo believe themselves betrayed, and leave the monastery, taking Caryl Hastur as a hostage. Caryl is put in Romilly's care.

At an inn in Caer Donn, Orain makes a pass at Romilly, believing her to be a boy, and is shocked to discover that she is a girl. He takes her to the hostel of the Sisterhood of the Sword where his cousin, Jandria, lives. He also asks Jandria to take charge of Caryl Hastur. Romilly becomes a member of the Sisterhood. A contingent of the Sisterhood join Carolin's forces. Romilly's hawk, Preciosa, reappears.

At Jandria's request, Romilly accompanies Caryl back to his father in Hali city. Romilly returns to Jandria with medical supplies. At Serrais, Romilly is assigned to train horses, among them a black stallion whom she names Sunstar. She and Jandria deliver the horses to Carolin's camp, where her brother, Ruyven, is also engaged caring for the sentry birds. At that time, Romilly discovers that "Dom Carlo" is actually King Carolin Hastur.

Several days later, the two armies engage in battle. Carolin learns that Lyondri is holding Orain and threatening to kill him. Romilly sneaks into the city, and is able to find Orain's location. She meets Caryl, who out of disgust with his father's torture of Orain, agrees to help free him. They return to Carolin's camp.

Romilly decides to enter Tramontana tower for laran training.

== Major characters ==
- Romilly MacAran: The main character of the novel. At age 15, she runs away from home disguised as a boy to avoid an arranged marriage to Dom Garris of Scathfell. In her coming of age, she discovers latent psychic powers, befriends a king and saves an empire.
- Dom Carlo / King Carolin: Exiled king of the Hasturs of Hali.
- Lord Orain of Castamir: King Carolin's paxman and a "lover of men".
- Caryl Hastur, the twelve-year-old son of Lyondri Hastur.
- Jandria, cousin of Orain of Castamir, and a member of the Sisterhood of the Sword.
- Maura Elhalyn, leronis of Tramontana.

== Publication history ==
Cover of a later reprint.

- 1982, USA, DAW Books ISBN 0-87997-762-0, pub date September 1982, paperback
- 1985, UK, Arrow Books ISBN 0-09-934990-6, pub date 1985, paperback
- 1988, UK, Severn House ISBN 0-7278-1607-1, pub date June 1988, hardcover
- 1997, Czech republic, Knižní Klub, ISBN 80-7176-491-4, pub date 1997, hardcover, Czech translation by Ivana Muková

== Reception ==
Dave Langford reviewed Hawkmistress! for White Dwarf #75, and stated that "overall, it's a readable yarn which is essentially historical romance – for SF fans who wouldn't be seen dead with your average bodice-ripper novel, but enjoy the camouflaged version".

== Reviews ==
- Review by Debbie Notkin (1982) in Locus #261, October 1982
- Review by Lynn F. Williams (1982) in Science Fiction & Fantasy Book Review #9, November 1982
- Review by Paul McGuire (1983) in Science Fiction Review, November 1983
- Review by Margaret Hall (1986) in Paperback Inferno #61
- Review by Terry Jeeves (1986) in Out of the Woodwork! #1
