= Traitor's Sun =

1998 novel by Marion Zimmer Bradley and Adrienne Martine-Barnes

- First edition
- Author: Marion Zimmer Bradley and Adrienne Martine-Barnes
- Cover artist: Romas Kukalis
- Language: English
- Series: Darkover
- Genre: Science fiction novel
- Publisher: DAW Books
- Publication date: 1999
- Publication place: United States
- English publication date: Jan 1999
- Media type: Print (hardcover)
- Pages: 483
- Preceded by: The Shadow Matrix
- Followed by: The Alton Gift

Traitor's Sun is a science fiction novel by American writers Marion Zimmer Bradley and Adrienne Martine-Barnes in the Darkover series. It was first published by in hardcover by DAW Books in 1998. The book falls in the Darkover time periods that the author called "Against the Terrans: The Second Age (after the Comyn)".

In terms of Darkover's timeline, the book starts fifteen years after The Shadow Matrix, and is a continuation of that story.

== Plot summary ==
On Darkover, Regis Hastur, the planet's regent for many years, suffers a stroke and dies. As the Comyn gather for the funeral, Lew Alton (former senator) and Herm Aldaran (current senator) discuss the growth of the Expansionist Party in the Federation Senate. They agree this means nothing good for Darkover.

While standing guard duty in Thendara, Nico Hastur, Mikhail and Marguerida's son, observes the activities of a Traveler troupe. He particularly notices a red-haired girl named Illona Rider. The next evening, while watching a Traveler show, Nico overhears two Terran operatives discussing plans to ambush the Comyn during Regis Hastur's funeral. Nico realizes that the two Terran agents are disguised as Travelers.

Nico telepathically contacts his grandfather, Lew, and informs him of what he has overheard. Lew advises Nico to remain where he is and sends Herm Aldaran, along with a few Renunciates, to join him. They shadow the Travelers, and Nico cultivates a friendship with Illona.

At a small village, the Travelers perform a seditious puppet show, causing a riot. Several people are killed. Nico learns from Illona that a man named Mathias, who has recently joined their troupe, is trying to stir up resentment against the Comyn with his plays. Nico realizes that Mathias has been quite successful in his propaganda efforts.

Between Nico and Herm's efforts, and information from Rafe Scott, the outlines of the Terran plot take shape. It becomes clear that Lyle Belfontaine, the ambitious Terran station chief, intends to take military action against the Comyn during the funeral procession.

The Comyn make the trip to the rhu fead to inter Regis, leaving Lew Alton and a complement of guardsmen behind in Comyn Castle. At a small village, Nico, Illona, and Herm join the funeral procession. Nico reveals his belief that Dyan-Gabriel Ardais is Illona’s father, which is later determined to be true.

At Comyn Castle, Lew Alton, Cisco Ridenow, Valenta Elhalyn, and others, await the arrival of a Terran strike force. Working in a circle, they cause the Terran soldiers to flee by amplifying the personal fears each man holds in his mind. They capture Belfontaine and return him to the spaceport. A separate Terran force attacks the funeral procession on the Old North Road. Mikhail and Marguerida use their ability to join matrixes to protect the Comyn from the attackers. Among the attackers is Francisco Ridenow, who has turned traitor. He is repelled, but not killed.

Lew and Marguerida join forces to make the surviving Terrans forget that the battle was fought with laran rather than physical weapons.

Several months later, the Terrans abandon the spaceport and Darkover.

== Major characters ==
- Mikhail Lanart-Hastur, Regent of Darkover.
- Marguerida Alton-Hastur, Mikhail's wife.
- Domenic Hastur (aka Nico), Mikhail and Marguerida's son.
- Lew Alton, Marguerida's father.
- Rafe Scott, Marguerida's uncle and a retired spaceport worker.
- Herm Aldaran, former Senator to the Terran Federation.
- Illona Rider, a Traveler girl, a nedestra Ardais daughter.
- Lyle Belfontaine, Terran spaceport station chief.
- Dirck Vancof, Terran intelligence operative.

== Publication history ==
- Jan 1999, DAW Books, 0-88677-810-7, 483pp, hardcover
- May 1999, DAW Books / SFBC, #18146, 483pp, hardcover
- Feb 2000, DAW Books (DAW Collectors #1109), 0-88677-811-5, 534pp, paperback
