= Marion Zimmer Bradley =

American author (1930–1999)

- Born: Marion Eleanor Zimmer; June 3, 1930; Albany, New York, U.S.
- Died: September 25, 1999 (aged 69); Berkeley, California, U.S.
- Education: University of California, Berkeley; Hardin-Simmons University (BA)
- Occupations: Novelist, editor
- Spouses: Robert Alden Bradley (m. 1949; div. 1964); Walter Breen (m. 1964; div. 1990)
- Children: 3
- Relatives: Paul Edwin Zimmer (brother)
- Writing career
- Pen name: Morgan Ives, Miriam Gardner, John Dexter, Lee Chapman, Elfrida Rivers, Elfrida of Greenwalls, John Jay Wells (with Juanita Coulson), Astra
- Genres: Fantasy, science fiction, science fantasy, historical fantasy
- Notable works: The Mists of Avalon, the Darkover series
- Website: mzbworks.com

Marion Eleanor Zimmer Bradley (June 3, 1930 – September 25, 1999) was an American author of fantasy, historical fantasy, science fiction, and science fantasy novels and is best known for the Arthurian fiction novel The Mists of Avalon and the Darkover series. She was noted for the female perspective in her writing, something before little-seen in sword and sorcery fantasy.

Bradley began writing at the age of 17 and later graduated with a Bachelor of Arts degree from Hardin-Simmons University. She co-founded the Society for Creative Anachronism in 1966. She also served as the editor of the long-running Sword and Sorceress anthology series. She was posthumously awarded the World Fantasy Award for lifetime achievement in 2000.

Though Bradley remained popular during her lifetime, her reputation was posthumously marred when in 2014 her daughter reported that Bradley had sexually abused her, and allegedly assisted her second husband, convicted child abuser Walter Breen, in his own grooming and sexual abuse of multiple unrelated children. Many science fiction authors have since publicly condemned Bradley.

== Personal life ==
Born Marion Eleanor Zimmer on June 3, 1930, she lived on a farm in Albany, New York, and began writing at the age of 17. She was married to Robert Alden Bradley from October 26, 1949, until their divorce on May 19, 1964. They had a son, David Robert Bradley (1950–2008). During the 1950s she was introduced to lesbian advocacy organization the Daughters of Bilitis.

After her divorce, Bradley married numismatist Walter Breen on June 3, 1964. They had a daughter, Moira Greyland, who is a professional harpist and singer, and a son, Mark Greyland. Moira's son, RJ Stern, is a college football player who was featured on season 5 of Last Chance U on Netflix.

In 1965, Bradley graduated with a Bachelor of Arts degree from Hardin-Simmons University in Abilene, Texas. Afterward, she moved to Berkeley, California, to pursue graduate studies at the University of California, Berkeley, between 1965 and 1967. In 1966, with her brother Paul Edwin Zimmer, she helped found and name the Society for Creative Anachronism and was involved in developing several local groups, some in New York after her move to Staten Island. In particular, she and Breen founded and served as the first directors for the Kingdom of the East.

Bradley and Breen separated in 1979 but remained married. They also continued a business relationship and lived on the same street for over a decade. They officially divorced on May 9, 1990, the year Breen was arrested on child molestation charges after a 13-year-old boy reported that Breen had been molesting him for four years. She had edited Breen's book Greek Love (published pseudonymously), which was dedicated to her (named simply as "[his] wife"), and in 1965 had contributed an article, "Feminine Equivalents of Greek Love in Modern Literature", to Breen's journal The International Journal of Greek Love. She allegedly was told of Breen's abuse of a minor by her secretary; the secretary has said "she was extremely upset" and immediately divorced him. However, Bradley's daughter Moira has alleged that Bradley knew of Breen's abuse for many years prior to being 'informed' by her secretary, but never attempted to call the police or otherwise protect Breen's victims.

== Literary career ==
=== Early work ===
Bradley stated that when she was a child she enjoyed reading adventure fantasy authors such as Henry Kuttner, Edmond Hamilton, C. L. Moore, and Leigh Brackett, especially when they wrote about "the glint of strange suns on worlds that never were and never would be". Her first novel and much of her subsequent work show their influence strongly. At 17, she began her first novel The Forest House, her retelling of Norma; she finished it before her death.

In 1949 Bradley made her first sale as an adjunct to an amateur fiction contest in Amazing Stories with the short story "Outpost". "Outpost" was published in Amazing Stories Vol. 23, No. 12, the December 1949 issue; it had previously appeared in the fanzine Spacewarp Vol. 4, No. 3, in December 1948. Her first professional publication was a short story "Women Only", which appeared in the second (and final) issue of Vortex Science Fiction in 1953. Her first published novel-length work was Falcons of Narabedla, first published in the May 1957 issue of Other Worlds.

=== Gay and lesbian pulp fiction ===
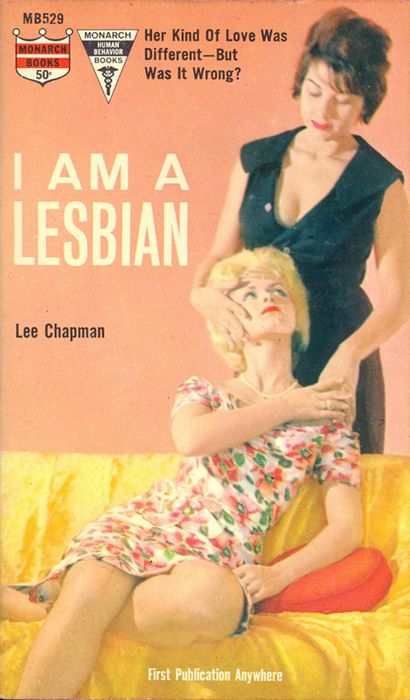
Cover of I Am a Lesbian published by Bradley under the pseudonym Lee Chapman. Monarch Book, 1962.

Early in her career, writing as Morgan Ives, Miriam Gardner, John Dexter, and Lee Chapman, Bradley produced several works outside the speculative fiction genre, including gay and lesbian pulp fiction novels; I Am a Lesbian was published in 1962. Though relatively tame by today's standards, her novels were considered pornographic when published.

=== Darkover ===
Bradley's 1958 novel The Planet Savers introduced the planet of Darkover, which became the setting of a popular series by Bradley and other authors. The Darkover milieu is a science fantasy fictional world, with science fiction as well as fantasy overtones: Darkover is a lost human colony where psi powers developed to an unusual degree, and work like magic, while technology has regressed to a more-or-less medieval stage. Bradley wrote many Darkover novels by herself, but in her later years collaborated with other authors for publication; her literary collaborators have continued the series since her death.

=== Encouraging fan interaction ===
Bradley took an active role in science fiction and fantasy fandom, promoting interaction with professional authors and publishers and making several important contributions to the subculture. In her teens she wrote letters to the pulp magazines of the time, such as the above-mentioned Amazing Stories and Thrilling Wonder Stories. Starting in the late 1940s and continuing in the 1950s and 1960s, she published her own fanzines, including Astra's Tower, Day*Star, and Anything Box. She also co-edited fanzines, including Ugly Bird with Redd Boggs and MEZRAB with her first husband Robert Bradley. Bradley contributed to several other fanzines, including The Gorgon and The Nekromantikon.

For many years, Bradley encouraged Darkover fan fiction. She invited submissions from unpublished authors and reprinted some fan fiction in commercial Darkover anthologies. This ended after a dispute with a fan when Bradley wanted to use some parts of the fan's story she had read in a Darkover novel she was working in 1992. As a result, the novel remained unpublished and Bradley demanded the cessation of all Darkover fan fiction.

=== Tolkien fandom ===
In the 1970s, as part of the contemporary wave of enthusiasm for J. R. R. Tolkien's fictional world of Middle-earth, Bradley wrote an essay about Éowyn's supposed love for the hero Aragorn called "Of Men, Halflings, and Hero Worship" for the Astra's Tower fanzine. She also penned two short fanfic stories about Arwen, publishing them in chapbook format. One story, "The Jewel of Arwen" (originally published in a different form in the fanzine I Palantir #2, August 1961), appeared in her professional anthology The Best of Marion Zimmer Bradley (1985), but was dropped from later reprints. She continued to contribute to different science fiction and fantasy fanzines and magazines throughout her career.

=== Other work ===
In 1966, Bradley became a co-founder of the Society for Creative Anachronism and is credited with coining the name of that group.

Bradley was the editor of the long-running Sword and Sorceress anthology series, which encouraged submissions of fantasy stories featuring original and non-traditional heroines from young and upcoming authors. Although she particularly encouraged young female authors, she was not averse to including stories from men in her anthologies. Mercedes Lackey was one of many authors who first appeared in the anthologies. Bradley also maintained a large family of writers at her home in Berkeley, California. Following Bradley's death, the anthology was edited by Elizabeth Waters and continued until 2019.

Her most famous single novel may be The Mists of Avalon, a retelling of the Camelot legend from the point of view of Morgaine and Gwenhwyfar. It grew into a series of books and, like the Darkover series, the later novels are written with or by other authors and have continued to appear since Bradley's death.

Bradley was posthumously awarded the World Fantasy Award for lifetime achievement in 2000.

== Child sex abuse allegations ==
In 2000, shortly after Bradley's death, author Stephen Goldin, the stepfather of a boy who had been molested by Walter Breen, started a website claiming that Bradley had been fully aware of her husband's crimes and made no effort to report them or protect his victims. However, Elizabeth Waters, Bradley's secretary, claimed that she was the first one who told Bradley and that Bradley "was extremely upset" at the news.

In 2014, Moira Greyland, the daughter of Bradley and Breen, accused Bradley of sexual abuse from the ages of 3 to 12. In an email to The Guardian, Greyland said that she had not spoken out before because "I thought that my mother's fans would be angry with me for saying anything against someone who had championed women's rights and made so many of them feel differently about themselves and their lives. I didn't want to hurt anyone she had helped, so I just kept my mouth shut".

Greyland also confirmed Goldin's statements by saying that Bradley was aware of her husband's behavior and chose not to report him. Greyland reported that she was not the only victim of Bradley's, and also that she was one of the people who reported her father for child molestation, for which he received multiple convictions.

In December 2017, Bradley's daughter published a detailed biography of her mother, including her pedophilia and sexual abuse, in a book entitled The Last Closet: The Dark Side of Avalon.

Additionally, according to Greyland, Bradley assisted Breen (her husband at the time) in accessing and abusing multiple unrelated young boys, knowing he was a pedophile who was engaging in sexual contact with children as young as eight. Greyland states that Bradley and her live-in female partner (whom Greyland refers to as her step-mother) both admitted to knowledge of the abuse and purposefully avoided investigating, questioning, or notifying any authorities. Bradley was also accused of attempting to adopt a child whom Breen was interested in sexually.

In a 2014 interview, her brother Mark also confirmed the allegations, having himself been a victim of sexual abuse.

In response to these allegations, on July 2, 2014, Victor Gollancz Ltd, the publisher of Bradley's digital backlist, began donating all income from the sales of Bradley's e-books to the charity Save the Children. Janni Lee Simner donated advances and royalties from her two Darkover short stories and, at the request of her husband, Larry Hammer, payment for his sale to Bradley's magazine, to the American anti-sexual assault organization Rape, Abuse & Incest National Network.

A number of science fiction authors have publicly condemned Bradley. Among the first was John Scalzi, who expressed his horror within a day of the allegations being made public. Hugo Award winner Jim C. Hines wrote that Bradley's positive effect on her readers and fellow authors "makes the revelations about Marion Zimmer Bradley protecting a known child rapist and molesting her own daughter and others even more tragic." G Willow Wilson, who, along with Bradley, is a fellow World Fantasy Award winner, said she was "speechless". Diana L. Paxson, who collaborated with Bradley on a number of novels and who continued to write novels set in the Avalon Series after Bradley's death, said that she was "shocked and appalled to read Moira Greyland's posts about her mother ... I never personally observed, nor had any reason to suspect, that (Bradley) was abusing either of her children."

== Religion ==
While she was attending the College for Teachers (now University at Albany, SUNY) in Albany, Bradley became involved in Western esoteric tradition. She later completed a Rosicrucian correspondence course.

In the late 1950s or early 1960s, Bradley and Walter Breen founded the Aquarian Order of the Restoration based on the work of Dion Fortune. By 1961 she was formally initiating others, including Ramfis S. Firethorn.

Bradley was active in Darkmoon Circle, which was founded in 1978 by several women who were members of her Aquarian Order of the Restoration. Bradley renovated her garage to provide a meeting room for Darkmoon Circle as well as for other local Pagan groups. In 1981 Bradley, Diana L. Paxson, and Elisabeth Waters incorporated the Center for Non-Traditional Religion.

In the 1990s Bradley said she would return to Christianity, telling an interviewer: "I just go regularly to the Episcopalian church ... That pagan thing ... I feel that I've gotten past it. I would like people to explore the possibilities."

== Death ==
After suffering declining health for years, Bradley died at Alta Bates Medical Center in Berkeley on September 25, 1999, four days after suffering a heart attack. Her ashes were later scattered at Glastonbury Tor in Somerset, England.

== Works ==
=== Novels ===
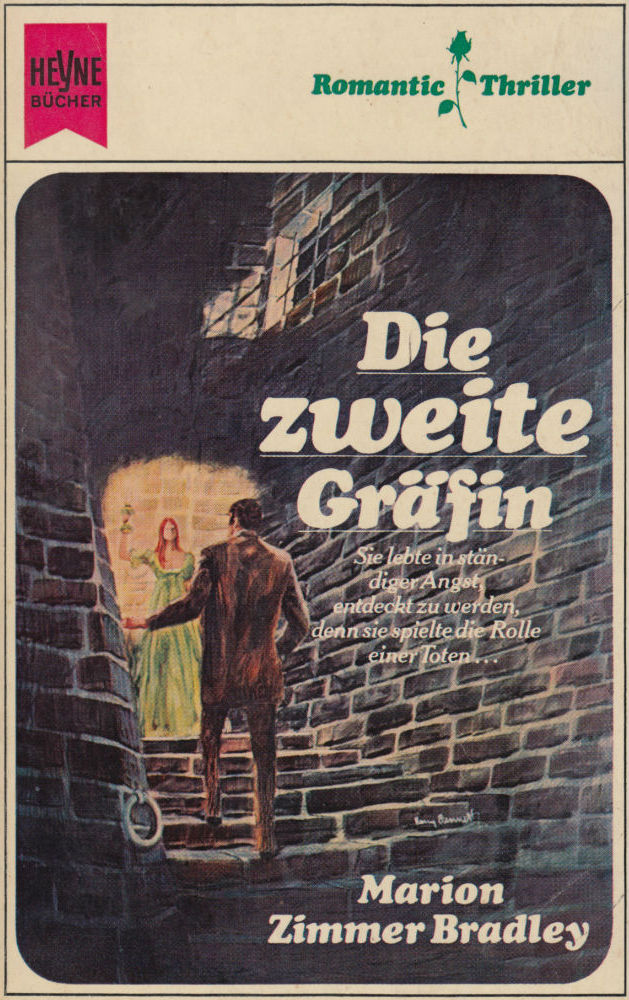
1970 German translation of Souvenir of Monique

- Falcons of Narabedla (1957)
- The Door Through Space (1961)
- Seven from the Stars (1962)
- The Colors of Space (1963)
- Castle Terror (1965)
- Souvenir of Monique (1967)
- Bluebeard's Daughter (1968)
- The Brass Dragon (1970)
- In the Steps of the Master – The Sixth Sense #2 (1973) (based on the television series The Sixth Sense, created by Anthony Lawrence)
- Hunters of the Red Moon (1973) (novelette)
- The Jewel of Arwen (1974) (novelette)
- The Parting of Arwen (1974) (novelette)
- Can Ellen Be Saved? (1975) (adaptation of a teleplay by Emmett Roberts)
- The Endless Voyage (1975)
- Drums of Darkness (1976)
- The Ruins of Isis (1978)
- The Catch Trap (1979)
- The Endless Universe (1979) (rewrite of The Endless Voyage)
- The House Between the Worlds (1980)
- Survey Ship (1980)
- The Colors of Space (1983) (unabridged edition)
- Night's Daughter (1985)
- Warrior Woman (1985)
- The Firebrand (1987)
- Black Trillium (1990) (with Julian May and Andre Norton)
- Lady of the Trillium (1995) (with Elisabeth Waters, initially uncredited)
- Tiger Burning Bright (1995) (with Mercedes Lackey and Andre Norton)
- The Gratitude of Kings (1997) (with Elisabeth Waters)

=== Short story collections ===
- The Dark Intruder and Other Stories (1964)
- The Best of Marion Zimmer Bradley (1985)
- Jamie and Other Stories (1988)
- Marion Zimmer Bradley's Darkover (Darkover collection) (1993)

=== Series ===
==== Atlantean series ====
- Web of Light (1983)
- Web of Darkness (1983)
- The Fall of Atlantis (1987) (omnibus edition of Web of Light and Web of Darkness)

==== Avalon series ====
- The Mists of Avalon (1983) (illustrated by Braldt Bralds)
- The Forest House (1993) (with Diana L. Paxson)
- Lady of Avalon (1997) (with Diana L. Paxson)
- Priestess of Avalon (2000) (with Diana L. Paxson)
- Ancestors of Avalon (2004) (written by Diana L. Paxson)
- Ravens of Avalon (2007) (written by Diana L. Paxson)
- Sword of Avalon (2009) (written by Diana L. Paxson)

==== Colin MacLaren series ====
- The Inheritor (1984)
- Dark Satanic (1988) (published originally already in 1972 by Berkley Publishing Corporation, NY)
- Witch Hill (1990) (published possibly already in 1972 by Greenleaf under the pseudonym Valerie Graves)
- Heartlight (1998)

==== Shadow's Gate series ====
(co-written by Rosemary Edghill (uncredited))

- Ghostlight (1995)
- Witchlight (1996)
- Gravelight (1997)
- Heartlight (1998)

==== Darkover series ====
- The Planet Savers (1958)
- The Sword of Aldones (1962, shortlisted for the 1963 Hugo Award for Best Novel)
- The Bloody Sun (1964)
- Star of Danger (1965)
- The Winds of Darkover (1970)
- The World Wreckers (1971)
- Darkover Landfall (1972)
- The Spell Sword (1974) (with her brother Paul Edwin Zimmer, uncredited)
- The Heritage of Hastur (1975)
- The Shattered Chain (1976)
- The Forbidden Tower (1977, shortlisted for the 1978 Hugo Award for Best Novel)
- Stormqueen! (1978)
- The Bloody Sun (1979) rewritten and expanded edition
- Two To Conquer (1980)
- Sharra's Exile (1981)
- Hawkmistress! (1982)
- Thendara House (1983) (with Jacqueline Lichtenberg, uncredited)
- City of Sorcery (1984)
- The Heirs of Hammerfell (1989)
- Rediscovery (1993) (with Mercedes Lackey)
- Exile's Song (1996) (with Adrienne Martine-Barnes)
- The Shadow Matrix (1997) (with Adrienne Martine-Barnes)
- Traitor's Sun (1999) (with Adrienne Martine-Barnes)
- Hastur Lord (2010) (with Deborah J. Ross)
- Thunderlord! (2016) (with Deborah J. Ross, sequel to Stormqueen!)
- Arilinn (2024) (with Deborah J. Ross)

===== The Clingfire trilogy =====
- The Fall of Neskaya (2001) (with Deborah J. Ross)
- Zandru's Forge (2003) (with Deborah J. Ross)
- A Flame in Hali (2004) (with Deborah J. Ross)

===== Modern Darkover =====
- The Alton Gift (2007) (with Deborah J. Ross)
- The Children of Kings (2013) (with Deborah J. Ross)
- The Laran Gambit (2022) (with Deborah J. Ross)

==== Glenraven series ====
(with Holly Lisle)

- Glenraven (1996)
- In the Rift (1998)

==== Survivors series ====
(with her brother Paul Edwin Zimmer)

- Hunters of the Red Moon (1973)
- The Survivors (1979)

==== Omnibus editions ====
- The Children of Hastur (omnibus edition of The Heritage of Hastur and Sharra's Exile) (1982)
- The Oath of Renuciates (omnibus edition of The Shattered Chain and Thendara House) (1984)
- The Darkover Saga (a slipcase set containing Hawkmistress, Sharra's Exile; The Shattered Chain; Stormqueen!; Sword of Chaos) (1984)
- The Ages of Chaos (omnibus edition of Stormqueen! and Hawkmistress!) (2002)
- The Forbidden Circle (omnibus edition of The Spell Sword and The Forbidden Tower) (2002)
- Heritage And Exile (omnibus edition of The Heritage of Hastur and Sharra's Exile) (2002)
- The Saga of the Renunciates (omnibus edition of The Shattered Chain, Thendara House and City of Sorcery) (2002)
- A World Divided (omnibus edition of Star of Danger, Winds of Darkover and The Bloody Sun) (2003)
- First Contact (omnibus edition of Darkover Landfall and Two to Conquer) (2004)
- To Save a World (omnibus edition of The Planet Savers and World Wreckers) (2004)

=== Anthologies ===
- The Best of Marion Zimmer Bradley's Fantasy Magazine (1994)
- The Best of Marion Zimmer Bradley's Fantasy Magazine – Vol. II (1995) (with Elisabeth Waters)

==== Darkover anthologies ====
(edited by Marion Zimmer Bradley, with some short stories by her, but mostly by other writers)

- The Keeper's Price (1980)
- Sword of Chaos (1982)
- Free Amazons of Darkover (1985)
- The Other Side of the Mirror (1987)
- Red Sun of Darkover (1987)
- Four Moons of Darkover (1988)
- Domains of Darkover (1990)
- Renunciates of Darkover (1991)
- Leroni of Darkover (1991)
- Towers of Darkover (1993)
- Snows of Darkover (1994)

==== Other anthologies ====
- Greyhaven (1983) (with her brother Paul Edwin Zimmer)
- Lythande (1986) (with Vonda N. McIntyre)
- Marion Zimmer Bradley's Fantasy Magazine (1988–2000)
- Marion Zimmer Bradley's Fantasy Worlds (1998)
- Spells of Wonder (1989)
- Sword and Sorceress series (1984–2013) (edited by Marion Zimmer Bradley, after her death by Elisabeth Waters and Diana L. Paxson)

=== Novels under pen names ===
- Writing under the pseudonym Lee Chapman
  - I Am a Lesbian (1962)
- Writing under the pseudonym John Dexter
  - No Adam for Eve (1966)
- Writing under the pseudonym Miriam Gardner
  - My Sister, My Love (1963)
  - Twilight Lovers (1964)
  - The Strange Women (1967)
- Writing under the pseudonym Morgan Ives
  - Spare Her Heaven (1963)
  - Anything Goes (1964)
  - Knives of Desire (1966)

=== Poems ===
- The Maenads (1978)

=== Music ===
- Songs from Rivendell (a.k.a. The Rivendell Suite): music and arrangements for several poems from the novels The Hobbit and The Lord of the Rings by J.R.R. Tolkien (1960) – included with other Tolkien songs on the CD "The Starlit Jewel" by the Celtic and Early Music Ensemble Brocelïande.
- Songs of Darkover by Margaret Davis and Kristoph Klover from Brocelïande accompanied by the filk musicians Cynthia McQuillin and Jane Robinson is derived from the audiobook version of Music of Darkover and features two songs composed by MZB: "The Ballad of Hastur and Cassilda" and "The Outlaw"

=== Editorial positions ===
- The Darkover Newsletter (1975 to 1993)
- Starstone, a Darkover fanzine (5 issues 1978–1982)
- Marion Zimmer Bradley's Fantasy Magazine (50 issues 1988 – 2000)

=== Scholarly work ===
- Bradley, Marion Zimmer. "Feminine equivalents of Greek Love in modern fiction". International Journal of Greek Love, Vol. 1, No. 1. (1965). Pages 48–58.
- Checklist: A complete, cumulative checklist of lesbian, variant, and homosexual fiction in English (1960) and addenda (1961, 1962, 1963).
- A Gay Bibliography (1975).
- The Necessity for Beauty: Robert W. Chambers & the Romantic Tradition (1974)

=== Other works ===
Bradley created several different fanzines, including The Anything Box (2 issues, 1959), Astra's Tower (5 issues, 1947–50), Astra's Tower, Special Leaflet (5 issues, 1952–62), Day*Star (28 issues, 1954–72), Fantasy Ambler (1 issue, 1962), Gemini, Jr. (1 issue, 1951), Gemini FAPA (3 issues, 1951–60), On the Ragged Edge (1 issue, undated), and Catch Trap (at least issues 89–106, early 1960s). She co-edited several other fanzines, including Allerlei (at least 17 issues, 1960–65, with Walter Breen), Anduril (1 issue, 1962, with David Bradley and Paul Zimmer), MEZRAB (7 issues, 1950–52, with Robert A. Bradley), and Ugly Bird (2 issues, 1956–59, with Redd Boggs).

She also contributed to The Ladder and The Mattachine Review. As Elfrieda or Elfrida Rivers, she contributed at least to the underground newspaper The East Village Other, the neo-Pagan periodical Green Egg and also Sybil Leek's Astrology Journal, where she wrote horoscopes and book reviews and had her own column as well as occasionally worked as editors with her husband Walter Breen.

== Pseudonyms ==
- Lee Chapman
- John Dexter
- Miriam Gardner
- Valerie Graves
- Morgan Ives
- Elfrieda Rivers (also Alfrida Rivers and Elfrida Rivers)
- Astara Zimmer (also Astra Zimmer and Astra Zimmer Bradley)
- John Jay Wells (with Juanita Coulson)
