= Deborah J. Ross =

American writer

- Ross at the World Fantasy Convention 2026
- Born: Deborah Jean Ross; April 1947 (age 79)
- Education: Portland State University
- Occupation: Author
- Known for: Fantasy and science fiction, collaboration with Marion Zimmer Bradley

Deborah Jean Ross (also known as Deborah Wheeler; born April 1947), is an American science fiction and fantasy author.

== Biography ==
Deborah Jean Ross was born in April 1947 and grew up in California. She attended Portland State University, graduating in 1973.

Around this time, she became friends with Marion Zimmer Bradley. When Bradley was asked to edit the first Sword and Sorceress, Ross submitted a short story for the anthology, "Imperatrix" (1984). "Imperatrix" became her first published short story, under her married name of Deborah Wheeler. She continued to write for years, producing a number of short stories and two novels, Jaydium and Northlight, through DAW books.

Before Bradley's death in 1999, Ross was invited to work on a project with her set in Darkover.

Eventually, Ross returned to her maiden name, Deborah J. Ross.

== Bibliography ==
=== Novels as Deborah Wheeler ===
- Jaydium (1993), DAW Books, ISBN 0-88677-556-6 (out of print)
- Northlight (1995), DAW Books, ISBN 0-88677-639-2 (out of print)
- Collaborators (2013), Dragon Moon Press, ISBN 9781897492635

=== Darkover ===
Ross worked with Marion Zimmer Bradley on several books in the Darkover series.

- The Clingfire Trilogy:
  - The Fall of Neskaya (2001), DAW Books, hardback: ISBN 0-7564-0034-1 paperback: ISBN 0-7564-0053-8
  - Zandru's Forge (2003), DAW Books, hardback: ISBN 0-7564-0149-6 paperback: ISBN 0-7564-0184-4
  - A Flame in Hali (2004), DAW Books, hardback: ISBN 0-7564-0218-2 paperback: ISBN 0-7564-0267-0
- The Modern Darkover series, which is a continuation of Zimmer Bradley's novel Traitor's Sun.
  - The Alton Gift (2007), DAW Books, hardback: ISBN 0-7564-0019-8 paperback: ISBN 978-0-7564-0480-2
  - The Children of Kings (2013), hardback: ISBN 9780756407971
  - The Laran Gambit (2022), hardback: ISBN 9781938185724
- Hastur Lord (2010), DAW Books, hardback: ISBN 978-0-7564-0622-6
- Thunderlord! (2016)

=== The Seven-Petaled Shield ===
An original fantasy series, intended to be a trilogy

- The Seven-Petaled Shield (2013), DAW Books, ISBN 978-0756406219
- Shannivar: Volume Two of The Seven-Petaled Shield (2013), DAW Books, ISBN 978-0756409203
- The Heir of Khored: Book Three of The Seven-Petaled Shield (2014), DAW Books, ISBN 978-0756409210

=== Darkover anthologies ===
The publication of the anthologies of Darkover restarted in 2013.

- Music of Darkover (with Elisabeth Waters) (2013)
- Stars of Darkover (2014)
- Gifts of Darkover (2015)
- Realms of Darkover (2016)
- Masques of Darkover (2017)
- Crossroads of Darkover (2018)
- Citadels of Darkover (2019)
- Jewels of Darkover (2023)

A collection of Ross stories.

- A Heat Wave in the Hellers: and Other Tales of Darkover (2019)

=== Anthologies ===
- Lace and Blade (2008), Norilana Books.
- Lace and Blade 2 (2009), Norilana Books.
- Lace and Blade 4 (2018)
- Lace and Blade 5 (2019)
