= The Winds of Darkover =

1970 science fantasy novel by Marion Zimmer Bradley

- Cover of the first edition
- Author: Marion Zimmer Bradley
- Cover artist: Frank Kelly Freas
- Language: English
- Series: Darkover
- Genre: Science fantasy
- Publisher: Ace Books
- Publication date: 1970
- Publication place: United States
- Media type: Print (paperback)
- Pages: 139
- OCLC: 9263732
- Preceded by: Star of Danger
- Followed by: The Bloody Sun

The Winds of Darkover is a science fantasy novel by American writer Marion Zimmer Bradley, part of her Darkover series. It was first published by Ace Books in 1970, as an Ace Double bound tête-bêche with The Anything Tree by John Rackham.

This is the first Darkover novel to include references to the Sharra Matrix. In terms of the Darkover timeline, Bradley states in "Author's Notes on Chronology" that The Winds of Darkover occurs about four years after the events in Star of Danger.

One of the underlying themes of The Winds of Darkover is rape. Bradley provides her readers with parallel experiences – the rape of Allira Storn by the bandit Brynat, and the psychic rape of Dan Barron by Loran Storn. Both Allira and Dan are overcome by force and their bodies made to do things they would not have done by choice. In both cases, the perpetrators justify their actions on the basis of need – Brynat needs to marry Allira to legitimize his sack of Storn, and Loran Storn needs to protect Storn Castle. The reader is left to consider the consequences.

== Plot summary ==
Dan Barron, a Terran spaceport technician, has begun having visions that interfere with his work. After he causes a major accident, Barron is reassigned to a minor diplomatic mission to teach lens grinding to the locals. His guide is Lerrys Montray, who unbeknownst to Barron, is half Terran.

In the Hellers Mountains, the isolated Storn family estate of High Windward has come under attack from a bandit colorfully named Brynat Scarface. He has forced one of the Storn daughters to marry him, but is unable to take full control of the castle because the Lord of Storn lies in a trance behind a telepathic force field.

Storn has made telepathic contact with both Barron, causing his visions, and his sister Melitta, and instructs them both to rendezvous at the ancient city of Carthon. While escaping the castle, Melitta calls on the assistance of Sharra, the mythical chained goddess of forges and fires.

Barron, Lerrys, and their party make their way to one of the mountain fire stations. On the trail, Barron also has a vision of Sharra. Now merged with Storn, he recognizes the beginnings of a Ghost Wind, which disorients all who come in contact. The party takes shelter, but Barron uses the opportunity to escape to Carthon.

Barron and Melitta meet, and Melitta realizes that her brother has taken over Barron's mind. They make their way to Aldaran to request assistance. They are welcomed by Desideria Leynier, and later meet with Kermiac Aldaran. Aldaran refuses to support their cause, but Desideria suggests she can use the Sharra Matrix on their behalf. Barron is accidentally exposed to a telepathic damper, separating him from Storn.

Desideria, Barron and Melitta return to the Storn lands. With the assistance of the mysterious Forge Folk, Desideria uses Sharra to destroy the bandits. Barron decides to remain with Melitta.

== Major characters ==
- Daniel Firth Barron, Terran spaceport technician
- Brynat Scarface, a Dry Town bandit
- Loran Rakhal Storn, Storn of Storn, a blind teenaged boy
- Melitta and Allira Storn, his sisters
- Larry/Lerrys Montray, son of Wade Montray, foster son of Valdir Alton
- Desideria Leynier, a keeper. She will eventually marry Loran Storn, though after the end of this book, in the next book The World Wreckers.
- Kermiac Aldaran

== Sources ==
- Breen, Walter (1979). The Darkover Concordance; A Reader's Guide. Berkeley, CA: Pennyfarthing Press. pp. 152–153. ISBN 0-930800-07-9.
- Timeline for Darkover history, http://www.darkover.com/new/darkover/encyclopedia/history/timeline.en.html
