= The World Wreckers =

1971 novel by Marion Zimmer Bradley

- Cover of the first edition
- Author: Marion Zimmer Bradley
- Cover artist: Frank Kelly Freas
- Language: English
- Series: Darkover
- Genre: Science fiction
- Publisher: Ace Books
- Publication date: 1971
- Publication place: United States
- Media type: Print (paperback)
- Pages: 189
- OCLC: 17399780
- Preceded by: The Sword of Aldones/Sharra's Exile
- Followed by: Hastur Lord

The World Wreckers is a science fantasy novel by American writer Marion Zimmer Bradley, part of her Darkover series. First published by Ace Books in 1971, it features a complex sub-plot involving the sexual interactions between hermaphrodite native species, known as the chieri, and humans.

The book contains pivotal events in the part of the series that Zimmer Bradley identified as "After the Comyn/Against the Terrans". Every book that follows chronologically, refers to The World Wreckers.

In "Author's Notes on Chronology", Bradley implies that The World Wreckers occurs about eighty years after the events in The Winds of Darkover, basing this assertion on the age of Desideria Storn in the two books, although according to the narrative of The World Wreckers, Desideria is about 92 Terran years old and as Darkovan year is about 1¼ Terran years, she is about 74 Darkovan years old. This would mean that The Winds of Darkover took place about 58 years prior to The World Wreckers. Also, the story takes place two or three years after the events in The Sword of Aldones/Sharra's Exile.

== Plot summary ==
The mysterious Andrea Closson accepts a contract to wreck the economy of Darkover, so that the planet must turn to the Terran Empire for assistance. Closson's thoughts reveal that she is a native of Darkover, a child of the Yellow Forest.

Regis Hastur survives another assassination attempt. He and his paxman, Danilo Syrtis, discuss the many mysterious deaths besieging the Comyn. Regis recalls that his two sons are among the deceased, and that many of the old Comyn families have died out altogether. He asks the Terrans to seek out telepaths on other worlds and send them to Darkover, for what becomes known as Project Telepath.

At Arillinn, Regis meets Linnea Storn, a matrix technician. He learns that her grandmother was Desideria Leynier-Storn, the leronis who raised Sharra to restore High Windward to its rightful family (as seen in The Winds of Darkover).

Citizens from all over Darkover apply to Regis for assistance, describing economic problems, crop failures, and fires. A member of the ancient Darkovan chieri race arrives and asks to speak to Regis. He volunteers to assist in Project Telepath.

The members of Project Telepath meet and evaluate each other. A number of tests are run. Missy proves to be a troublemaker. They discover that Keral is a hermaphrodite. Further tests prove that Missy, whom they originally believed to be human, is also a chieri. As events unfold, it will become clear that chieri can be either sex, and can change gender at will.

Two free Amazon guides arrive at Arillinn and ask to see the Keeper, Linnea Storn. They describe a recent client, Andrea Closson, whom they guided through the back country. They suspect that she has something to do with the ecological disaster that seems to have befallen Darkover. Linnea contacts Regis with this information.

Regis calls for all of the telepaths on Darkover to join him to combat the threat. During a festival dance, their minds join in ecstasy and call into the castle the form of Andrea Closson, whom one of the chieri identifies as a lost member of his people. Accepted back to her own people, Closson uses her own fortune to restore Darkover's ecology. She is able to find hope in her people's survival in Keral's child with Project Telepath member David Hamilton, a union such as resulted in the strain of the Comyn.

Regis creates a Telepathic Council dedicated to working in limited cooperation with the Terran Empire.

== Major characters ==
- Andrea Closson, head of the corporation informally known as the World Wreckers, a chieri
- Regis Hastur, heir to the domain of Hastur
- Danilo Syrtis-Ardais, his paxman and lover
- Linnea Storn of High Windward, Keeper of Arillinn, future wife of Regis Hastur

== Project Telepath characters ==
- Dr. Jason Allison, a human who has lived a significant part of his youth with the Trailmen
- Dr. David Hamilton, a surgeon
- Missy Gentry, a chieri
- Keral, a chieri
- Desideria Leynier-Storn, an elderly Comyn leronis

== Inconsistencies with later books in the series ==
Regis calls a representative of the Pan-Darkovan League "monsieur". There is no other book in which French phrases are used as part of the Darkovan language.

== Sources ==
- The World Wreckers title listing at the Internet Speculative Fiction Database
- Breen, Walter (1979). The Darkover Concordance; A Reader's Guide. Berkeley, CA: Pennyfarthing Press. pp. 152–153. ISBN 978-0-930800-07-9.
- Brown, Charles N.; William G. Contento (November 20, 2007). "The Locus Index to Science Fiction (1984-1998)".
