= Gryphon Publications =

- Status: Active
- Founder: Gary Lovisi
- Country of origin: United States
- Headquarters location: Brooklyn, New York
- Publication types: Books, magazines
- Fiction genres: Pulp fiction, science fiction
- Official website: www.GryphonBooks.com

Gryphon Publications, or Gryphon Books, is an American independent publishing company specializing in contemporary pulp stories. Owned and operated by Gary Lovisi, the company publishes Lovisi's own writing as well as that of other authors.

== Magazines ==
In addition to books, the company publishes the quarterly Hardboiled Magazine, as well as selected reprints in Gryphon Doubles.

Gryphon published Other Worlds magazine, edited by Lovisi, between 1988 and 1996. The editorial criteria were for "short, hard SF shockers, with impact" up to 3000 words.
