= Hastur Lord =

1996 novel by Deborah J. Ross and Marion Zimmer Bradley

- First edition
- Author: Deborah J. Ross and Marion Zimmer Bradley
- Cover artist: Shutterstock
- Language: English
- Series: Darkover
- Genre: Science fantasy
- Publisher: DAW Books
- Publication date: January 2010
- Publication place: United States
- Media type: Print (hardcover)
- Pages: 421
- Preceded by: The World Wreckers
- Followed by: Exile's Song

Hastur Lord is a science fantasy novel by American writers Deborah J. Ross and Marion Zimmer Bradley in the Darkover series. It was first published by in hardcover by DAW Books in 1996. The book falls in the part of the Darkover timeline that the author called "Against the Terrans: The Second Age (after the Comyn)".

Hastur Lord is an allegory, illustrating the consequences to a religiously pluralistic planet, when a small group of monotheistic fundamentalists tries to impose their will on a larger society that doesn't share their views.

In terms of Darkover's timeline, the book takes place after The World Wreckers and before the Exile's Song, about ten years.

== Plot summary ==
=== Book One: Regis ===
Dan Lawton, the Terran Legate, sends word to Regis Hastur of a medical emergency in the Terran zone. Regis discovers that Dan's son, Felix, is experiencing symptoms of Threshold Sickness. Dan's wife, Tiphani, is hysterical, regarding Threshold Sickness as a symptom of moral degeneracy, rather than simply an illness experienced by telepaths. Regis learns that Tiphani has taken a keyed starstone away from her son, fearing that it is a pagan object. Regis returns the stone to Felix.

Regis asks Linnea Storn, the mother of his only child, to come to Thendara and attend to Felix. Regis also asks her to be his wife, saying she is the only woman he could possibly marry. Linnea, knowing that Regis is romantically committed to Danilo, refuses.

Danvan Hastur, the elderly Regent of Darkover, dies. On his deathbed, he tells Regis that he has a brother, whose rights in the Comyn must be ensured.

=== Book Two: Rinaldo ===
Regis learns that his brother, Rinaldo, has for many years been a cristoforo brother in the monastery of St. Valentine of the Snows at Nevarsin. Rinaldo tells Regis he is emmasca, and this is why their grandfather never had him legitimated. On the journey to Thendara, Rinaldo displays a tendency to lecture and scold, that both Regis and Danilo find disturbing.

Rinaldo meets Tiphani Lawton, and finds a kindred spirit in the overwrought Terran woman. They determine to build the Chapel of All Worlds to teach a syncretistic version of their similar theological views.

Danilo Syrtis-Ardais and Mikhail Lanart-Hastur are kidnapped from Comyn Castle by Valdir Ridenow. Ridenow demands that Regis abdicate in favor of Rinaldo. Threatened with Danilo's death by torture, Regis agrees.

Rinaldo demands that Regis give up all contact with Danilo, on the grounds that their relationship is sinful. He also demands that Regis take a wife. Linnea Storn-Lanart agrees to the marriage, both because she truly loves Regis and because she knows lives are at stake.

=== Book Three: Danilo ===
Danilo learns that he is now Rinaldo's paxman, against his will. He is ordered to escort Rinaldo's intended bride, Bettany Ridenow, from Serrais. Bettany and Rinaldo are married a week later in a cristoforo rite. At the reception, Danilo observes Rinaldo's unusually close relationship to Tiphani Lawton. Linnea manages a short, reassuring conversation with Danilo, and then goes into labor.

Despite threats of open warfare by Valdir Ridenow, Rinaldo thinks it is more important to impose the cristoforo religion on all of Darkover.

Bettany announces that she is pregnant. Tiphani tells Danilo that she has abandoned her husband and now goes by the name Tiphani Luminosa. She is clearly mad.

=== Book Four: Regis ===
Regis learns that Rinaldo has ordered the kidnapping of young Comyn children. They have been sequestered in a school whose purpose is to brainwash them with Rinaldo and Tiphani's version of cristoforo doctrine.

Regis confronts Rinaldo about the kidnapped children. Rinaldo agrees to release them, but Regis doubts his sincerity. He searches the Old Town, and, seeing Tiphani, follows her. He discovers the missing children in an upstairs dormitory, and while attempting rescue, encounters a spaceforce detachment sent by Lawton to recover his son, Felix.

During a confrontation between Comyn factions, Rinaldo's behavior becomes increasingly disordered. Regis restores paxman status to Danilo, and summons his brother to answer charges in the Crystal Chamber.

Several days later, in the presence of many of the Comyn, Regis declares his brother unfit to rule. As Rinaldo waivers, Tiphani appears with a blaster. She tries to shoot Regis, but Rinaldo throws himself between the two, taking the full force of the blast. Regis returns Rinaldo's body to be buried at St. Valentine of the Snows.

== Characters ==
- Regis Hastur, the Regent of Darkover.
- Danilo Syrtis-Ardais, paxman to Regis.
- Linnea Storn-Lanart, wife of Regis Hastur by the end of the book.
- Dan Lawton, Terran Legate.
- Tiphani Lawton, Dan's wife, a religious fundamentalist.
- Rinaldo Hastur (or Brother Valentine), a christoforo fundamentalist.

== Publication history ==
- Jan 2010, DAW Books (DAW Collectors #1497), 978-0-7564-0622-6, 421pp, hardcover
- Jan 2010, DAW Books / SFBC, #1294831, 421pp, hardcover
- Mar 2011, DAW Books (DAW Collectors #1497), 978-0-7564-0649-3, $7.99, 482pp, paperback
