= Adrienne Martine-Barnes =

Writer

- Born: Adrienne Zinah Martinez; 19 January 1942; Los Angeles, California, USA
- Died: 20 July 2015 (aged 73); Portland, Oregon

Adrienne Martine-Barnes (19 January 1942 – 20 July 2015), was an American contemporary, non-fiction and fantasy writer.

== Biography ==
Martine-Barnes was born Adrienne Zinah Martinez in Los Angeles in 1942. While in school she wrote two one-act plays which were produced. She attended the University of Redlands and UCLA but did not graduate. In 1964, she married Ronald Hicks, with whom she had one son, Geoffrey. They divorced in 1968.

Martine-Barnes moved to New York City and became an agent. She was a member of the Society for Creative Anachronism while living there. In 1972, she married Larry Barnes. Barnes later vanished while camping in California was presumed dead by authorities.

She did not write her first novel, Never Speak of Love, until 1982. Many of her novels were based in fantasy and mythology. She also wrote with both Diana Paxson and Marion Zimmer Bradley. She was a member of the Science Fiction Writers of America.

She died in 2015 in Oregon and was buried in Kingman, Indiana.

== Bibliography ==
=== Novels ===
- Never Speak of Love (1982)

==== Chronicles of Fionn mac Cumhal ====
- Master of Earth and Water (1993) with Diana L. Paxson
- The Shield Between the Worlds (1994) with Diana L. Paxson
- Sword of Fire and Shadow (1995) with Diana L. Paxson

==== Chronique D'Avebury ====
- The Fire Sword (1984)
- The Crystal Sword (1988)
- The Rainbow Sword (1988)
- The Sea Sword (1989)

==== Darkover ====
- Exile's Song (1996) with Marion Zimmer Bradley
- The Shadow Matrix (1997) with Marion Zimmer Bradley
- Traitor's Sun (1999) with Marion Zimmer Bradley

==== Dragon Rises ====
- The Dragon Rises (1983)

=== Short fiction ===
- Di Catenas (1982)
- Wildwood (1983)
- War Corsets of the Gore (1992)
- The Elements So Mixed (1994)
- People and Places (1994) with Diana L. Paxson
- Flambeaux (1995)
- The Wolf Creek Fragment (1995)
- Winter Tales (1996)
- The Naming of Names (1997)
