= The Heritage of Hastur =

1975 novel by Marion Zimmer Bradley

- Cover of 1975 DAW Books mass market paperback first edition.
- Author: Marion Zimmer Bradley
- Cover artist: Jack Gaughan
- Language: English
- Series: Darkover
- Genre: Science fantasy
- Publisher: DAW Books
- Publication date: 1975
- Publication place: United States
- Media type: Print (paperback)
- Pages: 381
- ISBN: 0-87997-189-4
- Preceded by: The Bloody Sun
- Followed by: The Planet Savers

The Heritage of Hastur is a science fantasy novel by American writer Marion Zimmer Bradley, part of the Darkover series. It was nominated for the Nebula Award for Best Novel in 1975. It explores sexual themes, particularly the view that homosexuality is a normal variant of human sexuality.

The Heritage of Hastur is set in what Bradley called Darkover's Second Age Against the Terrans (after the Comyn). In The Bloody Sun, Lew Alton is described as age 11, which suggests that this book takes place 10–15 years later.

== Plot summary ==
The story, told from the alternating points of view of Regis Hastur and Lewis Alton, starts from the storyline of Regis Hastur.

While riding from Nevarsin to Thendera, Regis Hastur's party encounters Kennard Alton and his sons, Lewis and Marius. Lew introduces Regis to Danilo Syrtis. They ride to Comyn Castle.

When Kennard is injured by a fall, Lew takes over as captain of the guard. He objects to Dyan Ardais being named Cadet Master, because of rumors that Ardais is a pederast and sadist. Kennard overrules his son, saying that the rumors were unfounded.

Members of the Comyn Council meet with the Terran Legate regarding rumors that forbidden weapons are being sold in the city of Caer Donn. The Comyn claim that this is a breach of both the Compact (Darkovan tradition concerning weapons) and of the Terran Empire's treaty with the council. The Terrans claim that Aldaran is essentially a separate country, so different laws apply. The matter is unresolved. Kennard suggests instead that Lew make a diplomatic journey to Aldaran.

Danilo Syrtis is thrown out of the guard for drawing a sword on Cadet Master Ardais. Lew suspects that Ardais has been making sexual advances towards Danilo, but is unable to prove it. Broken, Danilo departs for the Syrtis estate, where Regis later confronts him. After an argument, Danilo reveals the details of Dyan Ardais' attempt to rape him, both physically and telepathically. Regis persuades Danilo to bring charges against Ardais.

Lew arrives at the city of Caer Donn and Aldaran Castle, where he meets Kermiac, Lord Aldaran, who explains Lew's Aldaran family connections. Lew is introduced to his cousin, Beltran, and Lord Aldaran's foster children, Marjorie, Thyra and Rafe Scott, and the mysterious Robert Kadarin. He learns they have been experimenting with matrix technologies. Lew is drawn in, without realizing the dangers, and agrees to help train them. Lew later discovers that Kadarin has acquired Sharra, an ancient and dangerously powerful matrix. Kermiac Aldaran dies as a result of the Sharra Matrix experiments, largely due to a mistake made by the increasingly insane Thyra.

Beltran kidnaps Danilo and tries to force him to join, but Danilo refuses. Regis arrives on horseback in search of Danilo, and departs on horseback after Kermiac Aldaran's funeral. Lew heads to Arillinn with Marjorie Scott, but Beltran's guard return them to Aldaran. Kadarin's experiments result in the destruction of Caer Donn, which Lew had foreseen. Lew attempts to control the Sharra matrix, and he, with the help of Arillinn, is saved. Marjorie Scott dies of her injuries.

The Terrans agree to honor the Compact throughout Darkover, now understanding its true purpose. Dyan Ardais makes amends to Danilo Syrtis by naming Danilo the heir to the Ardais Domain. Regis pledges his life to the service of Darkover. Lew Alton leaves Darkover, taking the Sharra Matrix with him.

== Major characters ==
- Regis-Rafael Felix Alar Hastur y Elhalyn: The heir to the Hastur Domain
- Lewis-Kennard Montray-Alton: The heir to the Alton Domain
- Danilo-Felix Syrtis: The only son of an impoverished noble family
- Kennard Alton, Lord Alton
- Dyan Ardais, Cadet Master & Lord Ardais
- Kermiac, Lord Aldaran
- Beltran of Aldaran, Kermiac's son
- Robert Ramon Kadarin, Kermiac's half-chieri paxman
- Marjorie Scott & Rafe Scott, children of Terran Zeb Scott and half-chieri, Felicia Darriell
- Thyra Scott, daughter of Kermiac Aldaran and half-chieri, Felicia Darriell

== Sources ==
- Jaffery, Sheldon (1987). Future and Fantastic Worlds. Mercer Island, Washington: Starmont House. p. 57. ISBN 1-55742-002-5.
