= The Firebrand (Bradley novel) =

1987 novel by Marion Zimmer Bradley

- First edition hardcover
- Author: Marion Zimmer Bradley
- Cover artist: Wilson McLean
- Language: English
- Genre: Fantasy, war
- Publisher: Simon & Schuster
- Publication date: October 1, 1987
- Publication place: United States
- Media type: Print (hardback & paperback)
- Pages: 608
- ISBN: 0-671-64177-8 (first edition, hardcover)
- OCLC: 53846517

The Firebrand is a 1987 historical fantasy novel by American author Marion Zimmer Bradley. Set in the ancient city of Troy, the novel is a retelling of Homer's epic poem the Iliad. The Firebrand is written from the point of view of Kassandra, the prophet daughter of King Priam of Troy, and also features other prominent characters from Greek mythology. As in the Iliad, Kassandra foresees catastrophe for her city, but few pay heed to her warnings. In Bradley's story, Kassandra is presented as a strong and insightful woman rather than as a sufferer of insanity.

The novel has been described as belonging to the genres of revisionist history and feminist literature and employs themes of gender, religion, and power. Bradley wrote it after the success of her 1983 novel The Mists of Avalon, a retelling of the Arthurian legend from a female perspective. To appeal to a wider readership, The Firebrand includes fewer elements of fantasy than Bradley's previous works. It is her only novel set in ancient Greece. Her husband Walter H. Breen helped her research the story.

Simon & Schuster released The Firebrand on October 1, 1987, in hardcover, and it was issued in paperback in September 1988. The Firebrand has been overshadowed by the popularity of The Mists of Avalon, receiving less attention and critical praise. Reviews of the book ranged from mixed to positive, with many literary critics praising Bradley's ability to give new characterizations to legendary figures. It has been translated into at least twelve languages, beginning with Portuguese and French in 1989.

== Main characters ==
Princess Kassandra of Troy is the story's protagonist, and it is told from her perspective. It begins when an elderly Kassandra tiredly agrees to correct the Homeric version of the Trojan War that is told by a traveling minstrel. Kassandra recounts her life experiences at Troy and Colchis, how she came to balk at the gender roles dictated by Trojan culture, and her inner turmoil over whether she should be serving the Goddess or Apollo.

In her early years, Kassandra is known among her family as the "clever girl", while her older sister Polyxena is the "proper, modest", and "pretty one". Her parents intend for Kassandra to be brought up as a lady and to eventually marry a nobleman—to her gradual displeasure. She often comes into conflict with her father, King Priam, who is characterized as cruel, violent, and power-hungry. Queen Hecuba and Kassandra are not close; the queen often disparages her daughter for her prophecies. Though Hecuba grew up as an Amazon, she gradually adopted patriarchal Trojan customs as her own.

The warrior Hector is close to their sister Polyxena, and is described by Kassandra as a bully. He disapproves of Kassandra's desire to be a warrior, but he is much loved in the city. As an adult, Kassandra reflects, "of all [Priam and Hecuba's children], Hector was closest to their hearts, and [she] the least loved. Was it only that she had always been so different from the others?" Kassandra is happiest when she travels with the Amazons, whose chief Penthesilea becomes a mother figure for Kassandra.

Hector's wife, Andromache, is the elder daughter of Queen Imandra; despite Colchis' matriarchal culture Andromache is content to adopt Trojan culture and be subservient to her husband. She and Kassandra become close, as does Kassandra with Helen, despite her initial distaste for the problems Helen brings to Troy. Despite being her twin, Paris dislikes Kassandra. Early in the story, Bradley writes that Paris' main character flaw is "a total lack of interest in anything that did not relate to himself or contribute in some way to his own comfort and satisfaction."

== Synopsis ==
=== Volume One ===
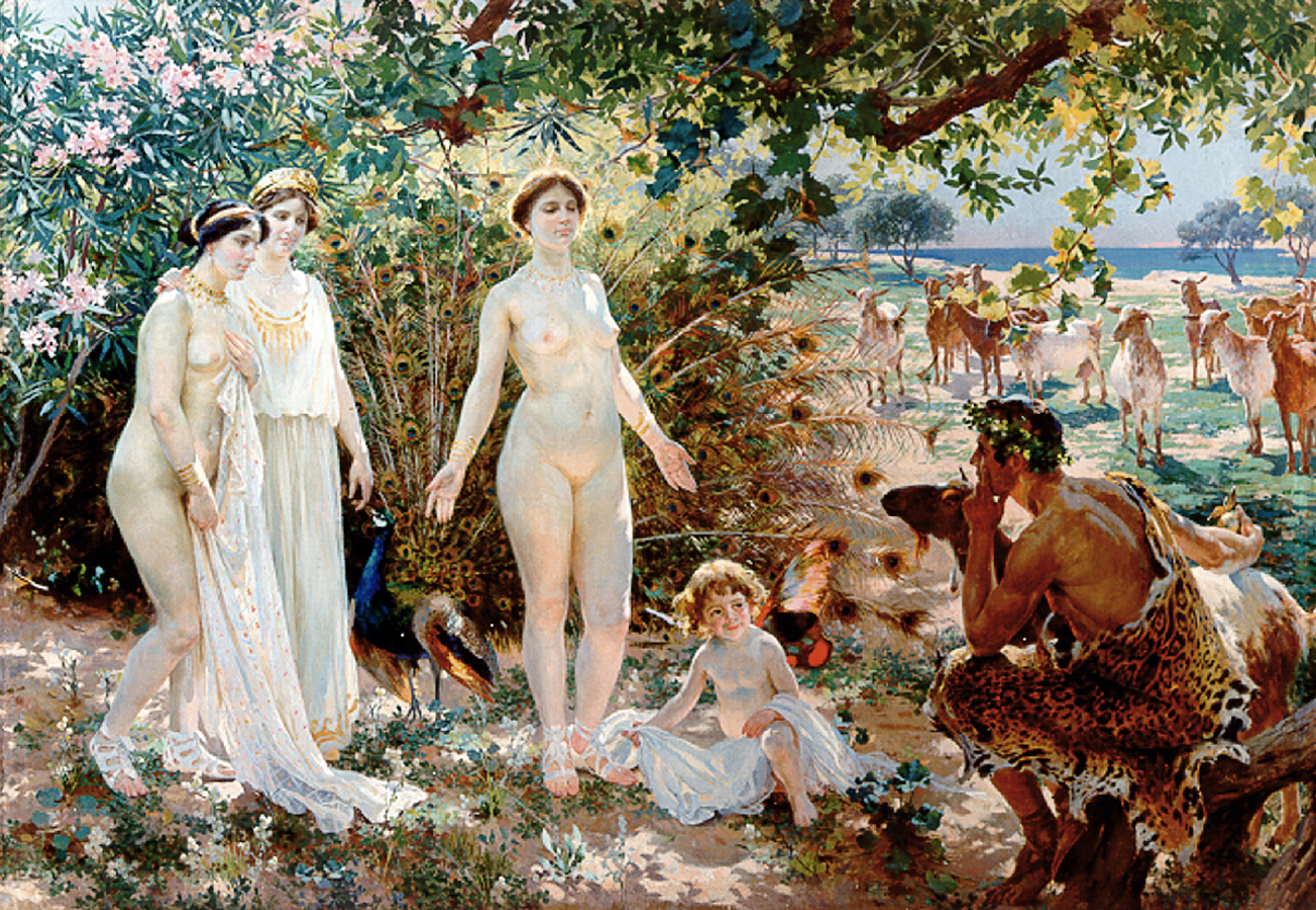
El juicio de Paris by Simonet, 1904: the Judgement of Paris in which Aphrodite promises Paris the love of Helen

In the wealthy and powerful city of Troy, the pregnant queen Hecuba experiences a prophetic dream which distresses her. When consulted, a priestess of the Great Goddess tells Hecuba and her husband, King Priam, that the dream indicates she will birth a son who will bring destruction to Troy. Priam declares that this boy must be exposed to death, but upon his birth three days later, Priam agrees to Hecuba's pleas and has him fostered by a shepherd on the slopes of Mount Ida. Priam names the boy Alexandros (later Paris), and names his twin sister Alexandra, whom Hecuba keeps and decides to call Kassandra.

While visiting the temple of Apollo with her mother, six-year-old Kassandra experiences a vision of the god telling her she is to become "his priestess". In the following years, Kassandra experiences further visions. When she is twelve, Kassandra sees a vision of Paris, who is now a shepherd. Kassandra asks her father the boy's identity but he reacts angrily. Kassandra is sent to be fostered by Hecuba's sister Penthesilea, chief of the Amazons—a nomadic warrior tribe consisting only of women. There, Kassandra comes to love their lifestyle—though it is not without its trials—and she learns of her twin, continuing to experience visions of him. Kassandra sees the Judgement of Paris, in which her brother deems Aphrodite more beautiful than Athena or Hera; Aphrodite rewards Paris by eventually promising the love of Helen of Sparta—daughter of Leda and Zeus.

In Colchis, ruled over by Queen Imandra, Kassandra undergoes the rites of a priestess and is told that serving the Goddess is her destiny. At the age of fifteen, Kassandra is unhappily returned to her home. She arrives during a festival in time to see Paris win and be revealed to his true parents as their son. Despite the prophecy, Priam and Hecuba happily welcome him home. However, Hector and his other brothers, jealous of the attention and achievements Paris has suddenly garnered, suggest that he be sent abroad to treaty with King Agamemnon—who holds Priam's sister. Paris readily agrees. Meanwhile, Kassandra begins training as a priestess of the temple of Apollo, despite misgivings that she is abandoning the Goddess. Part of her duties include helping care for the temple serpents—symbols of Python whom Apollo is said to have slain. Paris returns to Troy with the beautiful Helen, wife of King Menelaus, and she is welcomed into the city. Kassandra's warnings that Helen will destroy Troy go unheeded, and Paris denounces his sister as a madwoman.

=== Volume Two ===
At the temple, Kassandra is assaulted by Khryse, a priest who disguises himself as Apollo in order to seduce her. She sees through his trickery and fights him off, but the god feels insulted by her refusal and makes the city's residents stop believing her prophecies. Menelaus' brother Agamemnon uses Helen's flight as a pretext for war and soon begins launching daily raids on Troy, beginning the Trojan War. Kassandra spends more time with her family to help with daily tasks while the men—led by Hector—fight off the Akhaian invaders. The war continues sporadically despite the attempts of former Trojan ally Odysseus to end the conflict.

Two years into the war, Kassandra returns to Colchis to learn more of serpent lore. Along the way, she encounters Penthesilea. Kassandra is unhappy to find that the nomadic ways of life of the Amazon and Kentaur are ending, and that Penthesilea's tribe is dwindling in number. Kassandra experiences a horrifying vision of Apollo firing arrows indiscriminately at both armies—a sign of his wrath—which prompts her to return home. Accompanied with an adopted infant daughter named Honey whom she finds alongside the road, Kassandra returns to Troy and finds that the war is not going well for the Trojans.

Soon after her return, Apollo takes the form of Khryse and spreads a plague in the Akhaians' camp in response to Agamemnon's sacrilegious refusal to return Khryse's daughter, who has been Agamemnon's prisoner for three years. Khryse's daughter is reluctantly returned to her father and the Akhaian leader takes the young warrior Akhilles' concubine as reparation for his loss. The furious Akhilles refuses to continue fighting. Menelaus and Paris duel each other, but Paris flees the fight due to the intervention of Helen and Aphrodite.

=== Volume Three ===
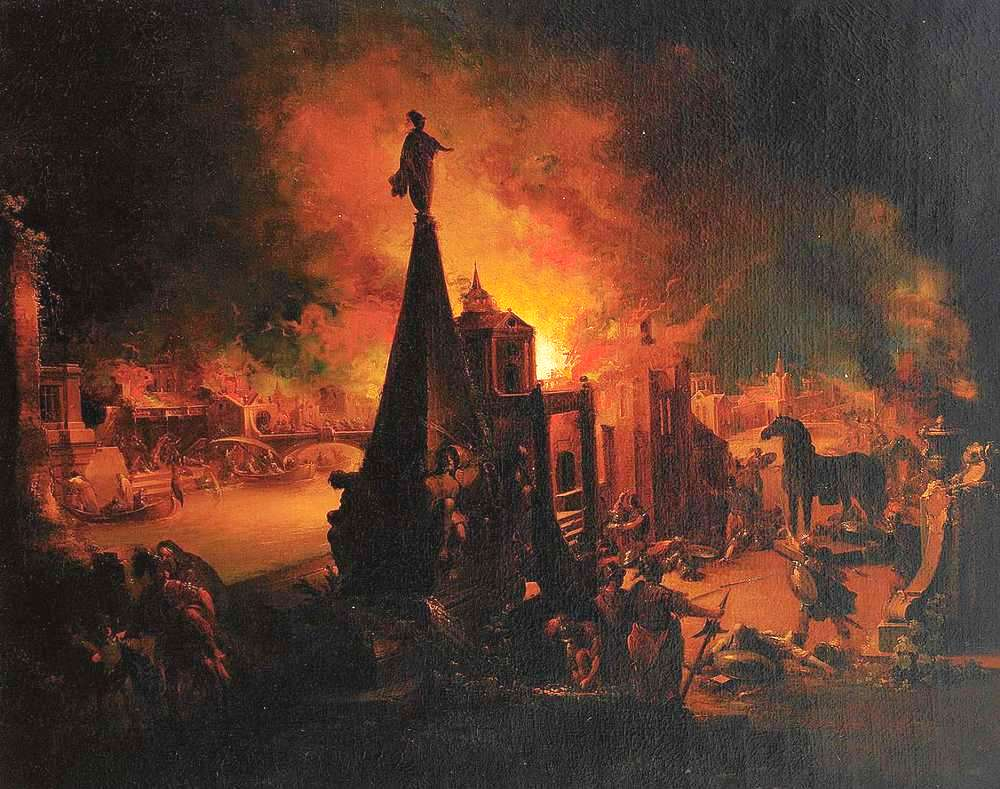
Blick auf das brennende Troja by Trautmann: the Sack of Troy in which the Akhaians invade the city

Most of Kassandra's family has come to think of her as mad, and become angry when she feels compelled to vocalize prophecies that foretell the end of Troy. Despite Kassandra's warnings, the city experiences an earthquake sent by Poseidon, killing the three young sons of Helen and Paris. After Patroklus is killed by Hector, his closest friend Akhilles again joins the fight to get his revenge. Hector and his younger brother Troilus are killed, to the grief of everyone in Troy. Akhilles kills Penthesilea in battle, and soon after Kassandra fires a fatally poisoned arrow at his unprotected heel.

Poseidon sends another earthquake, knocking down Troy's defenses. The Akhaians flood into the city, and Kassandra and Honey are raped by the warrior Ajax. The women of Troy are divided up among the Akhaians, and Kassandra becomes Agamemnon's concubine. She is freed when his wife Klytemnestra murders him upon their return to Mykenae. Kassandra makes her way back to Asia Minor, where in the desert she hopes to recreate a kingdom of old—one ruled by a powerful queen.

== Development ==
Zeus of Dodona, give heed to this gift
I send you from me and my family-
Agathon son of Ekhephylos,
the Zakythian family,
Consuls of the Molossian and their allies,
descended for 30 generations
from Kassandra of Troy.

— Inscription found on a tablet in the
Archaeological Museum in Athens

Marion Zimmer Bradley's previous novel The Mists of Avalon was a re-telling of the Arthurian legend from the point of view of Arthur's antagonist, Morgan le Fay. Bradley wrote The Firebrand after publishing The Mists of Avalon in 1983. According to The Encyclopedia of Fantasy, after The Mists of Avalon Bradley wrote stories with a strong literary appeal to appeal to a wide readership rather than focus on the fantasy genre. Bradley's later works often centered on strong lead characters in "mytho-historic settings" with few fantasy elements. For instance, in The Firebrand the Kentaurs are depicted as a nomadic tribe of short, naked riders of horses rather than as the half-human, half-horsemen legends traditionally portray.

The Firebrand is Bradley's second re-telling of a famous legend, and her only novel set in ancient Greece. She decided to re-envision legends from a female perspective, and said that she had an interest to "hear more about the human realities" surrounding well-known stories, but did not believe this constituted a feminist writing style. In an interview with Lisa See of Publishers Weekly, Bradley said she viewed the Trojan War legend as an example of masculine culture dominating and obfuscating female viewpoints and contributions. She said:

During the Dorian invasion, when iron won out over bronze, the female cult died. The Minoan and Mycenaean cultures were dead overnight. But you could also look at that period of history and say, here were two cultures that should have been ruled by female twins—Helen and Klytemnestra. And what do you know? When they married Menelaus and Agamemnon, the men took over their cities. I just want to look at what history was really like before the women-haters got hold of it. I want to look at these people like any other people, as though no one had ever written about them before.

Unlike The Mists of Avalon, which featured a wide range of Arthurian legends that Bradley drew upon as source material, Bradley cited few sources while writing The Firebrand. She credits her then-husband, author Walter H. Breen, with helping her research the book and create the story. Breen was knowledgeable about ancient Greek history and language; according to Bradley he persuaded her to use linguistically correct transliterations of the characters' names, such as Akhilles rather than the commonly known form Achilles. Though Kassandra's fate remains unknown in the Iliad, Bradley found inspiration for the character's ending from an inscription at the Archaeological Museum in Athens, which mentioned Kassandra's descendants. Bradley believed that this inscription provided the historical basis for Kassandra's existence.

== Themes and analysis ==
=== Gender roles ===
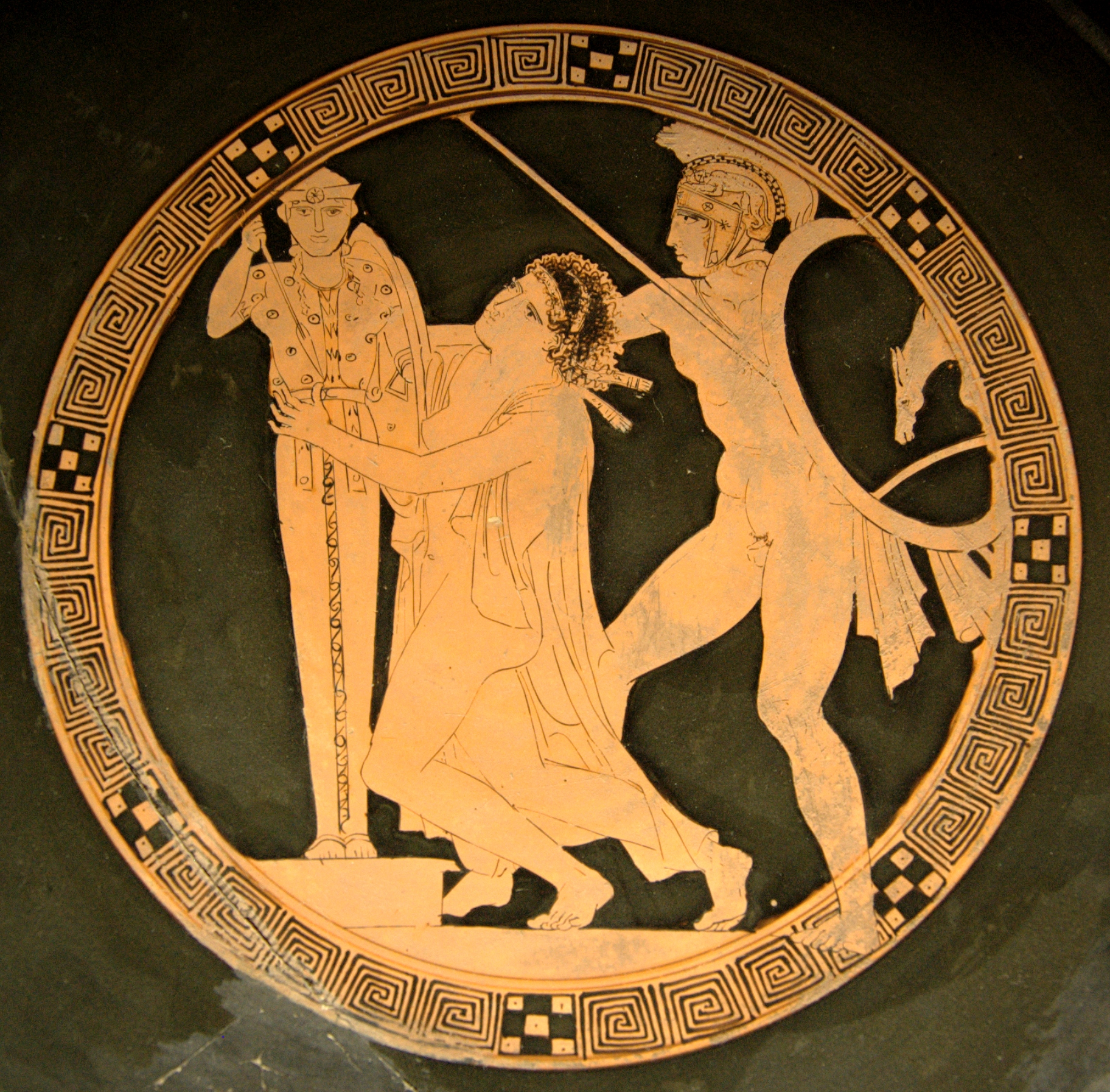
Ajax raping Cassandra on an Attic red-figure pottery cup, c. 440-430 BC: Classical depictions of Cassandra show her with characteristics associated with insanity, such as nudity and wild hair.

In the original story found in the Iliad, female characters receive little attention; although they are often crucial to progressing events, they have no developed identities of their own, and are instead defined by motherhood, wifehood, and sisterhood. Cassandra is described in that story as "the loveliest of [Priam's] lovely daughters," but does not speak at all. Today she is remembered for portending the city's doom and for not being believed by its inhabitants, who think she is mad. On ancient Greek pottery she is depicted as half naked with long, wild hair, and William Shakespeare's 1602 play Troilus and Cressida characterizes her as an insane woman. After the Akhaians use the Trojan Horse to enter Troy, the Aeneid and other accounts relay how Cassandra is raped by Ajax, is taken captive by Agamemnon, and is later killed with him by his angry wife Clytemnestra. By setting her story from the female perspective, Bradley gives women—especially the formerly silent Cassandra—a voice. Here, Kassandra is depicted as a strong and insightful woman rather than as a lunatic, yet she is still misunderstood by many of those around her. She is allowed to survive Klytemnestra's wrath to record a female counter-narrative.

The Firebrand employs similar themes to Bradley's other works, including the reversal of gender roles where "women are the true heroes" while the "proud, arrogant" men who lead Troy to doom "fail to invoke the reader's sympathy". The novel's title refers to Paris and the destruction he brings to Troy. The Firebrand has been perceived as belonging to the revisionist history genre, as it fits into a "reinvent[ion of] stories that are either historical or derived from myth/legend but often taken to be historical," and then told with a different narrative. The novel has also been seen as an example of feminist literature. Despite Bradley's refusal to label herself as a feminist, her works often dealt with themes of gender, religion, and power, particularly in historically patriarchal societies. In The Firebrand, Bradley introduces feminist ideals by equating the patriarchal culture with oppressive tendencies; perceived to have been scorned by the male god Apollo, Kassandra is not believed by Trojan citizens because of her gender.

Funda Basak Dorschel noted that because there is "no humanity or compassion in this masculine world," characters traditionally associated with noble, positive qualities are instead "stripped of their own glamor" and are portrayed in a negative light—Akhilles for instance is a "mad dog" who rapes Penthesilea as an act of cold-blooded contempt, rather than as an act of sudden love upon causing her death. Agamemnon and Menelaus are rendered as patriarchal stereotypes. In her entry for Science Fiction & Fantasy Book Review Annual, Mary-Kay Bray wrote that Bradley's account makes these traditional heroes seem more human and flawed, even if they are also less admirable.

=== Religion and gender ===
Bradley believed that "cultural shock, the clash of alien cultures, is the essence of literature and drama," and incorporated this viewpoint into many of her works. The Firebrand is set in a time of change and Kassandra is caught between new and old cultures. Despite being ruled by a king and worshiping the male god Apollo, the Trojans still respect the ancient cult surrounding the Earth Mother. In Colchis, the powerful queen Imandra rules alone but her way of life is declining—she is aging and uncertain of her successor, and the impoverished areas surrounding Colchis contain two other dwindling civilizations; the Amazons and the Kentaurs.

Literary critics have observed elements of neo-paganism in the novel. Bradley often included characteristics of neo-paganism into her stories as she explored the intersection of gender and religion. While neo-paganism lacks a singular definition, many followers have come to define it as a primitive, matriarchal religion that flourished in Western Europe, centered on the worship of a "Mother Goddess", and became largely decimated by Christianity. Fry wrote that "a basic assumption [in The Firebrand] is that the people of ancient Greece had worshiped the Goddess prior to the arrival of the Akhaians," a people who brought with them a "male warrior pantheon of Gods ... and gradually subverted the old ways." Bradley's Penthesilea tells a young Kassandra, "But remember, child: before ever Apollo Sun Lord came to rule these lands, our Horse Mother—the Great Mare, the Earth Mother from whom we all are born—she was here."

The Firebrand combines two belief systems and mixes neo-paganism with elements of Greek mythology. Scholars have found similarities between The Firebrand and The Mists of Avalon; they serve "parallel purposes" by retelling old legends from female perspectives. Both stories deal with the confrontation between female-based, Earth-centered belief systems and rising patriarchal religions. This religious dichotomy appears first as a conflict between Apollo and the Goddess, and later as a confrontation between the Akhaian and Trojan gods. In the novel's tradition, serpents represent the Mother Goddess' prominent place in religious life, immortality, rebirth, and regeneration. Readers are told that Python—a female snake deity and symbol of the Goddess—was slain by the Hellenistic Apollo, representing the destruction of feminine social, political, and religious power.

Bradley also uses the story's female characters to create a feminist dichotomy; Kassandra and Penthesilea represent the "feminist side" in their pursuit of independence, while many of the other women—such as Andromache, Hecuba, and Helen—"subordinate themselves to patriarchal traditions, values, goods." The loss of this matriarchal culture has been viewed as the novel's main theme. Bradley writes of the power of women in many of her works, including The Mists of Avalon and the Darkover series, and The Firebrand continues this by depicting Kassandra in an idealized world; the Amazons follow the Earth Goddess but are slowly dwindling in the wake of the patriarchal "male warrior pantheon of Gods." Through Kassandra's experiences with the Amazons, Bradley shows that she idealizes this group of women.

== Release ==
The novel was published on October 1, 1987 by Simon & Schuster, and a paperback edition was released in September 1988. In 1989, The Firebrand was translated into Portuguese by A. B. Pinheiro de Lemos and into French by Hubert Tezenas. It has been published in at least ten other languages, including Italian, German, Lithuanian, Japanese, and modern Greek.

=== Reception ===
The Firebrand has received less critical attention and success than Bradley's earlier novel The Mists of Avalon, which has tended to overshadow it. The Firebrand received mixed to positive reviews from mainstream literary critics. Magill Book Reviews applauded Bradley's faithfulness to the source material in the Iliad, despite the "startling liberties [she takes] with Homer's work." However, the reviewer said her themes of gender and religion, "rendered artfully and gracefully in [The Mists of Avalon], becomes tiresome with repetition." Bradley said that some readers would take umbrage at her changes to the Trojan legend; she said, "had I been content with the account in the Iliad, there would have been no reason to write a novel. Besides, the Iliad stops short just at the most interesting point, leaving the writer to conjecture about the end from assorted legends and traditions." The Library Journal said readers should familiarize themselves with Greek mythology before beginning the novel, and said the author "makes a strong statement about the desirability of women having control of their own destinies and about the cruelties men inflict upon them." The Encyclopedia of Fantasy said that The Firebrand and Bradley's 1994 novel The Forest House "display [Bradley's] talent for plot, character, vision and fine storytelling."

Reviewing for The Globe and Mail, H.J. Kirchhoff compared The Firebrand to The Mists of Avalon, and wrote that the former "is neither as refreshing nor as lovely, even though it is a pretty good read." Kirchhoff wrote that The Firebrand contained too many similarities to Bradley's previous novels, saying, "the interlarding of old story and feminist ideology seems forced," though he praised her "flesh-and-blood" depiction of the men associated with the legend. Vicki McCash of the Sun Sentinel commended the novel for making the legendary characters "breathe and feel" and for giving a "refreshing" twist to the ancient story. McCash wrote, "From the first pages, the reader is gripped in the magic of ancient Troy. These stories have been revered for centuries, but in The Firebrand they are retold to become one epic novel, not only of heroes and gods, but of heroines and goddesses and of change in the very fabric of society." McCash said that male readers might be troubled by the negative portrayals of their sex, but that Bradley attempted to avoid this by inputting a few sympathetic men such as Aeneas, and several evil women such as Klytemnestra. Virginia Judge of The Herald called it a "fascinating, but lengthy tale," and praised Bradley's depictions of the old religion. She criticized the ending for seeming "contrived."

A reviewer for the English Journal praised the novel and found one of its main strengths is "its ability to entertain the reader with characters who are basically faithful to their origins in the Iliad, yet at the same time rounder, fuller, and more personally engaging." The reviewer wrote the Bradley "fleshes out the stereotypes on which the characterization in the epic poem rests—the cold calculating Achilles; crafty, gregarious Odysseus; frustrated Cassandra—with convincing dialogue which not only carries the plot but gives reference to other events both mythical and historical." The English Journal also said that "Bradley tempers the bitterness and cynicism of Homer's Cassandra, presenting instead a woman confused and tormented by knowledge on which she is powerless to act." In an overview of Bradley's body of work, Encyclopedia of Fantasy and Horror Fiction author Don D'Amassa called the novel "one of her better fantasies." Bradley's works have received praise from feminist critics, who have particularly lauded her ability to portray multidimensional women as "revered conduit[s] of nature-based religion and mysticism" as seen with the character of Kassandra. At the 1988 Locus Awards, The Firebrand was voted the twentieth best fantasy novel of the year.

== See also ==
- List of fantasy novels
- Trojan War in popular culture

== Sources ==
- Adamson, Lynda G. (1999). World Historical Fiction: An Annotated Guide to Novels for Adults and Young Adults. Phoenix: Oryx Press. p. 9. ISBN 1-57356-066-9. "marion zimmer bradley the firebrand 1987."
- Bradley, Marion Zimmer (1987). The Firebrand (2003 ed.). New York: Roc Printing. ISBN 0-451-45924-5.
- Bray, Mary-Kay (1988). "Bradley, Marion Zimmer. The Firebrand. Simon & Schuster, NY, 1987, 603p". In Catherine Fischer; Robert A. Collins; Robert Latham (eds.). Science Fiction & Fantasy Book Review Annual. Meckler. ISBN 0-88736-249-4.
- Chauvette, Cathy (1994). Standley Berger, Laura (ed.). "Marion Zimmer Bradley: Overview". Twentieth-Century Young Adult Writers. Detroit: St. James Press. (subscription required)
- Clute, John; John Grant (1997). The Encyclopedia of Fantasy. New York: St. Martin's Press. ISBN 978-0-312-19869-5.
- Crosby, Janice C. (2000). Cauldron of Changes: Feminist Spirituality in Fantastic Fiction. Jefferson: McFarland & Company, Inc. ISBN 9780786408481.
- D'Ammassa, Don (2006). Encyclopedia of Fantasy and Horror Fiction. New York: Facts on Files, Inc. ISBN 978-1-4381-0909-1.
- Dorschel, Funda Basak (2011). "Female Identity": Rewritings of Greek and Biblical Myths by Contemporary Women Writers (PDF) (dissertation). Middle East Technical University.
- Frederick, Sally R. (January 1989). "Booksearch: The Firebrand". English Journal. 78 (1): 85.
- Fry, Carrol L. (1993). "The Goddess Ascending: Feminist Neo-Pagan Witchcraft in Marian Zimmer Bradley's Novels". Journal of Popular Culture. 27 (1): 67–80. doi:10.1111/j.0022-3840.1993.64521458967.x.
- Komar, Kathleen (2003). Reclaiming Klytemnestra: Revenge Or Reconciliation. Champaign: University of Illinois Press. ISBN 0-252-02811-2.
- Paxson, Diana L. (Spring 1999). "Marion Zimmer Bradley and The Mists of "Avalon"". Arthuriana. 9 (1): 110–26. doi:10.1353/art.1999.0030. JSTOR 27869424. S2CID 162369166. (subscription required)
- Raddeker, Hélène Bowen (November 2009). "Eco/Feminism and History in Fantasy Writing by Women". Outskirts. 21 (1).
- Reid, Robin Anne (2009). Women in Science Fiction and Fantasy (PDF). Westport: Greenwood Press.
- Roberts, Virginia Woods (2001). "Bradley, Marion Zimmer". In Ray B. Browne; Pat Browne (eds.). The Guide to United States Popular Culture. Madison: University of Wisconsin Press. ISBN 0-87972-821-3.
- Michael D. Sharp, ed. (2006). "Marion Zimmer Bradley". Popular Contemporary Writers Set. Marshall Cavendish Corporation. pp. 237–250. ISBN 0-7614-7601-6.
- Smith, Jeannette C. (December 31, 1993). "Myth as Source: Four Feminist Fantasy Novels by Marion Zimmer Bradley". Creative Woman. 13 (3): 37.
- Snodgrass, Mary Ellen (2006). Encyclopedia of Feminist Literature. New York: Facts on Files, Inc. ISBN 978-1-4381-0910-7.
- Thompson, Diane P. (2004). The Trojan War: Literature and Legends From the Bronze Age to the Present. Jefferson: McFarland & Company, Inc. ISBN 0-7864-1737-4.
