= The Forest House =

1994 novel by Marion Zimmer Bradley

- First edition cover
- Author: Marion Zimmer Bradley
- Cover artist: John Jude Palencar
- Language: English
- Genre: Fantasy novel
- Publisher: Viking Press
- Publication date: 1 April 1994
- Publication place: United States
- Media type: Print (Hardback & Paperback)
- Pages: 432
- ISBN: 0-670-84454-3
- OCLC: 29184773
- Dewey Decimal: 813/.54 20
- LC Class: PS3552.R228 F67 1994
- Preceded by: The Mists of Avalon
- Followed by: Lady of Avalon

The Forest House is a fantasy novel by American writers Marion Zimmer Bradley and Diana L. Paxson, though the latter is uncredited by the publisher. It is a prequel to Bradley's Arthurian novel The Mists of Avalon.

The plot of The Forest House is based on that of the opera Norma, relocated from Gaul to Britain, but sharing the basic plot outline of a love affair between a Druidic priestess and a Roman officer.

== Background ==
The Forest House is set in the first century CE in the west of Britain, which was then part of the Roman Empire. Bradley wrote of the conquest of the Celtic tribes and the political and religious implications of the occupation. The novel revolves around the Druidic priestesses who serve the Goddess and keep the ancient rites of learning, healing, and magic lore in their sanctuary, The Forest House. The forbidden love between the priestess Eilan and the Roman officer Gaius is one of the book's principal story lines. Bradley tells the story from both the British, female, druidic perspective, and the Roman, male, legionary perspective, and does so without apparent prejudice, in a style characteristic of her Avalon Series.

== Plot summary ==
In the early days of the conquest, when the Roman Legions are aggressively persecuting the Druids, the sanctuary of the Goddess on the isle of Mona is destroyed and its Druids are murdered and its priestesses are raped. Mona had enjoyed a degree of independence from Roman rule for almost twenty years because Boudica's revolt had forced Roman general Gaius Suetonius Paulinus to withdraw before consolidating his conquest. When the Romans returned under Gnaeus Julius Agricola, they were determined to decisively break the power of the Druids. They destroyed the sacred groves, raped all the women and murdered any Druids who resisted. After the destruction of the sanctuary, those raped priestesses who conceived killed all the girl children but left the boys that were born alive, then killed themselves rather than live with the atrocities done to them. The surviving males later became a rebel group known as the Ravens, which swore vengeance against Rome. Lhiannon, one of the remaining priestesses, re-establishes a new sanctuary at Vernemeton (Most Holy Grove), or The Forest House, which is partially controlled and protected by the Romans.

The novel tells the story of Eilan, granddaughter of the Arch-Druid of Britain. She hears the calling of the Goddess and is chosen to become a priestess at Vernemeton, and later to succeed the dying Lhiannon as High Priestess. However, before her calling, she hears the voice of her heart, and during the magic night of Beltaine, conceives a son with Roman officer Gaius Macellius, son of the high-ranking Camp Prefect at nearby Deva. Gaius is an inheritant of royal blood through his Celtic mother of a southern tribe, the Silures. Eilan knows their son, Gawen, whose bloodline comes from the Dragon (Celtic royalty), the Eagle (Roman Empire), and from the Wise (Druids), will play a crucial role in Britain's future, and makes great sacrifices to protect him in his youth.

A major shift in the balance of power is in the air; Eilan senses that the death of her peace-loving Arch-Druid grandfather will cause it. She tells her friend Caillean (who was rescued from her uncaring mother in Hibernia by Lhiannon) to take a group of young priestesses to the isle of Avalon to found a new sanctuary and become the first high-priestess of Avalon. In Vernemeton, Eilan is increasingly pressured by the new Arch-Druid, her father, to stop promoting peace and collaboration with the Romans. In a dramatic showdown she sacrifices herself (along with her love Gaius) to avoid a bloody insurgency and, in particular, to save the life of her son Gawen.

== Development ==
The Mists of Avalon, a retelling of the King Arthur myth from a feminist point of view, is Marion Zimmer Bradley's most famous single novel. Over the years, and through collaboration with her sister-in-law, Diana L. Paxson, it has grown into a series of books: The Mists of Avalon (1982), The Forest House (1994), Lady of Avalon (1997), Priestess of Avalon (2000), Ancestors of Avalon (2004), Ravens of Avalon (2007), and Sword of Avalon (2009).

Although Paxson is uncredited, Bradley acknowledged her contribution: In Sword and Sorceress XI Bradley wrote in her introduction for Paxson's Spirit Singer

...when I decided to write the story mentioned at the end of Mists of Avalon—about Roman Britain and the Druid priestess Eilan—it was Diana I chose to collaborate with me on it. Because of marketing decisions, Viking decided my name alone would sell better—I'm not sure why—but here among friends, so to speak, I'm happy to acknowledge Diana's help and input.'.

In the Author's Note, Marion Zimmer Bradley says that the hymns in chapters 5, 22, and 30 are adapted from the libretto of Vincenzo Bellini's opera Norma. The hymns in chapters 17 and 24 are from the Carmina Gadelica collected by Rev. Alexander Carmichael in the late 19th century.

== Reception ==
The novel received a mixed reception, with reviewers comparing it unfavorably to The Mists of Avalon. Entertainment Weekly praised the novel for being "meticulously researched" and noted that it "maintains a dark edge, staying true to the turbulent times. Bradley avoids the all-too-frequent fate of the historical-novel genre: collapsing into a soggy mess." It was less successful than The Mists of Avalon, though it sold modestly well.
