= Spirituality of Avalon =

Concept popularized by Arthurian fantasy novels

The Spirituality of Avalon is a spiritual concept originating in Celtic and Arthurian literature, and later popularized in Marion Zimmer Bradley's novel The Mists of Avalon and other novels of the so-called Avalon series. As a product of fantasy fiction, set in a fictitious British past (partly on the titular Isle of Avalon), the modern literary spiritual path draws on neopaganism, such as Wicca, druidry and what is generally known as Goddess worship or Goddess spirituality/religion.

Religious aspects of the Avalon series are discussed in The Spirituality of Avalon: The Religion of the Great Goddess in Marion Zimmer Bradley's Avalon Cycle (2010) by J.S. Morgane, a book-length study of "the religion of the Great Mother as portrayed in Marion Zimmer Bradley's Avalon books. By looking at the literary and archaeological background of the ancient, Neolithic, Celtic, Roman and Arthurian traditions the novels are set in, a close reading of the texts gives the reader the possibility to engage with the concept of the Goddess within the religion created in the Avalon cycle."

== See also ==
- Goddess movement
- Celtic Neopaganism
- Witch-cult hypothesis
- Triple Goddess (Neopaganism)
- Horned God
