= Millennial Women =

- The cover of the 1978 first edition
- Author: Edited by Virginia Kidd
- Language: English
- Genre: Science fiction, social science fiction, feminist science fiction, utopian and dystopian fiction
- Publisher: Delacorte Press, Dell Publishing (first edition, hardcover)
- Publication date: 1978 (first edition, hardcover)
- Publication place: United States
- Media type: Print (hardcover and softcover)
- Pages: 305 pp (first edition, hardcover)
- ISBN: 0-440-05599-7 (first edition, hardcover)
- OCLC: 3710726
- LC Class: PZ5 .M6
- Followed by: Also published under the title The Eye of the Heron and Other Stories

Millennial Women is a 1978 science fiction anthology, edited by Virginia Kidd, in which all the stories are written by women and have a female character as the primary protagonist. The themes which these stories have in common are those of social science fiction: that which is perceived as alien, the uses of language, careers, familial relationships, sexual politics, social constructions of gender, political freedom and equality.

== Contents ==
- "Prayer for My Daughter" by Marilyn Hacker (prefatory poem)
- "Introduction" by Virginia Kidd
- "No One Said Forever" by Cynthia Felice (short story)
- "The Song of N'Sardi-El" by Diana L. Paxson (short story)
- "Jubilee's Story" by Elizabeth A. Lynn (short story)
- "Mab Gallen Recalled" by Cherry Wilder (short story)
- "Phoenix in the Ashes" by Joan D. Vinge (novelette)
- "The Eye of the Heron" by Ursula K. Le Guin (novella)
- Biographical Notes (not included in all editions).

== Awards and nominations ==
- 1979, Locus Award, Best SF Anthology category, 12th place.

== Release details ==
- 1978, Millennial Women, edited by Virginia Kidd, U.S., Delacorte Press (Dell Publishing), ISBN 0-440-05599-7, ISBN 978-0-440-05599-0, pp. 305, 1978, hardcover
- 1979, Millennial Women, edited by Virginia Kidd, U.S., Dell Publishing, ISBN 0-440-16301-3, ISBN 978-0-440-16301-5, April 1979, softcover
- 1980, The Eye of the Heron and Other Stories, edited by Virginia Kidd, UK, Panther Books (Granada Publishing), ISBN 0-586-05089-2, pp. 251, 5 June 1980, softcover
