= The Eye of the Heron =

1978 novel by Ursula K. Le Guin

- Cover of first edition (hardback)
- Author: Ursula K. Le Guin
- Original title: Originally published in the Millennial Women anthology
- Language: English
- Genre: Science fiction, utopian and dystopian fiction, social science fiction, feminist science fiction
- Publisher: Delacorte Press
- Publication date: 1978
- Publication place: United States
- Media type: Print (hardback & paperback)
- Pages: 192
- ISBN: 0-89340-651-1
- OCLC: 12449108

The Eye of the Heron is a 1978 science fiction novel by American author Ursula K. Le Guin which was first published in the science fiction anthology Millennial Women.

== Plot introduction ==
The Eye of the Heron is a science fiction novel set on the fictional planet of Victoria in a speculative future, probably sometime in the 22nd century, when the planet has been colonized for about a century and has no communication with Earth. The protagonist is a young woman called Luz but the story is told in the third person and the reader sees events from the point of view of several different characters. The Eye of the Heron is usually treated as one of Le Guin's minor novels although it exhibits her characteristic prose style and themes.

== Title ==
The title is a reference to a fictional animal on the planet Victoria which early colonists called heron because of some superficial similarities to Earth heron. The characters' encounters with these animals occur at moments of significant introspection, particularly when they are considering that which they perceive as alien, or other, in relation to themselves.

== Plot summary ==
The planet of Victoria received two waves of colonists from Earth: first two prison ships founding a penal colony and then one ship of political exiles. The descendants of the prisoners mostly inhabit the city. The descendants of the political exiles, the "People of Peace", inhabit Shantih Town, which is known to the City dwellers as Shanty Town. The Shantih Towners, whose primary occupation is farming, want to settle another valley further away from the city. The City "Bosses" do not want to lose the control they believe they have over the Shanty Towners and so they take action to try to prevent any settlement beyond their sphere of influence.

== Characters ==
=== City characters ===
- Luz Marina Falco Cooper
- Luis Burnier Falco (Luz's father and a Boss)
- Herman Macmilan
- Captain Eden

=== Shantih Town characters ===
- Vera Adelson
- Lev Shults
- Southwind
- Andre
- Hari
- Elia

== Major themes ==
The major themes in The Eye of the Heron are common to much of Le Guin's fiction and include the social constructions of gender, interactions between individuals from different societies, intra-actions within societies, and contact with that which is perceived as alien or other. The novel also explores different forms of social and political organization by juxtaposing pacifist anarchism with violent oligarchy. The characters' metaphorical internal journeys are reflected in literal external journeys throughout the plot.

When asked, in a 1995 interview, what role the feminist movement had played in her writing, Le Guin situated The Eye of the Heron in the context of her development as a writer:

I gradually realized that my own fiction was telling me that I could no longer ignore the feminine. While I was writing The Eye of the Heron in 1977, the hero insisted on destroying himself before the middle of the book. "Hey," I said, "you can't do that, you're the hero. Where's my book?" I stopped writing. The book had a woman in it, but I didn't know how to write about women. I blundered around a while and then found some guidance in feminist theory. I got excited when I discovered feminist literary criticism was something I could read and actually enjoy. I read The Norton Book of Literature by Women from cover to cover. It was a bible for me. It taught me that I didn't have to write like an honorary man anymore, that I could write like a woman and feel liberated in doing so.

== Allusions in other works ==
The Eye of the Heron contains the phrase "beginning place". Le Guin incorporated it into the title of her 1980 novel The Beginning Place.

== Awards and nominations ==
- 1979, Locus Award, Best SF Novel category, 21st place.

== Release details ==
- 1978, in Millennial Women, edited by Virginia Kidd, U.S., Delacorte Press (Dell Publishing), ISBN 978-0-440-05599-0, pp. 305, 1978, hardcover
- 1979, in Millennial Women, edited by Virginia Kidd, Dell Publishing, ISBN 978-0-440-16301-5, April 1979, serial?
- 1980, in The Eye of the Heron and Other Stories, edited by Virginia Kidd, UK, Panther Books (Granada Publishing), ISBN 0-586-05089-2, pp. 251, 5 June 1980, paperback
- 1982, The Eye of the Heron, UK, Victor Gollancz, ISBN 978-0-575-03211-8, pp. 122 or 144, 30 September 1982, hardcover
- 1982, The Eye of the Heron, U.S., Harper & Row (HarperCollins), ISBN 978-0-06-015086-0, pp. 179, December 1982, hardcover
- 1984, The Eye of the Heron, Bantam Books (Random House), ISBN 978-0-553-24258-4, pp. 179, 1 August 1984, paperback
- 1988, The Eye of the Heron, U.S., J. Curley, ISBN 978-0-89340-651-6, pp. 246, 6 January 1988, large print, paperback,
- 1991, The Eye of the Heron, U.S., Harper Paperbacks (HarperCollins), ISBN 978-0-06-100138-3, pp. 198 or 208, 1 January 1991, paperback
- 1991, The Eye of the Heron with The Word for World is Forest, UK, VGSF (Victor Gollancz), ISBN 978-0-575-05060-0, pp. 256 or 301, 6 June 1991, paperback
- 2000, The Eye of the Heron, Thorndike Press (Thomson Gale), ISBN 978-0-7838-8843-9, pp. 204, January 2000, large print?, hardcover
- 2003, The Eye of the Heron, Starscape Books (Tor Books), ISBN 978-0-7653-4612-4, pp. 192, September 2003, paperback
- 2024, in Ursula K. Le Guin: Five Novels, edited by Brian Attebery, Library of America #379, ISBN 978-1-59853-773-4, pp. 1000, hardcover

== See also ==
- List of books about anarchism
