= Lady of Light =

- Cover of the 1982 Pocket edition
- Author: Diana L. Paxson
- Language: English
- Publication date: 1982

Lady of Light is a 1982 novel written by Diana L. Paxson.

== Plot summary ==
Lady of Light is a novel in which Faris is insecure about her strong magical potential and suppresses it, believing her fire-scarred arm makes her unworthy. The King of Westria, though powerful, requires a queen to fully harness the kingdom's elemental jewels gifted by the gods and to secure an heir. Despite obstacles, Faris and the King are drawn to each other. Overcoming challenges, she is accepted as queen and quickly begins intensive magical training to wield the four elemental jewels, though priests harbor doubts about her role.

== Reception ==
John T. Sapienza, Jr. reviewed Lady of Light for Different Worlds magazine and stated that "What makes Lady of Light a standout in a crowd of fantasy novels is that it is written like a good historical novel. The plot elements do not turn on any of the usual things recycled from Tolkien. There is no quest for a magical widget, and there is no Ancient Evil other than human folly. Instead, there are struggles between nations and within nations that a student of history, particularly English history, will recognize."

== Reviews ==
- Review by Lynn F. Williams (1982) in Science Fiction & Fantasy Book Review, #10, December 1982
- Review by Judith Hanna (1983) in Paperback Inferno, Volume 6, Number 5
- Review by Charles de Lint (1983) in Dragonfields: Tales of Fantasy, #4 Winter 1983
- Review by Greg Costikyan (1983) in Ares, #14 Spring 1983
