= The Mists of Avalon =

1982 novel by Marion Zimmer Bradley

- Cover of the American first edition
- Author: Marion Zimmer Bradley
- Audio read by: Davina Porter
- Cover artist: Braldt Bralds
- Language: English
- Series: Avalon
- Genre: Historical fantasy
- Publisher: Alfred A. Knopf
- Publication date: January 1983
- Publication place: United States
- Media type: Print (hardcover and paperback) and audio-CD
- Pages: 876
- Award: Locus Award for Best Fantasy Novel (1984)
- ISBN: 0-394-52406-3
- OCLC: 8473972
- Dewey Decimal: 813/.54 19
- LC Class: PS3552.R228 M5 1982
- Followed by: The Forest House

The Mists of Avalon is a 1983 historical fantasy novel by American writer Marion Zimmer Bradley, in which the author relates the Arthurian legends from the perspective of the female characters. The book follows the trajectory of Morgaine (Morgan le Fay), a priestess fighting to save her Celtic religion in a country where Christianity threatens to destroy the pagan way of life. The epic is focused on the lives of Morgaine, Gwenhwyfar (Guinevere), Viviane, Morgause, Igraine and other women of the Arthurian legend.

The Mists of Avalon is in stark contrast to most other retellings of the Arthurian tales, which consistently cast Morgan le Fay as a distant, one-dimensional evil sorceress, with little or no explanation given for her antagonism to the Round Table. In this case, Morgaine is presented as a woman with unique gifts and responsibilities at a time of enormous political and spiritual upheaval who is called upon to defend her indigenous heritage against impossible odds.

The story is told in four large parts: "Book One: Mistress of Magic"; "Book Two: The High Queen"; "Book Three: The King Stag"; and "Book Four: The Prisoner in the Oak". The novel was a best-seller upon its publication and remains popular to this day. Bradley and Diana L. Paxson later expanded the book into the Avalon series.

== Plot ==
Igraine, younger half-sister of Vivian and older sister to Morgause, is married at fifteen to the much older Duke Gorlois of Cornwall and gives birth to Morgaine. Igraine later marries king Uther Pendragon after Gorlois dies in battle against Uther. Before Igraine knew of Gorlois's death, Uther consulted with Merlin, who used magic to make Uther appear as Gorlois and thus gained access to Igraine at Tintagel, conceiving Arthur. Morgaine witnesses Uther's accession to Caerleon's throne after his predecessor, Ambrosius, dies of old age.

When Morgaine is eleven years old and Arthur six, there is an attempt to murder Arthur. Their aunt, the high priestess Viviane, arrives in Caerleon and advises Uther to have Arthur fostered far away from the court for his own safety. Uther agrees, and also allows Viviane to take Morgaine to Avalon, where she is trained as a priestess of the Mother Goddess. During this period, Morgaine becomes aware of the rising tension between the old Pagan and the new Christian religions. After seven years of training, Morgaine is initiated as a priestess of the Mother, and Viviane begins priming her as the next Lady of Avalon.

When Vivian's son Lancelet visits Avalon, Morgaine falls in love with him, but her happiness is cut short when they discover Gwenhwyfar lost in the mist and Lancelet is smitten with her beauty.

Months after her initiation, Morgaine is given in a fertility rite to the future High King of Britain. Their union is not meant to be personal, but rather a symbolic wedding between the king and the land he is to defend. They engage in ritual sex, each unknowing of the other's actual identity. The following morning they talk and, after recognizing each other as Morgaine and Arthur, are horrified to realize what they have done. Two months later, Morgaine is devastated to find that she is pregnant.

After Uther dies fighting the Saxon invaders, Arthur claims the throne of Britain despite rumors about whether his father was Gorlois or Uther. Arthur must now defend Britain against the Saxons; Viviane gives him the sacred sword Excalibur and has Morgaine make him an enchanted scabbard that will prevent him from losing blood. With the combined forces of Avalon and Caerleon, Arthur repels the invaders, brings peace to the land, and marries Gwenhwyfar.

As Morgaine's unborn child grows within her, so do her feelings of anger and betrayal toward Viviane, whom she believes tricked her into bearing a child to Arthur for her own purposes. After considering abortion and briefly wandering into the realm of the fairies, she leaves Avalon for the court of her aunt Morgause, Queen of Lothian, where she gives birth to her son, naming him Gwydion. Morgause, spurred by her own and her husband Lot's ambition, tricks Morgaine into allowing her to rear Gwydion. Morgause uses magic to learn who his father is but promises secrecy to Morgaine. To escape Lot's unwanted advances, Morgaine leaves Lothian and returns to Arthur's court as a lady-in-waiting to Queen Gwenhwyfar. Morgaine does not see her son again until he is grown and a druid priest of Avalon.

When Gwenhwyfar fails to produce an heir, she is convinced that God is punishing her for her sins. She considers her greatest sins to be her failure to persuade Arthur to outlaw pagan religious practice in Britain and her forbidden love for Galahad, Arthur's cousin and finest knight, also known as Lancelet. Although Lancelet reciprocates Gwenhwyfar's love, he is also Arthur's closest friend and an honorable man. This situation causes suffering to both Lancelet and Gwenhwyfar.

On the eve of a decisive battle against the Saxons, Gwenhwyfar prevails upon Arthur to put aside Uther's Pendragon banner and replace it with her own Christian banner. As her religious fanaticism grows, relations between Avalon and Caerleon grow strained. Still, in her desperation over her failure to carry a child to term, Gwenhwyfar asks Morgaine for help, threatening to have an extramarital affair so she can become pregnant. In an attempt to keep Gwenhwyfar from doing so, Morgaine reveals to Gwenhwyfar that Arthur already has a son, though he does not know it; not telling her that she is the mother. Later, Arthur asks Lancelet to join him and his wife in his bed to conceive a child, and to satisfy the suffering of both Gwenhwyfar and Lancelet, stating that the child would be conceived on his bed and raised as his own. Lancelet at first refuses, but is finally convinced; however, no child is conceived even from this.

After the battle, Arthur moves his court to Camelot, which is more easily defended than Caerleon. Seeking to free both Lancelet and Gwenhwyfar from the forbidden love that traps them both, Morgaine tricks Lancelet into marrying Gwenhwyfar's cousin, Elaine, angering Gwenhwyfar. Later, during a dispute with Arthur over their lack of an heir, Gwenhwyfar breaks Morgaine's confidence and tells Arthur of Gwydion, then realizes Morgaine is his mother and Gwydion the child of incest. Arthur summons Morgaine and orders her to tell the truth, and she obeys. Gwenhwyfar, now believing that the lack of a royal heir is God's punishment for Arthur's union, however unwitting, with his half-sister Morgaine, urges Arthur to confess the encounter to the bishop, who imposes strict penance upon him. Then she and Arthur arrange for Morgaine to marry into Wales, far from Camelot. But because of a misunderstanding, Morgaine, who thought she would be marrying the king's younger son Accolon, a druid priest of Avalon and warrior, finds herself betrothed to King Uriens of North Wales, who is old enough to be her grandfather.

Arthur yearns to meet Gwydion and perhaps foster him at Camelot, but each time he brings up the subject with Gwenhwyfar she refuses to discuss it. Meanwhile, Gwydion is taken by Viviane to Avalon.

Morgaine marries Uriens and moves to North Wales as its queen, and enjoys a good relationship with Uriens and his youngest son, Uwaine, whom she grows to think of as her own son. Years later, she begins an affair with her step-son Accolon. The "little people" of the hills, who keep to the old pagan ways, regard Accolon and Morgaine as their spiritual king and queen. Uriens suspects nothing, but Accolon's older brother Avalloch does become suspicious; he eventually tries to blackmail Morgaine into sleeping with him as well. Morgaine sends Avalloch out on a boar hunt and he is killed by the boar, apparently through Morgaine's magic.

Gwydion, now grown, goes to the Saxon courts to learn warfare far from Arthur's eye. Impressed by his cleverness, the Saxons name him Mordred ("Evil Counsel"). Years later, at a Pentecost feast at Camelot, he introduces himself as Queen Morgaine's son and Queen Morgause's foster son, though he calls Queen Morgause "Mother" and Morgaine by her name. Because of his resemblance to his older relative, Lancelet, he must often tell people that Lancelet is not his father, but cannot say who his father is due to the shame of incest. To earn his knighthood with no suspicion of preferential treatment, Gwydion challenges Lancelet to single combat during a tourney and they fight. Gwenhwyfar, who has warmed to Gwydion, protests and Arthur interrupts the match. Lancelet makes Gwydion a knight of the Round Table, naming him Mordred.

Morgaine tells Accolon, who is now Uriens's heir, of the sacred marriage she made with Arthur years before. She convinces him that they must take the kingdom back from Arthur and the Christians and bring it back under the sway of Avalon. Morgaine discovers she is pregnant and is not sure if the child is Uriens' or Accolon's, but has an abortion because she is too old to give birth safely. The attempted coup fails and Arthur kills Accolon in single combat, sending a warning to Morgaine. As Uriens recovers from the shock of losing a second son and his wife's betrayal, Morgaine leaves Wales forever and returns to Avalon.

Years later, the Sacred Regalia of Avalon, a spear, a dish, and a cup, are stolen and presented to the Christian church in Camelot as an offering. Morgaine returns to Camelot with the priestess Raven during the Pentecost festival disguised as peasants. At the start of the holy rites, enraged and wielding great magic, Morgaine invokes the Great Mother Goddess to retrieve the regalia. The assembled court sees the manifestation of this magic as the revelation of the Holy Grail, which disappears as Raven collapses and dies.

When the knights of the Round Table leave to search for the Holy Grail, which drives Lancelet insane and results in the deaths of others, Mordred attempts to usurp the throne. The armies of Arthur and Mordred eventually fight but in the end, Mordred dies and Arthur is mortally wounded, Morgaine having earlier taken the magical scabbard. Morgaine takes the dying Arthur through the mists to Avalon, reassuring him that he did not fail in his attempt to save Britain from the approaching dark times. Arthur dies as the shoreline comes into view. Morgaine buries him in Avalon and remains there to tell the tale of Camelot.

== Characters ==
- Morgaine — Narrator, protagonist. Her character is capable of second sight (a gift of her Goddess) and transfiguration. She is the daughter of Gorlois and Igraine and the half-sister of Arthur. She is of notable status in the eyes of the old tribes of Britain and the post Roman aristocracy, being both High Priestess of Avalon and Duchess of Cornwall in her own right. Portrayed as a tragic character, Morgaine is torn between her loyalty to Avalon and her unfulfilled love for Lancelet, although she has other lovers in the book, notably Arthur, Kevin, and Accolon. Like Arthur, she is extremely charismatic. She often considers herself the victim of fate, having no choice in the decisions she makes in life. She is doomed to witness the demise of the old ways of Avalon, but in the end makes peace with certain aspects of Christianity, as she sees that she never fought the religion itself, but rather the narrow-minded views of some of its priests. She concludes that some memory of the ancient beliefs of Britain will live on, feeling that the Goddess she worshipped did not die with the coming of Christianity: rather, the Goddess just took another form in the image of the Virgin Mary.
- Uther Pendragon is the nephew and War Duke of the dead High King Ambrosius and an ambitious warlord who falls in love with Igraine. After being betrayed by his ally Gorlois (out of jealousy rather than for political reasons), he killed him and became the High King of Britain. He fathered King Arthur and died when Arthur was in his teens. Uther is portrayed as a gifted warlord and a competent ruler. He resents and respects Vivianne for the manipulations and for forcing him to keep his vow to Avalon with threatened rebellion.
- Igraine is the wife in turn to Gorlois and Uther, the younger sister of Viviane, older sister of Morgause, and mother of Morgaine and Arthur. Originally named "Grainné, for the Goddess of the Beltane fires", Igraine was brought up in Avalon and married at the age of fifteen to Duke Gorlois of Cornwall, a mostly unhappy union for her. She is destined by Viviane and Taliesin to betray her husband, seduce Uther and produce the saviour of the Island of Britain (her son King Arthur). At first, she rebels, stating she is not a breeding mare, but ultimately falls in love with Uther and helps him defeat his enemies. However, the guilt about Gorlois torments her to the end. Igraine adores Morgaine before Uther enters, but she then ignores Morgaine when she and Uther marry and when Arthur is born. Igraine is described by many as stunningly beautiful, and her beauty is still remembered in Britain long after her death.
- Gorlois, Duke of Cornwall, is Igraine's husband and Morgaine's father. Because Igraine was so young when they married, their relationship has been strained, but Gorlois did his best to make her feel comfortable, giving her gifts and letting her keep her daughter Morgaine. Igraine does not see how he loved her until it is too late. When Gorlois suspects that Igraine has had an affair with Uther, he turns on her, accuses her of being a whore and a witch, and breaks his oath to Uther. In the end, Uther kills him for his treachery.
- King Arthur is the son of Igraine and Uther and younger half-brother to Morgaine. He is portrayed as an able battle commander with a brilliant political mind. He is also able to inspire fanatical love and devotion among his friends and followers. He marries Gwenhwyfar by arranged marriage for a dowry of men and fine horses, but tries to truly honor and respect her. His compassion for his suffering wife — who is tormented by her childlessness and her love for Lancelet — ultimately becomes his downfall. A twist is that he is actually aware of Gwenhwyfar and Lancelet's affair, and how unhappy both are to continually betray him, but looks the other way because he loves both his wife and his best friend too much to make them unhappy. It is suggested that, while he does love Gwenhwyfar, his deepest love is saved for Morgaine.
- Gwenhwyfar is Arthur's beautiful but unhappy wife. Her mother died early in her life and she is raised in a convent and has a cold, unloving father, which left her with a deep inferiority complex and intense agoraphobia. Failing to produce an heir and unable to be with the love of her life, Lancelet, she falls into a deep depression and — hoping for salvation — becomes an increasingly fanatical Christian. Gwenhwyfar and Morgaine are depicted as polar opposites, similar only in their religious zealotry and desire to push Arthur towards their own ends. While Morgaine is at court, the two form an unlikely, yet genuinely affectionate friendship for several years. Several characters remark that Gwen is much more intelligent than she lets on. She is portrayed as a masterful housekeeper and performs the ceremonial role of high queen well.
- Lancelet is Arthur's First Knight and cousin, Viviane's son (by Ban of Benwick), and Morgaine's cousin and first love. He is an extremely gifted and handsome warrior, but has a lifelong fear of his mother. He and Gwenhwyfar are utterly infatuated, but neither has the courage (or ruthlessness) to elope. He also loves his cousin Arthur, and perhaps loves Gwenhwyfar even more because she is so close to him. He is conflicted because of his bisexuality and his infatuation with both Arthur and Gwenhwyfar.
- Mordred, a.k.a. Gwydion, is the illegitimate son of Morgaine and King Arthur. He is an unscrupulous, cunning intrigant, but in contrast to mainstream versions his motives are understandable. He sees his father Arthur as corrupt and decadent, and is convinced that he has to remove him to save Camelot. It is strongly hinted that his childhood under the cold, cunning Morgause makes him think the way he does. Mordred does share one notable trait with his mother Morgaine: he truly believes that he is a pawn of fate, with no real free will to choose his path in life. This is possibly due to the influence of the fatalistic Saxons. At one point, Mordred even lists his father's good qualities and admits that he admires Arthur in several ways. Nevertheless, Mordred remains committed to pulling his father down from the throne of Camelot. Like both his parents, Mordred is exceptionally charming. During his first stay in Camelot, he becomes greatly admired among peasant folk and nobility alike. He is also described as exceedingly handsome; a mirror image of his relative Lancelet as a young man. This leads many to assume he is a bastard son of Lancelet by Morgaine.
- Morgause is Morgaine's aunt, the younger sister of Viviane and Igraine. "Their mother, who had been too old for childbearing, had died giving birth to Morgause. Viviane had borne a child of her own, earlier in the year; her child had died, and Viviane had taken Morgause to nurse." She is depicted as a vain, cunning character and in contrast to her sisters, she acts purely for her own gains. She bears her sisters near lifelong resentment, Igraine for her beauty and her marriages to Gorlois and Uther, and Vivianne for choosing Igraine over her, as the linchpin in her plans for Britain. Despite her cheerful amorality, she seems to hold some true affection for Morgaine throughout the novel. She takes Morgaine in without asking any questions and treats her kindly. She seems to have had a genuinely happy marriage with Lot, who treated her as an equal and matched her in intelligence and cunning. She continues as the ruling queen of Lothian after Lot's death. She misses Lot long after he dies and thinks of him often. She feels no regret in her regular adultery after Lot's death and plans to use Mordred as a vehicle for her power. She seeks to be High Queen of Britain, in name or de facto, for most of the novel.
- Bishop Patricius (based on Saint Patrick) is Camelot's most powerful Christian priest who drove the "snakes" (druids) from Ireland. He is portrayed in an extremely negative light, as a ruthless, misogynist religious fundamentalist.
- Elaine is Gwenhwyfar's cousin who eventually becomes Lancelet's wife. Elaine greatly resembles her cousin Gwenhwyfar in looks (albeit not in personality), which plays into her plan to marry Lancelet under dishonest, non-consensual circumstances (rape by deception). Morgaine offers Lancelet to Elaine on the condition that she is given Elaine's first daughter to rear in Avalon. With Lancelet she has three children: Galahad, Nimue, and Gwenhwyfar (named after the queen). She is less passive than she lets on, and is able to successfully goad Morgaine into helping her marry Lancelet.
- Viviane is — for the most time — the High Priestess of Avalon. She is the older sister of Igraine and Morgause, mother of Balan and Lancelet, and the aunt of Morgaine, Arthur, Gawain and Gareth. She is portrayed as a strong religious and political leader; her fatal flaw is her willingness to use others in her quest to save Avalon without thinking of their emotional suffering. She is misunderstood because her family has little contact with her and that she would have to do anything to keep Camelot and Avalon and the priestesses of Avalon alive in everyone's hearts. Viviane is killed by her older son Balan's foster-brother, Balin.
- Taliesin (the Merlin of Britain) is the old Archdruid and harpist of Avalon. He is revered by Christians and pagans alike as a wise, kind old man. He fathered Igraine, Morgause and Niniane and is implied to have fathered Viviane as well. His mental health continually deteriorates throughout the story. (In this retelling, "Merlin" is a title rather than a proper name.)
- Kevin (Merlin of Britain) succeeds Taliesin after his death. He is a horribly disfigured hunchback, having been burned in a fire as a child, but can sing like an angel. He becomes Morgaine's lover for a while and later her worst enemy. Foreseeing the demise of pagan ways, he betrays Avalon. In an ultimate attempt to unite Christianity and Avalon, so Avalon will survive, he brings the Holy Grail to Camelot. To punish him for this atrocity, Morgaine sets up Nimue to seduce and then betray him, and wants to torture him to death as a traitor. But before the torture begins, Morgaine changes her mind and has him executed swiftly out of mercy, and at the same time, a bolt of lightning incinerates the Holy Oak of Avalon. Morgaine understands that Avalon is doomed.
- Raven is a priestess of Avalon who has taken a perpetual vow of silence. Another original character, she sacrifices herself to help Morgaine save the Holy Grail from Patricius.
- Accolon is a knight loyal to Avalon, the second son of Uriens, and Morgaine's lover. She wants him to kill King Arthur and so restore the power of Avalon; however, Arthur slays Accolon in direct combat, and Morgaine is disgraced when her role becomes evident.
- Avalloch is Uriens' eldest son. He intends to rule North Wales as a Christian king; upon discovering Morgaine and Accolon's affair, he threatens to expose her if she does not sleep with him as well. Morgaine kills him to preserve her reputation and put Accolon in position to inherit the throne from Uriens.
- Uwaine is Uriens' youngest son and a knight loyal to Arthur. He regards Morgaine as his mother.
- Nimue is the beautiful daughter of Elaine and Lancelet. As Viviane's granddaughter, she was to be Lady of the Lake when Morgaine dies. She is kept in constant seclusion at Avalon, and Morgaine sees her as the ultimate weapon against Camelot. Morgaine has Nimue seduce Kevin in order to abduct him, but instead falls in love with him and kills herself after she betrays him.
- Niniane is Taliesin's daughter, making her Igraine and Morgause's younger half-sister (and possible Viviane's as well). She is a priestess who reluctantly becomes Lady of the Lake after Viviane is slain, Morgaine having left Avalon while pregnant with Gwydion. Niniane is not as powerful or politically astute as Morgaine or Viviane, and painfully aware of her shortcomings as Lady of the Lake. She becomes Mordred's lover, but when he announces his plans to betray Arthur, Niniane turns on him and he kills her in a fit of rage (whether this is accidental or intentional is never specified).
- Gawaine is the eldest of the four sons of Lot and Morgause and one of Arthur's best Knights of the Round Table. He is known for being very kind, compassionate, and devoted to Arthur.
- Gareth is the youngest of the four sons of King Lot and Morgause and Knight of the Round Table. He is similar to Gawaine in both looks and personality, only more fearsome in battle. Lancelet is his childhood idol, although it is Lancelet who accidentally kills him.
- Galahad is Lancelet and Elaine's son (conceived when Elaine raped Lancelet through deception) and Arthur's heir to the throne. Mordred predicts that Galahad will not live to see his own crowning. Prediction proving true, Galahad dies on the quest for the Holy Grail.
- Cai is Arthur's foster-brother. After a near fatal accident as a small child, Arthur is sent to live with Cai and his father, Ectorius. Cai and Arthur love each other very much, and after Arthur is crowned, he tells Cai, "God strike me if I ever ask that you, brother, should call me [king]." Cai is described as having a facial scar and a limp, two injuries that he received while protecting Arthur during a Saxon invasion. Cai is made Arthur's knight and chamberlain, and he keeps Arthur's castle for him.

== Writing ==
Marion Zimmer Bradley stated about her book:

About the time I began work on the Morgan le Fay story that later became Mists, a religious search of many years culminated in my accepting ordination in one of the Gnostic Catholic churches as a priest. Since the appearance of the novel, many women have consulted me about this, feeling that the awareness of the Goddess has expanded their own religious consciousness, and ask me if it can be reconciled with Christianity. I do feel very strongly, not only that it can, but that it must... So when women today insist on speaking of Goddess rather than God, they are simply rejecting the old man with the white beard, who commanded the Hebrews to commit genocide on the Philistines and required his worshippers daily to thank God that He had not made them women... And, I suppose, a little, the purpose of the book was to express my dismay at the way in which religion lets itself become the slave of politics and the state. (Malory's problem ... that God may not be on the side of the right, but that organized religion always professes itself to be on the side of the bigger guns.) ... I think the neo-pagan movement offers a very viable alternative for people, especially for women, who have been turned off by the abuses of Judeo-Christian organized religions.

== Reception ==
The Mists of Avalon is lauded as one of the most original and emotional retellings of the familiar Arthurian legend. Bradley received much praise for her convincing portrayal of the main protagonists, respectful handling of the Pagan ways of Avalon and for telling a story in which there is neither black and white nor good and evil, but several truths. Isaac Asimov called it "the best retelling of the Arthurian Saga I have ever read", and Jean Auel noted "I loved this book so much I went out and bought it for a friend, and have told many people about it." The Encyclopedia of Science Fiction calls the book "a convincing revision of the Arthurian cycle," and said that the victory of Christianity over the "sane but dying paganism" of Avalon "ensures eons of repression for women and the vital principles they espouse." It won the 1984 Locus Award for Best Fantasy Novel and spent four months on the New York Times best seller list in hardcover. The trade paperback edition of Mists of Avalon has ranked among the top five trade paperbacks on the monthly Locus bestseller lists for almost four years.

John T. Sapienza, Jr. reviewed The Mists of Avalon for Different Worlds magazine and stated that "I do not know how accurately the author has depicted the Triple Goddess mythology or practices, although it seemed a reasonable version from my own limited knowledge of the subject. It is enough, I think, that it works for the purposes of giving meaning to the lives of the characters of the novel. And for giving some vivid contrasts to beliefs we take for granted in our own lives. It is very difficult for someone raised in a monotheistic religion to comprehend what it was like to believe in many different spirits and powers comprising nature."

== TV mini-series adaptation ==
The Mists of Avalon was adapted for television into a TNT miniseries in 2001, directed by Uli Edel.

== Extended series ==
Bradley, along with Diana L. Paxson, later expanded the book into a series, including The Fall of Atlantis, Ancestors of Avalon, Sword of Avalon, Ravens of Avalon, The Forest House, Lady of Avalon, and Priestess of Avalon. J.S. Morgane's The Spirituality of Avalon discusses the religious aspects of the Avalon series and gives insights into a modern Western understanding of spirituality and its construction in epic fantasy fiction.

== Release details ==
- 1983, United States, Knopf ISBN 0-394-52406-3, Pub Date January 1983, hardcover
- 1984, United States, Del Rey Fantasy (an imprint of Ballantine Publishing Group) ISBN 0-345-31452-2, Pub Date May 1984, trade paperback

== See also ==
- Morgan le Fay in modern culture
