= Cherry Wilder =

Pseudonym of Kiwi science fiction and fantasy writer Cherry Barbara Grimm, née Lockett

- Born: Cherry Barbara Lockett; September 3, 1930 Auckland, New Zealand
- Died: March 14, 2002 (aged 71) Wellington, New Zealand
- Genre: Science fiction and fantasy

Cherry Barbara Grimm (née Lockett, 3 September 1930 – 14 March 2002), better known by the pseudonym Cherry Wilder, was a New Zealand science fiction and fantasy writer.

== Biography ==
Born in Auckland, New Zealand, Lockett attended Nelson College for Girls in Nelson and the University of Canterbury in Christchurch before first moving to Australia and then, in 1976 to Langen, Hessen, Germany. She also lived in Wiesbaden-Bierstadt, before moving back to New Zealand in 1996. She chose the pseudonym "Cherry Wilder" when she began writing science fiction stories in 1974. She published 10 novels and over 50 short stories. She died 14 March 2002, in Wellington, New Zealand, at 71.

== Bibliography ==
=== Books ===
==== The Torin Trilogy ====
1. The Luck of Brin's Five (1977) – Won the 1978 Ditmar Award for Best Australian Science Fiction Novel
2. The Nearest Fire (1982)
3. The Tapestry Warriors (1987)

Several short stories are also set in the world of the Torin trilogy; not all are so marked in the list below.

==== The Rulers of Hylor series ====
1. A Princess of the Chameln (1984)
2. Yorath the Wolf (1984)
3. The Summer's King (1986)
4. The Wanderer (2004) with Katya Reimann, published posthumously. The Wanderer was to be the first in a new trilogy set in the world of the Rulers of Hylor trilogy.

==== Rhomary Land books ====
1. Second Nature (1986)
2. Signs of Life (1996)

=== Other books ===
- Cruel Designs (1988)
- Dealers in Light and Darkness (1995), a collection

=== Short fiction ===
- "The Ark of James Carlyle" (1974) – Nominated for the 1975 Ditmar Award for Best Australian Long Fiction
- "The Phobos Transcripts" (1975)
- "Way Out West" (1975) – Nominated for the 1976 Ditmar Award for Best Australian Long fiction
- "Double Summer Time" (1976)
- "The Remittance Man" (1976)
- "The Lodestar" (1977)
- "Point of Departure" (1977)
- "The Falldown of Man" (1978)
- "Mab Gallen Recalled" (1978) – Published in Millennial Women (1978)
- "Dealers in Light and Darkness" (1979)
- "A Long, Bright Day by the Sea of Utner" (1979)
- "Odd Man Search" (1979)
- "The Gingerbread House" (1980)
- "Gone to Earth" (1981)
- "The Dreamers of Deliverance" (1981)
- "Cabin Fever" (1983)
- "Kaleidoscope" (1983)
- "Something Coming Through" (1983)
- "The Ballad of Hilo Hill" (1985)
- "Dreamwood" (1986)
- "The Decline of Sunshine" (1987)
- "The House on Cemetery Street" (1988)
- "Anzac Day" (1989)
- "The Soul of a Poet" (1989)
- "Alive in Venice" (1990)
- "Old Noon's Tale" (1990)
- "A Woman's Ritual" (1990)
- "The Beta Syndrome" (1990)
- "Looking Forward to the Harvest" (1991)
- "Bird on a Time Branch" (1992)
- "Special Effects" (1993)
- "Willow Cottage" (1994)
- "Back of Beyond" (1995)
- "The Curse of Kali" (1996)
- "Dr. Tilmann's Consultant: A Scientific Romance" (1996)
- "Friends in Berlin" (1997)
- "The Ghost Hunters" (1997)
- "The Bernstein Room" (1998)
- "The Dancing Floor" (1998) in Dreaming Down-Under (ed. Jack Dann, Janeen Webb) (set in the world of the Torin trilogy)
- "Saturday" (2000)
- "Aotearoa" (2001)

=== Poetry ===
- "Legend" and "Prayer for a Wanderer", by Cherry Lockett, in Arachne

=== About Wilder ===
- Yvonne Rousseau's Minmers Marooned and Planet of the Marsupials: The Science-Fiction Novels of Cherry Wilder (1997) is the third in Nimrod's Babel Handbook series.

== See also ==
- New Zealand literature
