= Katya Reimann =

American writer of fantasy novels (born 1965)

Katya Reimann (born 1965) is an American writer of fantasy novels.

== Biography ==
Reimann is an author of high fantasy novels. Her debut novel, Wind from a Foreign Sky, is set in a world similar to the Dark Ages. She has cited her literary influences as T. H. White, 18th century writers, and Rene Goscinny.

Reimann has a PhD in 18th Century Literature from the University of Oxford, which she achieved in 1995 after six years of study and teaching in England. She also has a bachelor's degree from Yale University.

She lives in St. Paul, Minnesota.

== Bibliography ==
=== The Tielmaran Chronicles ===
1. Wind From a Foreign Sky (1996)
2. A Tremor in the Bitter Earth (1998)
3. Prince of Fire and Ashes (2002)

=== Rulers of Hylor ===
Upon the death of Cherry Wilder, Reimann completed the final book in the series:

- The Wanderer (2004)

== Nominations and awards ==
- John W. Campbell Award for Best New Writer (1997, nominated)
