= Arrowhead (science fiction venue) =

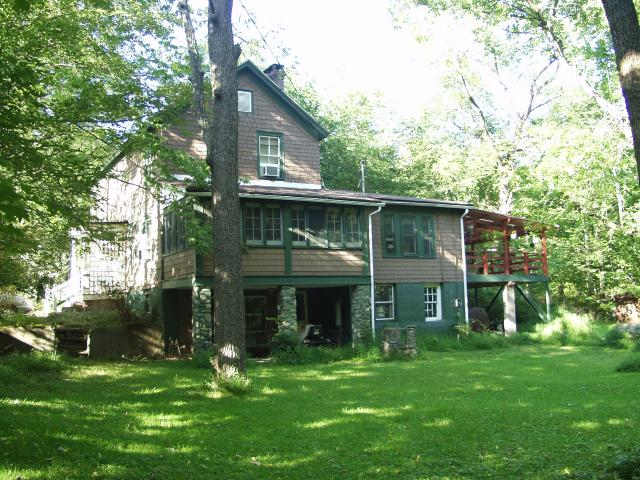
Arrowhead, August 2004

Arrowhead is the name that science fiction writer James Blish and his wife, literary agent and science fiction writer Virginia Kidd, gave to their home in Milford, Pennsylvania. The Virginia Kidd Literary Agency has been operating continuously at Arrowhead since 1965.

Arrowhead has been a focal point for science fiction writers for over fifty years. Science Fiction and Fantasy Writers of America (SFWA) was partially conceived at Arrowhead, and hundreds of gatherings of science fiction writers who were later prominent SFWA members were hosted there.

== History ==
The history of Arrowhead is nothing if not colorful. The grounds and building were seriously flooded in 1955 by the remains of Hurricane Diane and then again in 2004 as a consequence of the deluges that accompanied the profoundly busy hurricane season that year. Each time, reconstruction and retrenchment followed; the building is manifestly sturdy, the oldest portions dating back to the 18th century.

Writers and others were welcomed during the sixties and Arrowhead took on many aspects of a commune, though it is probably more fair to describe it as a "crash-pad". Damon Knight, Kate Wilhelm, Thomas M. Disch, Judith Merril, Lester del Rey, Anne McCaffrey, Arthur C. Clarke, Frederik Pohl and many, many more made the afternoons and evenings at Arrowhead merry and stimulating.

There were sleeping bags on the expansive porches, bleary-eyed writer-folk sitting around the kitchen table come morning (or afternoon...) and many a story idea was expounded, dissected, and fleshed out. Folk (and Filk) songs were sung, guitars and an upright piano backed decidedly non-professional voices who made up in enthusiasm for what they lacked in technique. Rock bands practiced and jammed in Arrowhead's basement studio space during the 1970s. One alumnus of these sessions, Damon Knight's son Christopher, went on to found the Los Angeles Recording Workshop (see External links, below), one of the largest and most elaborate recording instruction facilities in the world.

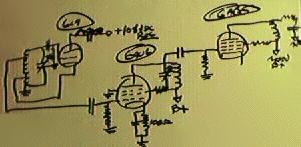
Arrowhead medicine chest door obverse

At one point during the early 1970s, the downstairs bathroom received a small graffito from James Blish and Virginia Kidd's son, Ben. Instead of the cleaning and reprimand that one might reasonably expect, within a year, the entire bathroom had been covered floor to ceiling by remarks from eminent science fiction writers, agents, and not a few fans. The walls, the ceiling, the shower stall, even the sides of the bathtub did not escape from the onslaught of writers who found a tabula rasa, no matter if it was only a tiny clear space. Sadly, these were removed in the 1990s. Only one graffito escaped the purge, and still remains as of 2005; an electronic diagram for the RF output stage of a pirate AM radio station on the back of the bathroom medicine cabinet door. This station operated during the 1970s, broadcasting progressive rock and social commentary to the local area. Instructions have been given by the owners of the Virginia Kidd Literary Agency that this last graffito never be removed or painted over, and that the cabinet itself be retrieved in the event that the agency move to new quarters.

== US government ownership ==
In the 1970s, the US government proposed a building a dam across the Delaware River that would have flooded the area into a large reservoir lake. The controversial Tocks Island Dam project would have flooded the location of Arrowhead. Virginia Kidd was forced to sell the building to the government, but was able to negotiate an agreement whereby she could remain there until the dam was completed and the property actually in danger of flooding. Subsequently, the Tocks Island Dam project was never completed, the US park service obtained jurisdiction over all the properties that had been purchased for the project, and although Virginia died, her literary agency remains there to this day under a new lease.
