= Lady of Avalon =

1997 novel by Marion Zimmer Bradley

- First edition
- Author: Marion Zimmer Bradley and Diana L. Paxson
- Cover artist: John Jude Palencar
- Language: English
- Series: Avalon Series
- Genre: Fantasy, Historical
- Publisher: Viking Press
- Publication date: November 6, 1997
- Publication place: United States
- Media type: Print (Hardcover and Paperback) and audio-CD
- Pages: 464 pp
- ISBN: 0-670-85783-1
- OCLC: 36008595
- Dewey Decimal: 813/.54 21
- LC Class: PS3552.R228 L27 1997
- Preceded by: The Forest House
- Followed by: Priestess of Avalon

Lady of Avalon is a 1997 historical fantasy novel by American writers Marion Zimmer Bradley and Diana L. Paxson. It is the sequel to The Forest House and the prequel to The Mists of Avalon.

== Plot ==
The novel is divided into 3 parts.

=== Part 1 ===
The first part shows the reader Caillean and Gawen (Eilan's son), whom the audience knows from the prequel, The Forest House.

Caillean assumes the role of High Priestess of Avalon and becomes foster mother to Gawen who, though raised as a Druid, receives lessons from the Fairy Queen. The queen, who has a half-mortal daughter, Sianna, arranges with Caillean that Sianna will study at Avalon. As Sianna and Gawen grow, they develop a special bond. At one point Gawen, in the throes of an identity crisis, seeks his Roman grandfather Macellius, who enables him to join the Roman army. Gawen spends several months in training with the Romans. Separated from his unit during his first battle, he makes his way back to Avalon, at one point with supernatural assistance. Shortly after his return, he and Sianna marry in the ritual of Avalon. Gawen is killed the day after their wedding as he tries to protect Avalon from the Christians, who were formerly tolerant of the Druids but now have a fanatical leader, and a Roman patrol sent to find him and bring him back for punishment as a deserter. After Gawen's death and Avalon's discovery by the Roman patrol, Caillean hides Avalon in the mists, making it accessible only to those who have the proper training to penetrate them.

When Caillean grows old, Sianna succeeds her as High Priestess. Her daughter by Gawen succeeds her in turn, making Sianna the matriarch of a line of High Priestesses.

=== Part 2 ===
The second part tells the audience about High Priestess Dierna. She takes in a new novice named Teleri, a foreign princess who hopes to become a great priestess. When Dierna receives a vision about the new Protector of Britannia, a Roman admiral named Carausius, she forces Teleri into marriage with him. Some years later, Carausius encounters opposition. Teleri leaves him and supports the bid of one of his former officers, Allectus, to become the new High King. Dierna and Carausius have a brief affair. Allectus pursues and wounds Carausius, who tries to reach the safety of Avalon and Dierna but fails, dying of his wounds at the edge of the lake of Avalon. Teleri marries Allectus but shortly afterward, Teleri leaves Allectus and finds her way back to Avalon, where she is reunited with Dierna, completes her training and eventually becomes her successor.

=== Part 3 ===
This part opens as the High Priestess Ana sends the Druid bard Taliesin to escort her third daughter, Viviane, to Avalon. Viviane had been fostered on a farm, but when she is fourteen years old, her mother recalls her to Avalon to take the place of her two older sisters, who had died. Since Viviane's strong temperament is similar to her mother's, the two often clash. Viviane completes her training as a priestess, but Ana refuses to allow her initiation, forcing Viviane to remain a novice—and a virgin—for much longer than usual. Although Viviane chafes at what she considers to be an unjust restriction, her virgin state enables her to become the first woman in centuries to handle the Holy Grail, which is kept by Taliesin's order of Druids. During this time, Ana has another daughter, Igraine. Finally, Viviane is initiated when she becomes the lover of the British chief Vortimer. When Vortimer dies, Viviane returns to Avalon carrying his child, a daughter who lives only three months. Meanwhile, Ana has become pregnant again, but is too old to give birth safely. She and Viviane forgive each other as they await the birth. Ana dies in childbirth, but the baby, Morgause, survives. Viviane, whose breasts are still producing milk, becomes wet-nurse and foster-mother to her sister.

The end of the book leads to the storyline of The Mists of Avalon.

== Release details ==
- 1997, USA, Penguin Putnam Inc. ISBN 0-451-45652-1, Pub date June 1998, Paperback

== Reception ==
The novel received a mixed reception, and was less successful than The Mists of Avalon. Publishers Weekly called Lady of Avalon a "splendid" prequel that "combines romance, rich historical detail, magical dazzlements, grand adventure and feminist sentiments into the kind of novel [Bradley's] fans have been yearning for."
