= Avalon Series =

Fantasy novel series by Marion Zimmer Bradley and Diana L. Paxson

- Author: Marion Zimmer Bradley, Diana L. Paxson
- Country: United States
- Language: English
- Genre: Fantasy

The Avalon Series is a series of fantasy novels written by Marion Zimmer Bradley and Diana L. Paxson. Paxson took over sole authorship after Bradley's death in 1999. The series focuses on the legendary island of Avalon and the various women who have shaped its history and that of Britain.

== Overview ==
The Avalon series retells the Matter of Britain from the point of view of the women behind the throne. Through a set of stories that spans several centuries, it tells of how the mystic isle of Avalon was created, its history, life in Britain under Roman authority, and how Avalon and its ancient traditions faded from the world because of a new religion, Christianity. All stories are told by women who were powerful during their lifetime, such as Eilan, High Priestess of the Forest House, Helena, mother of the Roman Emperor Constantine, and Morgaine, High Priestess of Avalon (later remembered as the sorceress Morgan le Fay).

The series explores the King Arthur story and related legends through a feminist lens, as well as incorporating historical figures and events, elements of Celtic paganism, and modern paganism traditions. The ideological conflict of the pagan and Christian characters, as well as the belief that there is wisdom to be found in both traditions, are frequent themes of the series.

The novels are connected via Avalon itself and the implication (strongly hinted at, though rarely outright stated) that several characters throughout the series are the same souls reincarnated.

== Bradley's Avalon ==
First established in The Mists of Avalon, the series' version of the legendary island is notably different from other depictions, though it draws from and expands earlier legends. As in Geoffrey of Monmouth, Avalon is ruled by an order of women, explicitly identified by Bradley with the pre-Christian Brythonic religion. Drawing from legends that associate Avalon with the town of Glastonbury in Somerset, England, Bradley establishes her Avalon as a parallel universe of sorts to Glastonbury, co-existing in the same area but accessible only by summoning a magical mist.

Avalon's ruler, the Lady of the Lake (a figure featured in several Arthurian stories), is identified as a High Priestess in the series. As multiple names are assigned to this character in legend, Bradley's Lady is a title passed from one generation to the next. All the Arthurian Ladies of the Lake (Viviane, Niniane, Nimue, etc.) are established as separate characters in the novels and original characters are added to the office's history. Bradley takes a similar approach to the character of Merlin, here cast as a series of Arch-Druids.

The central figure of Avalon's religion is the Mother Goddess, a name Bradley associates with several Celtic deities. The author was influenced by traditions of neo-paganism (which Bradley herself once practiced) that conflate or associate similar pagan deities and emphasize a matriarchal religious structure.

== Connection to other works ==
The Avalon series is set in the same universe as Bradley's earlier novel, The Fall of Atlantis, originally published as the novellas Web of Light and Web of Darkness. The pagan religious order of priests and priestesses in this novel influences the later conception of Avalon. Several characters in the story, including the sisters Domaris and Deoris and their children Micail and Tiriki, are implied to have been reincarnated as later characters in the Avalon series. More overt connections are established by Diana L. Paxson, who continued the history of the surviving Atlanteans in Ancestors of Avalon and referenced their deities in Sword of Avalon.

== Novels ==
=== The Mists of Avalon ===
The original novel which inspired the series, The Mists of Avalon (1983) is set in Sub-Roman Britain. It focuses primarily on Morgaine, half-sister to King Arthur and priestess of Avalon. Morgaine's desire to preserve the matriarchal pagan religion of her people leads her to develop an enmity for Christianity, a newly rising power in Britain, and to come into conflict with her brother. In addition to Morgaine's story, the novel focuses on other Arthurian women, including Arthur's mother Igraine, Viviane, the High Priestess of Avalon, and Arthur's queen, Gwenhwyfar, whose Christian piety leads to further conflict with Morgaine.

=== The Forest House ===
Set in the first century CE during Roman occupation of Britain, The Forest House (1993) focuses on the pagan religious order which predated the founding of Avalon. Based on the opera Norma, it tells of the romance between Eilan, a British priestess, and Gaius, a Roman soldier. The Forest House was co-written by Marion Zimmer Bradley and Diana L. Paxson, with the latter uncredited.

=== Lady of Avalon ===
Structured as a series of short stories, Lady of Avalon (1997) features several distinct episodes in the history of Avalon and the women who have served as its High Priestess. Among these are the stories of Caillean, the High Priestess who casts the spell that conceals Avalon in mist, Dierna, who arranges a marriage between a British princess and a Roman officer in an effort to secure peace, and Viviane, a character from the original novel. Paxson again shared co-writing duties but was uncredited.

=== Priestess of Avalon ===
Set in the third century, Priestess of Avalon (2000) adapts a legend which ties the historical figure of Empress Helena to the island of Britain. It tells of Helena (or Eilan)'s romance with Roman officer Constantius and the birth of their son Constantine, who is destined to become Emperor. Priestess was begun by Bradley and completed by Paxson following Bradley's death.

=== Ancestors of Avalon ===
In the story chronology the earliest book of the series, Ancestors of Avalon (2004) tells of a group of refugees from the lost continent of Atlantis who settle in Britain. They found the area known in later centuries as both Glastonbury and Avalon and are involved in the creation of Stonehenge. This was the first volume of the series written by Paxson alone, though it draws elements from Bradley's earlier novel, The Fall of Atlantis (1987), bringing it officially into the chronology of the Avalon series. All subsequent books of the series are by Paxson.

=== Ravens of Avalon ===
Taking place prior to The Forest House, Ravens of Avalon (2007) adapts the story of the historical Celtic warrior-queen Boudica of the Iceni tribe, who resists the rule of Britain by the forces of Rome. Vowing vengeance for the invaders' violent rape of her daughters, Boudica raises an army and calls upon the Goddess in her fearsome warrior aspect.

=== Sword of Avalon ===
Set in the Bronze Age, Sword of Avalon (2009) focuses on the forging of Excalibur and its early history. Mikantor, the "Son of a Hundred Kings" and rightful ruler of the British tribes, is sold into slavery while the cruel warlord Galid usurps control of the land. Avalon's Lady, Anderle, opposes him. Mikantor has adventures in ancient Greece and throughout Europe before returning to claim his destiny.

== Series order ==
The books of the Avalon series encompass several centuries of ancient British history but were not published in sequence. Each volume tells a story set in a different historical era.

=== Publication order ===
- The Mists of Avalon (1983) (illustrated by Braldt Bralds)
  - Mistress of Magic (audiobook edition of The Mists of Avalon, part 1) (1994)
  - The High Queen (audiobook edition of The Mists of Avalon, part 2) (1994)
  - The King Stag (audiobook edition of The Mists of Avalon, part 3) (1994)
  - The Prisoner in the Oak (audiobook edition of The Mists of Avalon, part 4) (1994)
- The Forest House (1993) (now also known as The Forests of Avalon) (with Diana L. Paxson)
- Lady of Avalon (1997) (with Diana L. Paxson)
- Priestess of Avalon (2000) (with Diana L. Paxson)
- Ancestors of Avalon (2004) (written by Diana L. Paxson)
- Ravens of Avalon (2007) (written by Diana L. Paxson)
- Sword of Avalon (2009) (written by Diana L. Paxson)

=== In-universe chronological order ===
1. The Fall of Atlantis
2. Ancestors of Avalon
3. Sword of Avalon
4. Ravens of Avalon
5. The Forest House
6. Lady of Avalon
7. Priestess of Avalon
8. The Mists of Avalon

== Main characters ==
=== The Mists of Avalon ===
- Morgaine - Protagonist; Priestess and later High-Priestress of Avalon, half-sister of Arthur
- Gwenhwyfar - Arthur's queen
- Igraine - Wife of Uther, mother of Arthur and Morgaine, half sister to Morgause and Viviane
- Viviane - High Priestess of Avalon, Lady of the Lake, half sister to Igraine and Morgause
- Taliesin, the Merlin of Britain - Arch-Druid and Bard
- Morgause - sister of Igraine and aunt of Morgaine and of Arthur
- Uther Pendragon - Husband of Igraine, briefly High King of Britain
- King Arthur - High King of Britain
- Lancelot - Arthur's best friend and finest warrior, son of Viviane
- Mordred - Son of Morgaine and Arthur
- Kevin Harper - the Merlin of Britain; Taliesin's successor, traitor to Avalon and the Mysteries

=== The Forest House ===
- Caillean - Priestess at the Forest House
- Eilan - Priestess, later Lady of the Forest House after Lhiannon's death
- Gaius - Roman soldier and lover of Eilan
- Ardanos - Arch-Druid of Britannia
- Cynric - Adoptive brother of Eilan
- Dieda - Cousin of Eilan, priestess at the Forest House
- Lhiannon - Lady of the Forest House

=== Lady of Avalon ===
Part I

- Caillean - High Priestess of Avalon
- Gawen - Son of Eilan and Gaius
- Sianna - Daughter of the Faerie Queen
- Joseph of Arimathea - Leader of the Christians of Inis Witrin
- Paulus - Joseph's successor

Part II

- Dierna - High Priestess of Avalon
- Allectus - A Roman officer
- Carausius - A Roman commander
- Teleri - Princess training as a priestess of Avalon

Part III

- Viviane - Future High Priestess
- Ana - High Priestess of Avalon, mother of Viviane, Igraine, and Morgause
- Vortimer - Son of the High King Vortigern

=== Priestess of Avalon ===
- Eilan (Julia Coelia Helena) – Daughter of Prince Coelius, consort of Constantius, mother of Constantine, and priestess of Avalon
- Constantius – The Roman noble she marries
- Constantine – Helena's son, Emperor AD 306-37
- Crispus – Constantine's illegitimate son by Minervina
- Dierna – Helena's second cousin, later Lady of Avalon
- Fausta – Daughter of Maximian, wife of Constantine, and mother of his legitimate children
- Ganeda – Helena's aunt, Lady of Avalon
- Helena the Younger ("Lena") – A noblewomen of Treveri, wife of Crispus
- Maxentius - Son of Maximian, Augustus in Italy and North Africa
- Minervina - Constantine's Syrian concubine, mother of Crispus
- Quintillus - Brother of the Emperor Claudius II, Constantius's great uncle
- Severus - Caesar appointed by Galerius, executed by Maximian
- Victorinus - Rebel Emperor in the West, AD 268-70

=== Ancestors of Avalon ===
- Damisa - Eldest of the acolytes of Atlantis
- Tiriki - Guardian of the Temple of Light, temple name "Eilantha", future priestess of Avalon
- Micail - Prince of Ahtarrath, husband of Tiriki
- Chedan - An acolyte of the Ancient Land before its fall
- Tjalan - Prince of Alkonath, cousin of Micail
- Deoris - Temple name "Adsartha", mother of Tiriki, wife of Reio-ta, Aunt of Micail
- Domaris - Temple name "Isarma", mother of Micail, sister of Deoris
- Micon - Prince of Ahtarrah, father of Micail, brother of Reio-ta
- Reio-ta - Husband of Deoris, Uncle of Micail, step-father to Tiriki

=== Ravens of Avalon ===
- Boudica - Celtic warrior queen who rebels against the Romans
- Prasutagos - Boudica's husband, king of the Iceni
- Lhiannon - Priestess of Mona and Boudica's friend
- Ardanos - Druid of Mona
- Caratac - British chieftain who resists Roman rule

=== Sword of Avalon ===
- Anderle - Lady of Avalon
- Galid - A warlord who usurps the rule of Britain
- Mikantor - a.k.a. Woodpecker; Rightful king kidnapped and sold into slavery
- Tirilan - Anderle's daughter, who loves Mikantor but chooses priestesshood
- Velantos - An Achaean smith destined to forge a legendary sword
