= Ancestors of Avalon =

2004 novel by Diana L. Paxson

- Author: Marion Zimmer Bradley (completed by Diana L. Paxson)
- Cover artist: Dominic Harman
- Language: English
- Series: Avalon Series
- Genre: Fantasy, Historical
- Publisher: Penguin Books
- Publication date: June 2004
- Publication place: United States
- Media type: Print (hardback & paperback)
- Pages: 363 pp
- ISBN: 0-670-03314-6
- OCLC: 55095381
- Dewey Decimal: 813/.54 22
- LC Class: PS3566.A897 M33 2004
- Preceded by: Priestess of Avalon
- Followed by: Ravens of Avalon

Ancestors of Avalon is a 2004 historical fantasy novel by American writer Diana L. Paxson, based on an idea of Marion Zimmer Bradley.

The book is one of 7 prequels to Bradley's fantasy novel Mists of Avalon. The characters of Ancestors of Avalon have appeared earlier in Bradley's fantasy novel The Fall of Atlantis. Ancestors of Avalon is the missing link to the implied connection to the mythical Atlantis in Bradley's Avalon-series.

== Plot summary ==
2500 years BC, Tiriki, Priestess of Light and of the Earth-goddess Ni-Terat, and her husband Micail, Priest of Light and Prince of the Atlantean state Atharrath, have to save themselves from the destruction of Atlantis and are forced to board different ships to the Isles of Tin (Britain). When they finally reach the British coast, they are far away from each other and they both believe that the other one is dead.

Tiriki, and other Atlanteans who came with her, settle down in the swamplands surrounding the Holy Mountain (which is later going to be called the Isle of Avalon). She realizes that the cult of the Great Goddess is much stronger here than it was in Atlantis, so she and her companions start living with the indigenous people and build up a new religion, where the Atlantean knowledge and the Old Faith of the British people merge.

Micail and Tjalan, Prince of Alkonath, on the other hand, try to rebuild the lost glory of Atlantis and start building a huge stone circle – which will later be known as Stonehenge – in order to turn the people of Britain to slaves by using its tremendous powers.

When Tiriki and her followers finally come in contact with the other Atlantean settlement, conflicts arise immediately.
