= Virginia Kidd =

American novelist

- Born: Mildred Virginia Kidd; June 2, 1921; Philadelphia, Pennsylvania
- Died: January 11, 2003 (aged 81); Milford, Pennsylvania
- Known for: Literary Agency

Virginia Kidd (June 2, 1921 – January 11, 2003) was an American literary agent, writer and editor, who worked in particular in science fiction and related fields. She represented science fiction American authors such as Ursula K. Le Guin, R.A. Lafferty, Anne McCaffrey, Judith Merril, and Gene Wolfe. Wolfe modeled Ann Schindler, a character in his 1990 novel Castleview, in large part on Kidd.

== Early life and career ==
Kidd was born Mildred Virginia Kidd in the Germantown district of Philadelphia, Pennsylvania, the youngest daughter of Charles Kidd, a printer, and Zetta Daisy Whorley. She had polio at the age of 2, and was paralyzed for a year from the chest down. Growing up she attended the Berlitz School of Languages where she developed fluency in Spanish, Latin, Italian, French, and German. Kidd discovered science fiction at the age of nine, and became an active science fiction fan. She was a Futurian and, in 1941, became one of the founding members of the Vanguard Amateur Press Association. She did not attend college, saying "because I couldn't go to the University of Chicago, and I wouldn't go to any other." She married opera singer Jack Emden in 1943 (the marriage lasted until 1947), and then fellow writer James Blish; the latter marriage lasted until 1963. She had four children: Karen Anne Emden (born 1944), Asa Benjamin Blish (born and died 1947), Dorothea Elisabeth Blish (born 1954), and Charles Benjamin Blish (born 1956).

Kidd successfully worked as a freelance writer, ghost writer, and proofreader. She is well known for her contributions to the feminist science fiction literary movement, by supporting and representing marginalized authors. Her success overcoming structural barriers in her field makes her a prominent example of a successful businesswoman that was able to work alongside companies such as Ace Publishing and Parnassus Books. She was an active poet, and published Kinesis, a little magazine devoted to poetry which helped to launch the careers of writers including Sonya Dorman.

Her short stories included "Kangaroo Court", published in 1966 in Damon Knight's Orbit 1, and later reprinted as "Flowering Season". She edited or co-edited several science fiction anthologies: Saving Worlds: A Collection of Original Science Fiction Stories (with Roger Elwood, 1973); The Wounded Planet (1974); The Best of Judith Merril (1976); Millennial Women (1978); Interfaces: An Anthology of Speculative Fiction (1980) and Edges: Thirteen New Tales from the Borderlands of the Imagination (1980) (the latter two with client and friend Ursula K. Le Guin). Millennial Women received the 12th Locus Award in 1979.

== Virginia Kidd Literary Agency ==
In 1965, she founded her Virginia Kidd Literary Agency, headquartered at her home, Arrowhead, in Milford, Pennsylvania, and quickly attracted clients from the science fiction community. Here, she established herself as the first female literary agent in science fiction. Kidd was a close friend of Judith Merrill, rooming with her in New York City in the 1940s. In 1961, Merrill introduced Kidd to Anne McCaffrey at a grocery store, a meeting that began a long and successful professional relationship. In addition to being McCaffrey's agent and editor, Kidd provided emotional support and graduate level English instruction to McCaffrey though she was at times a harsh critic, telling her to burn the first version of Dragonquest. Her clients included David R. Bunch, Juanita Coulson, George Alec Effinger, Alan Dean Foster, Richard E. Geis, Ursula K. Le Guin, Zach Hughes, Laurence Janifer, R. A. Lafferty, Anne McCaffrey, Judith Merril, Ward Moore, Christopher Priest, Frank M. Robinson, Joanna Russ, and Gene Wolfe.

She withdrew from active management of the agency in the mid-1990s due to complications of diabetes. She died in 2003, but the firm survives her death. She continued to write "in the cracks" (as she put it) throughout her life, publishing her last short story, "Ok, O Che? by K.," in 1995, and her last poem, "Argument," in 1998.

== The Milford Method ==
Along with author Damon Knight and husband James Blish, Kidd developed a method of critique known internationally as the Milford Method. Working by the Milford Method:

- Writing is handed out and read by the critiquers.
- Critiquers make their notes.
- The writer listens silently while the critiquers, going around the circle one at a time, share their critiques.
- The writer can answer only yes-or-no questions.
- The writer is allowed to respond, uninterrupted, at the end of the circle.

The Milford Method is still employed by the Milford Writer's Workshop and has spread to various other writing groups.

== Publications ==
=== Works ===
- “Suburban Harvest.” 1952
- “Assignment Christmas Spirit.” 1966
- “Happily Ever Once Upon (A Play)” 1990
- “Ok, O Che.” Aberrations, 1995
- “A King of King.” With All of Love: Selected Poems, 1995
- “Kangaroo Court.” Orbit I, 1996
- “Argument.” Weird Tales 55, Fall 1998

=== Books edited ===
- McCaffrey, Anne. Dragonflight. New York: Ballantine, 1968.
- Le Guin, Ursula K. The Eye of the Heron. New York: Victor Gollancz Ltd, 1982.

=== Anthologies edited ===
- Saving Worlds: A Collection of Original Science Fiction Stories. New York: Doubleday & Company, 1973. (Republished as The Wounded Planet. New York: Bantam Books, 1974.)
- The Best of Judith Merril. New York: Warner Books, 1976.
- Millennial Women. New York: Delacorte, 1978.
- Edges: Thirteen New Tales from the Borderlands of the Imagination. New York: Pocket Books, 1980.
- Interfaces: An Anthology of Speculative Fiction. New York: Ace Books, 1980.

=== Translations ===
“The Monster in the Park.” Gérard Klein (translated from French by Virginia Kidd). The Magazine of Fantasy and Science Fiction, Vol. 21, No. 3, 1961
