= Priestess of Avalon =

2000 novel by Marion Zimmer Bradley

- First edition
- Author: Marion Zimmer Bradley (completed by Diana L. Paxson)
- Cover artist: Paula Lewis
- Language: English
- Series: Avalon Series
- Genre: Fantasy, historical
- Publisher: Voyager Books
- Publication date: November 6, 2000
- Publication place: United States
- Media type: Print (hardback & paperback) and audio-CD
- Pages: 382
- ISBN: 0-00-224709-7
- OCLC: 44484323
- Dewey Decimal: 813/.54 21
- LC Class: PS3552.R228 P75 2000
- Preceded by: Lady of Avalon
- Followed by: Ancestors of Avalon

Priestess of Avalon is a 2000 novel by American writer Marion Zimmer Bradley, completed posthumously by Diana L. Paxson. It follows detailing the life of Helena, first wife of Western Roman Emperor Constantius Chlorus and mother of Constantine.

== Plot summary ==
The novel begins by showing her birth, with a druid giving a prophecy of her life. It proceeds to show her as a young girl named Eilan, who becomes a priestess on the Isle of Avalon.

As a young woman, the British priestess Eilan, known to the Romans as Helena, falls in love with the charismatic Roman Constantius. The Roman noble takes her away from Avalon as she is banished for this forbidden love and, before long, Helena bears him a son, who will become Constantine the Great.

Helena's position in Roman society now gives her the freedom to travel about in the empire. When her son Constantine becomes Emperor, she slowly discovers brand-new roles. She faces the spread of the new Christian religion and seeks to understand the old knowledge of the goddess in light of the new religion. As Empress-Mother, Helena travels on a pilgrimage to the Holy Land to find the answers to questions that arise between the old religion and the new.

== Characters ==
- Eilan (Julia Coelia Helena, later, Flavia Helena Augusta) – the priestess of the story, protagonist. She is the daughter of Prince Coelius, consort of Constantius, mother of Constantine, and priestess of Avalon
- Constantius – the Roman noble she marries
- Constantine – Eilan's (Helena's) son, Emperor AD 306–37
- Aelia – a young priestess, trained with Helena
- Arganax - Arch-Druid during Helena's youth.
- Atticus – Constantine's Greek tutor
- Ceridachos – Arch-Druid when Dierna becomes High Priestess
- Cigfolla – a priestess of Avalon
- Julius Colius (King Coel) – Prince of Camulodunum, father of Helena
- Corinthius the Elder – Helena's tutor
- Corinthius the Younger – master of a school in Londinium
- Crispus – Constantine's illegitimate son by Minervina
- Cunoarda – Helena's Alban slave
- Dierna – Helena's second cousin, later Lady of Avalon
- Drusilla – cook in Helena and Constantius's household
- Fausta – daughter of Maximian, wife of Constantine, and mother of his legitimate children
- Flavius Pollio – a kinsman of Constantius
- Ganeda – Helena's aunt, Lady of Avalon
- Gwenna – a maiden being trained on Avalon
- Haggaia – Arch-Druid when Helena returns to Avalon
- Helena the Younger ("Lena") – a noblewomen of Treveri, wife of Crispus
- Heron – a maiden being trained on Avalon
- Hrodlind – Helena's German maid
- Katiya – a priestess of Bast in Londinium
- Lactantius – a rhetorician and Christian apologist, tutor to Crispus
- Lucius Viducius - a pottery merchant trading between Gallia and Eburacum
- Macarius - Bishop of Jerusalem
- Marcia - midwife who delivers Constantine
- Martha - a Syrian slave, healed by Helena
- Maxentius - son of Maximian, Augustus in Italy and North Africa
- Minervina - Constantine's Syrian concubine, mother of Crispus
- Philip - Constantine's Servant
- Quintillus - brother of the Emperor Claudius II, Constantius's great uncle
- Rain - High Priestess of Avalon, Helena's mother
- Severus - Caesar appointed by Galerius, executed by Maximian
- Sian - daughter of Ganeda, mother of Dierna and Becca
- Suona - a young priestess of Avalon
- Victorinus - rebel Emperor in the West, AD 268–70
- Vitellia - a Christian matron living in Londinium
- Wren - a maiden being trained on Avalon

== Release details ==
- 2000, UK, Voyager ISBN 0-00-224709-7, Pub date 6 November 2000, hardback (First edition)
- 2001, USA, Viking Books ISBN 0-670-91023-6, Pub date ? May 2001, hardback
- 2001, USA, Penguin Group ISBN 0-14-180303-7, Pub date ? May 2001, audio cassette
- 2001, UK, Voyager ISBN 0-00-648376-3, Pub date 21 May 2001, paperback
- 2002, USA, Roc ISBN 0-451-45862-1, Pub date ? July 2002, paperback

== Reception ==
Publishers Weekly praised the novel, and wrote that "Paxson's own skill at bringing historical characters and places to vivid life enriches Helena's story. This final book in the Bradley canon is sure to please her devotees and win her more."

== Sources ==
- Gulley, Alison (2008). "Marion Zimmer Bradley (June 3, 1930 – September 25, 1999)". In Laura C. Lambdin; Robert T. Lambdin (eds.). Arthurian Writers: A Biographical Encyclopedia. Greenwood Publishing Group. ISBN 9780313346828.
