= Diana L. Paxson =

American neopagan and fantasy writer (born 1943)

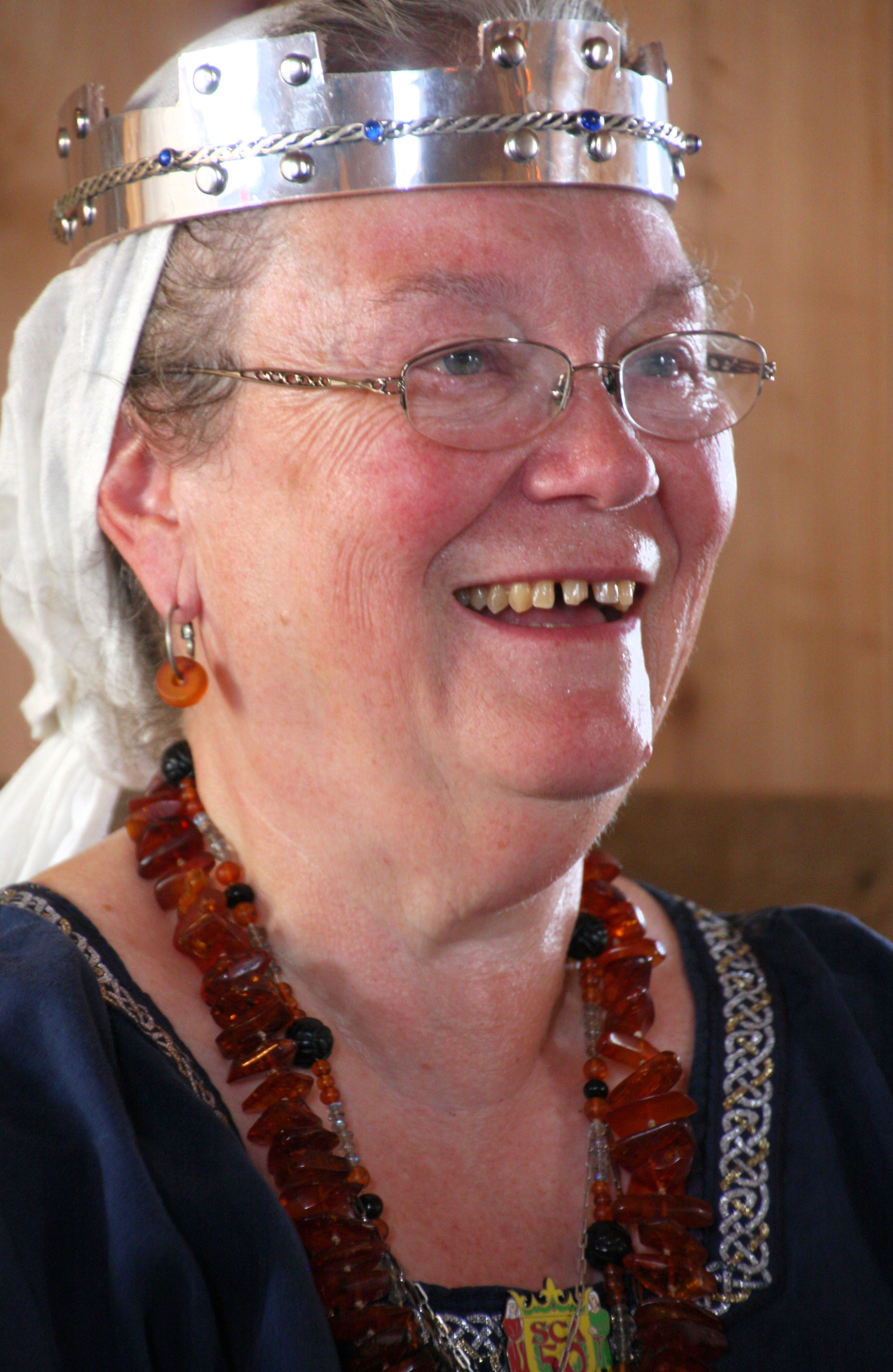
- Paxson in June 2016
- Born: February 20, 1943 (age 83); Detroit, Michigan, US
- Education: Mills College (BA); University of California-Berkeley (MA)
- Website: diana-paxson.com

Diana Lucile Paxson (born February 20, 1943) is an American writer, primarily in the fields of paganism and heathenism. Her published works include fantasy and historical fiction novels, as well as numerous short stories. More recently she has also published books about pagan and heathen religions and practices. She is a founder of the Society for Creative Anachronism, where she is known as Countess Diana Listmaker.

== Career ==
In addition to her multiple novels and collaborations, she has written over 70 short stories. Her best-known works are the Westria novels, and the later books in the Arthurian-themed Avalon series, where she first co-wrote with Marion Zimmer Bradley as an expansion of Bradley's The Mists of Avalon, then—after Bradley's death—took over sole authorship. Paxson's other books include her own Arthurian novel series The Hallowed Isle, and neopagan spirituality writings such as Taking Up the Runes, Essential Asatru, and Trance-Portation. She writes a regular column in the women's spirituality magazine SageWoman.

Paxson has been active in the leadership of a number of organizations. She hosted the first activities of the Society for Creative Anachronism, and was subsequently among that group's founding directors and corporate officers when it incorporated. She was the western regional director of the Science Fiction & Fantasy Writers of America, and is a frequent panelist at science fiction conventions, especially BayCon, where she was the 2007 Fantasy Guest of Honor.

A leader in the neopagan and heathen revivals, Paxson is the founder of The Fellowship of the Spiral Path and has served as First Officer of the Covenant of the Goddess.

She has been Steerswoman of the heathen group, The Troth, a member of its board of directors, and edited its journal, Idunna. On May 10, 2024, The Troth announced her expulsion. "Through unanimous vote by the Board of Directors, Diana Paxson is removed from all positions, including Elder, Clergy, and Membership status with The Troth. Diana Paxson has presented a pervasive and longstanding pattern of behavior that unquestionably impedes the community’s ability to maintain a constructive environment and hinders the organization’s ability to function from this point forward. The Troth stands with all victims of abuse of any kind, and when the light is shined on deeds that harm the innocent, we must stand firm and grant it no peace." "Paxson is not accused of any abuse, but rather her lack of judgment or action regarding abuses that reportedly happened around her." Paxson said during an interview on Last Chance U “If we only had perfect people writing, there would be no one left to write. What we should be doing is honoring what people manage to achieve despite their flaws” when referring to Marion Zimmer Bradley and her husband Walter Breen who were both accused of child sexual abuse.

As of 2024, she is the leader of Hrafnar, a heathen group based in Berkeley, California.

== Personal life ==
She composes and plays music for the harp. She currently lives at her home, Greyhaven, in Berkeley, California.

=== Attack ===
On December 8, 2023, both she and her son Ian Grey were stabbed in their Berkeley home by a family member, who was arrested and charged with attempted murder.

== Publications ==
=== Westria ===
1. Lady of Light (1982) ISBN 0-671-45597-4
2. Lady of Darkness (1983) ISBN 0-671-45882-5
3. Silverhair the Wanderer (1986) ISBN 0-8125-4860-4
4. The Earthstone (1987) ISBN 0-8125-4862-0
5. The Sea Star (1988) ISBN 0-8125-4864-7
6. The Wind Crystal (1990) ISBN 0-8125-0040-7
7. The Jewel of Fire (1992) ISBN 0-8125-1110-7
8. The Golden Hills of Westria (2006) ISBN 0-7653-0889-4

Lady of Light and Lady of Darkness have been republished in the US as a single volume under the name Mistress of the Jewels (1991), and in the UK as Lady of Light, Lady of Darkness (1990)

=== Wodan's Children ===
1. The Wolf and the Raven (1993) ISBN 0-688-10821-0
2. The Dragons of the Rhine (1995) ISBN 0-688-13986-8
3. The Lord of Horses (1996) ISBN 0-688-14606-6

=== The Hallowed Isle ===
1. The Book of the Sword (1999) ISBN 0-380-78870-5
2. The Book of the Spear (1999) ISBN 0-380-80546-4
3. The Book of the Cauldron (1999) ISBN 0-380-80547-2
4. The Book of the Stone (2000) ISBN 0-380-80548-0

These were also published in two volumes, as The Hallowed Isle: Books I & II (2000) and Books III & IV (2001)

=== Chronicles of Fionn mac Cumhal ===
In collaboration with Adrienne Martine-Barnes:

1. Master of Earth and Water (1993) ISBN 0-688-12505-0
2. The Shield Between the Worlds (1994) ISBN 0-688-13176-X
3. Sword of Fire and Shadow (1995) ISBN 0-688-14156-0

=== Avalon series ===
In collaboration with Marion Zimmer Bradley:

- The Forest House (1994) (uncredited)
- Lady of Avalon (1997) (uncredited)
- Priestess of Avalon (2000)

As sole author:

- Ancestors of Avalon (2004)
- Ravens of Avalon (2007)
- Sword of Avalon (2009)

=== Other novels ===
- Brisingamen (1984) ISBN 0-425-07298-3
- White Mare, Red Stallion (1986) ISBN 0-425-08531-7
- The Paradise Tree (1987) ISBN 0-441-65134-8
- The White Raven (1988) ISBN 0-688-07496-0
- The Serpent's Tooth (1991) ISBN 0-688-08339-0

=== Sword and Sorceress series ===
Paxson has authored the following stories from the Sword and Sorceress series, an annual anthology of fantasy stories:

- Sword of Yraine
- Shadow Wood
- Equona's Mare
- The Sword Slave
- A Passage of Power

=== Other short fiction ===
- "The Song of N'Sardi-El" in Millennial Women (1978)
- "An Appropriate Hell" in War in Hell (1988)—part of the Heroes in Hell series
- "Deor" in The Change: Tales of Downfall and Rebirth (2015)—part of the Emberverse series created by S.M. Stirling

=== Other books ===
- Celestial Wisdom for Every Year of Your Life: Discover the Hidden Meaning of Your Age (with Z. Budapest) Weiser Books (2003) ISBN 1-57863-282-X, ISBN 978-1-57863-282-4
- Taking Up the Runes: A Complete Guide to Using Runes in Spells, Rituals, Divination, and Magic Weiser Books (April 20, 2005) ISBN 1-57863-325-7, ISBN 978-1-57863-325-8
- Essential Asatru: Walking the Path of Norse Paganism Citadel (December 1, 2006) ISBN 0-8065-2708-0, ISBN 978-0-8065-2708-6
- Trance-Portation: Learning to Navigate the Inner World Red Wheel/Weiser Books (November 1, 2008) ISBN 1-57863-405-9, ISBN 978-1-57863-405-7

== General and cited references ==
- Vale, V. and John Sulak (2001). "Interview with Diana L. Paxson" in Modern Pagans. San Francisco: Re/Search Publications. ISBN 1-889307-10-6.
