= List of Pern books =

This list follows Pern historical order. See Dragonriders of Pern for publication order and for more bibliographic information on the short fiction.

Dragonriders of Pern is a science fiction series initiated by Anne McCaffrey with the Hugo Award–winning novella Weyr Search in 1967. The stories feature human history on the planet Pern, which might be called human-draconian society for its lifelong inter-species relationships between humans and dragons. Anne McCaffrey wrote all the Pern stories until 2003; as of 2012, eight books by her son Todd McCaffrey or by Anne and Todd have continued the series. In all, there are 24 novels, two collections of short fiction, and a few uncollected works. This includes one book by Anne and Todd published in July 2012, several months after her death, and one published by her daughter Gigi in 2018.

This list follows Pern historical order, which is different from the order of publication. The sequence is disputable at some points because many of the works overlap in time or feature travel between times.

The point of reference for Pern chronology is "Landing", when transport ships arrived and human settlement began. Years, or "Turns" around Pern's sun, are counted After Landing or "AL". (Note: The story is that historical knowledge of human society on Pern was lost long before the Ninth Pass setting of the first six books published, or the Sixth Pass setting of Moreta (1967 to 1983), evidently before the Third Pass setting of Todd McCaffrey's contributions (from 2003). Within most of the novels, therefore, the date A.L. is unknown to the people of Pern (and the fact of colonization is legendary), but the McCaffreys provide many dates for the benefit of readers, in the chapter and section headings of some books and in some front or back matter.)

== Before Landing ==
The planet Rukbat 3 was surveyed about 200 years before settlement ("Landing").

- The Chronicles of Pern: First Fall (1993 collection)
  "The Survey: P.E.R.N."

== First Pass ==
These stories are set before and during the First Pass, from just before settlers landed on Pern until about fifty years afterward (0 to 50 AL).

- Dragonsdawn (1988)
  "Landing" (0 to 2 AL)
  "Thread" (8 AL)
  "Crossing" (8 to 9 AL)
- The Chronicles of Pern: First Fall (1993 collection)
  "The Dolphins' Bell"
  "The Ford of Red Hanrahan"
  "The Second Weyr"
  "Rescue Run"

== First Interval ==
Just after the First Pass, 58 years after landing.

- Dragonsblood (2005, by Todd McCaffrey) – set partly in 58 AL, primarily in 508 AL

== Second Pass ==
Just before and during the Second Pass, about 250 years after landing.

- Red Star Rising (1996) (called Dragonseye for US release)

== Third Pass ==
Just before and during the Third Pass, about 500 years after landing.

- Dragon's Kin (2004, Anne & Todd McCaffrey)
- Dragon's Fire (2006, Anne & Todd McCaffrey) – part one during Dragon's Kin
- Dragon Harper (2007, Anne & Todd McCaffrey)
- Dragonsblood (2005, Todd McCaffrey) – most events
- Dragonheart (2008, Todd McCaffrey) – frame during Dragonsblood
- Dragongirl (2010, Todd McCaffrey)
- Dragon's Time (2011, Anne & Todd McCaffrey)
- Sky Dragons (2012, Anne & Todd McCaffrey)

== Sixth Pass ==
Late in the Sixth Pass, about 1550 years after landing.

- Moreta: Dragonlady of Pern (1983)
- Nerilka's Story (1986) – coincident with Moreta
- "Beyond Between" – short story in Legends II: New Short Novels by the Masters of Modern Fantasy (2003)

== Ninth Pass ==
Just before and during the Ninth Pass, about 2500 years after landing.

- The Masterharper of Pern (1998) – set 55 years before the Pass until the first part of Dragonflight
- "Runner of Pern" (1998) – novella later collected in A Gift of Dragons
- Dragonflight (1968) – first novel written, a fix-up of two previously published stories
  "Weyr Search"
  "Dragonrider"
- Dragonquest (1970)
- Dragonsong (1976) – during Dragonquest, closing almost simultaneously
- Dragonsinger (1977) – during seven days following Dragonsong
- Dragondrums (1979) – closing before the end of The White Dragon
- Dragon's Code (2018, Gigi McCaffrey) – concurrent to The White Dragon
- The White Dragon (1978) – incorporating the short story A Time When (1975)
- "The Impression" (1989) – short story by Jody Lynn Nye and Anne McCaffrey in The Dragonlover's Guide to Pern
- "The Smallest Dragonboy" (1973) – short story later collected in A Gift of Dragons. It is also found in the anthology Get Off the Unicorn published by Del Rey press.
- "The Girl Who Heard Dragons" (1986) – novella later collected in A Gift of Dragons – early during The Renegades of Pern
- The Renegades of Pern (1989)
- All the Weyrs of Pern (1991)
- The Dolphins of Pern (1994) – during and immediately after All the Weyrs of Pern
- The Skies of Pern (2001)
- After the Fall is Over (unfinished) – set after the Ninth Pass in "New Era Pern"

== Undatable ==
One short story cannot be dated even approximately. Some readers have inferred that it takes place during the Second or Third Pass.

- "Ever the Twain" (2002) – original to the collection A Gift of Dragons
