= List of Dragonriders of Pern characters =

Characters in the Dragonriders of Pern series of science fiction novels by Anne McCaffrey.

== 8th Interval, 9th Pass ==
=== Major characters ===
==== AIVAS ====
AIVAS is an advanced computer (Artificial Intelligence Voice Address System), found by Jaxom, Jancis, and Piemur while they were excavating the city called Landing, the original settlement of the ancestors (the original colonists from Dragonsdawn), that had been buried in ash during a volcanic eruption. AIVAS has remained undisturbed since the events of Dragonsdawn some 2,500 years earlier and, in addition to holding a huge volume of stored information long since lost to the Pernese society, claims to be able to eliminate the threat of Thread forever. AIVAS reintroduced many technological advancements to the society. Some people, feeling AIVAS was a threat to their way of life, called it an "abomination" and tried to destroy it, but they were unsuccessful.

==== F'lar ====
F'lar is the weyrleader of Benden Weyr and the rider of bronze Mnementh.

F'lar was born Fallarnon, 32 turns before the beginning of the Ninth Pass of the Red Star. His father, F'lon, and his grandfather, S'loner, were both Weyrleaders in their own time. His mother was Larna, who died just after giving birth to him, and he was raised by Manora, the Headwoman at Benden Weyr and mother of his half-brother F'nor.

At the time of his ascension to Weyrleader, Benden Weyr was the only populated weyr on Pern. Like F'lon, F'lar believed that Thread would return to devastate the land. He took responsibility for ensuring that Pern was protected from Thread, and he even promised the Lord Holders that he would destroy Thread completely at its source, the Red Star.

F'lar is a champion of justice and was involved in a number of knife fights that were fought to protect both his beliefs and those less able to defend themselves. He fought and killed Fax, the self-styled "Lord of Seven Holds", when the visit of dragonriders to his holdings precipitated a challenge to Fax's authority. This victory resulted in the discovery of Lessa of Ruatha Hold as a candidate for the last remaining queen egg, and ultimately the successful Impression of Ramoth. Later, he also fought the oldtimer T'ron (who challenged him when he offered to help another Weyr) and T'kul (whose dragon, Salth, had just died trying to fly the queen Caylith, in contravention of an agreement that only younger Bronzes would have the opportunity).

Mnementh flew Ramoth to establish F'lar's leadership in the weyr, and F'lar and Lessa became lifemates. Together they had a son, F'lessan, whose childhood name was Felessan.

After the discovery of AIVAS, F'lar was one of the champions of the scheme that rid Pern of Thread forever.

F'lar has dark hair (later described as greying), and amber eyes that he inherited from his sire, Falloner (F'lon).

==== F'nor ====
Famanoran or F'nor is the rider of the brown dragon Canth and was the son of Benden Weyr's former Weyrleader, F'lon, and its current Headwoman, Manora. He was also the half-brother of the current weyrleader, F'lar. He is a wingsecond at Benden.

F'nor is a major character in the books; his most notable deed was his flight to the Red Star in an attempt to destroy Thread at its source. This attempt was unsuccessful, as the Red Star could not support human or dragon life, and almost cost both him and his dragon their lives.

F'nor and Brekke formed a long-term relationship.

==== F'lessan ====
F'lessan is the rider of bronze Golanth.

A Benden Weyr native, F'lessan was born as "Felessan", and is the son of the Benden Weyrleaders, F'lar and Lessa. Since Lessa nearly died giving birth to him, he has no full siblings (nor any known half-siblings). Through Lessa, F'lessan is related to Lord Kale of Ruatha Hold, Lessa's late father, who was killed, as well as almost all of Ruathan blood, by Fax.

When he was young, F'lessan befriended young Lord Jaxom, prior to Jaxom's taking on his full duties at the Ruathan Holdship. In his early teens, F'lessan Impressed a bronze, young Golanth, from a clutch of Ramoth and Mnementh, his parents' dragons. Over the Turns, F'lessan and Golanth (called "Golly") became one of the key young dragonpairs that helped to stop Thread from returning. F'lessan also fell in love with Tai, a young Monaco Bay rider of green Zaranth, in The Skies of Pern. He has three sons, including S'lan, a brown rider.

F'lessan later discovered and restored the abandoned Honshu Hold] which he claimed and called "Honshu Weyrhold".

F'lessan and his dragon were injured in a skirmish involving felines in The Skies of Pern, but recovered, though his dragon was permanently handicapped.

==== Jaxom ====
Jaxom is both a dragonrider and a Lord Holder. He was declared the Lord of Ruatha Hold after his mother's death, and was raised by the ex-dragonrider Lytol. Jaxom caused controversy among the leaders of Pern by Impressing the white dragon, Ruth, when he was eleven years old. Later, he became a hero, although he did not tell anyone at the time, by rescuing a queen egg of Ramoth's (the Benden queen dragon) from the rebellious Oldtimers, who had stolen it in an attempt to repopulate their Weyr. He was also one of the central forces of the movement to banish Thread from Pern forever.

Jaxom is born approximately three Turns (years) before the start of the Ninth Pass of the Red Star, while F'lar and F'nor were leading a search for candidates for the last Queen egg of dragon queen Nemorth's final clutch. His mother, Lady Gemma, wife of Fax, dies giving birth to him.

Fax initially agrees to acknowledge Jaxom as the new Lord of Ruatha Hold on the basis of the Hold being unable to adequately provide for its Lord, but threatens to renege on that promise and attacks F'lar, who kills Fax in the duel, leaving Jaxom an orphan.

Deelan, the mother of Dorse, is his wet nurse and foster mother. Until Jaxom is old enough to take his position as Lord Holder, Ruatha is left in the hands of Lytol, a former dragonrider and Craftmaster weaver, who acts as mentor and guardian to Jaxom throughout his younger years.

On a visit to Benden Weyr, Jaxom and his friend Felessan (later, F'lessan, and also the son of F'lar and Lessa) take the chance to spy upon a clutch of Ramoth's eggs, and Jaxom expresses concern about the smallest egg and touches it. On their way back, exploring the back tunnels of the Weyr, the two boys discover a previously unknown room, with diagrams from ancient times and a microscope.

When Jaxom returns to the Weyr for the Hatching, the white egg fails to hatch, and Jaxom impresses Ruth when he breaks the egg's unusually tough shell and inner membrane (it is later thought that touching the egg is what caused Jaxom to be able to sense the unhatched Ruth and Lessa later allows the new candidates to touch the eggs before hatching, which reduces the amount of confusion and injury of candidates during the hatching process). The Impression is considered a nuisance by many, as Jaxom has responsibilities as Lord Holder to uphold, and some feel it might create a conflict of interests. Also, a dragon and its rider must live in a Weyr, but Jaxom as a future Lord Holder must live in his hold, and clearly he can not live in two places at the same time. This problem is sorted by the pragmatic Lytol who points out that any place a dragon lives is by definition a weyr, so if Ruth were to live in Ruatha's stables, the stables become a weyr. Ruth is not expected to mature to a size which would allow him to join a Thread-fighting wing of a weyr, which would take Jaxom away from his responsibilities in Ruatha, so the two are allowed to return to Ruatha.

Growing up, Ruth becomes his main friend, but once allowed to fly, and then to go between, he finds friends among other students at the Harper Hall, Smithcraft and in the Weyr. He also learns how to go between time as well as place, and, despite thinking that it would bring down recriminations upon him, to flame Thread. Because Ruth is especially adept at 'Timing it', he and Jaxom play a major part in the end of Threadfall forever.

Jaxom falls in love with Sharra, the sister of Southern Holder Toric and expert Healer, who nurses him back to health when Jaxom succumbs to a potentially fatal illness known as "Firehead". His feelings for her are reciprocated, and Sharra, through their relationship, becomes the only other person who can hear Ruth's thoughts. Even though Toric has plans for his sister that do not include "a table-sized Hold in the North", Jaxom and Ruth fly into the Southern area and rescue Sharra; their relationship is then grudgingly accepted by Toric, and they are later married at Ruatha Hold. Together they had two boys whose names were Jarrol and Shawan.

==== Lessa ====
Lessa is a small dark powerful woman. She is Benden Weyrwoman during the Ninth Pass, and rider of the gold queen dragon Ramoth. Lessa's psychic ability to influence the thoughts and actions of others plays a role in various parts of the series.

Lessa is the daughter of Kale and Adessa, Lord and Lady of Ruatha Hold. Kale was an amiable man and in ordinary times was considered the ideal Lord Holder, but Kale underestimated the greed of his neighbor, Fax, Lord Holder of High Reaches, who had conquered five other holds since claiming his own. Kale's over-optimism and trusting nature resulted in his death and almost all of the Ruathan bloodline. Lessa escaped her family's massacre because she hid in the watch-wher's den. According to the books, Lessa was 11 turns (years) old at the time of the attack, although in Dragonflight, F'lar guesses that she could not have been over 10 years old at the time.

Lessa was already headstrong and independent. Her father mentions her as "stubborn at only four [years old]", and the Harper Robinton is amused, years later, when she falls asleep during a marching song.

Lessa spends a decade as a drudge in Ruatha's kitchens, where she survives abuse and subtly undermines a hold which should otherwise thrive, to gain revenge against Fax. She bides her time, hoping Fax will renounce the hold or be killed so that she can step forward and claim the Hold as the only survivor of Ruathan Blood. When Benden dragonriders arrive in Search for a woman with the telepathic talents to Impress the new queen dragonet, the dragons feel her aura. She uses her psychic abilities to force the dragonrider F'lar to a duel with Fax, which F'lar wins.

Lessa reluctantly gives up her right to inherit Ruatha Hold to the newborn Jaxom, who is the son of her distant cousin Gemma, whom Fax married to give his claim to Ruatha legitimacy. She travels to Benden Weyr and becomes Pern's only Weyrwoman, and joins forces with Weyrleader F'lar to fight the resurgence of the voracious alien life-form called "Thread".

Lessa's most notable achievement is her rediscovery that dragons can travel between times as well as places. She makes daring use of this skill to make a single jump back 400 Turns into the past in a search for help to fight Thread in her time. F'lar believes she has jumped to her death and is left in despair in the present, but Lessa succeeds in persuading the dragonriders at the end of the Eighth Pass to travel with her to the future. These "Oldtimers" and the riders of Lessa's time resume the battle against Thread's menace to life on Pern. Several of these Oldtimers later become an additional threat to Lessa's and F'lar's quest to help Pern survive the present Pass.

Lessa is at first a seemingly unsociable and cynical personality because of the abuse she endured after Fax's conquest of Ruatha. She grows and matures during the course of the books into one of Pern's greatest leaders and a loving mate to F'lar. Her short temper does become famous on Pern and she continues to use her strong psychic ability to influence other people's moods and perceptions. Lessa is one of the few on Pern who can speak to all the dragons.

Lessa is described as petite, almost childlike, with long, thick black hair. Her queen Ramoth is the largest dragon on the planet.

F'lessan is her only child. Lessa almost dies in childbirth, and additional pregnancies are assessed as too risky. This leaves Lessa somewhat bitter, and she regrets in one book that she was not like Kylara, a Weyrwoman known for promiscuity, who bore several children but wanted none of them.

The Skies of Pern states that Lessa left F'lessan's care to his foster mother and never paid much attention to him. Manora replies that this was expected, since she was Weyrwoman and had other duties.

==== Menolly ====
Menolly is a tall, thin, dark-haired girl.

The youngest child of Yanus, Holder of Half-Circle Sea Hold, she assisted Hold Harper Petiron (Master Robinton's father) in teaching the Hold children their learning songs, wrote her own songs and secretly dreamed of becoming a Harper, though her isolated, conservative Hold thought that was improper for girls. Her parents grudgingly allowed her to continue teaching music to the Hold children after Petiron's death because their community had no other Harper, but they forbade her to write any music or sing or play any she had written, again because in their view Harpering was not for girls. She was forbidden to make music at all once replacement Harper Elgion arrived; in fact, her father severely beat her when she was caught "tuning" - playing her own compositions, but only a few bars - in front of the Hold children before Elgion's arrival. When Menolly seriously slashed her left hand while gutting fish, her mother deliberately allowed the wound to heal incorrectly to prevent her from playing again, and Yanus told Elgion that the one who had taken over the Teachings after Petiron died had been a boy fosterling who had returned to his own Hold. Menolly ran away from the Hold and took refuge in a cliff-side cave where, during a Threadfall, she unintentionally Impressed nine fire-lizards: gold Beauty, bronzes Rocky and Diver, browns Mimic, Lazybones and Brownie, blue Uncle and greens Auntie One and Auntie Two (later in the series it is also revealed that she again unintentionally Impressed another bronze fire-lizard, Poll). Menolly lived Holdless in the cave with her fire lizards, teaching her friends to enjoy music and to sing, until one day she was caught outside far from her cave during Threadfall, and while trying to outrun the falling Thread she was rescued by a brown dragon rider, who brought her to Benden Weyr, where she was befriended by Benden Headwoman Manora and fellow fire lizard owner Mirrim and came to the attention of Lessa herself when it was discovered that Menolly had Impressed nine fire lizards. Menolly was also responsible for finding and providing a clutch of fire lizard eggs for Benden to distribute to certain individuals. Masterharper Robinton, who had been searching for the very talented apprentice that Petiron had mentioned in messages to the Harper Hall and who had been promised two fire lizard eggs by Benden Weyr, accidentally stumbled across her there after a Hatching, was alerted as to her identity by Harper Elgion (who had discovered the truth about Menolly and was also present at the Benden Hatching) and immediately brought her to the Harper Hall.

There, she befriended the mentally-challenged drudge Camo and was befriended by precocious apprentice Piemur, female student Audiva, Harper Hall Headwoman Silvina and Journeyman Harper Sebell. Not everyone approved of a girl becoming a Harper, and her talent and her fire-lizards brought the envy of the female students down on her head. Her talent and skills caused her to rise from apprentice to journeyman just a week after her arrival at the Harper Hall. Songs helped and were used to transmit news and current events throughout Pern, and Menolly could compose a song out of nearly anything. She wrote many popular songs, including "The Fire Lizard/Queen's Song" and "Brekke's Song". Her knowledge of and expertise with fire lizards also brought her to the attention of Lord Groghe of Fort Weyr, himself the companion of fire lizard queen Merga.

Later, Sebell came to fall in love with Menolly (a feeling which was intensified when his queen fire lizard Kimi and her bronze fire lizard Diver mated), but she deeply loved and revered Master Robinton. Sebell was able to accept that "Menolly's heart will never be his alone, he will always have to share a place with her love of music and the Masterharper". Menolly married Sebell some time after he became Masterharper following Masterharper Robinton's nearly fatal heart attack and retirement. They had three children, named Robse, Olos and Lemisa. Menolly went on to become a Masterharper and helped with the movement to banish Thread from Pern forever. Her songs were very important to Pern's evolving society.

==== Piemur ====
Piemur, originally the son of a herdsman in Crom, is taken to the Harper Hall as an apprentice due to the excellent voice he possesses, though he has little aptitude in other Harper skills such as instrument-making and transcription. Piemur is chosen as the special apprentice of Master Shonagar, the Master of Voice at that time. Due to his small stature, he is forced to develop other talents in order to be able to enjoy his residence at the Harper Hall, and becomes known as a person of constant mischief and disregard for Hall regulations.

When during Dragonsinger Menolly arrives at the Harper Hall (though both this and Dragonsong are viewed primarily through the eyes of Menolly), Piemur is one of the first to get to know her. At first this interest is merely curiosity regarding Menolly's possession of nine fire lizards, though it grows to a close mutual friendship throughout Dragonsinger, the second book in the Harper Hall trilogy. Piemur has doubts about his future in the Harper Hall, unsure what will become of him when his voice breaks. He shares these doubts with Menolly, who convinces him to concentrate more on the present.

At the start of Dragondrums, Piemur's voice begins to break. While his voice is in transition he is unable to sing. He becomes the special apprentice of Masterharper Robinton himself, but this is kept secret. Piemur is publicly assigned to the Drum Tower (a communications system using timpani-style drums and complicated drum measures to communicate over long distances) as a drum apprentice under Drum-Master Olodkey. Robinton's plan for Piemur is to use his natural talents to gather information that could be useful for the planning the future of Pern. These missions include a visit to a nearby sapphire mine, where Piemur discovers that the exiled Oldtimers are taking gemstones without payment.

The other apprentice and journeyman harpers in the Drumheights know Piemur's reputation, so they harass him according to the mischief they expect in return. Piemur believes that this is a test, in which he is supposed to remain silent about the bullying in order to prove his discretion. He further antagonizes his fellow drum-apprentices by rapidly surpassing them in knowledge of the drum code, demonstrating a real aptitude for communication-drumming. The combination of these two factors leads to the other apprentices greasing the steps leading to the Drumheights: Piemur slips on the steps while carrying a message. Taking a dangerous fall, he is lucky to escape with nothing worse than a severe concussion. Following this incident, he is removed from the Drum Tower.

When Piemur recovers from his fall, Master Robinton assigns him a mission with Journeyman Sebell. They are to join the Gather at Lord Meron's Hold (disguised as cattle traders, ironically enough), to report the commoners' mood concerning Lord Meron's association with the banned Oldtimers as well as the Lord Holder himself, who is slowly dying of a wasting disease. One of the first things they notice is the extreme number of fire lizards in the Hold, mostly greens. They deduce that the fire lizards are the payment Lord Meron has been receiving from the Oldtimers for the goods he trades them. After a series of events, Piemur finds himself being chased around Nabol Hold, unable to escape, with a fire lizard egg stolen from Lord Meron's hearth that he believes is a queen egg. He hides in a sack in a small storage room and promptly falls fast asleep, presumably due to his recent head injury.

While Piemur sleeps with the egg tucked warmly in his shirt, the sacks are transported between to Southern Weyr, where the Oldtimers reside, and Piemur escapes without being discovered. He flees the area until the fire lizard, which he was correct to assume was a queen, has hatched. He names the fire lizard Farli (possibly as a coincidence, this has the same pronunciation as the Scandinavian "danger" – "farlig", "farleg", etc.).

On his way to Southern Hold (inhabited by pioneers from the Northern Continent, not the Oldtimers of the Southern Weyr), Piemur meets Sharra, a Healer from Southern, and helps her gather plants and herbs used by the Healers, and with the research she is conducting on the native plants of the Southern Continent. They return to the Hold on the same day that Menolly and Sebell, who until now have been searching the Northern Continent for him, arrive at Southern Hold. As there is no reason for Piemur to immediately return to the Northern Continent – his voice has not yet settled into an adult placement and Masterharper Robinton was interested in exploring the Southern Continent regardless of where Piemur was – he is promoted by Robinton to the rank of drum-journeyman and instructed to stay and map the coast of the Southern Continent. Holder Toric accepts him into the Southern Hold.

Along with Jaxom, Lord of Ruatha Hold and rider of the White Dragon Ruth and Sharra, Piemur takes part in the construction of Cove Hold and later in the rediscovery of Landing, the first human settlement on Pern, and thus the uncovering of the AIVAS and all subsequent events.

Piemur is involved in a large amount of the controversial "progress" that occurs after the awakening of the AIVAS, and together with Jancis, granddaughter of Mastersmith Farandel and a Smithcraft Master in her own right, rebuilds one of the first computers. Piemur later marries Jancis, and has a son with her, Pierjan.

==== Robinton ====
Robinton is a central character in many different Dragonriders of Pern books set in the Ninth Pass. When Anne McCaffrey first wrote about him in Dragonflight, his character was a sketchy representation of the Harper Craft Hall. In Dragonquest his personality became more fully developed and this process was continued throughout Dragonsong, Dragonsinger and Dragondrums. In The Masterharper of Pern, the story of young Robinton is the canvas for developing the backstory alluded to throughout the original Pern Chronicles.

The early stories of Robinton's life allowed McCaffrey to develop characters such as F'lon, father of F'lar and F'nor, and Silvina, Camo and Shonagar of the Harper Hall. McCaffrey also used him to expand the story of Fax, allowing Robinton to provide an extra perspective on scenes that were some of her earliest writings.

Robinton, as the Masterharper, embodies McCaffrey's ideals for the Harper Hall. A musical prodigy, he surpassed both his parents by composing popular songs throughout his childhood, and becoming a journeyman harper at fifteen. He was faced with professional jealousy (which caused estrangement from his father when young), similar to that which challenged Harpers Menolly and Piemur in Dragonsinger and Dragondrums.

A diplomat, teacher and leader, he helped the Benden Weyrleaders, Lessa and F'lar, deal with the return of Thread and the Oldtimers, gaining the love and respect of everyone on Pern. Of course, McCaffrey ensured that he had redeemable character flaws, such as his great fondness for wine (particularly Benden wine), which could be said to have saved his life in one point in The White Dragon, when he suffered a heart attack.

When Robinton eventually stepped down as Masterharper and retired to Cove Hold on the Southern Continent, he became close friends with Lytol, former Lord Warder of Ruatha Hold and a former Benden brown rider (mentioned as a green rider in Dragonflight), as well as D'ram, rider of bronze Tiroth and a former Oldtimer Weyrleader of Ista. This friendship reflects the lessening of the isolation and rigidly controlled autonomy of Weyr, Hold and Hall, which was a constant theme of the original Pern Chronicles.

Upon the discovery of Landing and the Artificial Intelligence Voice-Address System (AIVAS/Aivas) at the end of The Renegades of Pern, Robinton, D'ram and Lytol took over joint administration of the Landing facility, leading the efforts to both end the onslaught of Thread and to modernize Pernese society. In All the Weyrs of Pern, "traditionalist" Pernese attempted to end what they perceived as AIVAS' "destructive" influence on their society by drugging Robinton's food and drink, kidnapping him and holding him for ransom in exchange for AIVAS' destruction. Robinton was quickly found and rescued, but the effects of the overdose took its toll on Robinton's health. After the Red Star's orbit was altered and ensuring that the current Pass would be the last, he died peacefully in the AIVAS chamber, shortly after AIVAS shut itself down. His fire-lizard Zair, like a dragon following his rider, died with him.

Robinton was laid to rest in the waters of his beloved Cove Hold, and every dragonrider, Lord Holder and Craftmaster on the planet turned out for the service. His death was a metaphor for the end of the great struggle with Thread, which had consumed the lives of all Pernese since shortly after Landing on Pern.

==== Mnementh ====
Mnementh (pronounced "nementh") is the bronze dragon of F'lar, the Weyrleader of Benden Weyr during the Ninth Pass. Mnementh is the sole mate of gold dragon Ramoth and thus the sire or ancestor of many dragons born during the Ninth Pass. He is also the second-largest dragon on Pern, after Ramoth (though Ramoth is not much larger), although first Menolly's fire-lizards, then Robinton's fire-lizard Zair, and then later Jaxom's Ruth mistakenly describe him as "the biggest one" and "the biggest dragon on all Pern".

==== Ramoth ====
Ramoth is the gold queen dragon of Lessa, the Weyrwoman of Benden Weyr during the Ninth Pass. She is the mate of Mnementh, and is the largest dragon on Pern. For a period of time at the beginning of the Ninth Pass, Ramoth was the only remaining queen dragon on all of Pern, until the queen Prideth was hatched from her first clutch. Because the two queens would not be able to repopulate the empty remaining Weyrs in time for the approaching Pass, Lessa and Ramoth jumped back in time 400 Turns to bring forward the members of the empty Weyrs.

==== Ruth ====
Ruth is the only white dragon described in the series, and is much smaller than the other dragons in the series' Ninth Pass timeline. In Dragonquest, Ruth hatches near the end of the novel. The dragon's story is expanded upon in the novel The White Dragon.

In Dragonquest, the gold dragon Ramoth lays a clutch of eggs, one of which McCaffrey describes as small with an unusually tough shell. The weyrfolk of Benden Weyr assume that the egg will not hatch, and begin to depart from the Hatching Ground when all the other hatchling dragonets have impressed with human dragonriders. Lord Jaxom jumps from the bleachers to the Hatching Ground to assist the unborn dragonet by breaking open the shell and inadvertently Impresses the dragon, immediately causing a major uproar among the Lord Holders and the dragonriders.

After Impression, the Council decides that it has no problem with the young Lord's bond with Ruth, as it is believed that Ruth will not live long. He does survive to maturity, although he is much smaller than the other dragons. In order to avoid the animosity of the Lord Holders, Lessa, F'lar and N'ton of Fort Weyr carefully guide the Lord and dragon. Jaxom is able to fly on Ruth and is trained to go between.

Jaxom becomes frustrated with various restrictions, such as the inability to take Hold of Ruatha and the refusal of Dragonrider status. He rebels, and attempts to teach Ruth to chew firestone. He discovers Ruth's innate ability to orient himself in time while practicing going between. After Jaxom and Ruth are scored by Thread in the course of their recovery of the queen egg stolen from Benden Weyr by the Oldtimers (though they manage to keep what they were really doing when they were scored a secret for a long time), the Weyrfolk consent to give him firestone training and the pair are trained to fight Thread by the riders at Fort Weyr.

In addition to his small size, Ruth is notable for his hide, which though commonly regarded as white, appears to be composed of pale hues from all dragons. It is possible that Ruth is a neuter, and indeed "he" never shows an interest in mating. In addition to his physical attributes, Ruth is unusually willing to speak with humans besides his own rider, and has close and friendly relationships with fire lizards, as well as a long memory and heightened intelligence. He also has a heightened ability to travel between to different times with the knowledge of exactly when and where he is in time and space.

==== Readis ====
Readis is the founder of the Dolphineer Hall and the son of Aramina and Jayge.

==== Sebell ====
Sebell is Robinton's successor as Masterharper of Pern, companion of fire-lizard Kimi and husband of Menolly.

==== Sharra ====
Grew up in Southern Hold in the Southern Continent, she is a journeywoman healer, sister of Holder Toric (later Lord Holder Toric), and spouse to Jaxom, Lord Holder of Ruatha. Together they have two children. She was essential to the annihilation of Thread. When Jaxom was very ill with fire-head, an illness about which little is known save that the causal agent (whatever it is) is present on Southern beaches in the early spring, Ruth felt that it was necessary for her to be able to hear him. He links with Sharra and can hear her as well as Jaxom, Brekke, or Lessa. Before her marriage to Jaxom and moving to Ruatha Hold, she regularly supplied Master Oldive, Masterhealer of Pern, with exotic plants and extracts he uses in drug preparations.

=== Dragonriders and Weyrfolk ===
- Brekke and gold Wirenth (deceased): Brekke is a junior weyrwoman at Southern Weyr and weyrmate of F'nor. Like Lessa, she possesses the rare ability to hear all dragons. After the death of her queen dragon, Brekke became emotionally withdrawn; at Lessa's insistence, she took part in a Hatching at Benden in the hope that she would re-Impress the Hatching queen, but her fire lizard Berd refused to allow her to Impress, which caused her to emerge from her depression. She assisted Sharra in nursing Jaxom when he contracted Fire-head, and when Robinton had his first heart-attack after the duel between F'lar and T'kul she flew to Ista on Ruth to help.
- Carola and gold Feyrith: Carola is weyrwoman at Benden, once-weyrmate of C'rob, weyrmate of S'loner, and mother of Larna.
- Cosira and gold Caylith: Cosira is weyrwoman of Ista.
- C'rob and bronze Spakinth: C'Rob is a wingleader at Benden, while his dragon Spakinth flew Feyrith before Chendith.
- D'ram and bronze Tiroth: D'ram is an Oldtimer Weyrleader at Ista, and later to Southern. Early supporter of F'lar, he lives at Cove Hold with Robinton and Lytol following retirement. Co-administrator of Landing with Robinton and Lytol, he is respected widely as a fair man.
- F'lon (Falloner) and bronze Simanith: F'lon is the weyrleader of Benden Weyr and the rider of bronze Simanith. F'lon is mentioned in Dragonflight, the first book published in the series, as the father of two of its main characters, F'lar and F'nor. Not much was known about him until Anne McCaffrey wrote a prequel, The Masterharper of Pern. In this book, which is set in the Eighth Interval, he is called as Falloner, as he was known as a child, through the eyes of his best friend Robinton. Like his father S'loner, F'lon believed that deadly Thread would return to devastate Pern, although it had not fallen for hundreds of years, and endeavored to prepare Pern for its menace. F'lon's first love was Larna, a girl who he grew up with in Benden Weyr. After she died giving birth to F'lar, he became the partner of Manora, the weyr's Headwoman, and later (to his disgust) the weyrwoman Jora. F'lon is similar to his son F'lar in several ways, including his curly dark hair and unusual amber eyes. F'lon does not have his "head screwed on" as well as F'lar, and often does foolish things out of emotion. This led to his murder by Gifflen, an assassin hired by Fax, the greedy "Lord of Seven Holds".
- G'bear and Winlath: G'bear is Weyrleader at High Reaches Weyr after M'rand retires.
- G'dened and Barnath: G'dened is Weyrleader at Ista and son of D'ram.
- G'narish and bronze Gyarmath: G'narish is Igen Weyrleader.
- J'fery and Willerth: J'fery is Weyrleader of Telgar after R'mart retires.
- K'van and bronze Heth: K'van is Weyrleader at Southern after D'ram.
- Kylara (insane after her dragon's death) and gold Prideth (deceased): Kylara is the headstrong Weyrwoman of the Southern Weyr, who later moved to High Reaches Weyr when the Southern Continent is given to the rebellious Oldtimers who refuse to acknowledge Benden as their sovereign. Kylara is known for flouting sexual and political customs, such as openly taking a lover from among the Lord Holders (Lord Meron of Nabol) rather than maintaining the polite fiction that her Weyrleader, T'bor, is her lover. She also finds much of the domestic work of the Weyrwoman's office distasteful, preferring to leave day-to-day management of the Weyr to the junior gold riders, including Brekke and Vanira (also called Varena). When Brekke's gold Wirenth rises to mate, Kylara is engaged in an intimate liaison with Meron at Nabol (which triggers her own dragon's mating frenzy). Prideth overflies Wirenth and the two dragons battle to the death. Both women survive, but Kylara is left in a childlike state and Brekke suffers deep depression. Kylara is the full-blood sister of Lord Larad of Telgar Hold, the daughter of Lord Tarathel, and the half-sister of Lady (later "Lady Holdless") Thella and Lady Famira of Lemos Hold.
- Larna: Mother of Fallaron (F'lar), she dies two days after Fallaron is born.
- Manora is headwoman of Benden Weyr and the mother of Famanoran (F'nor).
- Mirrim and green Path: Mirrim is Benden Weyr, weyrmate of T'gellan and Monarth and Brekke's fosterling. Mirrim Impressed three firelizards and is notorious for speaking first and thinking later.
- N'ton (Naton) and bronze Lioth: N'ton is Fort Weyrleader, and weyrmate of Margatta and Ludeth.
- R'mart and bronze Branth: R'mart is Telgar Weyrleader.
- R'gul (Rangul) and Hath: R'gul was Weyrleader at Benden before F'lar.
- S'loner and Chendith: S'loner was Weyrleader at Benden before F'lon, weyrmate of Carola and Jora, and father of F'lon and Bravonner.
- Tai and green Zaranth: Tai is a rider at Monaco Bay Weyr and weyrmate of F'lessan.
- T'bor and bronze Orth: T'bor is Weyrleader at Southern, and later at High Reaches.
- T'gellan and bronze Monarth: T'gellan was originally Wing Leader at Benden, and later Weyrleader of Monaco Bay Weyr. He is weyrmate of Mirrim and Talina.
- T'lion and bronze Gadareth: As Monaco Bay Weyr, T'lion helped to re-establish contact with the Monaco Bay dolphins.

=== Oldtimers ===
This is the derogatory term used for those from 400 Turns past called by Lessa and Ramoth into the present Turn. Some of them were exiled to the Southern Continent because they were unable to accept the leadership of the current-day dragonriders. The term is only usually used in reference to the older Oldtimers that were exiled south:

- Bedella is Weyrwoman of Telgar and rider of gold Solth, and is known to be very unintelligent. She likes music and is R'mart's Weyrmate.
- B'zon is bronzerider who let his dragon, Ranilth, chase gold Caylith at Ista.
- D'ram is a rider of bronze Tiroth, Weyrleader at Ista Weyr, an ally of F'lar, and later, along with Robinton and Lytol, became an administrator of Landing, the original settlement of the original colonists before they were forced out by a volcanic eruption. He was not one of those exiled south. He takes command of Southern Weyr after the death of T'Kul and Salth.
- Fanna: Weyrwoman of Ista Weyr, she rode gold Mirath; after her death, D'ram retires as Istan Weyrleader.
- G'narish: Igen Oldtime Weyrleader, he is younger than many other Oldtimers and the rider of bronze Gyarmath.
- Mardra and gold Loranth: Former Weyrwoman of Fort Weyr and weyrmate of T'ron and Fidranth, she was exiled to Southern because she would not accept the primacy of Benden Weyr.
- Merika and an unknown queen: Merika is a former Weyrwoman of High Reaches, who is hated by all. She is supposed to have a bad temper. Kylara mentioned that when she helped out during Threadfall, the woman treated her with contempt.
- Nadira is Igen Weyrwoman and rider of gold Baylith.
- R'mart: Weyrleader of Telgar and rider of bronze Branth, he stepped down in the 9th Pass.
- T'kul and bronze Salth: Former Weyrleader of High Reaches and later Southern Weyrleader, he is one of those exiled to Southern because he would not accept the primacy of Benden Weyr. A conservative who kills his bronze Salth when he sends him to attempt to fly the young Istan queen Caylith in a mating flight, he was killed shortly after by F'lar, whom he had attacked.
- T'ron and bronze Fidranth: Former Weyrleader of Fort Weyr, also called T'ton and weyrmate of Mardra and Loranth, T'ron was exiled to Southern because he would not accept the primacy of Benden Weyr.

=== Other Craftspeople ===
- Andemon – MasterFarmer
- Betrice is Journeyman Healer and wife of Gennell.
- Curran – MasterFisher
- Domick is Masterharper and Craftmaster of Song Composition.
- Erragon – Master Astronomer
- Fandarel is MasterSmith and grandfather of Jancis.
- Gennell was MasterHarper before Robinton and husband of Betrice.
- Idarolan – MasterFisher (retires)
- Jerint is Masterharper and Craftmaster of Instrument Making.
- Kinsale (Nip) – Journeyman Harper/Spy
- Mekelroy (Pinch) – Masterharper/Spy
- Merelan is Masterharper/MasterSinger, wife of Petiron and mother of Robinton.
- Morilton is Norist's successor as MasterGlass-smith.
- Morshall is Harper Craftmaster of Theory.
- Nicat – MasterMiner
- Norist is MasterGlass-smith, who was exiled for involvement in Robinton's kidnapping.
- Oldive – MasterHealer
- Petiron is Masterharper/MasterComposer; teacher of Menolly; husband of Merelan; father of Robinton; and composer of technical and complex music. After Robinton is chosen as the Masterharper, he takes a position as Harper of Half Circle Seahold.
- Shonagar is Masterharper and Craftmaster of Voice.
- Sograny – MasterHerder
- Tagetarl – Journeyman Harper/MasterPrinter
- Terry – MasterSmith
- Traller (Tuck) – Apprentice Harper/Spy
- Wansor – Master Starsmith
- Zurg – MasterWeaver

=== Holders ===
Pern is divided into many Holds. The politics between the lords of these holds provides the backdrop to many of the books.

==== Fax ====
- Lord Fax is a greedy, violent self-styled "Lord of Seven Holds" in Anne McCaffrey's Dragonriders of Pern series. Originally a nephew of Lord Faroguy of High Reaches, Fax was known as being greedy and ruthless even in his youth. He carefully conquered Hold after Hold by means of trickery, marriage, murder and force. He repressed his Holders, denied them education and encouraged them to mistrust harpers and dragonriders. At the height of his power, he controlled High Reaches, Crom, Nabol, and Ruatha, as well as three minor holds. Fax married many women, including Lady Gemma of Crom. Fax's downfall was engineered by Lessa, the orphaned daughter of the Lord Holder of Ruatha, who hid for ten years as a kitchen drudge and mentally repressed Ruatha's natural productivity. On a visit to Ruatha Hold, Fax died in a brutal fight with Bronze dragonrider F'lar, who had come to Search Ruatha Hold for potential dragonriders, but not before he had named his infant son Jaxom (son of Gemma, who was distantly related to the Ruathan bloodline) as his successor. In The White Dragon, Jaxom notices that people are willing to talk to him about his mother Gemma but never about his father Fax (perhaps fearing that he might take after Fax), and later at the uncovering of Landing Lessa compares Southern Holder Toric to Fax, remarking that they were both ambitious.

==== Major Holds ====
- Benden: Lord Maidir (husband of Hayara, father of Raid, Maizella, and Hayon); Lord Raid (supports Benden, but very stubborn); Lord Toronas
- Bitra: Lord Sifer; Lord Sigomal (opposed to AIVAS; deposed and exiled for aiding the plot to kidnap Master Robinton)
- Crom: Lord Lesselden (husband of Relna, killed by Fax); Lord Fax; Lord Nessel (following Fax's death)
- Fort: Lord Grogellan (husband to Winalla, died because he refused to have his appendix surgically removed); Lord Groghe (son of Lord Grogellan, husband of Benoria and friend of Robinton; he is advocate for AIVAS and Benden, and has old fire-lizard Merga and seventeen sons)
- High Reaches: Lord Faroguy (husband of Evelene, believed to have been killed by Fax); Lord Fax (Faroguy's nephew); Lord Bargen (Faroguy's son, succeeds after Fax's death)
- Igen: Lord Laudey; Lord Langree (son and heir of Laudey)
- Ista: Lord Halibran (father of Halanna); Lord Warbret; Lord Fortine
- Keroon: Lord Corman; Lord Kashman (son and heir of Corman)
- Lemos: Lord Asgenar (pro-Benden, husband of Famira)
- Nabol: Lord Fax; Lord Meron (Anti-Benden, his death formed a subplot in Dragondrums); Lord Deckter
- Nerat: Lord Vincet; Lord Begamon (opposed to AIVAS, deposed and exiled for aiding the plot to kidnap Master Robinton); Lord Ciparis (previously Begamon's Steward)
- Ruatha: Lord Ashmichel; Lord Kale (son of Ashmichel, husband of Adessa, father of Lessa, killed by Fax); Lord Fax; Lord Jaxom (succeeded as a baby, husband of Sharra). During Jaxom's minority Ruatha was administered by Lytol (formerly Lytonal, then L'tol, rider of brown Larth).
- Southern Boll: Lord Sangel; Lady Janissian (elected Lady Holder of Southern Boll at Sangel's death)
- Southern Hold: Lord Toric
- Telgar: Lord Tarathel (father of Larad, Thella, and Kylara, related to Petiron); Lord Larad (Pro-Benden, half-brother of Thella, brother of Kylara, became Lord Holder at age 15; he is a father of A'ton, a dragonrider, and Laradian)
- Tillek: Lord Melongel (husband to Juvana, whose sister Kasia married Robinton, but died of a fever after their honeymoon); Lord Oterel (son of Melongel and Juvana, nephew by marriage to Robinton; father of Ranrel, Terentel, and Blesserel); Lord Ranrel (son of Oterel, member of the Fishcrafthall)

==== Minor Holds ====
- Yanus is the Holder of Half-Circle Sea Hold and a father of Menolly, Alemi, Sella (Menolly's older sister) and five other sons. Yanus thought it was disgraceful for a girl to be a harper and considered Menolly a disgrace to the Sea Hold, refusing to even search for her after she disappeared from the Sea Hold.
- Mavi is Yanus' wife and Sea Lady who discouraged Menolly's musical talents.
- Alemi is a third son of Yanus and older brother of Menolly. He is more understanding of and sympathetic towards his talented sister than their parents.
- Jayge is a trader and later Holder of Paradise River in the Southern Continent.
- Aramina: Jayge's wife, Aramina can hear the mental speech of any dragon. She is a cousin of Lessa and the mother of Readis.
- Readis: Two people were named Readis: an uncle of Jayge, who joined Thella's band then later helped Jayge to free Aramina, getting killed in the process; and the son of Jayge and Aramina, who founded both Kahrain Hold and a Dolphin Hall there.

==== Renegades ====
- Thella is a renegade half-sister of Larad, called "Lady Holdless", and she led a band of robbers and tried to capture Aramina.

== Earlier periods ==
=== Colonization and First Pass ===
==== Red Hanrahan ====
- Peter "Red" Hanrahan is a vet who arrives on Pern as one of the original colonists from Earth. From their home in Clonmel in Ireland, he, his wife Mairi, and their two children, Sorka and Brian, travel to Pern in deep sleep on the colony ship Yokohama. Red is one of the founding fathers of Pern society and, along with his extended family, reflects much of McCaffrey's own Irish origins in the multicultural mix of early Pern. As one of the senior vets, Red is a vital staff member in Kitti Ping's dragon engineering project and a source of guidance to the dragonriders of the First Hatching. His own daughter Sorka Hanrahan, along with fellow Irish colonist, Sean Connell, makes first Impression of the native firelizards who provide the genetic material for the dragons. Sorka and Sean later become riders of the First Dragons and founders of Fort Weyr. Throughout this phase, Red provides guidance and support. It is to Red and Mairi that Sean turns in times of stress such as at the death of queen rider Alianne, whose dragon, Chereth, was the first to go between on the death of her rider. Red and Mairi help to raise Sorka and Sean's five children along with their own seven younger children born after their arrival on Pern. When the original northern hemisphere settlement at Fort became over-crowded during the First Pass, Red and Mairi apply to Paul Benden to begin a third settlement in a cave system to the north. They take a hundred and forty-one people representing a range of families, ages and skills, along with the horses and other livestock Red has been carefully breeding to begin the new Hold. On the journey from Fort to the new place, Red's paternal care of his people and his skill with horse-flesh is clearly demonstrated. The key point to the journey is the crossing of a swollen river which marks the boundary of their lands. Red works tirelessly to bring his caravan across the ford. While crossing the ford, Sean arrives to check on their progress and to seek their comfort after the death of Alianne. Eventually, Red's caravan arrives safely and they begin to make their cave system into a new home. Red scrounged from Joel Lillienkamp, the store-keeper of the colony, a set of air-lock doors taken from one of the shuttles which transported the colonists to the surface from the great colony ships still in orbit around the planet. The climax of Red's story is the Dooring of his new hold, before the colony leaders, community and dragonriders. At this point, Red announces the new settlement's name: the Hold of Red's Ford. In the Irish, Rua Atha, or Ruatha, though in correct Irish, the name should be Atha Ruadh (adjectives follow nouns), anglicized as Atharoe.

==== Early dragonriders ====
- Sorka Hanrahan and gold Faranth: Sorka is a leader of the original queenriders and eventual Weyrwoman of Fort Weyr, while Faranth may or may not have been the first fertile queen on Pern, but she clutched the first second-generation gold, ensuring the continuation of the species.
- Sean Connell and bronze Carenath: The leader of the original dragonriders and eventual Weyrleader at Fort Weyr, his dragon flew Faranth.
- M'hall (Michael/Mihall) and bronze Brianth: M'hall is Torene's weyrmate, first Benden Weyrleader and son of Sean and Sorka.
- Torene and gold Alaranth: First Weyrwoman at Benden Weyr, Torene could hear all dragons and was the first to officially put forth the idea of shortening the names of dragonriders.

=== First Interval / Second Pass ===
- Lord Chalkin is the Lord of Bitra in the First Interval, shortly before the Second Pass. He was impeached and exiled due to his blatant disregard of the imminent return of Thread, and the brutal treatment of his people who tried to leave Bitra.
- Lord Jamson is High Reaches Lord Holder in the First Interval, shortly before the Second Pass. He was the only Lord Holder who was opposed to the impeachment of Lord Chalkin of Bitra.
- B'nurrin – Ianath, Igen Weyrleader.
- D'miel – Ronelth, Istan Weyrleader.
- G'don – Chakath, High Reaches Weyrleader.
- K'vin – Charanth, Weyrleader of Telgar.
- M'shall – Craigath, Benden Weyrleader.
- S'nan – Magrith, Fort Weyrleader.

=== Second Interval / Third Pass ===
- Fiona and gold Talenth: Fiona recently impressed Queen rider at Fort Weyr and is eventual Weyrwoman at Telgar Weyr.
- Lorana and gold Arith (deceased): Queenrider at Benden Weyr, Lorana was cured from the illness that decimated the dragons of her time, but lost Arith in the process.
- B'nik and bronze Caranth: B'nik is Weyrleader at Benden Weyr.
- D'gan and bronze Kaloth: D'gan is arrogant Telgar Weyrleader.
- D'vin and Bronze Hurth: D'vin is Weyrleader at High Reaches Weyr.
- K'lior and bronze Rineth: K'lior is an amateur Weyrleader at Fort Weyr.
- M'tal and bronze Gaminth: M'tal is Benden Weyrleader.
- Salina and gold Breth (deceased): Salina is Benden Weyr Weyrwoman and rider of Arith's mother.
- T'mar and bronze Zirenth: T'mar is bronze rider that went back in time to Igen Weyr with Fiona to help heal the injured riders.
- Tullea and gold Minith: Tullea is a nasty Weyrwoman of Benden after Breth's passing.

=== Sixth Pass ===
- Lord Alessan is the Lord of Ruatha in the sixth Pass, brother of Oklina and lover of Moreta.
- Lady Nerilka is a daughter of Lord Tolocamp and Lady Pendra. Nicknamed "Rill" and originally from Fort, she marries Alessan after Moreta's death.
- Bestrum is minor holder on Fort/Ruathan border.
- Gana is Bestrum's lady.
- Lord Ratoshigan is the Lord Holder of Southern Boll.
- Lord Tolocamp is the Lord of Fort Hold during Moreta's time. Tolocamp violated Capiam's quarantine by leaving Ruatha for Fort, where shortly after he locked himself in his apartments and refused entry to anyone. He wouldn't share his abundant supplies with the other holds during the Plague, so Masterhealer Capiam and Masterharper Tirone withdrew their men from his hold. His first wife is Lady Pendra, and second is Lady Anella. He is the father of (by order of birth): Campen, Pendora, Mostar, Doral, Theskin, Silma, Nerilka, Gallen, Jess, Peth, Amilla, Mercia & Merin (twins), Kista, Gabin, Mara, Nia, and Lilla.

==== Dragonriders and dragons ====
- Moreta and gold Orlith: Moreta is Fort Weyr, famous Weyrwoman of history, and lead character in the book Moreta: Dragonlady of Pern (1983).
- B'lerion and Nabeth: B'lerion is Weyrleader of High Reaches who mates with Oklina and Hannath.
- C'ver is an arrogant Watchrider that keeps Moreta from enlisting Telgar Weyr in the plan to disperse the vaccine, causing other riders to cover that area.
- D'say is the father of M'ray with Moreta and Wingleader at Ista Weyr.
- K'dren and Kuzuth: K'dren is Weyrleader at Benden Weyr during Moreta's time.
- Leri and gold Holth: Leri is a former Weyrwoman at Fort Weyr before Moreta.
- M'barak and blue Arith: M'barak is Fort weyrling who helps Moreta transport the serum.
- M'gent and Ith: M'gent is Wingleader at Benden Weyr.
- M'tani and Hogarth: M'tani is a nasty Weyrleader of Telgar Weyr.
- Oklina and gold Hannath: A sister of Alessan at Ruatha Hold, Oklina Impressed the queen Hannath at Orlith's last hatching. She is weyrmate of B'lerion and bronze Nabeth of High Reaches.
- S'peren and bronze Clioth: S'peren is wingleader at fort and second in command to Moreta.
- Sh'gall and Kadith: Sh'gall is the Fort Weyrleader and Moreta's weyrmate.
- K'lon and blue Rogeth: K'lon is a rider at Fort Weyr.

==== Craftmasters/Journeymen ====
- Master Capiam is Masterhealer during the time of Moreta.
- Master Belesdan is Mastertanner who is located at Ista Weyr.
- Master Tirone is Masterharper during Moreta's time.
- Desdra is journeywoman healer and a student of a mastery during Moreta's time and lover of Capiam.
- Master Fortine is Capiam's second in command.
- Master Brace is Tirone's second in command.
- Macabir is Healer in Fort Hold's internment camp during the Plague (Moreta's time).
- Tuero is journeyman harper who is stranded at Ruatha during the Plague and becomes Ruatha's permanent harper.
- Balfor is Beastmaster elect at Keroon Hold. He was offered Beastmaster position, but refuses the offer because he thinks that he caused Moreta's tragic death.

At the time of Impression, male dragonriders' names are shortened with an apostrophe. This follows a tradition carried from the First Pass, as the dragons slurred the riders' names during Threadfall. For example, Famanoran became F'nor at his Impression.

Most women will only Impress gold queens, with the exception of a few female green riders, such as Mirrim, (and one blue rider, Xhinna) and queens fly in a wing of their own, with agenothree tanks to sear Thread from the skies. The first instance of 'agenothree' comes from Dragonsdawn, as Drake Bonneau slurred the name of the chemical compound HNO_{3}.

When asked why all dragons' names end in th, Anne McCaffrey replied: "Dragons have forked tongues. They lisp"; Pernese dragons have no vocal cords, and speak only telepathically.
