= Dragon (Dragonriders of Pern) =

Fictional race of dragons in Anne McCaffrey novels

The Dragons of Pern are a fictional race created by Anne McCaffrey as an integral part of the science fiction world depicted in her Dragonriders of Pern novels.

In creating the Pern setting, McCaffrey set out to subvert the clichés associated with dragons in European folklore and in modern fantasy fiction. Pernese dragons are similar to traditional European dragons in the fact that they can breathe fire and resemble great lizards or dinosaurs with wings, but the resemblance ends there. Unlike most dragons in previous Western literature, Pernese dragons are entirely friendly to humanity. Furthermore, they are not magical at all. Instead, they are a heavily genetically modified species based on one of Pern's native life-forms, the fire-lizard.

== History ==
In Dragonsdawn, the race was intentionally engineered to fight Thread, a deadly mycorrhizoid spore that devours all organic matter that it touches, after it first caught the human colonists on Pern with devastating results. Geneticist Kitti Ping Yung designed the dragons by manipulating the genetic code of the indigenous fire-lizards that had been acquired as pets by the colonists. The dragons were named after their resemblance to European dragons from the legends of old Earth. Later genetic manipulation by Ping's granddaughter, Wind Blossom, also resulted in the watch-whers, a nocturnal creatures who bore a slight resemblance to dragons. The later novels, set during the Third Pass, have shown the watch-whers as more useful than commonly thought in the novels set in the First Pass. On Pern, time is measured in "Turns", or years, and "Passes", which are about fifty Turns long, and occur when a planet named the "Red Star" is close enough to Pern for Thread to traverse space between the Red Star and Pern. Thread only falls during Passes. Periods between Passes, when the Red Star's orbit takes it away from Pern, are referred to as "Intervals", usually lasting about two hundred Turns. In the novels, "Long Intervals", of about four hundred and fifty Turns, have occurred twice. These Long Intervals have led the inhabitants of Pern to believe that Thread will never return.

== Physiology ==
Dragons are described as carnivorous, oviparous, warm-blooded creatures. Like all of Pern's native large fauna, they have six limbs: four feet and two wings. Their blood, referred to as ichor, is copper-based and green in color. Their head and general body type is described by McCaffrey as being similar in shape to those of horses. On their heads they have small headknobs, similar to those of giraffes, and no visible ears. They have multifaceted eyes that change color depending on the dragon's mood. Unlike the dragons of Terran legend, they have a smooth hide rather than scales; the texture of their skin is described as being reminiscent of suede with a spicy, sweet scent when clean. They are described as having forked tail ends with a defecation opening between the forks, but most artistic renderings depict their tails as having spade-shaped tips. The dragons usually get from one place to another by utilizing a teleportation process known as "going between".

Kitti Ping designed the dragons to gradually increase in size with every generation until they reached pre-programmed final dimensions. The dragons of the first Hatchings were not much bigger than horses. By the Sixth Pass (1500 years later) they had reached their programmed size and remained at that size until a single isolated dragon population suffered severe inbreeding, resulting in much larger beasts. In the Ninth Pass, in which most of the novels have been set, the largest Pernese dragon on record, Ramoth, hatched. According to the novel All the Weyrs of Pern, these dragons were roughly three times the size of the largest first-generation dragons. Ramoth's great size is often attributed to mutation and the genetic isolation of Benden Weyr for over 400 years (or Turns). Ramoth, at full length, was forty-five meters long, but according to Anne McCaffrey, her dragons are measured in feet and not meters. Ramoth was intended by the author to be 45 feet long. As referenced in her quote from the 1979 documentary series "Time Out of Mind - Episode 4: Anne McCaffrey": "...well you'd want to catch a parasite that just burrowed and fed on any living thing, before it hit the ground and there was your rationale for dragons. But you couldn't have small dragons you'd have to have big ones so I decided 35-40ft that seems an economical size". In All the Weyrs of Pern, AIVAS, an artificial intelligence, notes that all of the primary Benden dragons, Ramoth, Mnementh and Canth, are notably larger than Kitti Ping's specified end-size of the dragon species. Newly hatched dragons are the size of very large dogs or small ponies, and reach their full size after eighteen months. Because young dragons grow so fast, their riders must regularly apply oil to their hides to prevent the skin from cracking or drying out.

Dragons, like their fire-lizard ancestors, can breathe fire by chewing a phosphine-bearing rock, called "firestone" in the novels, which reacts with an acid in a special "second stomach" organ. This forms a volatile gas that can be exhaled at will and ignites upon contact with air. The flame is used to burn Thread from the sky before it reaches the ground, but the chewed firestone must be expelled from the body after it is used up, as the dragons cannot digest it.

== Psychic abilities ==
Despite their relatively low intelligence, fire-lizards communicate through a form of weak telepathy. They also imprint on the first individual who feeds them after they hatch, creating a telepathic bond with them; the Pernese call this phenomenon "Impression". In creating dragons, Kitti Ping intensified the creatures' telepathy, greatly increased their intelligence, and gave them a strong instinctive drive to Impress to a human. Upon hatching, each dragonet chooses one of the humans present (usually) and Impresses to that person; from that moment on, the pair are in a constant state of telepathic contact for as long as they both live. Dragons also use telepathy to communicate with each other and with fire-lizards. They are capable of speaking telepathically to humans besides their own riders, but not all of them will do so except under unusual circumstances.

Dragons and fire-lizards can also teleport. They do this by briefly entering a hyperspace dimension known as between. Both humans and dragons experience between as an extremely cold, sensory-deprived, black void. After spending no more than eight seconds in between, the dragon or fire-lizard can re-emerge anywhere on Pern, along with any passengers or cargo they carried. This ability is explained as having evolved in fire-lizards as a defense against Thread; not only does it allow them to quickly escape from Threadfall, but the intense cold of between kills any Thread that has already burrowed into them. If a dragon attempts to teleport without a clear mental image of the place where they intend to reappear, they may simply fail to emerge from between and thus, be gone forever.

Going between allows dragons to travel through time as well as space, as long as they have a clear picture of what a particular place looked like (or will look like) at the desired time, but the practice is highly dangerous to both dragon and rider and is severely restricted. Existing in two places at once for extended periods of time, or in close proximity, causes severe weakness and psychological disturbance for humans but not for dragons, the effects of which are discussed in several novels. In addition, while teleporting through space always takes the same amount of time, when a dragon travels through time, the amount of time they spend in between increases depending on how far away in time the destination is. Thus, traveling to remote times poses severe dangers from hypothermia and oxygen deprivation. In the first Pern novel, Dragonflight, Lessa passes out after having travelled back more than four hundred Turns.

The Dragonlover's Guide to Pern states that dragons defecate while between. This idea originated with a statement by Anne McCaffrey herself, in answer to a fan's question about the subject at a fan convention, but McCaffrey may have been joking when she first said this. As the idea has never been referenced in any of the Pern novels (in fact, defecation was mentioned only a few times in all of the books ever written in the Pern series), it cannot be considered definitively canonical. The Skies of Pern references the use of dragon dung as a repellent against the large felines inhabiting the southern continent.

Dragons are also capable of telekinesis, though this ability is unknown and used in an unconscious manner (to augment flight) until it is discovered as a conscious ability by the green dragon Zaranth and her rider Tai in the thirty-first Turn of the Ninth Pass. It is speculated that the undersized wings were intentionally created in the dragons by Kitti Ping to reduce the surface area of a dragon that is exposed to possible Thread injury, and that the telekinetic abilities were intended to make up for the loss of wingsail. It is said in many books that a dragon can carry whatever it thinks it can carry. This is likely an extension of the telekinesis, mentally "lifting" the extra load. This is the most likely explanation for the great loads that dragons sometimes carry during emergencies.

== Psychology ==
Unlike their fire-lizard ancestors, dragons are fully sentient. They can communicate fluently in human language (although only telepathically), and have personalities and opinions distinct from those of their riders, but their intelligence does seem to be somewhat lower than that of the average human. In particular, their long-term memory is severely limited.

Dragons' telepathic communication is usually limited to contact with their rider and with other dragons, but a dragon sometimes communicates well with a person with whom their rider has close emotional ties. They do understand spoken human language and occasionally reply telepathically to people whom they choose to speak.

As a safeguard against the possible damage that could be caused by such powerful creatures, Ping engineered dragons to be profoundly psychologically dependent on their riders. Any dragonet that fails to Impress to a human shortly after hatching will die. If a dragon's rider dies, the dragon immediately suicides by going between without a destination. The only exception is when the rider of a queen dragon dies while the queen is gravid; the dragon waits just long enough to lay her eggs and see them hatch before disappearing between. Humans who lose their dragons typically commit suicide as well, but some do survive, although the experience leaves profound psychological trauma.

Ping also designed the dragons to be fairly calm in temperament. They never fight one another, unless two queens come into estrus at the same time. They are also not dangerous to humans except shortly after hatching, when it is common for confused and frightened dragonets to maul or even kill humans hoping to Impress.

When a dragon hatches, they announce their names to their new riders upon Impression. Pernese dragons' names always end in -th, while a watch-wher's name will end in "sk".

== Colors ==
In Pern novels, barring rare mutations, female dragons and fire-lizards are always either green or gold in color, while males are blue, brown or bronze.

- Gold dragons, also called queens, are the largest dragons (40–45 feet or meters long) (Note: There is great contention with regard to what measurement system to use for the dragons of Pern. Some sources cite the size in feet, and others in meters, without changing the actual numbers. Since 45 meters is the equivalent of 147.63 feet, the difference is not trivial.: "Dragon Anatomy". Jenaith's Weyr. January 1, 2002. Archived from the original on 2009-01-13.; "The Dragon's Body". Star Stones' Dragonhealing. Archived from the original on 1999-10-02.) and the only fertile females. Gold dragons are by far the rarest dragons on Pern, at just less than one percent of the population. They are dominant over all other colors; any non-gold dragon will invariably obey a queen's orders, even against the wishes of its own rider. Queens are incapable of digesting firestone and producing flame, but they do fight Thread, as they fly in the lowest wing, with their riders armed with specially designed flamethrowers to flame any Thread missed by the wings flying above. An egg that is going to hatch a gold dragon is gold-colored and larger than other eggs. A gold dragon will always Impress a heterosexual female and are believed by most Weyrfolk to prefer young women who were not raised in the Weyr.
- Bronze dragons are the largest males (35–45 feet or meters long), although they are generally significantly smaller than the queens. Bronzes account for about five percent of all dragons. They are almost always the ones to mate with queens, as the smaller colors generally lack the stamina to chase and catch the gold dragons when they rise to mate. Due to the 5-1 bronze/gold ratio and the infrequency of gold mating flights, they often mate with greens (the losers of a gold flight almost always seek a green for their needs), but their size often puts them at a disadvantage in chasing the agile, smaller females. The senior bronze of a Weyr is determined through which bronze wins the mating flight of the senior gold. In the novels, the rider of a bronze dragon is always a heterosexual male.
- Brown dragons are smaller in size (30–40 feet or meters long), and about fifteen percent of all dragons are brown. They may occasionally mate with queens, but this is rare, and becomes even more rare as the dragons increase in size; by Ramoth's time in the Ninth Pass it is unheard of. All brown riders in the Pern novels are men and most are heterosexual, but bisexual or "masculine" homosexual brown riders are not rare.
- Blue dragons are the smallest males (24–30 feet or meters long) and make up about a third (thirty percent) of all dragons on Pern. They are nearly as agile as greens, but unlike the greens, they often have enough stamina to last for an entire Threadfall. They mate only with greens, as they are simply too small to keep up with a massive queen over a long mating flight. There are few prominent blue dragons or blue riders in the books. Some assume the position of teaching the new riders after their Impression. Blue riders are typically homosexual or bisexual, though some are heterosexual. In interviews, McCaffrey stated that homosexual women may be able to Impress a blue dragon. In the later books written with her son, Todd McCaffrey, blue Tazith is ridden by Xhinna, the first female weyrleader and the first female rider of a blue dragon.
- Green dragons are the smallest (20–24 feet or meters long), and make up about half of all dragons on Pern (fifty percent). They are female, but unlike the queens, they are infertile—due to the chronic use of firestone—and can produce flame. They are extremely valuable in Threadfall because of their agility, but they lack the stamina to last an entire Fall and generally fly in two or three shifts. Originally, greens Impressed only girls, but after various natural disasters and plagues decimated Pern's population, women were needed to help repopulate the planet. Since going between during pregnancy can induce miscarriage and because removing pregnant riders from the Wings reduced the effectiveness of the Wings, it became impractical to present large numbers of women as candidates for Impression. Thus, green dragons began Impressing homosexual boys; by the time of the end of the Second Pass, female green riders were becoming rare. By the time of Moreta in the Sixth Pass, female green riders were entirely forgotten, although greens gradually begin Impressing to women again in the Ninth Pass. Females of any sexual orientation may Impress green.
- There is only one white dragon mentioned anywhere in the Pern novels: Ruth, whose rider is Lord Jaxom of Ruatha Hold. He is not an albino, as his hide contains very faint patches of all the normal dragon colors. Ruth's egg would not have hatched if Jaxom had not forced it open and released the dragonet from a thick membrane sac; thus, it seems likely that white coloration in dragons is normally a lethal mutation. Although his parents are the largest queen, Ramoth, and largest bronze, Mnementh, in the history of Pern, Ruth is smaller than even a normal green dragon in his time; he is only slightly larger than the largest dragons of the first generation. While his exact length is never specifically mentioned in the books, it does state that he stands higher than a runnerbeast (horse) at the shoulder, and extrapolations suggest that he might be 18 feet or meters long. He is male or neuter (undetermined), and assumed sterile, with no urge to mate. Ruth also has the unusual ability to intuitively orient himself in time.

The larger a color is, the less common it is. For instance, there are more blues than browns, and there are more browns than bronzes. Half the dragon population is female, with green dragons being roughly fifty percent of the population and golds being one percent or slightly less.

Riding a larger color of dragon confers higher social status in Pern's extremely hierarchical society, color rankings following the dragons' own strict instinctual hierarchical organization based on fire-lizard structures. Perhaps as a result of this, it is commonly believed that the larger colors are more intelligent, although recent novels imply that this may not be true.

The Pernese believe that chewing firestone makes female dragons sterile; they therefore refuse to allow queens to use it. Greens, on the other hand, are so common that if they produced offspring it would quickly lead to overpopulation. They always chew firestone, and because of their numbers and agility they are vital to any Thread-fighting force. Dragonsdawn, however, suggests that Kitti Ping—possibly motivated by old-fashioned ideas about gender roles—deliberately engineered greens to be infertile and gold dragons to be incapable of producing flame in order to protect the gold dragons, the only reproductively fertile females, from the dangers of Thread fighting.

== Mating and reproduction ==
=== Mating ===
Both gold and green dragons experience a periodic mating urge. During a Pass a gold dragon will rise roughly once per Turn, and more often at the beginning of a Pass, yet less often towards the end of a Pass. During an Interval a gold dragon may rise to mate only once every four or five Turns. Greens will rise to mate three or four times a Turn, but whether this increases or decreases depending on whether or not it is a Pass is unknown. Greens will mate with any male, usually blues or browns. As they are smaller and have less stamina, a green mating flight is much shorter than a gold one.

When a female comes into Estrus, interested males compete to catch her in a mating flight. Usually, the female chooses the male who impresses her the most with his skill in the flight, although inexperienced females may be caught before making their choice. The pair actually mate in midair; thus, the higher they get during the flight, the longer their mating can last. The Pernese commonly believe that longer matings result in larger clutches. For this reason, queen riders are strongly encouraged to restrain their dragons from eating heavily just before a flight, instructing them to drink blood instead for a quick burst of energy.

=== Effects on rider sexuality ===
Due to the intense psychic bond between rider and dragon, dragonriders are overcome by the powerful emotions and sensations associated with mating flights. The riders of the mating pair engage in sex themselves, to varying degrees unaware of what they are doing. This contributes to a much looser attitude toward sexuality in general among dragonriders than in the rest of Pernese society.

For much of Pern's history, all green riders were male. During these periods, all green mating flights resulted in homosexual intercourse between the riders of the dragons involved. This homosexual intercourse is accepted in the Weyr as being separate from the rider's sexual orientation unless the rider has shown otherwise. Mating flight sex between two riders, one of whom is not the other's chosen partner (known as a weyrmate) is not considered to be "cheating". It is understood within the Weyr that sex during mating flights is not optional for the rider. Anne McCaffrey stated that "the dragon decides, the rider complies". Dragons do not usually consider the orientation of their riders when considering what female they wish to chase, or, for a female dragon, what male dragon might catch her. A primary example of this behavior is between Weyrleader T'gellan, Weyrwoman Talina, and green rider Mirrim. T'gellan and Mirrim are weyrmates, but T'gellan's bronze dragon must mate with Weyrwoman Talina's gold dragon at least yearly in order for T'gellan to maintain his position as Weyrleader. Mirrim, known to be an extremely acerbic and temperamental rider, shows no jealousy or other problem with her weyrmate's regular sexual contact with Talina.

=== Effects on non-rider sexuality ===
Both green and gold dragons broadcast their sexual feelings on a wide band during mating flights. Weyrfolk tend to become somewhat inured to this and therefore can hold their sexual reactions until an appropriate place and time. Flights, however, are usually not over the Weyr itself and sometimes the flight path of the mating flight brings the mating dragons over Holds or Farmholds where the average people occasionally find themselves engaged in unexpected activities. This is especially common among young teens working out in the fields who react to the sudden, unexpected and overwhelming urges with potentially embarrassing results.

Riders of the losing dragons usually seek sexual relief after the intense flight; if they do not have a chosen partner they may seek the comfort of any willing and available partner of their sexual orientation. The weyrfolk tend to happily accommodate these riders, especially if they have been affected by the flight's sexual urgency. This is one of the major reasons for the Weyr's reputation for being sexually very open.

== Fandom considerations ==
Anne McCaffrey has stated in a number of documents and interviews that dragonets use pheromones to determine the sexual orientation of the humans to whom they Impress. According to these statements, greens Impress only to women or to "effeminate" homosexual men. Blues Impress primarily to homosexual or bisexual men with "masculine" temperaments, or possibly to masculine or lesbian women; browns similarly Impress primarily to heterosexual men, but sometimes to bisexual men. Bronzes and golds Impress exclusively to heterosexual men and heterosexual women, respectively.

These ideas, however, have never been made explicit in the books (although it is clear, at least, that most male green and blue riders are homosexual). Many members of online Pern fandom find McCaffrey's ideas about sexuality highly questionable for a number of reasons, both scientific and ethical. Most infamously, she claimed in an interview that science has proven that being the receptive partner in anal sex triggers a hormonal change that will make a previously heterosexual man become homosexual and effeminate. Thus, she argues, even if a male green rider were originally heterosexual, he would not stay that way. In later interviews McCaffrey claims that green dragons merely pick up on psychological clues from homosexual boys before they themselves know that they are homosexual.

Pern-based roleplaying games thus sometimes ignore McCaffrey's restrictions on who can Impress to a given color of dragon. MUDs and fanzine-based clubs often ignore everything except the basic rule that only women Impress gold and only men Impress bronze; PBEM games are more likely to accept the restrictions on sexual orientation. Most clubs post their policy on canon strictness. While some accept more liberal thoughts on color/gender/sexual orientation matches, many are very strict on this issue.

For the purposes of roleplaying games, McCaffrey has also officially allowed females (masculine lesbians) to ride browns or blues, though she insists that this could never happen on her (canon) Pern.

Also in fandom, if a rider has strong objections to sex with someone involved in a mating flight or the writer has objections to writing a homosexual encounter or object to their character being involved in a sexual encounter with a person other than their "significant other", they may sequester themselves with a more acceptable partner during the flight. This idea is called "Stand-Ins" and based on a concept that McCaffrey introduced in Dragonseye (or Red Star Rising), in which a female green rider objects to the idea of a specific bronze rider winning her green's mating flight, but this concept is not seen in other books and clearly does not exist in the Ninth Pass, as several problems arise regarding green and gold riders who object to the random nature of mating flights and end up raped by the male winner of the flight (most notably in The Skies of Pern).

== Significance ==
As the primary line of defense against the Thread, dragons are a requirement for the survival and prosperity of humans and other land life on Pern, but the great beasts require a good deal of maintenance, to the degree of requiring a large part of Pernese infrastructure—especially cattle farming—to be centered around their upkeep. This has been known to cause resentment among those doing the supporting, especially in times when Thread is not falling.

== Significant Pernese Dragons ==
- Ramoth (gold) is ridden by Ninth Pass Benden Weyrwoman Lessa. Ramoth is the largest dragon in Pern's history, and together with Lessa rediscovers the lost knowledge that dragons are capable of time travel. She is described as having a beautiful mental voice in the short story The Girl Who Heard Dragons.
- Mnementh (bronze) is ridden by Ninth Pass Benden Weyrleader F'lar. Although significantly smaller than Ramoth, Mnementh is the largest bronze in the history of Pern. He is described as having a deep, rich mental voice.
- Canth (brown) is ridden by F'nor of Benden Weyr (F'lar's half-brother) during the Ninth Pass. He and F'nor make the first known attempt by the Pernese to teleport to the surface of another planet. Canth is also unusually large for his color – large enough to rival a small bronze in size – and is the first brown in centuries to attempt participation in a queen's mating flight.
- Ruth (white) is ridden by Lord Jaxom of Ruatha Hold during the Ninth Pass. Ruth is the only known white dragon in Pern's history, and the only dragon to be ridden by a reigning Lord Holder. He has a much higher intelligence compared to that of many other dragons, and always knows when as well as where he is in time and space.
- Orlith (gold) is ridden by Sixth Pass Fort Weyrwoman Moreta, who is one of the most famous dragonriders of Pernese history. Moreta's deeds are celebrated in the well-known song "The Ballad of Moreta's Ride".
- Faranth (gold) is ridden by First Pass Fort Weyrwoman Sorka Hanrahan. Faranth is not the first queen to hatch, mate or lay eggs (she was actually one of the last of her clutch) but she is the first Senior Gold, ridden by the first Weyrwoman. By later Passes, her status is confused with being the first gold in existence. Although Pern has no real religious beliefs, Faranth comes to occupy ambiguous status in later Pernese culture; "by the egg of Faranth" is a common oath.
- Path (green) is ridden by Mirrim of Benden Weyr during the Ninth Pass. Path is the first green in several centuries to Impress to a female rider, picking Mirrim when she was not a Candidate.
- Zaranth (green) is ridden by Tai of Monaco Bay after the ending of the Ninth Pass. Zaranth is the first Pernese dragon to consciously use telekinesis and communicate this ability to other dragons.
- Golanth (bronze) is ridden by F'lessan, son of Lessa and F'lar at the end of the Ninth Pass. F'lessan and Golanth are the first to create a Weyrhold, specifically Honshū Weyrhold, where dragons and their riders can live in smaller groups once Thread no longer falls on Pern, without relying on tithes.
