= The Renegades of Pern =

1989 novel by Anne McCaffrey

- Whelan cover of all US editions (Note: The Renegades of Pern title listing at the Internet Speculative Fiction Database lists cover artist Michael Whelan for all US editions, and is the same for Steve Weston (UK), three ISBN.)
- Author: Anne McCaffrey
- Cover artist: Michael Whelan; Steve Weston (UK)
- Language: English
- Series: Dragonriders of Pern
- Genre: Science fiction
- Publisher: Del Rey Books
- Publication date: October 1989
- Publication place: United States
- Media type: Print (hardcover & paperback)
- Pages: 384 (first hardcover)
- ISBN: 978-0-345-34096-2
- OCLC: 19555822
- Dewey Decimal: 813/.54 20
- LC Class: PS3563.A255 R4 1989
- Preceded by: Dragonsdawn
- Followed by: All the Weyrs of Pern

The Renegades of Pern is a science fiction novel by the American-Irish author Anne McCaffrey and the tenth book in the Dragonriders of Pern series. It was first published in 1989.

Like Nerilka's Story, The Renegades of Pern is a departure from the normal perspective for the Dragonrider books, presenting a parallel viewpoint, this time running concurrent with the original trilogy; the book begins at the time of Dragonflight and ends shortly after the ending of The White Dragon. It tells several stories, tied together by the figure of Thella, renegade sister of Larad (Lord Holder of Telgar Hold). The exploration of the Southern Continent and discovery of ancient human relics there (including the activities of Piemur and Menolly from the Harper Hall trilogy) also figure in the novel, which ends where All the Weyrs of Pern begins.
