= The Chronicles of Pern: First Fall =

1993 short story collection by Anne McCaffrey

Chronicles of Pern: First Fall
- Parkinson cover of early US editions (Note: The Chronicles of Pern: First Fall title listing at the Internet Speculative Fiction Database. • ISFDB lists Keith Parkinson (US) and Steve Weston (UK) cover artists for early editions, plus later covers by Michael Whelan (US) and Les Edwards (UK). Retrieved 2011-10-12.)
- Author: Anne McCaffrey
- Cover artist: Keith Parkinson; Steve Weston (UK)
- Language: English
- Series: Dragonriders of Pern
- Genre: Science fiction
- Publisher: Del Rey Books
- Publication date: October 1993
- Publication place: United States
- Media type: Print (hardcover)
- Pages: 306 (first US hardcover)
- ISBN: 978-0-345-36898-0
- OCLC: 27814162
- Dewey Decimal: 813/.54 20
- LC Class: PS3563.A255 C47 1993
- Preceded by: All the Weyrs of Pern
- Followed by: The Dolphins of Pern

The Chronicles of Pern: First Fall is a 1993 collection of short fiction by the American-Irish author Anne McCaffrey. All five stories are set on the fictional planet Pern; First Fall is one of two collections in the science fiction series Dragonriders of Pern.

== The collection ==
The First Fall stories are united by the setting: they span a period from before humans arrived and the first few decades of settlement in the southern continent. Generally the stories are about the relocation and reorganization of the southern colony in response to the "First Pass" of the "Red Star", an erratic planet that periodically brings a biological menace, in the form of falling Thread. The twelfth Dragonriders of Pern book, First Fall, shares its early setting only with one previously published book in the series, Dragonsdawn (1988). McCaffrey places Dragonsdawn and First Fall in a perspective of the ancient history of Pern. (Note: The period of the so-called Red Star is 250 years, and all Pern fiction is set just before or during a Pass, roughly a multiple of 250 years "After Landing" (AL). Prior to First Fall, McCaffrey set six books in the Ninth Pass, about 2500 AL; followed by two in the Sixth Pass, about 1500 AL; then Dragonsdawn (First Pass) and two more in the Ninth Pass. • Landing and events of the First Pass were universally forgotten, and the higher knowledge of the colony entirely lost, long before the Sixth Pass.)

First Fall was published simultaneously in the US and the UK, by Del Rey Books and Bantam UK, each edition with different cover art. Three of the five stories were previously published, two as small books.

The first and last stories show from FSP perspectives the explanation for Pern's unusual relation to the Federation of Sentient Planets: colonized, but left entirely alone for thousands of years.

=== The Survey: P.E.R.N. ===
First published as "The P.E.R.N. Survey" in Amazing Stories, September 1993.

In the story, a team of FSP scientists scout a distant planet. Time is too short to resolve some mysteries, but they find it safe for human settlement, with resources to support residents but inadequate for commercial exploitation. Their report is coded P.E.R.N.^{c} meaning Parallel Earth, Resources Negligible, recommended for colonization.

=== The Dolphins' Bell ===
Published two months earlier as a 157-page Wildside Press book (1993)

Mariner and former starship captain Jim Tillek organizes and leads the evacuation of "Landing", the original site of the Pern colony where many people still live, and most equipment and durable supplies are stored. One purpose is to take refuge from Threadfall in stone caverns of the Northern Continent, but the immediate threat is a local volcanic eruption. Lacking fuel or capacity for air transport, with few big boats, the colony must also use coastal and river craft that are not seaworthy. With the help of dolphin partners, most of the goods and almost all the people are dramatically secured.

"The Dolphins' Bell" provides another perspective on a major episode in Dragonsdawn, part three ("Crossing").

=== The Ford of Red Hanrahan ===
Original to the collection

Years after the colony secured refuge in "Fort Hold" by expanding a cavern system on the Northern Continent, venerable animal husbandman Red Hanrahan leads the establishment of a second hold, a few days north in the same mountain range. The migrating people and livestock face the dangerous crossing of a rising river at "Red's Ford", which gives its name to the second city: Rua Atha (Irish Gaelic), later Ruatha Hold.

=== The Second Weyr ===
Original to the collection

Years after the first dragon–rider couples move out of Fort Hold and establish Fort Weyr in a nearby volcanic crater, young queen dragonrider Torene leads the establishment of another draco-human community in a crater far to the north and east, the most distant habitable region. The leaders of Fort Weyr, Sorka Hanrahan and Sean Connell, authorize three new Weyrs at once, but the northeastern is first, named Benden Weyr for the Pern colony's founder and leader Admiral Paul Benden.

The action at Fort and Benden Weyrs continues Dragonsdawn by showing more of the earliest development of Pern's interspecies society.

=== Rescue Run ===
Published two years earlier as a 126-page Wildside Press book (1991) and also in Analog, August 1991

"Rescue Run" follows on from an event described in Dragonsdawn: the unauthorized launch of a distress beacon by a group of dissidents who believed that the colony was doomed. Decades later, shortly after the end of the First Pass, this beacon is picked up by a starship in the vicinity of Pern, and a landing party—under the command of Lieutenant Ross Benden, nephew of the Admiral who commanded the Pernese colonization fleet—is sent to respond. A quick survey by Lt. Benden's party finds no sign of human habitation on the Northern Continent, where the colony has taken refuge in caverns, and finds only one surviving family group in the South, at "Honshu" excavation. The now-elderly Stev Kimmer, a greedy and corrupt original colonist, rules over Honshu and his adopted family with an iron fist. He persuades Lt. Benden that he and the others in Honshu are the only survivors of the biological and geological disaster (i.e. Threadfall), and that they are a group small enough to evacuate entirely. Benden agrees despite his suspicions of Kimmer's true nature, only furthered by speaking to the family that had long lived under his domination, as well as Kimmer's all but openly hostile attitude towards himself (as Kimmer holds Benden's long-dead uncle personally responsible for the "destruction" of the colony). The rescue is dramatically successful, though Kimmer is killed when he is shot out of an airlock (implied to have been "accidentally" opened by one of his "family" members). Scientific investigation of Thread, as well as the belief that there are no other humans on the planet, as none of the Honshu refugees could refute Kimmer's claim that they were the last survivors of the Pern colony, leads the Federation to place Pern under strict interdict; the system is considered quarantined and all contact is forbidden.
