= Dragon Riders: Chronicles of Pern =

2001 video game

- Developer: Ubi Studios UK
- Publisher: Ubi Soft
- Designer: Oliver Sykes
- Series: Dragonriders of Pern
- Platforms: Dreamcast, Windows
- Release: Dreamcast: NA: August 8, 2001; PAL: February 8, 2002; PC: NA: August 12, 2001
- Genre: Adventure
- Mode: Single-player

Dragon Riders: Chronicles of Pern is an adventure game published by Ubi Soft in 2001.

The game takes place on the fictional planet Pern created by science fiction writer Anne McCaffrey for her Dragonriders of Pern series of novels. The story, divided into four chapters, follows the dragonrider D'kor who, with the help of his dragon Zenth, searches for girls to be candidates for Impressing a new young gold dragon. Various side-plots are developed throughout the game including a bit of intrigue involving an epidemic sickness that is somewhat reminiscent of the storyline in McCaffrey's novel Moreta: Dragonlady of Pern. The game contains over 120 locations on three continents. The player interacts and speaks with over 170 characters.

== Critical reception ==
Reception

Aggregate score
Aggregator	Score	
Aggregator	Dreamcast	PC
Metacritic	46/100	44/100

Review scores
Publication	Score	
Publication	Dreamcast	PC
Computer Games Magazine	N/A	1.5/5
GameSpot	6.2/10	4.9/10
GameSpy	N/A	33%
IGN	3.6/10	3.8/10
PC Gamer (US)	N/A	44%
PC Zone	N/A	63%

The game received "generally unfavorable reviews" on both platforms according to the review aggregation website Metacritic. The initial version also caused performance problems for users with Pentium 4 processors until a patch was released.

Several sites reviewed the PC version more positively, particularly praising the story. Games Domain called it "an absolute must for fans of the series – it's as engrossing and complex as the best of Anne McCaffrey's novels, and as a stand-alone story, it's fun and well worth it". Quandary said: "It's an absorbing adventure-cum-interactive story with a lot of people to converse with, a lot of good deeds to do, and an arch baddie to expose". The Dreamcast version was better received than the PC version, with GameSpot saying: "Dragonriders is hardly a terrible game, but it has its share of issues and won't appeal to a large group of gamers".
