= Dragonquest =

1971 novel by Anne McCaffrey

- Cover of the paperback original
- Author: Anne McCaffrey
- Cover artist: Gino D'Achille (early US editions) (Note: Dragonquest, ISFDB lists cover artist Gino d'Achille for all three US editions before 1978, and none for contemporary UK editions. Michael Whelan painted for new Del Rey (US) Dragonflight and Dragonquest editions in conjunction with his cover for first publication of The White Dragon, which completed the original trilogy (1978), as d'Achille had done for Dragonflight in conjunction with his cover for first publication of Dragonquest (1971). ISFDB names at least four others, of whom Chris Achilleos is first listed for any UK edition (1980).)
- Language: English
- Series: Dragonriders of Pern
- Genre: Science fiction
- Publisher: Ballantine Books
- Publication date: May 1971
- Publication place: United States
- Media type: Print (paperback original; 1973 hardcover)
- Pages: 333 (first)
- ISBN: 978-0-345-02245-5
- OCLC: 181089205
- LC Class: PS3563.A255 D76 x, 1971
- Preceded by: Dragonflight
- Followed by: Dragonsong

Dragonquest is a science fantasy novel by the American-Irish author Anne McCaffrey. It is the sequel to Dragonflight, set seven years later and the second book in the Dragonriders of Pern series. Dragonquest was first published by Ballantine Books in May 1971.

== Origins ==
According to her son Todd, McCaffrey's agent Virginia Kidd and editor Betty Ballantine provided crucial advice and assistance in her struggle with the sequel to Dragonflight. After the agent first read a draft, the author followed her advice to "burn it", and she met with the editor in long sessions. It was near completion before she emigrated to Ireland in September 1970, with her two younger children Todd and Georgeanne, one month after divorcing her husband. She finished it soon after the move.

== Plot summary ==
As it opens, tensions are rising between the Oldtimers, those dragonriders who came forward in time 400 turns (Pernese years) to help the undermanned contemporary dragonriders protect the planet Pern and its inhabitants from the destructive Thread. F'nor (rider of Canth, a Brown dragon that rivals the size of the Bronze dragons) attempts to mediate, but things escalate to the point that an Oldtimer, T'reb (who is disturbed by his green dragon being in heat), stabs F'nor, who is later sent to the Southern Continent to recover, where he falls in love with Brekke and discovers the wicked deeds of Weyrwoman Kylara. He also rediscovers the legendary fire-lizards from which dragons had been bred thousands of turns previously.

F'lar, F'nor's half-brother, is eventually forced into a duel with T'ron, the leader of the Oldtimers, which ends in banishment for the Oldtimers who will not accept F'lar's leadership and in a grave injury for F'lar. Brekke's queen dragon (Wirenth) rises in mating flight but is attacked by Kylara's queen dragon (Prideth), and both dragons die, leaving their riders in near-catatonic states. Only Brekke recovers, mostly because she can hear other dragons (besides her own queen, Wirenth).

With the Lords Holder adamant that the dragonriders attempt to eliminate Thread at its source, F'nor attempts to direct himself and his dragon, Canth, to the Red Star, but they find the atmosphere inhospitable, and they fall back to Pern, badly injured. Brekke's cry for F'nor not to leave her was also the inspiration for a song by Menolly, after she found that a certain guitar chord sounded amazingly like Brekke's voice when she screamed. This is chronicled in Dragonsinger.

== Awards ==
Dragonquest was one of six nominees for the 1972 Hugo Award for Best Novel (voted by participants in the annual World Science Fiction Convention) and it placed fifth for the 1972 Locus Award for Best Novel (voted by Locus magazine readers).

The American Library Association in 1999 cited the two early Pern trilogies (Dragonriders and Harper Hall), along with The Ship Who Sang, when McCaffrey received the annual Margaret A. Edwards Award for her "lifetime contribution in writing for teens".

== See also ==
- The Atlas of Pern (1984), a companion book produced by Karen Wynn Fonstad in consultation with McCaffrey.

== Sources ==
- McCaffrey, Todd (1999). Dragonholder: The Life and Dreams (So Far) of Anne McCaffrey by her son. New York: Ballantine Books. ISBN 978-0-345-42217-0.
