= The Dolphins of Pern =

1994 novel by Anne McCaffrey

- Morrill cover of all US editions (Note: The Dolphins of Pern title listing at the Internet Speculative Fiction Database lists only Rowena Morrill cover artist for US editions, and only Steve Weston for UK editions, three ISBN.)
- Author: Anne McCaffrey
- Cover artist: Rowena Morrill; Steve Weston (UK)
- Language: English
- Series: Dragonriders of Pern
- Genre: Science fiction
- Publisher: Del Rey Books
- Publication date: 6 September 1994
- Publication place: United States
- Media type: Print (hardcover & paperback)
- Pages: 340 (first US hardcover)
- ISBN: 978-0-345-36894-2
- OCLC: 30357873
- Dewey Decimal: 813/.54 20
- LC Class: PS3563.A255 D65 1994
- Preceded by: The Chronicles of Pern: First Fall
- Followed by: Dragonseye or Red Star Rising

The Dolphins of Pern is a science fiction novel by the American-Irish author Anne McCaffrey and the thirteenth book in the Dragonriders of Pern series.

The Dolphins of Pern was first published in 1994. The cover painting by Rowena Morrill was used again for the biography Anne McCaffrey: A life with dragons (Roberts 2007).

== Plot summary ==
This novel follows Dragonsdawn and the short story The Dolphin's Bell (short story contained in The Chronicles of Pern: First Fall) by discussing the present state (Ninth Pass) of the dolphins that were brought to Pern by the colonists. Set near the end and after the events of All the Weyrs of Pern it further integrates the science fiction aspects of the origins of the Pern series with the fantastical aspects presented by the original books.

The plot focuses primarily on two young characters and chronicles the birth of the Dolphincrafthall and its first Dolphineer. Readis, the Paradise River Lord Holder's son, is saved by talking dolphins ("shipfish") as a young boy after falling into the sea and subsequently develops a strong fascination with the dolphins. T'lion, the young Eastern Weyr dragonrider of Bronze Gadareth, also develops an interest after being involved in an early dolphin encounter. The two befriend each other due to their shared interest and, in their own ways, defy family, Hold and Weyr to maintain their friendships with dolphins and convince others of the dolphins' intelligence and ability to speak. While familiar characters struggle to end the era of Thread, Readis, T'lion and others struggle to begin a new era in which dolphin and human work together again.

Well-known characters from previous Pern novels are also involved in the plot, including Benden Weyrleaders Lessa and F'lar, and Masterharpers Robinton and Menolly.
