= Dragonriders of Pern (boardgame) =

Book-based boardgame

Dragonriders of Pern boardgame
- Designers: Sam Lewis
- Illustrators: David B. Bromley; Jim Clouse; Tim Hildebrandt; Michael Whelan; Robin Wood
- Publishers: Mayfair Games
- Publication: 1983
- Players: 1–7 players
- Playing time: 120 min.

Dragonriders of Pern is a board game that originated in the United States in 1983 created by Anne McCaffrey. The plot is based on the series Dragonriders of Pern.

== Reception ==
Aaron Allston reviewed Dragonriders of Pern for Fantasy Gamer magazine and stated that "in the final analysis, I'd recommend Dragonriders of Pern first, foremost, and only to die-hard fans of the series and to McCaffrey completists. The game mechanics are too simple, luck-oriented, and occasionally arbitrary (witness the Duel rules) to be of much interest to adventure gamers not fascinated by the novels. This is not to speak ill of the game; I'll wish it a long and merry life in its chosen market, and keep a copy beside my Weathered McCaffrey novels".

Nic Grecas reviewed Dragonriders of Pern for White Dwarf #52, giving it an overall rating of 4 out of 10, and stated that "this is a game which lacks those crucial ingredients - enjoyment and excitement. In a game which has these, almost anything else can be forgiven, eg rotten artwork, unclear rules, complex and unwieldy game mechanics, high price, or 'historical inaccuracy'. In their absence, even the most lavishly illustrated, innovative game is a failure to be played once and no more".

== Reviews ==
- Science Fiction Chronicle
- Analog Science Fiction and Fact
