= Dragonriders of Pern =

Science fantasy series by Anne McCaffrey

- Dragonflight; Dragonquest; The White Dragon; Dragonsong; Dragonsinger; Dragondrums; Moreta: Dragonlady of Pern; Nerilka's Story; Dragonsdawn; The Renegades of Pern; All the Weyrs of Pern; The Dolphins of Pern; Red Star Rising; The Masterharper of Pern; The Skies of Pern; Dragon's Kin; Dragon's Fire; Dragon Harper; Dragon's Time; Sky Dragons; Dragonsblood; Dragonheart; Dragongirl; The Chronicles of Pern: First Fall; A Gift of Dragons; Dragon's Code
- Country: USA
- Language: English
- Genre: Science fiction
- Publisher: Ballantine Books; Atheneum Books; Bantam Books; Del Rey Books
- Published: 1967–2018
- No. of books: 23+

Dragonriders of Pern is a science fantasy series written primarily by American-Irish author Anne McCaffrey, who initiated it in 1967. Beginning in 2003, her middle child Todd McCaffrey has written Pern novels, both solo and jointly with Anne. The series (as of 2024) comprises 24 novels and two collections of short stories. (Note: The 26 books (as of 2022) are distinct: they exclude omnibus editions and the separate publication as books of the longest works later collected or incorporated. The short stories not collected are "Beyond Between" by Anne McCaffrey (2003) and "The Impression" (1989) by Jody Lynn Nye and Anne McCaffrey. The last of 29 listings is one book "in progress" by her children.) The two novellas included in the first novel, Dragonflight, made McCaffrey the first woman to win a Hugo Award for writing fiction as well as the first to win a Nebula Award.

== Overview ==
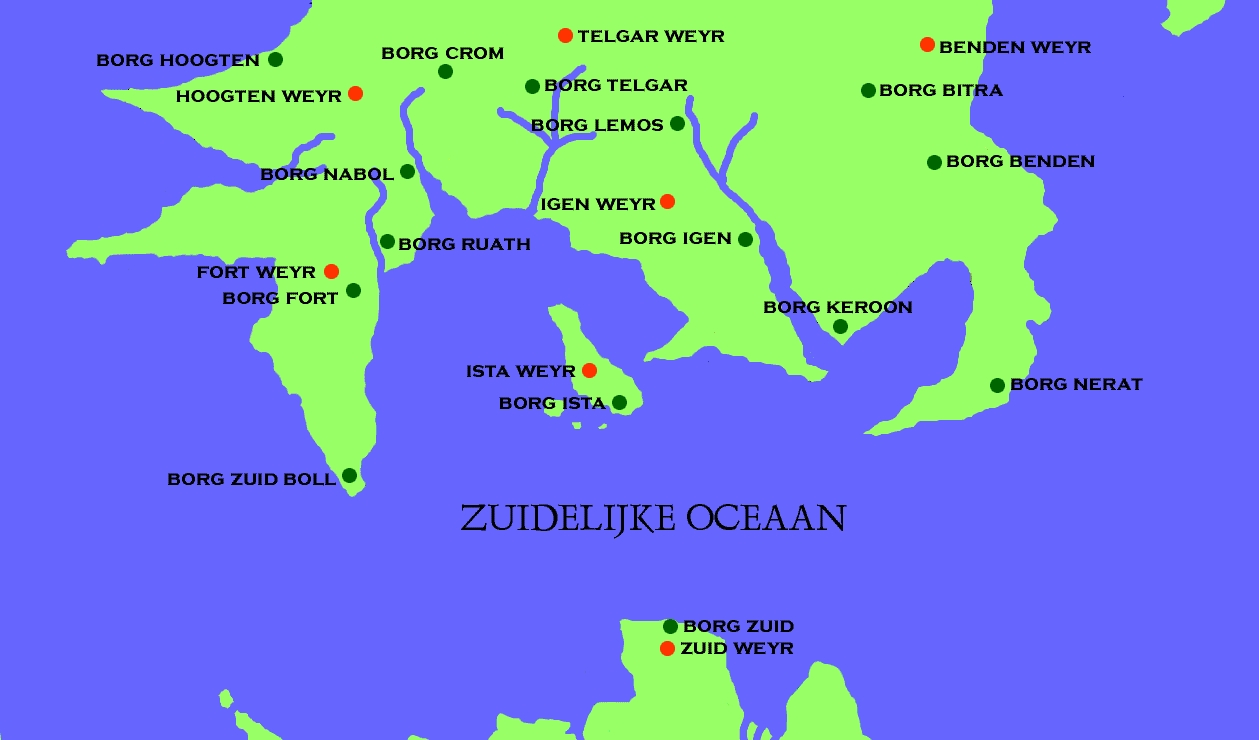
Map of the planet Pern

Humans have colonized the planet Pern in the Rukbat star system, but have lost much of their technology and history (including their origin on Earth) due to periodic onslaughts of Thread, a mycorrhizoid spore that voraciously consumes all organic material, including humans and their crops, given the opportunity. Thread comes from the Red Star, actually another planet. The Red Star has a 250-Turn (Pernese year) elliptic orbit around Rukbat, and when its orbit brings it close enough, Thread rains down on Pern at predictable intervals over about 50 Turns.

The Pernese use intelligent firebreathing dragons to fight Thread. A human rider has a telepathic bond with their dragon, formed by Impression at the dragon's hatching. The bonding instantly creates a very close, lifelong relationship – the dragon almost invariably commits suicide at the rider's death, and a rider whose dragon has died bears a deep emotional wound which can never be fully healed. Later books deal with the initial colonization of Pern and the genetic modification of small native animals into creatures capable of carrying humans in flight.

The Pernese live in a pre-industrial society, with lords, holds, harpers (musicians, entertainers, and teachers), and dragons, with occasional examples of higher technology (like flamethrowers, the telegraph, chemical fertilizers, and powerful microscopes and telescopes). There are four basic social classes: Weyrfolk (centered on Dragonriders) who live in Weyrs, Holders who rule Holds (cities, towns and farms), Crafters, and the Holdless who have no permanent home (including traders, displaced Holders, and brigands). The society resembles feudal Europe, but with some significant differences – especially, farmers are organized in their own guild, independent of the Holders – rather than being serfs as in historical feudal societies. Also, there is no formal religion and nothing like the Medieval Church, the closest equivalent being in fact the Dragonriders, who have an influential planet-wide organization and to whom a tithe is due.

The series as a whole covers over two and a half millennia.

== Publications by the McCaffreys ==
This list is arranged in publication order. For Pern historical order see the chronological list of Pern books.

There are 24 Dragonriders of Pern novels and two story collections, the latest published in 2018. Anne McCaffrey once requested reading the works in the order they were written. This differs greatly from Pern historical order, for several reasons. The McCaffreys have published stories set in several different periods of Pern's history from initial exploration to more than 2,500 years after landing (AL). Multiple stories feature the same events from different viewpoints. Some stories feature travel between times, even across centuries. Todd McCaffrey, writing alone or with his mother after 2002, has specialized in an early time period.

=== Original trilogy ===
These stories take place immediately before and during the Ninth Pass, about 2,500 years after landing (AL):

- Dragonflight, by Anne McCaffrey (1968; composed primarily of McCaffrey's first two Pern novellas, "Weyr Search" and "Dragonrider", which were originally published in Analog science fiction magazine, in the October and December 1967 issues respectively)
- Dragonquest (1971), by Anne McCaffrey.
- The White Dragon, by Anne McCaffrey (1978; although published prior to Dragondrums, The White Dragon continues the adventures of certain Dragondrums characters; McCaffrey recommended reading Dragonsong, Dragonsinger and Dragondrums before The White Dragon; The White Dragon incorporates McCaffrey's story "A Time When")

The trilogy was released 1978 in an omnibus edition titled The Dragonriders of Pern by Nelson Doubleday Science Fiction Book Club.

=== Harper Hall trilogy ===
These stories take place immediately before and concurrently with those depicted in Dragonquest and The White Dragon.

- Dragonsong (1976), by Anne McCaffrey
- Dragonsinger (1977), by Anne McCaffrey
- Dragondrums (1979), by Anne McCaffrey

The Harper Hall trilogy was released 1984 in an omnibus edition titled The Harper Hall of Pern by Nelson Doubleday Science Fiction Book Club. Dragonsong was subtitled "Volume One of The Harper Hall Trilogy" on the front cover of the Bantam Spectra edition, March 1986.

=== Other fiction by Anne McCaffrey ===
- Moreta: Dragonlady of Pern, by Anne McCaffrey (1983; both this and Nerilka's Story are set at the end of the Sixth Pass, centuries before the events in Dragonflight – Moreta is often referenced in Dragonflight as a semi-legendary heroic figure of the distant past whom the protagonist seeks to emulate)
- Nerilka's Story, by Anne McCaffrey (1986)
- Dragonsdawn, by Anne McCaffrey (1988; first in chronological order, it depicts the colonization of Pern, the First Fall of Thread, the creation of the dragons, and the colonists' move north)
- "The Impression", by Jody Lynn Nye and Anne McCaffrey (1989; short story original to The Dragonlover's Guide to Pern)
- The Renegades of Pern, by Anne McCaffrey (1989)
- All the Weyrs of Pern, by Anne McCaffrey (1991)
- The Chronicles of Pern: First Fall, by Anne McCaffrey (1993 collection of five stories, two original; set mostly after Dragonsdawn)
  - "The Survey: P.E.R.N." (originally published in 1993 as "The P.E.R.N. Survey")
  - "The Dolphins' Bell" (originally published in 1993)
  - "The Ford of Red Hanrahan" (original to the collection)
  - "The Second Weyr" (original to the collection)
  - "Rescue Run" (originally published in 1991)
- The Dolphins of Pern, by Anne McCaffrey (1994)
- Red Star Rising, by Anne McCaffrey (1996) (titled Dragonseye for U.S. release; set at the beginning of the Second Pass)
- The Masterharper of Pern, by Anne McCaffrey (1998; prequel to Dragonflight and the other works of the Ninth Pass)
- The Skies of Pern, by Anne McCaffrey (2001)
- A Gift of Dragons, by Anne McCaffrey (2002 collection of four stories, one original)
  - "The Smallest Dragonboy", by Anne McCaffrey (1973; short story previously collected in Get Off the Unicorn)
  - "The Girl Who Heard Dragons", by Anne McCaffrey (1986 fine press book; cover story in The Girl Who Heard Dragons (1994))
  - "Runner of Pern", by Anne McCaffrey (1998 novella original to Legends: Short Novels by the Masters of Modern Fantasy; set some time before the events of Dragonflight)
  - "Ever the Twain" (original to the collection; historical setting unclear)
- "Beyond Between" (2003 short story in Legends II: Short Novels By the Masters of Modern Fantasy; set after the events of Moreta)

"On Dragonwings", an omnibus containing Dragonsdawn, Dragonseye and Moreta, was published in 2003.

=== Books by Todd McCaffrey or both ===
Since 2003, Anne McCaffrey and her middle child Todd McCaffrey have developed the history immediately before and during the Third Pass, about 500 Turns after landing (AL):

- Dragon's Kin (2003, Anne and Todd McCaffrey; set prior to the Third Pass)
- Dragonsblood (2005, Todd McCaffrey; set after Dragon Harper and also 400 Turns earlier, a few decades after Dragonsdawn)
- Dragon's Fire (2006, Anne and Todd McCaffrey; set during and after Dragon's Kin)
- Dragon Harper (December 2007, Anne and Todd McCaffrey; set after Dragon's Fire)
- Dragonheart (November 2008, Todd McCaffrey; set during Dragonsblood)
- Dragongirl (July 2010, Todd McCaffrey; sequel to Dragonheart and Dragonsblood)
- Dragon's Time (June 2011, Anne and Todd McCaffrey; sequel to Dragongirl)
- Sky Dragons (July 2012, by Anne and Todd McCaffrey; sequel to Dragon's Time; published after Anne's death)

=== Book by Gigi McCaffrey ===
- Dragon's Code (2018, Gigi McCaffrey; set during the Ninth Pass)

=== Unfinished book ===
- After the Fall is Over (sequel to The Skies of Pern) – the only work set after the Ninth Pass in "New Era Pern"; the latest in Pern historical order.

== Awards ==
"Weyr Search" won the inaugural Hugo Award for Best Novella in 1968 and "Dragonrider" won the Nebula Award for Best Novella in 1969 (both were finalists for both awards). Dragonquest, The White Dragon, Moreta: Dragonlady of Pern and All the Weyrs of Pern were among the five annual finalists for the best novel Hugo Award.

Year	Award	Category	Recipient	Result	Ref.
1968	1967 Nebula Awards	Best Novella	"Weyr Search" (Note: The novella was later incorporated into Dragonflight, the first novel of the series.)	Nominated	
1968	1968 Hugo Awards	Best Novella	"Weyr Search"	Won	
1969	1968 Nebula Awards	Best Novella	"Dragonrider" (Note: The novella was later incorporated into Dragonflight, the first novel of the series.)	Won	
1969	1969 Hugo Awards	Best Novella	"Dragonrider"	Nominated	
1972	1972 Hugo Awards	Best Novel	Dragonquest	Nominated	
1972	1972 Locus Awards	Best Novel	Dragonquest	5	
1978	1978 Locus Awards	Best SF Novel	Dragonsinger	9	
1979	1979 Hugo Awards	Best Novel	The White Dragon	Nominated	
1979	1979 Locus Awards	Best Novel	The White Dragon	3	
1979	1979 Ditmar Awards	Best International Fiction	The White Dragon	Won	
1979	1979 Gandalf Awards	Best Book-Length Fantasy	The White Dragon	Won	
1980	1980 Locus Awards	Best SF Novel	Dragondrums	8	
1980	1980 Ditmar Awards	Best International Fiction	Dragondrums	Nominated	
1984	1984 Hugo Awards	Best Novel	Moreta: Dragonlady of Pern	Nominated	
1984	1984 Locus Awards	Best SF Novel	Moreta: Dragonlady of Pern	6	
1987	1987 Locus Poll	Best All-Time Fantasy Novel	Dragonflight	9	
1989	1989 John W. Campbell Memorial Award	Best SF Novel	Dragonsdawn	3	
1989	1989 Locus Awards	Best SF Novel	Dragonsdawn	7	
1992	1992 Hugo Awards	Best Novel	All the Weyrs of Pern	Nominated	
1992	1992 Locus Awards	Best SF Novel	All the Weyrs of Pern	5	
1994	1994 Locus Awards	Best Collection	The Chronicles of Pern: First Fall	10	
1995	1995 Locus Awards	Best Collection	The Girl Who Heard Dragons	7	
1995	1995 Locus Awards	Best SF Novel	The Dolphins of Pern	10	
1996	1996 Seiun Awards	Best Translated Long Form	The Renegades of Pern	Nominated	
2002	2002 Seiun Awards	Best Translated Long Form	All the Weyrs of Pern	Nominated	

== Other works ==
=== Gamebooks and companion books ===
- The Atlas of Pern (1984) by Karen Wynn Fonstad. ISBN 0-345-31432-8 ISBN 0-345-31434-4 – authorized "Pernography" including annotated maps; illustrated descriptions of Weyrs, Holds, and Halls; chronologies; and more.
- Dragonharper (1987), gamebook by Jody Lynn Nye
- Dragonfire (1988), gamebook by Jody Lynn Nye
- People of Pern (1988) by Robin Wood and Anne McCaffrey. ISBN 0-89865-635-4 – portraits and other illustrations
- The Dragonlover's Guide to Pern (Ballantine Books, 1989) by Jody Lynn Nye with Anne McCaffrey. ISBN 0-345-35424-9. Second edition 1997, ISBN 0-345-41274-5 – Pern geography, society, flora, fauna, etc., including information not in the previously published fiction.

=== Graphic novel ===
In 1991, Dragonflight, the first Pern book published, was released as a set of three graphic novels by Eclipse Comics of Forestville, California. The story was adapted across all three graphic novels by Brynne Stephens. The first two graphic novels were illustrated by Lela Dowling and Fred Von Tobel, the third by Lela Dowling and Cynthia Martin.

=== Music of Pern ===
There are two CDs of music relating to the Teaching Ballads and the works of Masterharper Robinton and Menolly.

The Masterharper of Pern was made in 1998 by Anglo-Alaskan duo Tania Opland and Mike Freeman in collaboration with Anne McCaffrey at her request, and features the music of Robinton. The project began as an idea to include written music in the book of the same name, printed on the inner faces of the cover. By the time the composers had written and auditioned the early drafts at the author's table it was clear that making the songs a reality to their creator's satisfaction was finally possible. The CD project was completed some eighteen months later (1998) and released to the approval of the author and fans of the series worldwide.

The second CD pertaining mainly to the work another Pernese harper, Menolly, was completed in December 2008. Entitled Sunset's Gold, this features Opland and Freeman with other musicians, and comprises twelve tracks of music recorded from 2006 to 2008. The CD includes the ballad "Four Hundred Turns" written by Anne McCaffrey shortly after she completed Dragonflight. It was placed in a desk drawer where it lay forgotten for almost forty years until the author rediscovered it just as the CD project was underway. It had never been seen or published before.

Songbooks are also available containing the music from the first CD, with a similar book for the second in the works.

=== Television and film adaptations ===
Prior to 1995, the motion picture and ancillary rights to the literary property were optioned by various entities, including Robert Mandell (for a cartoon series adaptation that was eventually redeveloped into Princess Gwenevere and the Jewel Riders) and Kerry Skogland.

In 1996, McCaffrey sold the motion picture rights to an Irish company, Zyntopo Teoranta, who entered into a co-production agreement with Alliance Atlantis, covering development including advanced 3D animation and compositing effects for television budgets. Distribution pre-sale efforts failed, and Zyntopo Teoranta entered into an agreement with Ronald D. Moore as showrunner to present the project to Warner Brothers Network.

In 2002, Warner Brothers Network and writer Ronald D. Moore had completed sets and casting for a pilot episode, and were within a few days of filming. Moore had sent the pilot episode to Warners for final approval. It was returned with so many changes to the basic structure of Pern - making it more like Buffy the Vampire Slayer and Xena: Warrior Princess - that it no longer much resembled the world created by Anne McCaffrey. As a fan of the Dragonriders of Pern series, Moore refused to continue. Filming was canceled, and rights ownership remained with Zyntopo Teoranta's assign, Kua Media Corporation (Canada).

In May 2006, rights to the entire Dragonriders of Pern series were optioned by Copperheart Entertainment. In April 2011, Copperheart signed David Hayter as screenwriter and Don Murphy as executive producer for a film version of Dragonflight; the production was expected to begin in 2012.

In July 2014, Warner Bros. optioned all 22 volumes of the series for a feature live-action film. Later in November, Warner Bros. hired author-screenwriter Sarah Cornwell to adapt the first installment of the series.

=== Games ===
There have been several games released based on the Pern series:

- In 1983, Mayfair Games created a board game Dragonriders of Pern featuring cards with Pern characters and locations. This game is now rare and valuable to Pern collectors.
- In 1984, Gallimard published Dragonriders of Pern: The Book Game, a game in which two players use illustrated books to resolve aerial engagement against the "threads".
- In 1983, Epyx released the video game Dragonriders of Pern for the Atari 8-bit computers and Commodore 64 in which the player could battle Thread and engage in diplomacy on Pern.
- In 2001, a video game Dragon Riders: Chronicles of Pern was created by Ubisoft for the PC and Dreamcast under license from Zyntopo Teoranta, the Irish corporation which owns the motion picture, gaming and ancillary rights. This game follows a dragonrider as he searches for young women to be candidates for impressing a new gold dragon, and battles the "bad guys" on an adventure across Pern.

McCaffrey threatened legal action against unauthorized text-based, online, role-playing game communities based on the Pern world. She approved of strict rules for the communities that cleared some of these MUDs. In the 1990s, PernMUSH was one such community. The community's rules discouraged straying out of character from the Pern world.

== Fandom ==
The Pern fandom consists of a large variety of fan communities. The largest part of the fandom is made up by clubs that allow their members to 'play' Pern by creating original characters within the setting of Anne McCaffrey's world. To avoid conflicts with Pern canon and trademarks, each club typically chooses a particular location and timeline as a unique setting different from Anne McCaffrey's established history of Pern. Most commonly, clubs are named for the main Weyr chosen as playing location.

Historically, the first clubs started out publishing printed fanzines containing fanfiction and artwork. With the advent of the internet, clubs using online technology such as roleplay via chat or email (PBeM) became popular. Text-based online virtual reality games, primarily MUSH and MUCK variants such as PernMUSH, have modeled Pern since the early 1990s. In the mid '90s, stringent rules were placed on the creation of new clubs and the governance of existing clubs, resulting in legal action against some fans. For example, no new fan-created MU* games were allowed while the game rights were licensed to Ubisoft for the development of the Dragon Riders: Chronicles of Pern computer game (released in 2001).

In November 2004, Anne McCaffrey relaxed her fandom rules significantly and allowed Pernese fanfiction to be posted freely throughout the Internet. Soon after, fanfiction sites such as FanFiction.Net started offering the opportunity to post and read fanfiction based on Anne McCaffrey's works. The relaxing of the rules also resulted in the appearance of message board–based games as another popular club type. Fan sites no longer require approval and are not bound to the formerly strict canon rules, resulting in fan clubs testing out alternatives such as new dragon colors or off-Pern scenarios.

From 2000 until 2005, Anne McCaffrey's website offered a popular discussion forum and chat (The Kitchen Table) for fans to interact with each other and with the author. After its discontinuation in January 2005, several fan-organized discussion forums have taken its place as an outlet for fan activity.

Offline, the largest Pern fan gathering was WeyrFest, held yearly at Dragon Con beginning in 1992. Anne and Todd McCaffrey were frequent attendees at WeyrFest, offering fans a chance to meet the authors in person. Anne was originally scheduled to attend the 2011 Dragon Con, but had deferred her appearance until the 2012 event due to heart problems, just a few months before her death in late November of that year. In 2013, Weyrfest was folded into Dragon Con's Fantasy Literature track, along with Robert Jordan's The Wheel of Time series.

== See also ==
- Characters in Dragonriders of Pern
