= Dragondrums =

1979 novel by Anne McCaffrey

- First edition
- Author: Anne McCaffrey
- Cover artist: Fred Marcellino (first); Colin Saxton (UK); and others (Note: Dragondrums title listing at the Internet Speculative Fiction Database identifies five cover artists for US editions and hosts at least thumbnail images of their front covers: Fred Marcellino, first edition; Elizabeth Malczynski, first paperback; Rowena Morrill, 1986 ppb; Greg Call, 2003 ppb; and Sammy Yuen, 2008 ppb. The first paperback did not credit Malczynski; the database cites her Elizabeth Malczynski Littman gallery where the first six works present her three paintings for wraparound covers of Dragonsong, Dragonsinger, and Dragondrums (the Harper Hall trilogy). • Official Pern Art maintained by Hans van der Boom identifies two cover artists responsible for all three books in French paperback editions, Didier Thimonier (Albin Michel, 1988/1989) and Wojciech Siudmak (Presses Pocket). The former earlier edition is entirely missing from ISFDB. Retrieved 2011-10-18. • Those two paragraphs pertain to all three books in the so-called Harper Hall trilogy, as the US and French editions used artists who "covered" all three books. • ISFDB identifies only Steve Weston among cover artists for UK editions. Official Pern Art identifies Colin Saxton (first UK), Weston (first UK paperback), and Les Edwards (later UK edition) and shows images of the Weston and Edwards cover paintings. Retrieved 2011-10-19.)
- Language: English
- Series: Dragonriders of Pern; Harper Hall Trilogy
- Genre: Science fiction; Young adult
- Publisher: Atheneum Books
- Publication date: March 1979
- Publication place: United States
- Media type: Print (hardcover & paperback)
- Pages: 240 (first edition)
- ISBN: 978-0-689-30685-3
- OCLC: 4498784
- LC Class: PZ7.M122834 Dm
- Preceded by: The White Dragon
- Followed by: Moreta: Dragonlady of Pern

Dragondrums is a young adult science fiction novel by the American-Irish author Anne McCaffrey. Published by Atheneum Books in 1979, it is the sixth book in the Dragonriders of Pern series.

Dragondrums completed the Harper Hall of Pern trilogy one year after The White Dragon completed the Dragonriders of Pern trilogy. Boxed and omnibus editions of both trilogies soon followed.

== Plot summary ==
Dragondrums is the coming of age story of Piemur, a small, quick, clever apprentice at Harper Hall. When Piemur's clear treble voice changes, his place among the Harpers is no longer certain. He is sent to the drum towers to learn drumming, the primary method of long-distance communication on Pern for non-dragonriders, while his voice settles. There he has to deal with the jealousy and bullying of the other drumming apprentices. When Masterharper Robinton secretly asks Piemur to be his apprentice, Piemur begins journeying through Pern, gathering information and running discreet errands for the Masterharper. In his adventures throughout Pern, Piemur has only his knowledge and wits to deal with a cruel Lord Holder and rogue dragonriders. He Impresses one of the coveted fire-lizards – a gold he names Farli – as a companion, discovers his place in the world, and earns journeyman status among the Harpers.

The events in Dragondrums take place after Dragonsinger and are contiguous with some events in The White Dragon, which discusses characters and events elsewhere on Pern.

== Awards ==
The American Library Association in 1999 cited these first six Pern books, along with The Ship Who Sang, when McCaffrey received the annual Margaret A. Edwards Award for her "lifetime contribution in writing for teens".

Dragondrums placed eighth for the annual Locus Award for Best Novel and it won the annual Balrog Award in the Novel class.
