= Moreta: Dragonlady of Pern =

1983 novel by Anne McCaffrey

- Whelan cover of Del Rey editions (Note: Moreta: Dragonlady of Pern title listing at the Internet Speculative Fiction Database lists Michael Whelan cover artist for numerous US editions, all except for Apr 2005 SFBC edition featuring Paul Youll; no listing for the first UK edition, thereafter Steve Weston (UK).)
- Author: Anne McCaffrey
- Cover artist: Michael Whelan; Steve Weston (UK)
- Language: English
- Series: Dragonriders of Pern
- Genre: Science fiction
- Publisher: Del Rey/Ballantine
- Publication date: November 1983 (US)
- Publication place: United States
- Media type: Print (hardcover & paperback)
- Pages: 286 (first US hardcover)
- ISBN: 978-0-345-29874-4
- OCLC: 9441838
- Dewey Decimal: 813/.54 19
- LC Class: PS3563.A255 M6 1983
- Preceded by: Dragondrums
- Followed by: Nerilka's Story

Moreta: Dragonlady of Pern is a science fiction novel by the American-Irish author Anne McCaffrey and the seventh book in the Dragonriders of Pern series.

With this book, McCaffrey jumped 1000 years back in Pern history from the setting of the first book, Dragonflight, to a time memorialized in song and rendered legendary from the standpoint of the previous books.

== Plot summary ==
The story begins with Moreta, the senior Weyrworman of Fort Weyr, traveling with her queen dragon Orlith (who is near the end of her pregnancy) to the Gather at Ruatha Hold. At the Gather there is talk about a strange animal that was on display at Ista that was found at sea, but Moreta is more interested in the runner races that are being held at the Gather. As she was hold bred she loves to watch runners race. While Moreta is watching the races with Alessan, the new Lord Holder, a runner suddenly collapses from having liquid in its lungs. No one knows why the runner comes down with such an illness. It is quickly taken off the field. After a few more races Moreta goes to the Dancing Square with Alessan's younger sister, Oklina.

When Moreta wakes up the next morning she is greeted with news from Weyrleader Sh'gall, who tells her that the disease is now an epidemic and is spreading very quickly across Pern. Masterhealer Capian has ordered a quarantine to try stopping the spreading of the disease. Moreta quickly gives out orders to isolate the Weyr, but it is too late as Berchar, the Weyr Healer, has already been infected with the disease.

Back at Fort Weyr, Moreta, even though there is quarantine upon them, has to get everyone ready for the next fall to protect Pern from Thread. When the Thread begins to fall the dragon riders take to the sky, protecting everyone from the Crom to Nabol. The sickness had spread so far and fast that the Weyrleaders met two days later to talk about what they should do next along with making a list of bronzeriders that could take control if they would die of the sickness and decide against exploring the Southern Continent anymore, since the animal found at sea was responsible for the sickness had come from there.

Capian continues to try to find a cure when he remembers a lecture he was given long ago by Masterharper Tirone. Capiam has an epiphany when he realizes that the blood of those who have recovered from the sickness like himself could be turned into a serum to cure others. They quickly start to make and deliver the serum to the sick. K'lon begins to deliver the serum and Leri realizes he been traveling through time, also known as "timing it", a secret only known by bronze and gold dragon riders, to be able to deliver all the serum quickly.

Upon realizing there would be a second wave of disease, Desdra points out a problem where they do not have enough needlethorn to vaccinate people with, along with the problem that it does not bloom until Autumn. Moreta then comes up with a plan to travel in time into the future so they could collect the needlethorn in Ista. Moreta along with B'lerion, Alessan, Oklina, Capiam and Desdra then travel secretly into the future to harvest the needlethorn.

The mass vaccination happens the next day with help from the dragon riders. Moreta's Queen dragon, Orlith, is heavy with new dragon eggs and so cannot fly Moreta between. Leri offers her own Queen dragon, Holth. When Moreta is done with visiting different holds she is exhausted and heads back with Holth, timing it to get there faster.

Back at the hatching grounds at Fort Weyr, K'lon, Rogeth and Leri waits for Moreta's along with Holth's return. Orlith suddenly bursts out shrieking. Rogeth tells him that Moreta and Holth failed to envision their destination properly due to exhaustion and have died between as a result.

A month later, everyone, including people from other Weyrs and their dragons, gather at Fort Weyr for the Hatching. Oklina was among the candidates and was chosen by the newly hatched queen dragon, Hannath. Just before the hatching Orlith goes between with Leri to be with their missing rider/dragon.

== Reception ==
Dave Pringle reviewed Moreta: Dragonlady of Pern for Imagine magazine, and stated that "those who are hooked on McCaffrey's brand of romanticism will pounce joyfully on this latest tome in the Dragonsaga. Others will shudder and avert their eyes".

Dave Langford reviewed Moreta: Dragonlady of Pern for White Dwarf #53, and wrote that "all the gimmicks recur- dragon telepathy, teleportation and time travel, excessive dragon cuteness, sugary scenes of 'Impression' in which boy/girl meets dragon, and a range of stock McCaffrey characters familiar from previous books, for all that Moreta is set 900 years earlier".

=== Awards ===
Moreta was one of five nominees for the annual Hugo Award for Best Novel and it placed sixth for the annual Locus Award for Best Novel.
