= Dragonseye =

1996 novel by Anne McCaffrey

Red Star Rising: Second Chronicles of Pern and (US) Dragonseye
- First edition (UK)
- Author: Anne McCaffrey
- Cover artist: Steve Weston (first); Eric Peterson (US) (Note: Red Star Rising title listing at the Internet Speculative Fiction Database lists cover artist Steve Weston alone for UK editions (Red Star Rising) and Eric Peterson alone for US editions (Dragonseye). Retrieved 2011-10-23.)
- Language: English
- Series: Dragonriders of Pern
- Genre: Science fiction novel
- Publisher: Bantam UK; Del Rey Books (US)
- Publication date: August 1996; January 1997 (US)
- Publication place: United Kingdom; (US as Dragonseye)
- Media type: Print (hardcover & paperback)
- Pages: 335 (first); 353 (first US)
- ISBN: 978-0-593-03770-6
- OCLC: 35650833
- Dewey Decimal: 813/.54 20
- LC Class: PS3563.A255 D77 1997
- Preceded by: The Dolphins of Pern
- Followed by: The Masterharper of Pern

Red Star Rising or Dragonseye is a science fiction novel by the American-Irish author Anne McCaffrey and the fourteenth book in the Dragonriders of Pern series.

Red Star Rising, or Red Star Rising: Second Chronicles of Pern, was published by Bantam UK in 1996. For release in the United States the following year it was retitled Dragonseye.

== Plot introduction ==
After the events of All the Weyrs of Pern, The Dolphins of Pern, and The Skies of Pern, Thread is less of a threat to the planet. Returning to an earlier time period in Pernese history, the author brings the earlier conflict of Thread reappearing in the Second Pass. The book is set about 250 years after the Landing (the original settlement on Pern) and consequently it only features characters which do not appear in other books of the series.

Following in the footsteps of the novels that established the background of the colony, the book exposes the incremental loss of technology due to the hardships of Thread, and inevitable progress towards the more feudal society shown later in the series timeline. It answers such questions as:

- What happened to the computers?
- What happened to the technology?
- Who created the Star Stones?

It also shows more about the process of caring for a newborn dragon than is shown in any of the other Pern books, and explores the ramifications of male riders of green dragons.

The main characters are Clisser (college head, Fort Hold), Chalkin (Lord Holder, Bitra), K'vin (weyrleader, Telgar), Zulaya (weyrwoman, Telgar), Iantine (journeyman artist) and Debera (green rider, Telgar).
