= Nerilka's Story =

1986 novella by Anne McCaffrey

- Herder cover of early US editions (Note: Nerilka's Story title listing at the Internet Speculative Fiction Database lists Edwin Herder cover artist for four early US editions. ISFDB does not identify an illustrator but the cover states "Illustrated by Edwin Herder". • ISFDB lists no UK edition except in Nerilka's Story & The Coelura. Listings for that collection include 1987 hardcover and paperback, evidently the first UK editions, and reference to all four listings reveals Steve Weston cover artist for all.)
- Author: Anne McCaffrey
- Illustrator: Edwin Herder
- Cover artist: Edwin Herder (first); Steve Weston (UK)
- Language: English
- Series: Dragonriders of Pern
- Genre: Science fiction
- Publisher: Del Rey Books
- Publication date: March 1986
- Publication place: United States
- Media type: Print (hardcover)
- Pages: 182 (first hardcover)
- ISBN: 978-0-345-33159-5
- OCLC: 15353896
- Preceded by: Moreta: Dragonlady of Pern
- Followed by: Dragonsdawn

Nerilka's Story is a science fiction novella by the American-Irish author Anne McCaffrey and the eighth book in the Dragonriders of Pern series.

Moreta (1983) and its sequel Nerilka (1985) are companion stories, in that the latter narrates a second perspective on major events of the former. It was the first work in the series following publication of The Atlas of Pern, and so is not covered in the Atlas.

== Plot summary ==
Taking a different approach from the previous seven books in the series, Nerilka's Story has a non-dragonrider and non-harper as its major viewpoint character. It is set during the events detailed in Moreta: Dragonlady of Pern. Nerilka is the daughter of a Lord Holder who turns her back on her life in an upper-class family and sets out to fight the disease that threatens to kill all humans on Pern. According to a critic for the Chicago Tribune, Nerilka makes for an "intelligent, resourceful, selfless and, alas, homely" heroine.

== Reception ==
Critics have called Nerilka a story with "terse power". It was first published in 1985. The novel reached #7 on Time Magazine's Best Sellers list for fiction on April 7 and 21, 1986. On the New York Times Best Seller list for paperbacks, it first appeared on February 22, 1987, at #12, and reached #11 the week after.
