= All the Weyrs of Pern =

1991 novel by Anne McCaffrey

- Weston cover of all UK editions (Note: All the Weyrs of Pern title listing at the Internet Speculative Fiction Database lists only Steve Weston (UK) and Michael Whelan (US) cover artists, each about four distinct ISBN.)
- Author: Anne McCaffrey
- Cover artist: Steve Weston (UK); Michael Whelan (US)
- Language: English
- Series: Dragonriders of Pern
- Genre: Science fiction
- Publisher: Bantam Books
- Publication date: 19 September 1991
- Publication place: United Kingdom
- Media type: Print (hardcover & paperback)
- Pages: 494 (first UK hardcover)
- ISBN: 978-0-593-02224-5
- OCLC: 154683260
- Preceded by: The Renegades of Pern
- Followed by: The Chronicles of Pern: First Fall

All the Weyrs of Pern is a science fiction novel by the American-Irish author Anne McCaffrey. Published in 1991, it is the eleventh book in the Dragonriders of Pern series.

== Plot summary ==
The story follows immediately from the final scene of Renegades of Pern, in which the Admin building from Pern's first generation of colonists is discovered, along with an advanced computer called AIVAS (Artificial Intelligence Voice Address System), at the Landing site that is being excavated. AIVAS has remained undisturbed since the events of Dragonsdawn some 2500 years earlier and, in addition to holding a huge volume of stored information long since lost to the Pernese society, claims to be able to eliminate the threat of Thread forever.

The Weyrs, led by Lessa and F'lar, embrace this possibility, and with the support of the Holds (led in particular by Jaxom) and the Crafthalls (championed by Masterharper Robinton) proceed to implement the plan under the guidance of AIVAS, which was programmed to speak with a masculine-analogue, humorous personality, which gave the impression of a light-hearted counsellor to the Pernese, who have no real concept of what artificial intelligence entails.

Over the course of the next four years, Pernese society systematically regains much technology that was lost to the colonists in early attempts to survive Threadfall, including marvels such as electricity, plastics manufacture, heating & cooling, printing presses, and surgery. Although most technological development focuses on the tools and knowledge needed to eliminate the threat of Thread, there are huge developments in the areas of medicine and science, and along the way new Crafthalls are created, including the Print Hall, Paper Hall, Computer Hall, and Dolphin Hall (this last occurs in a parallel story later in the series The Dolphins of Pern).

The phenomenal advancements in technology lead to a kind of culture shock, manifesting in certain traditionalist elements among the Pernese who label AIVAS an "Abomination" that is corrupting their society. This dissenting opinion results in attempts to sabotage AIVAS itself and the projects it initiates, culminating in the kidnapping of the beloved Masterharper Robinton in an attempt to ransom his life for the destruction of AIVAS. When the conspirators responsible for the kidnapping are brought to justice, two Lord Holders and a Craftmaster are among those sentenced to exile for the crime.

The Weyrs, Holds, and Halls are successful in carrying out AIVAS's plan to transfer the anti-matter engines from the ships used to colonize Pern to the Red Star, and detonate them. The explosion alters the Red Star's orbit, eliminating the configuration that allowed Thread to land on Pern.

AIVAS earlier reveals to Jaxom that in order for the project to succeed, he must lead the other Dragonriders into using the lesser-known Draconic capability to transfer between time to deposit two of the three engines 1800 and 600 years in the past. Only the cumulative effect of three interspersed explosions will provide sufficient force to alter the planet's orbit. Jaxom's Ruth, who has an unusually precise ability to know exactly his location in time, is the only Dragon capable of performing this feat.

In parallel to the primary task to alter the Red Star's orbit, a team of medical researchers led by Masterhealers Oldive and Sharra develop an improved parasitic vector from symbyiotic springs, named 'zebedees' by AIVAS, within the Thread ovoids. The modified springs are capable of infecting the space-born Ovoids that are the precursors to Thread. During the course of the three engine-transfer missions, Green Dragons are deployed to seed the surface of the Red Star with these infected Ovoids so that they can be dragged back to infect the Oort Cloud, which is the origin of Thread in the Pernese system. The combination of Jaxom's time travel and this infestation is responsible for the two Long Intervals in the history of Pern wherein Thread failed to appear.

The book concludes with a final conversation between AIVAS and Masterharper Robinton, with AIVAS expressing both satisfaction that its objective of eradicating future Threadfall has been achieved and concern over the possibility that Pernese society could come to idolize the facility as an all-knowing Oracle, thereby stifling further development. To prevent the latter, AIVAS deactivates its artificial intelligence functions, leaving its wealth of knowledge available to the Pernese via computer access, but without the crutch of AIVAS's direct guidance. Robinton, whose health has declined since the kidnapping, and himself satisfied that Pern has a promising future ahead, passes away in his sleep alongside his fire-lizard Zair.

== Awards ==
All the Weyrs of Pern was a finalist for the annual Hugo Award for Best Novel and it placed fifth for the annual Locus Award for Best Novel. It won the HOMer Award for science fiction novel.
