= The Masterharper of Pern =

1998 novel by Anne McCaffrey

The MasterHarper of Pern
- Brom cover of all US editions (Note: The Masterharper of Pern title listing at the Internet Speculative Fiction Database lists only Gerald Brom cover artist for US editions and only Steve Weston for UK editions.)
- Author: Anne McCaffrey
- Cover artist: Gerald Brom; Steve Weston (UK)
- Language: English
- Series: Dragonriders of Pern
- Genre: Science fiction
- Publisher: Del Rey/Ballantine
- Publication date: 12 January 1998
- Publication place: United States
- Media type: Print (hardcover & paperback)
- Pages: 431 (first US hardcover)
- ISBN: 978-0-345-38823-0
- OCLC: 37443403
- Dewey Decimal: 813/.54 21
- LC Class: PS3563.A255 M35 1998
- Preceded by: Dragonseye
- Followed by: The Skies of Pern

The Masterharper of Pern is a science fiction novel by the American-Irish author Anne McCaffrey and the fifteenth book in the Dragonriders of Pern series.

First published in 1998, the novel details the birth and early life of Robinton, who becomes the MasterHarper of Pern shortly before Lessa becomes Weyrwoman.

== Plot summary ==
Robinton was rejected by his jealous father, Petiron, and spent most of his childhood with his nurturing mother. Since Robinton grew up in a very musically inclined setting, all the inhabitants helped bring him along in his journey to adulthood. Robinton composed many successful songs at a very early age and was unanimously elected Masterharper, also at a relatively young age. He tried to warn the Lord Holders of the rapacity of Lord Fax, but was unsuccessful. He was present when Lessa used her wit to provoke the duel in which Lord Fax was killed by F'lar.
