= The White Dragon (novel) =

1978 novel by Anne McCaffrey

- First hardcover edition, Whelan cover (Note: The White Dragon, ISFDB lists cover artist Michael Whelan for all US editions before 1999; no one for the first UK edition; David Roe is listed for the UK paperback 15th edition.)
- Author: Anne McCaffrey
- Cover artist: Michael Whelan; David Roe (UK)
- Language: English
- Series: Dragonriders of Pern
- Genre: Science fiction
- Publisher: Ballantine Books
- Publication date: June 1978
- Publication place: United States
- Media type: Print (hardcover & paperback)
- Pages: 497 (first edition)
- ISBN: 978-0-345-27567-7 (first edition)
- OCLC: 3543352
- Dewey Decimal: 813/.5/4
- LC Class: PZ4.M1195 Wh; PS3563.A255
- Preceded by: Dragonsinger
- Followed by: Dragondrums

The White Dragon is a science fantasy novel by Irish writer Anne McCaffrey. It completes the original Dragonriders trilogy in the Dragonriders of Pern series, seven years after the second book. It was first published by Del Rey Books in June 1978.

In 1987, the magazine Locus ranked The White Dragon number 23 among the 33 "All-Time Best Fantasy Novels", based on a poll of subscribers.

== Origins ==
The first part of the novel was published three years earlier as A Time When, a special publication by the New England Science Fiction Association for its annual convention Boskone in 1975, where McCaffrey was Guest of Honor.

== Plot summary ==
The White Dragon follows the coming of age story of Jaxom, the young Lord of Ruatha Hold, who had accidentally impressed the unusual white dragon Ruth in Dragonquest and Dragonsong. As Jaxom grows up, he has to deal with the difficulty of being both a Lord Holder and a dragonrider, the maturity of Ruth (who, besides being white, is a runt), his own teenage angst and desire to fight Thread on his own, and the rebellious Oldtimers, who attempt to steal a golden egg from Benden Weyr. Ruth always knows when he is and can travel through time to avert the growing political crisis, but while fighting Thread, Jaxom falls ill with a potentially deadly sickness called "Fire-Head". This leads him to recuperate in Cove Hold, and while there he discovers some of the mysteries that the Ancients, the ancestors of the Pernese, left behind, and he begins to make more sense of the past.

== Awards ==
The White Dragon placed third for the annual Locus Award for Best Novel and it was one of five nominees for the annual Hugo Award for Best Novel. It won the Gandalf Award for Book-Length Fantasy and the Australian Ditmar Award for international fiction.

The American Library Association in 1999 cited the two early Pern trilogies (Dragonriders and Harper Hall), along with The Ship Who Sang, when McCaffrey received the annual Margaret A. Edwards Award for her "lifetime contribution in writing for teens".

== Historical significance ==
Fantasy and science fiction was a niche genre, but when the hardcover of The White Dragon appeared at grocery store checkouts, it become a bestseller and F&SF was no longer a niche genre. Much of the credit goes to Judy-Lynn Del Rey, who facilitated placing in the grocery stores.

== See also ==
- The Atlas of Pern (1984), a companion book produced by Karen Wynn Fonstad in consultation with McCaffrey.
