= The Skies of Pern =

2001 novel by Anne McCaffrey

- First edition (UK)
- Author: Anne McCaffrey
- Cover artist: Les Edwards
- Language: English
- Series: Dragonriders of Pern
- Genre: Science fiction
- Publisher: Bantam Books (UK); Del Rey Books (US)
- Publication date: Feb 2001 (UK); 3 April 2001 (US)
- Media type: Print (hardcover & paperback)
- Pages: 434 (first US hardcover)
- ISBN: 978-0-345-43468-5
- OCLC: 48690272
- Preceded by: The Masterharper of Pern
- Followed by: A Gift of Dragons

The Skies of Pern is a science fiction novel by the American-Irish author Anne McCaffrey and the sixteenth book in the Dragonriders of Pern series.

The Skies of Pern was first published in 2001 and was the first Pern book using the same painting to illustrate the UK and US covers.

This novel follows soon after The Dolphins of Pern, and, in contrast to the previous several Pern novels, takes place in a very short period of time within the same year.

To ensure accuracy, Anne consulted with a number of astronomers who planned and modelled the comet impact and subsequent consequences, and this group included author Bill Napier, Harry Alm and future YouTuber Scott Manley.

== Plot ==
A rogue comet that strikes Pern leads the Weyrleaders and Holders, contemplating a future where dragonriders are not needed in a Threadless world, to consider the creation of a new Star Craft made of dragonriders. The discovery by dragonriders F'lessan and Tai, later brutally attacked by large felines, of the draconic use of telekinesis, only strengthens their resolve to keep Pern's skies free of danger.

At the same time, disgruntled citizens resisting the ever-growing role of technology in Pernese life band together as Abominators, attacking Crafthalls, and are determined to destroy all the new technology in use. These fanatics are seemingly allied with Toric, the Southern Lord Holder.
