= Dragonflight (novel) =

1968 novel by Anne McCaffrey

- First edition
- Author: Anne McCaffrey
- Language: English
- Series: Dragonriders of Pern
- Genre: Science fiction
- Publisher: Ballantine Books
- Publication date: July 1968
- Publication place: United States
- Media type: Print (paperback original; 1969 hardcover)
- Pages: 309
- Awards: Hugo Award for Best Novella for "Weyr Search" (1968); Nebula Award for Best Novella for "Dragonrider" (1969)
- OCLC: 2485369
- Followed by: Dragonquest

Dragonflight is a science fiction novel by the American-Irish author Anne McCaffrey. It is the first book in the Dragonriders of Pern series. First published by Ballantine Books in July 1968, it was a fix-up of two novellas which between them had made McCaffrey the first woman writer to win a Hugo and a Nebula Award.

In 1987, Locus ranked Dragonflight at number nine among the 33 "All-Time Best Fantasy Novels", based on a poll of subscribers.

== Origins ==
Two components of Dragonflight were award-winning novellas published by Analog science fiction magazine. The first novella, "Weyr Search", illustrated by John Schoenherr, had been the cover story for the October 1967 issue. The second novella, "Dragonrider", appeared in two parts, beginning in December 1967, the first of which was also a cover story illustrated by Schoenherr.

"Weyr Search" (which became the eponymous first part of the novel) features a young woman named Lessa being recruited to establish a telepathic bond with a queen dragon at its hatching, thus becoming a dragonrider, and the leader of a Weyr community on the fictional planet Pern. In response to a request from Analog editor John W. Campbell for "more dragon stories", McCaffrey wrote the novelette "Dragonflight", the story of the growth of Lessa's queen dragon, Ramoth, and their training together. Campbell, however, "wanted to see dragons fighting Thread", Pern's menace from space, and he also suggested time travel. Starting from these suggestions, McCaffrey wrote a third story titled "Crack Dust, Black Dust", published in Analog in two parts as "Dragonrider" (the two parts became the third and fourth part of the novel, "Dust Fall" and "The Cold Between" respectively). Although "Dragonflight" was not published separately, it was, in Campbell's words a "very good bridger for the novel", and also gave the novel its name.

== Plot introduction ==
Dragonflight takes place in the far future on Pern, a planet colonized by humans. The colonists had originally intended to gradually adopt a low-technology agrarian lifestyle, but were forced to move more quickly after they encountered the deadly Thread raining down from the sky. By harnessing and riding the indigenous, flying, fire-breathing dragons (with genetic alterations to make them larger and telepathic), the colonists destroyed the Thread in the skies over Pern, creating pockets of safety over its surface, before it was able to burrow into the land and breed. Humanity finally managed to find equilibrium and began to create a thriving culture, society, and economy, eventually expanding right across Pern's northern continent. When this narrative begins, however, an unusually long interval between Thread attacks has caused the general population to dismiss the threat as myth and gradually withdraw support from the Weyrs where dragons are bred and trained. By the time of this narrative, only one Weyr remains (the other five having mysteriously disappeared at the same time in the last quiet interval), maintaining a precarious existence.

Dragons are telepathic and are capable of forming a lifelong bond with one particular human in a process called Impression. Tradition, established thousands of years before the narrative, dictates that selected young humans with empathetic and telepathic talents are taken to the Hatching Grounds as candidates for Impression. The dragons come in several colors which generally correlate with their sizes; blue males, green females, brown males, bronze males, and golden females – queens. Bronzes, the largest males, are by tradition the only ones who compete to win the queens in their mating flights. The green females are banned from breeding as they produce only small, less talented dragons. The golden queens are not only the largest dragons, they also hold a subtle control over their dragon communities Weyrs. The Queen sets out on a Mating Flight, pursued by several bronze males; the one who wins and mates with her assumes a leading position among the dragons, and his rider automatically becomes the leader of the human dragon riders. The passion of the male dragon and queen mating up in the air can telepathically transfer itself to their male and female human partners, inducing them to a passionate human lovemaking.

== Plot summary ==
Dragonflight is the story of Lessa, a girl of less than twenty turns and sole survivor of the noble ruling family of Ruatha Hold on the northern continent of Pern. When the rest of her family is killed by a cruel usurper, Fax, she survives by disguising herself as a drudge (a menial servant), partly through simply adopting a slovenly appearance, but also by using her hereditary telepathic abilities to make others see her as far older and less attractive than she actually is. Her only friend is a watch-wher, a somewhat telepathic animal related to dragons, that guards the Hold. Lessa psychically influences other Hold workers to do less than their best work, or to become clumsy or inefficient, in order to sabotage Ruatha as part of her strategy to make it economically unproductive, so that Fax will renounce it and she can retake her Hold.

F'lar, wingleader at Benden Weyr, and rider of the bronze dragon Mnementh, finds Lessa while searching for candidates to impress a new queen dragon. The current queen has a batch of eggs due to hatch shortly, including a crucial golden egg. After killing Fax in single combat, following the rules of the Pernese code duello, he realises that Lessa manipulated him emotionally to kill Fax and engineered Fax's renouncement. F'lar recognizes that Lessa possesses both unusually strong psychic abilities and great strength of will. He recognizes her potential to be the strongest Weyrwoman in recent history, and the path to his own leadership at Benden Weyr. F'lar convinces a reluctant Lessa to give up her birthright as Lord Holder of Ruatha Hold for the larger domain of the dragonweyr and she agrees to pass the title on to Fax's newborn son (who later features in The White Dragon). F'lar takes Lessa to Benden Weyr, where she Impresses the queen hatchling Ramoth and becomes the Weyrwoman, the new co-leader of the last active Weyr. On Ramoth's first mating flight, Mnementh catches her, and by Weyr tradition, this makes F'lar the Weyrleader.

One Weyr by itself is not enough to defend the planet; there had been six, but the other five Weyrs are now empty, deserted since the last Pass centuries before. In a desperate attempt to increase their numbers, a new queen, Prideth, and her rider, Kylara, are sent back between times (a recently rediscovered skill) ten turns, to allow Prideth time to mature and reproduce. Lessa travels four hundred turns into the past to bring the five 'missing' Weyrs forward to her present. This is a huge strain for both her and Ramoth. She convinces the dragonriders of the five Weyrs to go with her to their future, and they use the Red Star as a guide to make smaller, less strenuous hops forward in time. This not only provides much needed skilled reinforcements in the battle against Thread, but explains how and why the five Weyrs were abandoned: they came forward in time.

== Awards ==
Dragonflight includes the novellas "Weyr Search", which won the 1968 Hugo Award for Best Novella (voted by members of the annual World Science Fiction Convention) and "Dragonrider", which won the Nebula Award for Best Novella (voted annually by the Science Fiction and Fantasy Writers Association) in 1969. McCaffrey was the first woman writer to win either award.

In 1999, the American Library Association cited the two early Pern trilogies (Dragonriders and Harper Hall), along with The Ship Who Sang, when McCaffrey received the annual Margaret A. Edwards Award for her lifetime contribution in writing for teens.
