= Dragonsdawn =

1988 novel by Anne McCaffrey

- Whelan cover of all US editions (Note: Dragonsdawn title listing at the Internet Speculative Fiction Database lists only Michael Whelan cover artist for US editions; Steve Weston for early UK editions; and Les Edwards (UK) from May 2006.)
- Author: Anne McCaffrey
- Cover artist: Michael Whelan; Steve Weston (UK)
- Language: English
- Series: Dragonriders of Pern
- Genre: Science fiction
- Publisher: Del Rey Books
- Publication date: November 1988
- Publication place: United States
- Media type: Print (hardback & paperback)
- Pages: 431 (first US hardcover)
- ISBN: 978-0-345-33160-1
- OCLC: 20360339
- Preceded by: Nerilka's Story
- Followed by: The Renegades of Pern

Dragonsdawn is a science fiction novel by the American-Irish author Anne McCaffrey. It is ninth book in the Dragonriders of Pern series, but chronologically it takes place before any of the other books. It was published in 1988, by Del Rey in the United States and Bantam in the United Kingdom. UK editions have had various subtitles: Dragonsdawn: The First Chronicles of the Colony of Pern (Bantam, 1988) and Dragonsdawn: The Earliest Legend of Pern (Corgi, 1995).

While the Dragonriders of Pern series is recognized as science fiction (due to its origin discussing the nature of the star Rukbat and its planetary system), many of its elements in the earlier books were primarily fantasy in origin. Dragonsdawn establishes the science fiction nature of the series by defining the science behind McCaffrey's dragons.

== Plot summary ==
The planet Pern seemed a paradise to its new colonists; seeking to return to an agrarian-based simpler way of life, Admiral Paul Benden, Governor Emily Boll and the rest of the colonists had selected Pern as a place to leave their recent wars and troubles behind. Shortly after arriving on the planet, however, a new threat appeared, in the form of lethal spore named Thread.

With time running out and the colony's destruction imminent, geneticist Kitti Ping Yung and her granddaughter Wind Blossom set out to bio-engineer Pernese lifeforms that appear to instinctively react to the Thread – the dragonets that colonists have adopted as pets. In order to ensure the survival of the newly designed species, as well as reduce the possible threat they may have to the colonists by going rogue, they are created with an ability to bond with humans. By the end of the book, Sorka Hanrahan and Sean Connell and a few other young colonists become the first of the dragonriders.

== Awards ==
Dragonsdawn placed third for the annual, juried John W. Campbell Memorial Award for Best Science Fiction Novel published in the USA and seventh for the annual Locus Award for Best Novel.
