= Mercedes Lackey bibliography =

This is a list of books by Mercedes Lackey, arranged by collection.

== Valdemar universe ==
Some of the trilogies follow on chronologically from each other, while others are set a considerable number of years apart from the others—overall the books span some 2500 years.

=== The Mage Wars ===
Co-written with Larry Dixon, these are set in pre-history, some 2500 years before the Heralds of Valdemar trilogy. They describe the events which set off The Mage Storms. It involves gryphons, creatures created by the mage Urtho (Mage of Silence). The co-protagonists are Skandranon Rashkae, a princely but proud ebony gryphon, and Amberdrake, a Healer of spirit and mind called a kestra'chern.

1. The Black Gryphon (1994) ISBN 978-0886775773
2. The White Gryphon (1995) ISBN 978-0886776312
3. The Silver Gryphon (1996) ISBN 978-0886776848

=== The Founding of Valdemar ===
The story is about the Baron Kordas Valdemar fleeing with his people the oppressive Eastern Empire and founding the kingdom of Valdemar in the western wilds. The trilogy takes place c. 1000 years after The Mage Wars and some 1400 years before the original Arrows trilogy.

1. Beyond (2021) ISBN 978-0-7564-1733-8
2. Into the West (2022) ISBN 978-0-7564-1736-9
3. Valdemar (2023) ISBN 978-0756417390

=== The Last Herald-Mage ===
These occur some centuries before the Heralds of Valdemar books, telling the life story of Vanyel Ashkevron; by the time of the "later" books he has become legend, thus explaining some of the small inconsistencies. This series was also consistently nominated for the Lambda Literary Prize, with Magic's Price winning in 1990. As of 2021, the novels in The Last Herald-Mage trilogy are in development as the first season of a television show based on the Valdemar universe adapted by Kit Williamson and Brittany Cavallaro with Ted Field, Anthony Tringali, Michael Napoliello, and Maria Frisk at Radar Pictures executive-producing. It is intended to be the first live action adaptation of Lackey's work.

1. Magic's Pawn (1989) ISBN 978-0-14-016751-1
2. Magic's Promise (1990) ISBN 978-0-88677-401-1
3. Magic's Price (1991) ISBN 978-0-88677-426-4

=== Collegium Chronicles ===
This series marked Lackey's novel-length return to Valdemar after a five-year hiatus. The series takes place about a half a century after Magic's Price and about 500 years before the Heralds of Valdemar books and tells about the time of the founding of the Heralds' Collegium.

1. Foundation (2008) ISBN 978-0-7564-0576-2
2. Intrigues (2010) ISBN 978-0-7564-0639-4
3. Changes (2011) ISBN 978-0-7564-0692-9
4. Redoubt (2012) ISBN 978-0-7564-0745-2
5. Bastion (2013) ISBN 978-0-7564-0944-9

=== The Herald Spy ===
This series is a continuation of the story of Mags from the Collegium Chronicles. It covers Mags' journey as a full herald and a spy.

1. Closer to Home (2014) ISBN 978-0-7564-0899-2
2. Closer to the Heart (2015) ISBN 978-0-7564-0900-5
3. Closer to the Chest (2016) ISBN 978-0-7564-0901-2

=== Valdemar: Family Spies ===
This series is a continuation of the story of Mags after The Herald Spy trilogy. It follows Mags and his children as they learn the family business.

1. The Hills Have Spies (2018) ISBN 978-0-7564-1317-0
2. Eye Spy (July 2019) ISBN 978-0-7564-1320-0
3. Spy, Spy Again (June 2020) ISBN 978-0756413231

=== Brightly Burning ===
Brightly Burning (May 2000, ISBN 978-0-613-63021-4) is a stand-alone novel, set somewhere between Collegium Chronicles and the Heralds of Valdemar books; it describes another legendary character briefly referred to in the latter, Lavan Firestorm.

=== Vows and Honor ===
These precede the Heralds of Valdemar books and center around the characters Tarma and Kethry. These characters appeared first in Marion Zimmer Bradley's Sword and Sorceress series and were revisited in subsequent short stories. Two of these short stories are woven into the Vows and Honor books as part of a longer narrative. The original Vows and Honor pair of books were linked together with By the Sword (published long before Oathblood) as a trilogy.

1. The Oathbound (1988)
2. Oathbreakers (1989)
3. Oathblood (1998)

The third volume, Oathblood, is made up entirely of short stories in place of a longer narrative. With its publication, nearly all of the Tarma and Kethry stories were available together in a single compiled volume for the first time. The single missing story, "A Dragon in Distress", was co-authored with Elisabeth Waters and was originally published in the Sword and Sorceress series, volume XII. The story, now available as a solo e-book, is missing from the Oathblood collection due to being set in Elisabeth Waters's world, not Mercedes Lackey's Valdemar.

The contents of Oathblood are as follows:

1. "Introduction" (1998) — originally published in Oathblood
2. "Sword-sworn" (1985) — originally published in Sword and Sorceress III
3. "Turnabout" (1986) — originally published in Oathbound
4. "The Making of a Legend" (1990) – originally published in Sword and Sorceress VI
5. "Keys" (1988) — originally published in Sword and Sorceress V
6. "A Woman's Weapon" (1992) — originally published in Sword and Sorceress IX
7. "The Talisman" (1990) — originally published in Sword and Sorceress VII
8. "A Tale of Heroes" (1987) — originally published in Sword and Sorceress IV
9. "Friendly Fire" (1993) — originally published in Sword and Sorceress X
10. "Wings of Fire" (1991) — originally published in Sword and Sorceress VIII
11. "Spring Plowing at Forst Reach" (1998) — originally published in Oathblood
12. "Oathblood" (1998) — originally published in Oathblood

In the books and short stories, Tarma is a sword-wielding Shin'a'in clanswoman. Kethry is a magic-user who carries a sword with unusual properties. The nature of this sword, Need, is explored in later series set in Valdemar. At the time of the Vows and Honor books, all that is known is that it is magic, protects female bearers, and can pressure its owner into assisting other women. The overarching goal for the two women is to accumulate resources enough to regenerate Tarma's almost-destroyed clan. As the titles of the books suggest, emphasis is laid on the importance and consequences of oaths in at least one story from each book. The setting of the books is generally in the lands south of Valdemar such as Rethwellan, although there is a brief sojourn in Valdemar in Oathbreakers. Despite limited time in Valdemar, there were references in the first two Vows and Honor books to the Companions of Valdemar which laid early hints to their nature. The introduction of a fourfold deity (Tarma's Goddess) was something of a novel idea at the time of publication.

=== Kerowyn's Tale ===
This is a stand-alone novel which connects the Vows & Honor sub-series to the Heralds and other trilogies; it introduces the character Kerowyn, who is the granddaughter of Kethry from the Vows and Honor sub-series.

- By the Sword (1991)

=== Heralds of Valdemar ===
This set consists of the original trilogy, the very first Valdemar books published, and a prequel trilogy.

==== Heralds of Valdemar prequels ====
These center on the Weaponsmaster Alberich (in the first two books) and the thief Skif (in the third book), telling the stories of their not-entirely-voluntary enrollments as Heralds. The order in which they were written differs from the internal chronology.

1. Exile's Honor (2002)
2. Exile's Valor (2003)
3. Take a Thief (2001)

==== Arrows trilogy ====
The first written and published of the Valdemar novels, these center on the character Talia, who from the moment of being Chosen by her Companion Rolan becomes the special and hard-working Queen's Own Herald.

1. Arrows of the Queen (1987)
2. Arrow's Flight (1987)
3. Arrow's Fall (1988)

=== The Mage Winds ===
These follow on from the original Heralds of Valdemar trilogy and center on Princess Elspeth completing her transformation from "the Brat" to a fully-fledged Herald. Secondary protagonists include Skif and a new character, Darkwind.

The latter part of Kerowyn's Tale, By the Sword, fills in the events that happen after Arrow's Fall but before Winds of Fate.

1. Winds of Fate (1991) ISBN 978-0-88677-516-2
2. Winds of Change (1992) ISBN 978-0-88677-563-6
3. Winds of Fury (1993) ISBN 978-0-88677-612-1

=== The Mage Storms ===
This next trilogy follows on the Heralds of Valdemar story and centers around the characters Karal and An'desha as Velgarth is threatened by a repetition of the Cataclysm described in The Mage Wars trilogy. This trilogy also focuses on the threat posed to Valdemar by the vast Eastern Empire and the development of the newly formed Alliance between Valdemar and its surrounding nations.

1. Storm Warning (1994)
2. Storm Rising (1995)
3. Storm Breaking (1996)

=== Darian's Tale ===
The Owl trilogy takes place several years after the events of The Mage Storms and follows the character Darian. The story focuses on the repercussions of the mage storms on Valdemar's northern border and centers on new tensions between the Kingdom and invading barbarians from beyond the Ice Wall.

1. Owlflight (1997) ISBN 978-0-613-18137-2
2. Owlsight (1998) ISBN 978-0-88677-803-3
3. Owlknight (1999) ISBN 978-0-88677-916-0

=== Kelvren's Saga ===
The setting of this miniseries of shorter fiction and a novel is a post–Mage Storms military conflict with a "secessionist" movement in Deedun. The series features the character Kelvren Skothkar from the preceding series Darian's Tale.

1. "A Perfect Day in Valdemar" (2002), novelette by Larry Dixon, first appeared in the anthology Fantasy: DAW 30th Anniversary
2. "Transmutation" (2005), short story by Larry Dixon, first appeared in Crossroads and Other Tales of Valdemar, Valdemar Anthology, Volume 3
3. "Ripples and Cracks" (2016), short story with Larry Dixon, first appeared in Tempest, Valdemar Anthology, Volume 10
4. Gryphon in Light (2023) ISBN 978-0756414481, with Larry Dixon

=== Anthologies and other publications ===
Various anthologies have been published from 1997 featuring some short stories by Lackey and other authors she invited to write about the Valdemar universe. A companion book was also produced about the universe.

- Sword of Ice and Other Tales of Valdemar (1997)
- The Valdemar Companion (2001), edited by John Helfers and Denise Little
- "On the Other Side" (2003; short story) (collected in Janis Ian's and Mike Resnick's anthology Stars: Original Stories Based on the Songs of Janis Ian)
- Sun in Glory and Other Tales of Valdemar (2003)
- Crossroads and Other Tales of Valdemar (2005)
- Moving Targets and Other Tales of Valdemar (2008)
- Changing the World: All-New Tales of Valdemar (2009)
- Finding the Way and Other Tales of Valdemar (2010)
- Under the Vale and Other Tales of Valdemar (2011)
- No True Way: All-New Tales of Valdemar (2014)
- Crucible: All-New Tales of Valdemar (2015)
- Tempest: All-New Tales of Valdemar (2016, ISBN 978-0756409036)
- Pathways: All-New Tales of Valdemar (2017, ISBN 978-0756409043)
- Choices: All-New Tales of Valdemar (2018, ISBN 978-0756414689)
- Seasons (November 2019, ISBN 978-0756414702)
- Passages (November, 2020, ISBN 978-0756414726)
- Boundaries (December, 2021, ISBN 978-0756414740)
- Shenanigans (December 2022, ISBN 978-0756418502)
- Anything with Nothing (November 2023, ISBN 978-0756418731)
- Feuds (November 2024, ISBN 978-0756419530)

== Elves on the Road universe ==
This universe is set in warp-modern time featuring elves and magic.

=== Bedlam's Bard ===
Lackey wrote the first few in this series with Ellen Guon and the latter part with Rosemary Edghill.

- Bedlam Boyz (1993) by Ellen Guon as a prequel to Knight of Ghosts and Shadows
- Knight of Ghosts and Shadows (1990) with Ellen Guon
- Summoned to Tourney (1992) with Ellen Guon
- Bedlam's Bard (1998) — compilation of Knight of Ghosts and Shadows and Summoned to Tourney
- Beyond World's End (2001) with Rosemary Edghill
- Spirits White as Lightning (2001) with Rosemary Edghill
- A Host of Furious Fancies — compilation of Beyond World's End and Spirits White as Lightning
- Mad Maudlin (2003) with Rosemary Edghill
- Music to My Sorrow (2005) with Rosemary Edghill
- Bedlam's Edge (2005) with Rosemary Edghill — a collection of short stories, set in the same universe as the rest of the series but not involving any of the characters from the rest of the books. It includes two stories and an essay by Mercedes Lackey, one story each from Ellen Guon and Rosemary Edghill, and nine from a variety of other authors.
- The Waters and the Wild (2019) with Rosemary Edghill

When reading the series in chronological order, Music to My Sorrow follows directly from Mad Maudlin.

=== Diana Tregarde ===
The main character, Diana Tregarde, is an American witch, practicing a fantasy version of Wicca; by virtue of her position as a "Guardian" Diana has access to more magical power than many and she is required to give her help when someone asks it of her. Her magical abilities do not pay the bills, however, and so Diana makes her living by writing romance novels. In the stories, Diana must protect others from angry deities, vampires and a sorceress who intends to remain eternally young.

1. Burning Water (1989)
2. Children of the Night (1990)
3. Jinx High (1991)
- Diana Tregarde Investigates (2006; omnibus edition of the above three novels)
- Arcanum 101 (2010) is a novella included in Trio of Sorcery (2010)

The character Diana Tregarde first appeared in two short stories, "Satanic, Versus..." and "Nightside", which were originally written for inclusion in the Bureau 13: Stalking the Night Fantastic roleplaying game. The short stories were first published in Marion Zimmer Bradley's Fantasy Magazine:

- "Satanic, Versus ..." (1990) Marion Zimmer Bradley's Fantasy Magazine, Autumn 1990
- "Nightside" (1989) Marion Zimmer Bradley's Fantasy Magazine, Autumn 1989
- "Killer Byte" (1994) Marion Zimmer Bradley's Fantasy Magazine, Spring 1994

The books were published under Tor's horror imprint rather than its fantasy one. At the time of publication, positive depictions of what Wiccans and, more generally, neopagans believed and did were rare. In the mid-nineties, Lackey's books generally were regularly cited as examples of pagan-friendly fiction. Lackey wrote that she had no plans for further books in the series because they did not sell well; nonetheless, she incorporated several elements of the Guardian mythos, including the apartment building where Diana lived, into later books in her Bedlam's Bard series.

In the collection Bedlam's Edge Lackey notes that she placed the Diana Tregarde world with her SERRAted Edge and Summoned to Tourney world with the intention of forcing anyone who believed Diana Tregarde and the Guardians were real to also have to believe in elves, dragons, and other patently fantastical things.

=== The SERRAted Edge ===
- Born to Run (1992) with Larry Dixon ISBN 978-0-671-72110-7
- Wheels of Fire (1992) with Mark Shepherd ISBN 978-0-671-72138-1
- When the Bough Breaks (1993) with Holly Lisle ISBN 978-0-671-72154-1
- Chrome Circle (1994) with Larry Dixon ISBN 978-0-671-87615-9
- Elvendude (1994) by Mark Shepherd ISBN 978-0-671-87630-2
- Spiritride (1997) by Mark Shepherd ISBN 978-0-671-87775-0
- Lazerwarz (1999) by Mark Shepherd ISBN 978-0-671-57806-0
- Stoned Souls with Josepha Sherman (never published, as of February 2020)
- Silence (2017) with Cody Martin ISBN 978-1-481-48240-0
- Breaking Silence (2020) with Cody Martin
- The Otherworld (1999) with Holly Lisle and Mark Shepherd (omnibus edition, contains Wheels of Fire and When the Bough Breaks) ISBN 978-0-671-57852-7
- The Chromeborne (1999) with Larry Dixon (omnibus edition, contains Born to Run and Chrome Circle) ISBN 978-0-671-57834-3

==== The SERRAted Edge: Doubled Edge ====
The Doubled Edge series is set several hundred years earlier than the other SERRAted Edge books. The storyline is historically based, surrounding Elizabeth I's parentage, birth, and rise to power. In the fictional series, the Light court elves try to bring Elizabeth safely to the throne, while the Dark court elves hope for the misery of religious persecution from her half-sister Mary. This Scepter'd Isle revolves around Henry VIII's illegitimate son Henry FitzRoy, 1st Duke of Richmond and Somerset, and the later three focus on Elizabeth.

- This Scepter'd Isle (2004) with Roberta Gellis ISBN 978-0-7434-9889-0
- Ill Met by Moonlight (2005) with Roberta Gellis ISBN 978-1-4165-2096-2
- By Slanderous Tongues (2007) with Roberta Gellis ISBN 978-1-4165-2107-5
- And Less than Kind (2008) with Roberta Gellis ISBN 978-1-4391-3284-5

== Sacred Ground ==
Sacred Ground (1995) is a non-series contemporary novel about Native American magic. The main character, Jennifer Talldeer, is a private investigator. She is also Kestral-Hunts-Alone, an apprentice shaman learning modified tribal magic from her grandfather. She is called in to investigate possible sabotage at a local construction site where Indian artifacts have been found.

In her short story After Midnight Lackey implies that the novel was an attempt to recover the spirit of the Diana Tregarde novels after the fiasco with a few fans believing the novels were based on real events. Sacred Ground, however, also did not sell well, and Lackey took a break from dark fantasy.

"Drums" (2010) is a novella included in Trio of Sorcery (2010)

== Heirs of Alexandria series ==
Written with Dave Freer and Eric Flint, Heirs of Alexandria is set in an alternate "Venetian Empire" in which magic thrives. A significant amount of text, and a couple of major characters in this work are adapted from stories written by Lackey in the Merovingen Nights shared universe series. That series was started by C. J. Cherryh in her novel Angel with the Sword.

1. The Shadow of the Lion, March 2002, Baen Books, ISBN 978-0743435239
2. A Mankind Witch, July 2005, Baen Books, ISBN 978-0886776312
3. This Rough Magic, December 2003, Baen Books, ISBN 978-0743499095
4. Much Fall of Blood, 2010, Baen Books, ISBN 978-1-4391-3351-4
5. Burdens of the Dead, 2013, Baen Books, ISBN 978-1-4516-3874-5

The first books in this series were featured on various Baen CDs. In 2010 Baen CD 23 featuring 1635: The Eastern Front included The Shadow of the Lion, A Mankind Witch, This Rough Magic, and Much Fall of Blood of the Heirs of Alexandria among other books.

== The Secret World Chronicle ==
1. Invasion (2006) with Steve Libbey, Dennis Lee and Cody Martin
2. The Hunt (2007) with Steve Libbey, Dennis Lee and Cody Martin [ISFDB & Mercedes Lackey both say the 2nd book is 'World Divided']
3. World Well Lost [a.k.a. Revolution] (2009) with Dennis Lee and Cody Martin
4. Collision (2015) with Dennis Lee and Cody Martin
5. Avalanche (2018) with Dennis Lee, Cody Martin, and Veronica Giguere

The Secret World Chronicle is a series of "braided novels", based on characters and ideas created by Lackey and Libbey in an on-line role-playing environment, transposed into an entirely new setting. Although there are plans to set future works in different eras, Invasion is set in the present-day in a world where "metas" (short for metahumans, that setting's term for superheroes) first appeared during World War II and now play an important role in keeping the world safe. In Invasion, the world is invaded by a mysterious force of armored Nazi soldiers, from the disbanded arcane Thule Society, some of whom are subsequently found not to be human.

While the Secret World Chronicle is not set in the same world as the SERRAted Edge and Bedlam's Bard series, it does share certain elements in common with those books: one of Invasion's central characters, Victoria Victrix Nagy, is referred to as a Knight of Underhill.

The first book of the Secret World Chronicle began serialization in podcast form in September 2006, read aloud by actors Adam Higgins and Laura Patterson. Beginning in 2007, the series continued to be read by voiceover artist Veronica Giguere. In the second quarter of 2009, the series was sold to Baen Books with a publication date of 2011 for the first book and 2012 for the second.

According to Lackey's website, the four published books are Invasion (2011), World Divided (2012), Revolution (2013), and Collision (2015), with two short stories – Secret World War: White Bird and Secret World War: Sgian Dubh – also available. A fifth book, Avalanche, was released in August 2018.

== The Halfblood Chronicles with Andre Norton ==
This series of novels is set on a world where both elves and dragons arrived from dimensional portals onto a world where humans were native. The dragons remained hidden and elves subjugated the humans. The story follows the exploits of a group of half-blooded humans attempting to fight the elves.

1. The Elvenbane (1991)
2. Elvenblood (1995)
3. Elvenborn (2002)
4. Elvenbred (planned before the death of Andre Norton in 2005, this book has finally been co-written with Ben Ohlander and will be released in March, 2027)

== Elemental Masters ==
Set in an earth where magic exists during the early 20th century, these stories follow magicians who control the powers of Air, Fire, Water, and Earth. These stories are based loosely—sometimes very loosely—on various fairy tales. Although these books all take place in the same "world" and all include the same established system of Elemental Magick, the first book, The Fire Rose, can be distinguished in that the story takes place in the United States rather than in England, and the set of characters are not interrelated as are those in the following books. The Wizard of London can be considered a prequel to the other stories set in England and takes place during the Victorian Era.

1. The Fire Rose (1995, ISBN 0-671-87750-X), based on Beauty and the Beast
2. The Serpent's Shadow (2001, ISBN 0-7564-0061-9), based on Snow White
3. The Gates of Sleep (2002, ISBN 0-7564-0101-1), based on Sleeping Beauty
4. Phoenix and Ashes (2004, ISBN 0-7564-0272-7), based on Cinderella
5. The Wizard of London (October 2005, ISBN 0-7564-0174-7), based on The Snow Queen
6. Reserved for the Cat (October 2007, ISBN 978-0-7564-0362-1), based on Puss in Boots
7. Unnatural Issue (June 2011, ISBN 978-0756405755), based on Donkeyskin
8. Home from the Sea (June 2012, ISBN 978-0756407278), based on East of the Sun and West of the Moon, Tam Lin, and The Great Silkie of Sule Skerry
9. Steadfast (June 2013, ISBN 978-0756408015), based on The Steadfast Tin Soldier
10. Blood Red (June 2014, ISBN 978-0756408978), based on Little Red Riding Hood
11. From a High Tower (June 2015, ISBN 978-0756408985), based on Rapunzel
12. A Study in Sable (June 2016, ISBN 978-0756408725), featuring Sherlock Holmes and based on The Twa Sisters
13. A Scandal in Battersea (October 2017, ISBN 978-0756408732), featuring Sherlock Holmes
14. The Bartered Brides (October 2018, ISBN 978-0756408749), featuring Sherlock Holmes and related to Bluebeard
15. The Case of the Spellbound Child (December 2019, ISBN 978-0756412111), featuring Sherlock Holmes and based on Hansel and Gretel
16. Jolene (December 2020, ISBN 978-0756412142), based on The Queen of the Copper Mountain
17. The Silver Bullets of Annie Oakley (January 2022, ISBN 978-0756412173), loosely based on the story of Annie Oakley
18. Miss Amelia's List (December 2024, ISBN 978-0756419097)

Like her Valdemar universe, two anthologies have been published featuring stories by Lackey and other invited authors:

- Elemental Magic (2012)
- Elementary (2013)

== Fairy Tale ==
1. Firebird (1996), based on Russian folk tales
2. The Black Swan (1999), based on the ballet Swan Lake
3. Briarheart (October 2021, ISBN 978-0759557451), based on Sleeping Beauty

== Tales of the Five Hundred Kingdoms ==
A fantasy series that deals with the more mature side of fairy tales. In the Five Hundred Kingdoms, the destinies of witches, knights, princesses and such are regulated by The Tradition, a magical force that is one of the primary sources of magic. Fairy Godmothers, Champions, and Wizards are responsible for ensuring that The Tradition is upheld with a minimal loss of life. As with The Black Swan, place-names suggest that these books are set in a fantasized version of late-medieval Europe. The Five Hundred Kingdoms series is published as part of Harlequin's Luna imprint, targeted at female romance-science fiction/fantasy readers.

1. The Fairy Godmother (2004)
2. One Good Knight (2006)
3. Fortune's Fool (2007)
4. The Snow Queen (2008)
5. The Sleeping Beauty (2010)
6. Beauty and the Werewolf (2011)

In addition to the novels, two novellas, "Moontide", first published in the anthology Winter Moon (2005), and "A Tangled Web", first published in the anthology Harvest Moon (2010), are also set in the Five Hundred Kingdoms.

== Free Bards universe ==
=== Bardic Voices ===
1. The Lark and the Wren (1992)
2. The Robin & the Kestrel (1994)
3. The Eagle & the Nightingales (1996)
4. Four and Twenty Blackbirds (1997, ISBN 0-671-87853-0)

The Free Bards had their genesis in the story "Fiddler Fair", originally written for an Andre Norton shared-world anthology titled Magic in Ithkar, and published in the third volume. Lackey rewrote, changed, and expanded the story into a setting of its own in The Lark and the Wren. "Fiddler Fair" may be found in the Mercedes Lackey short-story collection that is also titled Fiddler Fair.

=== Bardic Choices ===
1. A Cast of Corbies (1994)

== The Dragon Jousters ==
The books primarily follow the story of Vetch (or Kiron, from the second book onward), and centers initially around a war between the neighboring countries of Alta and Tia, both of which use Dragon Jousters as their most powerful weapons. The settings in the books resemble the pre-Dynastic period of Ancient Egypt, with dragons; others have suggested (very loosely) the myth of Atlantis. There is also an arcade video game by the same name, which involved lance-wielding combatants on flying creatures, but is unrelated. This series began with a short story entitled "Joust" which was published in The Dragon Quintet (ISBN 076531035X). This short story was later expanded into the following series with the first novel holding the same name as the short story that began the series.

1. Joust (2003)
2. Alta (2004)
3. Sanctuary (May 2005)
4. Aerie (October 2006)

== Obsidian universe with James Mallory ==
The world of the Obsidian Mountain, Enduring Flame, and Dragon Prophecy series contains many mythological creatures, and contains several types of magic, each with its own dynamics, strengths, and weakness. The High Magic and Wild Magic are used by the protagonists, while the Dark Magic is an old magic primarily practiced by a race of demons called the Endarkened.

There are several types of mages featured:

- Wildmage: A mage who was given the "Three books of Wild Magic". They can do a wide variety of things, but each spell has two prices that depend on the size of the magick: a physical price, that usually gets the Wildmage tired but it can get him killed, and the MagePrice, that requires the people involved to do a deed as dictated by the gods of wild magic. Both prices can be shared by other people if they want.
- Knight-Mage: A type of wild-mage which only appears during the direst of times. Most of their magic is in the ability to excel in the various forms of warfare, but what comes naturally to a regular Wild Mage often comes with difficulty to a Knight-Mage, as a result of their martial focus.
- High Mage: A mage who practices "High magic", also known as war magic. They must be trained to use their magic, otherwise the magic will kill them. High Magery involves decades of training of the Magegift to gain mastery, and differs from the Wild Magic in that it is heavily ritualized and requires vast amounts of supporting equipment for all but generally the simplest of spells (unless one has mastered High Magic).
- Elvenmage: Little information is told about them, but they are similar to Wildmages.
- Dark Mage: A Wildmage or Elvenmage that has been tainted or shadow-touched. Many believed that they were in the right, while others were just greedy. Dark Mages serve the Endarkened.
- The Endarkened: A race of demons who use a powerful magic which derives power from the suffering and death of others. They were originally Elves who were tainted by "He-Who-Is", the main antagonists in the Obsidian Trilogy. The Endarkened had immortality.

All kinds of mages, except the Endarkened, can bond themselves to dragons, creating a mind-link with them and having access to their almost unlimited source of power. Usually both dragon and bonded have to accept the bond, but the Dark Mages use spells to force the bond, so, the dragons used to run away from them.

=== The Obsidian Mountain Trilogy ===
This series primarily follows the adventures of Kellen Tavadon during the third war between the races of light and the Endarkened.

1. The Outstretched Shadow (2003)
2. To Light a Candle (2004)
3. When Darkness Falls (2006)

=== The Enduring Flame Trilogy ===
Set 1000 years after the events in the Obsidian Mountain trilogy and following an entirely new cast of characters, with the exception of cameo appearances by major characters Jermayan and Idalia, and the continued presence of Ancaladar the Dragon.

1. The Phoenix Unchained (2007)
2. The Phoenix Endangered (2008)
3. The Phoenix Transformed (2009)

=== The Dragon Prophecy Trilogy ===
1. Crown of Vengeance with James Mallory (2012)
2. Blade of Empire with James Mallory (October 2017)
3. Deliverance of Dragons with James Mallory (May 2025)

== One Dozen Daughters ==
Written with James Mallory.

1. The House of the Four Winds (2014)

== The Bard's Tale ==
Based on The Bard's Tale computer role playing game series:

1. Castle of Deception (1992) with Josepha Sherman
2. Fortress of Frost and Fire (1993) with Ru Emerson
3. Prison of Souls (1993) with Mark Shepherd

== Hunter Series ==
1. Hunter (2015) ISBN 9781484707845
2. Elite (2016) ISBN 9781484707852
3. Apex (2017) ISBN 9781484707869

== Shadow Grail ==
Written with Rosemary Edghill, Shadow Grail is a young adult fantasy series about Spirit White, a teenager who has lost her family in an accident and is sent to Oakhurst Academy, where all the students have magical powers.

1. Legacies, Tor Teen, 2010
2. Conspiracies, Tor Teen, 2011
3. Sacrifices, Tor Teen, 2013
4. Victories, Tor Teen, 2014

== Reboots ==
In a future world where zombies, vampires and werewolves co-exist with 'normal' humans on Earth, space ships are staffed by a motley crew of various types of undead or near-dead creatures. The novels were written with Cody Martin.

1. Reboots, Phoenix Pick (2013, ISBN 978-1612420493), features a prequel novelette by Cody Martin.
2. Reboots: Diabolical Streak, Phoenix Pick (2014, ISBN 978-1612421384), written with Cody Martin
3. Reboots: Undead Can Dance, CAEZIK SF & Fantasy (2021, ISBN 978-1647100223), written with Cody Martin

== Collections of short stories ==
- Fiddler Fair (March 1, 1998), ISBN 0-671-87866-2
  - "How I Spent My Summer Vacation" (introduction)
  - "Aliens Ate My Pickup"
  - "Small Print"
  - "Last Rights"
  - "Dumb Feast"
  - "Dance Track"
  - "Jihad"
  - "Balance"
  - "Dragon's Teeth"
  - "The Cup and the Cauldron"
  - "Once and Future"
  - "Fiddler Fair"
  - "The Enemy of My Enemy"
- Werehunter (April 1, 1999), ISBN 0-671-57805-7
  - "Werehunter"
  - "Skitty"
  - "A Tail of Two Skitties"
  - "SCat"
  - "A Better Mousetrap"
  - "Last of the Season"
  - "Satanic, Versus"
  - "Nightside"
  - "Wet Wings"
  - "Stolen Silver"
  - "Roadkill"
  - "Operation Desert Fox"
  - "Grey"
  - "Grey's Ghost"

In 2013, Fiddler Fair and Werehunter were republished as the omnibus Dragon's Teeth, ISBN 978-1-4516-3943-8.

== Anthology series ==
=== Sword and Sorceress series short stories ===
Nine Lackey stories written for the Sword and Sorceress anthology involve Tarma and Kethry as the main characters. With the exception of "A Dragon in Distress", all of these short stories have subsequently been published in a compiled Tarma and Kethry novel called Oathblood (April 1998, ISBN 0-88677-773-9). The reason this story was left out of the compiled novel is due to the fact that the setting for "A Dragon in Distress" takes place in Elisabeth Waters's world, not Lackey's Velgarth.

1. Sword and Sorceress III (July 1986, ISBN 0-88677-141-2), story "Sword Sworn"
2. Sword and Sorceress IV (July 1987, ISBN 0-88677-210-9), story "A Tale of Heroes"
3. Sword and Sorceress V (August 1988, ISBN 0-88677-288-5), story "Keys"
4. Sword and Sorceress VI (June 1990, ISBN 0-88677-423-3), story "The Making of a Legend"
5. Sword and Sorceress VII (December 1990, ISBN 0-88677-457-8), story "The Talisman"
6. Sword and Sorceress VIII (September 1991, ISBN 0-88677-486-1), story "Wings of Fire"
7. Sword and Sorceress IX (April 1992, ISBN 0-88677-509-4), story "A Woman's Weapon"
8. Sword and Sorceress X (June 1993, ISBN 0-88677-552-3), story "Friendly Fire"
9. Sword and Sorceress XII (July 1995, ISBN 0-88677-657-0), story "A Dragon in Distress" with Elisabeth Waters
10. Sword and Sorceress XXIII (November 2008, ISBN 1-934648-78-7), story "Scam Artistry" with Elisabeth Waters

=== Merovingen Nights series short fiction ===
- Some of these stories were recycled in "Heirs of Alexandria":
  - "Deathangel" (1987) (novelette), in the anthology Merovingen Nights: Festival Moon, edited by C. J. Cherryh
  - "A Plague On Your Houses" (1987) (novelette), in the anthology Merovingen Nights: Fever Season, edited by C. J. Cherryh
  - "A Tangled Web We Weave" (1988) (novelette), in the anthology Merovingen Nights: Troubled Waters, edited by C. J. Cherryh
  - "More Than Meets the Eye" (1988) (novelette), in the anthology Merovingen Nights: Smugglers Gold, edited by C. J. Cherryh
  - "Merovingian Folklore 101, or, Alarums, Excursions, and Rumors" (1988) (essay), in the anthology Merovingen Nights: Smugglers Gold, edited by C. J. Cherryh
  - "Turning Point" (1989) (novelette), in the anthology Merovingen Nights: Divine Right, edited by C. J. Cherryh
  - "Turning Point (Reprised) (#1)" (1989) (novelette), in the anthology Merovingen Nights: Divine Right, edited by C. J. Cherryh
  - "Don't Look Back" (1990) (novelette), in the anthology Merovingen Nights: Flood Tide, edited by C. J. Cherryh
  - "With Friends Like These" (1990) (novelette), in the anthology Merovingen Nights: Flood Tide, edited by C. J. Cherryh
  - "Proving Ground" (1991) (novelette), in the anthology Merovingen Nights: Endgame, edited by C. J. Cherryh

=== Darkover series short stories ===
  - "A Different Kind of Courage" (1985) in the anthology Free Amazons of Darkover edited by Marion Zimmer Bradley
  - "An Object Lesson" (1990) in the anthology Domains of Darkover edited by Marion Zimmer Bradley
  - "Set a Thief" (1991) in the anthology Renunciates of Darkover edited by Marion Zimmer Bradley
  - "Poetic License" (1994) in the anthology Snows of Darkover edited by Marion Zimmer Bradley

=== Elfquest series short stories ===
  - "A Friend In Need" (1989) (short story), in the anthology Elfquest - The Blood of Ten Chiefs, Vol. 3: Winds of Change edited by Richard Pini
  - "The Phantom of the Berry Patch" (1989) (short story) with Richard Pini, in the anthology Elfquest - The Blood of Ten Chiefs, Vol. 3: Winds of Change edited by Richard Pini
  - "Ties That Bind" (1990) (short story), in the anthology Elfquest - The Blood of Ten Chiefs, Vol. 4: Against Wind edited by Richard Pini
  - "Riders of the Storm" (1993) (short story), in the anthology Elfquest - The Blood of Ten Chiefs, Vol. 5: Dark Hours edited by Richard Pini

=== 1632 series short stories ===
  - "To Dye For" (2004) (short story, in the anthology Ring of Fire, edited by Eric Flint
  - "Dye Another Day" (2011) (short story, in the anthology Ring of Fire III, edited by Eric Flint

== Other works ==
- Reap the Whirlwind (1989) with C. J. Cherryh (book three of The Sword of Knowledge trilogy)
- The Ship Who Searched (1992) with Anne McCaffrey, Book 3 in The Brainship Series, ISBN 0-671-72129-1
- Freedom Flight (1992) with Ellen Guon, Book 1 in the Wing Commander universe, ISBN 0-671-72145-3
- Rediscovery (1993) (with Marion Zimmer Bradley), Book 20 in the Darkover series, ISBN 0-88677-529-9
- If I Pay Thee Not in Gold (1993) with Piers Anthony, ISBN 0-671-87623-6
- Tiger Burning Bright (1995) with Marion Zimmer Bradley and Andre Norton, ISBN 0-688-14360-1
- In Celebration of Lammas Night (1996), created by Mercedes Lackey, anthology edited by Josepha Sherman; poem "Lammas Night" and short story "Hallowmas Night"
- Flights of Fantasy (1999) editor, an anthology of raptor stories, includes story Wide Wings
- The River's Gift (1999) ISBN 0-451-45759-5
- Charmed Destinies (with Rachel Lee and Catherine Asaro); short story "Counting Crows" (Luna 2003)
- The Wizard of Karres (2004) with Eric Flint and Dave Freer, ISBN 978-0-7434-8839-6
- Winter Moon (with Tanith Lee and C.E. Murphy); novella Moontide (Luna 2005)
- Gwenhwyfar: The White Spirit (2009) ISBN 978-0756406295
- Harvest Moon (with Cameron Haley and Michelle Sagara); novella A Tangled Web (Luna 2010)
- Dead Reckoning (2012) with Rosemary Edghill ISBN 978-1599906843
- Nebula Awards Showcase 2016 (2016) (edited)

=== David Arkenstone collaboration ===
- "Quest of the Dream Warrior" (1995), short story with composer and musician David Arkenstone; Arkenstone's album of the same name is based on the story that appears in the booklet that comes with the album
- "Return of the Guardians" (1996), short story with David Arkenstone; Arkenstone's album of the same name is based on the story that appears in the booklet that comes with the album

=== Other ===
- Lackey contributed a story arc to City of Heroes in 2010 using that game's Architect system. This arc features "Diane Tregarde" (not "Diana") as a contact for a comic story about supernatural villain temp agencies.
