= Mark Shepherd (novelist) =

American novelist

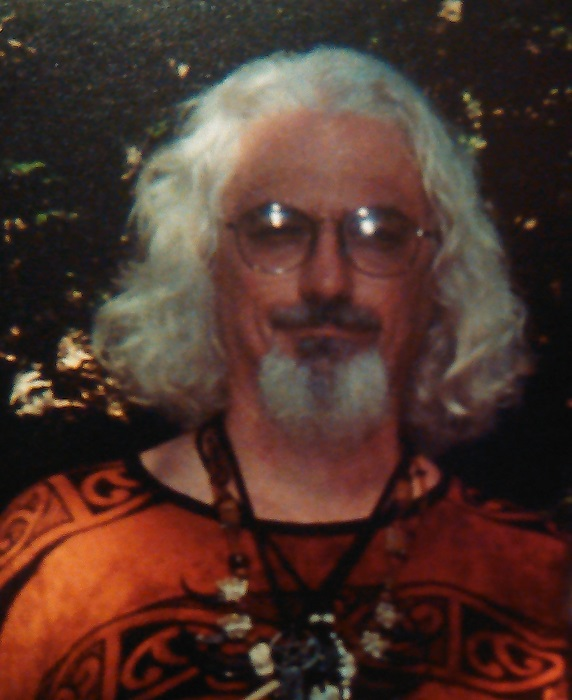
- Mark Shepherd, August 2003
- Born: Robert Marky Shepherd; September 19, 1961; Tampa, Florida, U.S.
- Died: May 24, 2011 (aged 49)
- Occupations: Novelist; short story writer; musician
- Writing career
- Genres: Fantasy, science fiction
- Notable works: Wheels of Fire (novel) with Mercedes Lackey, Elvendude (novel), Blackrose Avenue (novel), Spiritride (album)

Mark Shepherd (September 21, 1961 – May 24, 2011) was an American fantasy novelist and musician.

== Life and career ==
Born Robert Marky Shepherd on September 21, 1961 in Tampa, Florida, during the 1990s Shepherd was a writing protégé and live-in personal secretary of author Mercedes Lackey and artist Larry Dixon at Highflight, their Tulsa, Oklahoma residence.

He co-authored two novels with Lackey, and composed music to accompany his later books. He also wrote several short stories.

Shepherd's secretarial duties at Highflight were taken over by Englishman Paul Fisher in 2000.

During his later years, Mark founded Pagan Sanctum Recovery, a 12-step group for Pagans recovering from addictions of all kinds.

== Death ==
He committed suicide by shooting himself on May 24, 2011.

== Novels ==
=== Wheels of Fire ===
Shepherd's first published work was Wheels of Fire, a collaboration with Mercedes Lackey, and the 2nd novel in her SERRAted Edge series.

Intended to draw attention to the plight of abused children, Wheels of Fire focused on mother Cindy Chase's search for her son Jamie, who had been abducted by her estranged husband and kept prisoner by a religious cult. An epilogue to the story provided several hotline help numbers.

Wheels of Fire was later reprinted in the omnibus edition The Otherworld, which was made available in e-text format as part of Baen Books', on the disc included with initial hardcover printings of Mercedes Lackey and Roberta Gellis' This Sceptre'd Isle.

Alinor, protagonist of Wheels of Fire, briefly mentions an elf Grove located in Dallas, Texas, which is the primary setting for Shepherd's solo spin-offs.

=== Elvendude ===
Believing himself to be an ordinary teenager raised by a single mom, Adam McDaris discovers that his "mother" is in fact the local elf-king's daughter, who pledged to take her brother the Heir to safety, hiding him as a mortal to escape detection by the enemy who destroyed their home. The novel's plot involves an evil organization plotting world domination through the distribution of vials of magical crack cocaine.

=== Spiritride ===
The ghosts of human motorcycle riders get caught up in a war between the restored Elfhame Avalon and the drug-dealing Unseleighe Prince who plagues them.

=== Lazerwarz ===
With her brother secure on his rightful throne, adventurous elven Lady Samantha returns to the "real" world as an FBI agent, investigating a series of mysterious disappearances at a laser arcade in Tulsa.

=== The Bard's Tale ===
Collaborating again with Mercedes Lackey, Shepherd wrote Prison of Souls, the third novel in The Bard's Tale computer game tie-in novelization series.

Shepherd later followed it up with a solo sequel, Escape from Roksamur, reprising the adventures of his character Alaire.

=== Blackrose Avenue ===
Blackrose Avenue is Shepherd's 2001 standalone novel, set in a dystopic future wherein rebels struggle to free the country from the grip of a fanatic religious regime which has taken over. All those with HIV are put into concentration camps, according to the "Good Law."

== Music ==
Mark Shepherd composed music inspired by his writing, including full soundtracks to Elvendude, Spiritride, and Laserwarz.

Spiritride was released on cassette tape by Firebird Music. Blackrose Avenue, the CD is available via Yard Dog Press, publisher of the novel it accompanies.

== Appearances in other media ==
Mark Shepherd has a brief cameo in Mercedes Lackey's novel Jinx High, as a student attending a creative writing class. He was also the inspiration for her character Vanyel Ashkevron from The Last Herald Mage trilogy.

== Bibliography ==
- Wheels of Fire (1992 ISBN 0-671-72138-0) (series: Serrated Edge vol 2) with Mercedes Lackey
- Prison of Souls (1993 ISBN 0-671-72193-3) (series: The Bard's Tale vol. 3)
- Elvendude (1994 ISBN 0-671-87630-9) (series: Serrated Edge)
- Escape from Roksamur (1997 ISBN 0-671-87797-6) (series: The Bard's Tale)
- Spiritride (1997 ISBN 0-671-87775-5) (series: Serrated Edge)
- Lazerwarz (1999 ISBN 0-671-57806-5) (series: Serrated Edge)
- Blackrose Avenue (2001)
