= The Wizard of Karres =

2004 novel by Mercedes Lackey, Eric Flint and Dave Freer

First edition, cover art by Steve Hickman

The Wizard of Karres is a novel by Mercedes Lackey, Eric Flint, and Dave Freer that was published by Baen Books in 2004, as a sequel to The Witches of Karres by James H. Schmitz.

The book uses the same characters as the original novel, and starts about where the original ended. The story describes how Captain Pausert is found to have klatha (psionic) powers that increase over the course of the story, where he is called a witch, a "hot witch", and finally a wizard.

== Plot summary ==
After safely arriving at the planet Emris at the end of the previous story, Captain Pausert is asked to transport the Nartheby sprite Hantis on an important mission so that she can meet with the Empress. Accompanying him is Goth, the Leewit, Hulik do Eldel, and Vezzarn from the original story, along with Pul, Hantis' talking grik-dog. They quickly learn that several groups are after them, presumably attempting to learn the secret of their Sheewash drive, which they have used when they need to escape from a difficult situation.

They eventually learn that their mission is to prevent a plague of nanites from taking control of people. They are being hunted by the ISS (secret service) which is under the influence of the nanites, the remaining gang of Agandar the pirate who is after the drive, and Sedmon, the Daal of Uldune (a planet that caters to pirates and others who have covert needs) who is also after the drive. They land on Vaudevillia, a planet for carnivals, and join up with Petey, Byrum and Keep, "The Greatest Show in the Galaxy". Eventually Agandar's lieutenant catches up with them, and is killed in a sword fight during a Shakespearian play. The Daal of Uldune arrives shortly later, reveals that he has been trying to help them, agrees to fund the carnival, and travels with them.

At one point, Pausert and his group (except Hulik) separate from the carnival and are taken back in time to meet one of Hantis' ancestors. The same nanite plague is happening in that time period, and Pausert is able to stop the plague from spreading. Upon returning to their own time, they are able to meet the empress and stop that plague as well. Pausert learns that the witches of Karres deliberately did not teach him how to use his klatha powers because he had the inherent ability to exceed their capabilities if allowed to learn on his own.
