= The Last Herald-Mage =

Trilogy of fantasy novels by Mercedes Lackey

- 1990 omnibus edition
- Magic's Pawn; Magic's Promise; Magic's Price
- Author: Mercedes Lackey
- Cover artist: Jody Lee; Dawn Wilson
- Country: United States
- Language: English
- Genre: Fantasy
- Publisher: DAW Books
- Published: 1989–90
- Media type: Print

The Last Herald-Mage is a trilogy of fantasy novels by American author Mercedes Lackey, published from 1989 to 1990. The story centers around a mage named Vanyel Ashkevron who lives in the fictional kingdom of Valdemar. It was the first high fantasy series with a gay protagonist from a mainstream publisher, and was well-received by critics, many of whom regard it as Lackey's best work.

== Background ==
Many of Lackey's works, including The Last-Herald Mage, are set in the fictional land of Valdemar. Her first series in that world was the Arrows trilogy, published from 1987 to 1988. In the world's internal chronology, it is followed by the Mage Winds trilogy (1991–93), the novel Winds of Fury (1994), the Mage Storms trilogy (1994–96), and the Owl Mage series (1997–98). Lackey also wrote several prequels to these works, including the Mage Wars trilogy (1993–96), which occurs a millennium before the other novels, and The Last-Herald Mage trilogy, which is set 600 years before the Arrows trilogy.

The three books of the trilogy, Magic's Pawn, Magic's Promise, and Magic's Price, were released by DAW Books in June 1989, January 1990, and July 1990, respectively. The first editions were paperbacks, and Jody Lee designed the covers of the second and third books. An omnibus hardcover edition titled The Last Herald Mage followed in December 1990 from SFBC, with cover art by Dawn Wilson.

== Plot summary ==
In the series, Heralds are individuals with extrasensory or psychic abilities bonded with companions, magic sentient white horses, who have devoted their lives to using their abilities to help others in the kingdom of Valdemar. A small number of Heralds have mage capabilities and are called Herald-Mages.

=== Magic's Pawn ===
Vanyel Ashkevron, age sixteen, is the heir to a great estate, Forst Reach, though he does not measure up to what his father, Lord Withen, deems to be a "proper" man. He is devoted to music and cultivating an elegant appearance. Withen sends Vanyel to school in Haven, the capital of Valdemar, under the supervision of Vanyel's aunt Savil.

Savil has little interest in Vanyel because he has no psychic or magic powers, but realizes he is not as arrogant as Withen described. Vanyel finds schooling at Haven more suited to his nature, but is told he does not have the Bardic gift and cannot become a true Bard. Feeling he has lost his dream, he becomes depressed.

Vanyel develops feelings for Tylendel Frelennye, one of Savil's protégés. He learns that Tylendel is shay'a'chern, or homosexual. They become lovers and later find they are lifebonded, that is, soulmates. For the first time, Vanyel is truly happy. Tylendel introduces Vanyel to Gala, his Companion, one of the intelligent horse-like creatures that bond with Heralds.

Staven, Tylendel's twin brother, is assassinated by a family enemy. Tylendel senses his brother's death and goes mad with grief. Not understanding Tylendel's trauma, Vanyel continues supporting him as he seeks revenge. Using Vanyel's dormant energies Tylendel 'Gates' (essentially teleports) them to the enemy family. Tylendel casts a complicated spell, summoning deadly wyrsa to kill members of the enemy family. Gala repudiates Tylendel and dies, sacrificing herself to give time for Heralds to arrive to stop the massacre. Tylendel commits suicide, and the backlash from the 'Gate' spell tears open Vanyel's dormant magic potential.

Suffering from psychic and emotional damage, Vanyel is "chosen" by a Companion, Yfandes, who reassures him of her love and friendship and his worth. Vanyel begins recovering, but is unable to control his newly "opened" powers. He telepathically overhears thoughts blaming him for Tylendel's death. Vanyel attempts suicide, but is rescued, and the Heralds see that his love for Tylendel was real.

Savil, realizing Vanyel needs special assistance, takes him to the Tayledras, human beings who live in K'Treva, an environment immersed in magic. They teach him how to control his abilities and convince him that being gay is not wrong or sinful. Vanyel does not want to be a Herald or a Mage, and suspects the people around him value his powers, not himself. He runs away, but as he thinks things over, he realizes that Savil and the others have shown that they care about him. Just when he realizes that and moves to return, he discovers a village being terrorized by a colddrake, a type of dragon. Before he can even think to do anything, he witnesses the dragon killing an elderly man. He pulls himself together and kills the dragon, but the unfortunate timing gives Vanyel the impression that he is a coward. The Tayledras later explain that he is not at all cowardly and that his reactions were normal.

The Tayledras, now aware that the drakes were gated in from Vanyel's experience, Savil and Vanyel set out to check on a village that was under Tayledras protection and had fallen under an enemy shield. Upon arriving at this village Vanyel is left to assist in protecting the village from minor harm and instead finds himself face to face with a Blood magic–crazed wizard. In Vanyel's attempts to deflect the wizard's magic, he pulls on the power of a node and destroys the wizard with the raw power. He believes he will die as well, but is comforted by the thought that he will be with Tylendel. Vanyel wakes to find himself with his aunt in K'Treva as she presents him with the white robes of a full-fledged Herald-Mage.

=== Magic's Promise ===
Twelve years after the events of Magic's Pawn, Vanyel returns to Forst Reach amid growing tensions between Valdemar's western neighbors: the magic-distrusting Lineas and mage-ruled Baires. The King of Lineas had recently disinherited his eldest son, Prince Tashir, when the boy showed mage-powers. Rumors circulate that Tashir is the bastard son of Vedric Mavelan, a powerful Bairen mage. At Forst Reach, Vanyel crosses paths with the armsmaster, Jervis, who broke his arm as a child and Father Leren, the keep’s religious leader who has long disliked Vanyel for being gay.

Vanyel and Yfandes both sense violence occurring in the Linnean capital Highjorune. In Highjorune, they find Tahsir has been accused of slaughtering the entire Linean royal family, though he claims not to remember what happened. Vanyel offers Tashir refuge and does not believe Tashir to be responsible for the massacre. He returns to Highjorune for answers disguised as a ragged minstrel.

There, Vanyel learns both that Vedric has arrived in Highjorune and is calling for Tashir to be brought to justice and that Tashir was physically abused by his parents. He also finds that the city is situated on a particularly powerful magical node.

Returning to Forst Reach, Vanyel realizes that it's the anniversary of Tylendel's suicide and he falls into a deep depression. Tashir approaches him and Vanyel lashes out. When Tashir faints from fear of being turned over to Vedric rather than attacking Vanyel, he becomes convinced of Tashir’s innocence. He tells Tashir of Tylendel and resolves to remember the good times they shared, rather than just his loss.

Vanyel, Savil, Jervis and Tashir return to Highjorune to uncover who was responsible for the murders and their motive. Savil discovers a little-known clause in a treaty between Lineas and Baires stating that if the entire royal family of one nation dies, the other family will inherit the throne. They deduce that Vedric and the other Mavelans may have killed the Linean royals to gain access to the powerful magic node under the palace. Vedric had laid a magical trap that killed any blood-relation of Tashir's with Mage-potential. The Linean royal family and its servants were guardians of the node, all with Mage-potential, but not practicing mages. Tashir only survived because he used his Mage-Gift of Fetching to repel the summoned monsters.

Vedric, drawing power from all the Mavelan mages, tries to break into the palace. Savil and Tashir Gate to Haven before Vedric triggers the trap spell, now targeting Vanyel and his relatives of Mage-potential, including Savil and Jisa. Desperate, Vanyel draws an immense amount of power from the node and incinerates Vedric and the other Mavelans, but unleashes an earthquake in the process that destroys the palace. He manages to Gate Jervis and himself back to Forst Reach where they are immediately attacked by Father Leren. Leren stabs Vanyel in the stomach, and Vanyel uses the last of his strength to banish the dark magic controlling Leren and save Jervis.

Vanyel awakens in the presence of Death, who informs him that he is important enough to the future of Valdemar that he can choose between dying or returning to life. Upon learning that he is the best hope of Valdemar and its people against an unknown looming threat, Vanyel chooses to live. While approving, Death warns him that this path will lead him to immense pain and loneliness.

Vanyel revives in Forst Reach and learns that Leren, revealed to be an agent of Vedric, has been assassinated. Vanyal worries about the dark force he sensed and believes something beyond the Mavelans was controlling Leren. To Tashir’s distress, both Lineas and Baires claim Tashir as their rightful king. Vanyel proposes that Tashir become lord of both nations, but as a vassal of Valdemar. Vanyel reflects that the only way to keep his loved ones safe in the coming fight may be to send them away.

== Reception and awards ==
Many critics view The Last Herald-Mage trilogy as Lackey's best work. Published from 1989 to 1990, it was one of the earliest young adult works to feature a gay protagonist, and the first in high fantasy from a mainstream press. Some contemporary reviews underplayed or ignored its gay plot elements. In 1989, Library Journal described the book as a "richly detailed fantasy" and praised Lackey's characterization. While feeling that a gay protagonist might limit its readership, The San Diego Tribune praised the themes of "growing and healing and living to carry your weight". A review in the Lambda Rising Book Report found the protagonist Vanyel "warm and engaging" and called his relationship with Tylendel "spellbinding". In a similar viewpoint, critic Louse J. Winters wrote in 1994 that Vanyel was Lackey's "crowning achievement in characterization".

In 2019, a retrospective in Tor.com described the Herald-Mage books as "powerful stories about strength, magic, duty, love, and queer identity". The reviewer lauded the series for promoting queer acceptance and felt that Vanyel's story evoked a strong personal connection. In a similar view, Booklist said that Lackey's books helped normalize gay desire. Scholar Anne Balay has described the series as an influence on later queer fantasy novels such as Lynn Flewelling's Nightrunner.

Magic's Pawn was a finalist for the second annual Lambda Literary Awards in the category of Gay Science Fiction/Fantasy.

== Adaptations ==
In 2021, Radar Pictures acquired the television rights to the Valdemar novels. Ted Field is executive producer on the series with Anthony Tringali, Michael Napoliello and Maria Frisk producing for Radar Pictures. The first season is being developed as an adaptation of the Last Herald-Mage trilogy. Kit Williamson and Brittany Cavallaro were hired as writers and producers for the show.

== Selected editions ==
- Magic's Pawn (paperback). DAW Books. June 1989. ISBN 0-88677-352-0.
- Magic's Promise (paperback). DAW Books. January 1990. ISBN 0-88677-401-2.
- Magic's Price (paperback). DAW Books. July 1990. ISBN 0-88677-426-8.
- The Last Herald-Mage (hardcover omnibus). SFBC. December 1990. ISBN 0-7394-2295-2.

== Works cited ==
- Balay, Anne (2012). "'Incloseto Putbacko': Queerness in Adolescent Fantasy Fiction" (PDF). The Journal of Popular Culture. 45 (5). Wiley: 923–942. doi:10.1111/j.1540-5931.2012.00966.x.
- Bartel, Julie (2005). "Lackey, Mercedes Ritchie". In Cullinan, Bernice E.; et al. (eds.). The Continuum Encyclopedia of Young Adult Literature. Continuum. ISBN 978-0-82-641710-7.
- Brown, Charles N.; Contento, William G. (1999). "Lackey, Mercedes (Ritche)". The Locus Index to Science Fiction: 1984–1998. Locus. OCLC 47672336.
- Kenneally, Stephen (2016). "Hiding in Plain Sight: The Invisibility of Queer Fantasy". In Roberts, Jude; MacCallum-Stewart, Esther (eds.). Gender and Sexuality in Contemporary Popular Fantasy. Routledge. doi:10.4324/9781315583938-2. ISBN 978-1-317-13054-3.
- MacRae, Cathi Dunn (1998). Presenting Young Adult Fantasy Fiction. Twayne Publishers. ISBN 978-0-8057-8220-2.
- Reid, Robin Anne (2009). "Lackey, Mercedes (1950–)". Women in Science Fiction and Fantasy. Vol. 2. Greenwood Press. ISBN 978-0-313-33592-1.
- Winters, Louis J. (1994). "Lackey, Mercedes R.". In Berger, Laura Standley (ed.). Twentieth-Century Young Adult Writers. St. James Press. ISBN 978-1-55-862202-9.
