= The Ship Who Sang =

1969 novel by Anne McCaffrey

- First edition cover
- Author: Anne McCaffrey
- Cover artist: Jack Gaughan (first)
- Language: English
- Series: The Brain & Brawn Ship
- Genre: Science fiction
- Publisher: Walker & Co.
- Publication date: 1969
- Publication place: United States
- Media type: Print (hardcover)
- Pages: 248
- OCLC: 1663679

The Ship Who Sang (1969) is a science fiction novel by American writer Anne McCaffrey, a fix-up of five stories published 1961 to 1969. It is also the title of the 1961 novelette which is the first of these stories. The series started by the book, The Brain & Brawn Ship, is sometimes called The Ship Who Sang series.

The protagonist of the 1969 novel and all the early stories is a cyborg, Helva, a human being and a spaceship, or "brainship". The five older stories are revised under their original titles as the first five chapters of the book and the sixth chapter is entirely new.

McCaffrey dedicated the book "to the memory of the Colonel, my father, George Herbert McCaffrey, citizen soldier patriot for whom the first ship sang". In 1994 she named it as the book she is most proud of. Subsequently, she named the first story her best story and her personal favorite work.

During the 1990s McCaffrey made The Ship Who Sang the first book of a series by writing four novels in collaboration with four co-authors, two of whom each later completed another novel in the series alone. By 1997 there were seven novels, one old and six more recent. They share a fictional premise but feature different cyborg characters.

== Fictional premise ==
The Brain & Brawn Ship series is set in the future of the universe and in McCaffrey's Federated Sentient Planets. The parents of babies with severe physical disabilities—but fully developed and exceptionally talented brains—may allow them to become "shell people". Taking that option, physical growth is stunted, the body is encapsulated in a titanium life-support shell with capacity for computer connections, and the person is raised for "one of a number of curious professions. As such, their offspring would suffer no pain, live a comfortable existence in a metal shell for several centuries, and perform unusual service for Central Worlds".

After medication and surgery, general education, and special training, shell children come of age with heavy debts which they must work off in order to become free agents. They are employed as the "brains" of spacecrafts ("brainships"), hospitals, industrial plants, mining planets, and cities.

A brainship is able to operate independently but is usually employed in partnership with one "normal" person called a "brawn" who travels inside the ship much as a pilot would. A brawn is specially trained to be a companion and helper, the mobile half of such a partnership. The nickname is relative: the training is long and intense and the brawns must in fact be brainy people. Commonly the brain and brawn are paired at will and, for a fee, a brainship may terminate an assigned partnership.

McCaffrey explained the origin of the brainship premise to SFFworld in a 2004 interview: "I remember reading a story about a woman searching for her son's brain, it had been used for an autopilot on an ore ship and she wanted to find it and give it surcease. And I thought what if severely disabled people were given a chance to become starships? So that's how The Ship Who Sang was born".

== The short story ==
Anne McCaffrey had published two stories when she attended her first Milford Writer's Workshop in 1959. Afterwards she worked on The Ship Who Sang, which was published in The Magazine of Fantasy & Science Fiction (April 1961) and included by editor Judith Merril in the anthology 7th Annual of the Year's Best S-F (1962).

Helva scored well on encephalographic tests and her parents chose the shell option. She would be a brainship, an elite of her kind. "Brainships were, of course, long past the experimental stages" in her time. Supposedly, "the well-oriented brain would not have changed places with the most perfect body in the universe".

The story closes with brainship Helva singing "Taps" at the funeral service for her brawn Jennan. Decades later, son Todd McCaffrey called it "almost an elegy to her father". About that time, she called it her own favorite story, "possibly because I put much of myself into it: myself and the troubles I had in accepting my father's death [1954] and a troubled marriage", and also called it "the best story I ever wrote". She chose it to read aloud as Guest of Honor at the annual science fiction convention Eurocon 2007.

== Reception ==
Joanna Russ noted the steady increase in McCaffrey's command of her craft over the writing of the stories, saying "one of the pleasures of reading Ship is watching it progress from some rather awful gaucheries through the middling treatment of middling ideas to the final two sections in which the author at last begins to dramatize scenes with ease and some polish". Russ concluded that while the book suffers from a failure to rewrite the earlier work into a coherent whole, "even at its silliest the book has a contagious joyfulness".

== Criticism ==
In a 2010 essay, "The Future Imperfect", published in Redstone Science Fiction, disability rights advocate Sarah Einstein criticized The Brain & Brawn Ship series as a stand-in for science fiction in general for its use of disability. Regarding one novel in the series, The Ship Who Searched (1992) by McCaffrey and Mercedes Lackey, Einstein observed that:

the heroine of this book would have been helped by a future shaped by the actions of today's disability activists. Because, at its heart, this series of books tells the story of the enslavement of extremely promising children who have the bad luck to be born—or in this one case alone, become—disabled.

James Nicoll has noted that "[r]eaders worried that the setting is a bit ableist can rest assured that, in fact, the setting is enormously ableist".

== The early stories: Helva ==
The 1960s stories feature one shell person, Helva, who becomes brainship XH-834:

- "The Ship Who Sang", The Magazine of Fantasy & Science Fiction, April 1961
- "The Ship Who Mourned", Analog, March 1966
- "The Ship Who Killed", Galaxy Science Fiction, October 1966
- "Dramatic Mission", Analog, June 1969
- "The Ship Who Dissembled" (chapter title), published as "The Ship Who Disappeared", If, March 1969

All but the novella "Dramatic Mission" are novelettes, short fiction in 7500 to 17,500 words. They were incorporated in The Ship Who Sang novel (1969) as the first five chapters with a new closing chapter or short story, "The Partnered Ship". (Note: Both Hugo and Nebula awards define the novella category by word count 17,500 to 40,000. Novels are longer, novelettes shorter. The new sixth chapter is catalogued as a short story, or fiction in fewer than 7500 words. The Ship Who Sang (book) at ISFDB.)

McCaffrey wrote two more Helva novelettes:

- "Honeymoon", original to her collection Get Off the Unicorn (1977)
- "The Ship That Returned", original to Far Horizons: All New Tales from the Greatest Worlds of Science Fiction, edited by Robert Silverberg (1999)

== The Brain & Brawn Ship series ==
The Ship series comprises the Helva stories and six novels published in the 1990s by Baen Books. More than twenty years after the first book, McCaffrey returned to the premise in her first collaboration with Margaret Ball. She soon wrote Ship novels with three other co-authors, two of whom later wrote one alone.

Co-authored by Anne McCaffrey:

- PartnerShip (1992) with Margaret Ball. ISBN 0-671-72109-7
- The Ship Who Searched (1992) with Mercedes Lackey. ISBN 0-671-72129-1
- The City Who Fought (1993) with S. M. Stirling. ISBN 0-671-87599-X
- The Ship Who Won (1994) with Jody Lynn Nye. ISBN 0-671-87657-0

Separately authored:

- The Ship Errant (1996) by Jody Lynn Nye. ISBN 0-671-87854-9 (sequel to The Ship Who Won)
- The Ship Avenged (1997) by S. M. Stirling. ISBN 0-671-87861-1 (sequel to The City Who Fought)

These six novels were also issued in omnibus editions of two each. (Note: Brain Ships (2003. McCaffrey, Ball & Lackey): The Ship Who Searched and Partnership. ISBN 0-7434-7166-0; The Ship Who Saved the Worlds (2003, McCaffrey & Nye): The Ship Who Won and The Ship Errant. ISBN 0-7434-7171-7; The City and the Ship (2004, McCaffrey & Stirling): The City Who Fought and The Ship Avenged. ISBN 0-7434-7189-X)

== Awards ==
The fourth and longest story, "Dramatic Mission" (originally published in Analog, June 1969), was one of five nominees for both the annual Hugo Award and the annual Nebula Award in the Best Novella category. The Hugos are voted by paying participants in the World Science Fiction Convention and the Nebulas by members of the Science Fiction and Fantasy Writers Association. Both awards define the novella by word count 17,500 to 40,000.

The American Library Association in 1999 cited The Ship Who Sang and the two early Pern trilogies (Dragonriders and Harper Hall), when McCaffrey received the annual Margaret A. Edwards Award for her "lifetime contribution in writing for teens".
