= The Sleeping Beauty (novel) =

2010 novel by Mercedes Lackey

- First edition
- Author: Mercedes Lackey
- Language: English
- Series: Tales of the Five Hundred Kingdoms
- Genre: Fantasy novel
- Publisher: LUNA Books (Harlequin Enterprises)
- Publication date: 2010
- Publication place: United States
- Media type: Print (hardcover)
- Preceded by: The Snow Queen
- Followed by: Beauty and the Werewolf

The Sleeping Beauty is a novel by Mercedes Lackey, published in 2010 as the fifth book of the Tales of the Five Hundred Kingdoms series. As in the previous book, The Snow Queen, characters from earlier books are either mentioned or appear as secondary characters

== Background ==
The Sleeping Beauty was written by Mercedes Lackey as the fifth installment in her Tales of the Five Hundred Kingdoms series.

== Plot summary ==
Lily is the godmother to the Kingdom of Eltaria, which is quite wealthy due to its vast number of mines. After its queen dies, Lily takes on the appearance of an evil sorceress, with the name "Sable", and marries its king in name only, so that he won't be trapped into marrying a real evil sorceress and Princess Rosamund won't have a wicked stepmother. However, this doesn't stop the Tradition from focusing on Eltaria, particularly on Rosa, who ends up with two Traditional paths tangled up and directed at her: the Beauty Asleep and Snowskin. While her outer appearance is that of a Sleeping Beauty, Rosa ends up following the story of Snow White. Prince Siegfried of Drachenthal and Leopold of Falkenreid get into a fight over who will kiss Rosa awake. Rosa recovers from her ordeal before either one wins and begins training as a Godmother.

King Thurmand dies, leaving "Queen Sable" as Regent until Rosa turns twenty-one. This means that their enemies will descend on Eltaria, intent on taking over, unless measures can be taken to prevent it. Godmother Lily comes up with a plan for one hundred princes to come and take part in trials to see which one of them will win the hand of the princess. Siegfried and Leopold decide to stay and take part in the trials, and they strike a bargain to help each other through the trials until the last task. Another prince named Desmond enters the trials and catches Rosa's attention for a short while.

The first trial consists of a race on horseback, in full armor, with a break in the middle to herd three sheep into a pen and line up a dozen eggs without breaking them. The second test involves getting rid of a cursed item. The third trial involves the remaining princes answering a series of riddles. Other trials, perhaps dozens, are mentioned by type, but not detailed. By the time of the last trial, Rosa and Siegfried have fallen in love. The final trial is announced, in which the remaining ten princes have to come up with a way to protect Eltaria for the present and future, and marriage is not a solution. The prince with the best answer will be declared the winner and receive Rosa's hand in marriage.

The Huntsman and Desmond kidnap Rosa, invoking the Sleeping Beauty Tradition by locking her in a tower with thorns surrounding it. After a fight, Desmond is killed and Rosa is rescued. Siegfried wins her hand in marriage by proposing they have good dragons guard the borders. Queen Sable steps down and proclaims Rosa and Siegfried to be Queen and King of Eltaria.

== Sequel in the Harvest Moon anthology ==
In the Harvest Moon anthology, published in 2010, the story of Prince Leopold and Brunhilde continues. While doing their travels they end up in a country resembling ancient Greece. While they are resting a man in a black chariot comes up out of the ground and kidnaps Brunhilde, thinking she is Persephone. At the same time Hades is revealing himself to Persephone, who already knew who he was and agreed to go and be his consort. When they arrive in Hades's kingdom, they encounter a furious Brunhilde and the perplexing problem of how to get her back to the world of the living.

Meanwhile, Leopold has taken one of the flying horses he and his wife received at the start of their adventures and goes off to confront the Gods. They inform him that Demeter has left and Leopold immediately takes action to make sure the people of the land are taken care of. While he is taking care of that, Persephone and Brunhilde are tasked with making a pomegranate grow in the Elysian Fields, the only place in Hades's kingdom where something edible has grown.

In the end Persephone and Brunhilde successfully get one pomegranate to ripen and she earns the right to stay with Hades for part of the year. The solution to Brunhilde and Leopold's problem is found in a journey back to the world of the living, with Leopold in front being tempted and dealing with his own personal demons while not being able to turn around and look at Brunhilde, and Brunhilde behind having to work out her own internal problems without interfering in any way. They successfully complete the tasks and are reunited, with an added bonus: Brunhilde had demanded Leopold get some form of lasting immortality that did not backfire (such as making him grow old and live forever) and at the end of the story they are making it happen, even though it involves not being able to touch each other for a very long time.

== Critical reception ==
In a review by Publishers Weekly, the reviewer wrote that "despite plenty of twists and laughs, the plot is surprisingly forgettable, and most of the fun comes from finding all the fairy tale in-jokes peppering the pages".
