= Brainship =

Concept in science fiction

The concept brainship in science fiction literature refers to an interstellar starship that is created by inserting the disembodied brain and nervous system of a human being into a life-support system, and connecting it surgically to a series of computers via delicate synaptic connections (a brain–computer interface). The brain "feels" the ship (or any other connected peripherals) as part of its own body. Flying, taking off, landing, and controlling all the other features of the ship are as natural as moving, breathing and talking are to an ordinary human. Being wired into a computer speeds their reactions, but still allows their human brains to make intelligent decisions based on calculations.

== Publishing history ==
1941 – Solar Plexus by James Blish.

1945 – Camouflage by Henry Kuttner.

1953 – Mr. Spaceship by Philip K. Dick. A professor volunteers to become the first brain ship.

1953 – I, Dreamer (short story) by Walter M. Miller Jr.

1961 – The Ship Who Sang, by Anne McCaffrey. The brainship was popularized in this short story about the brainship Helva, but McCaffrey cited as her inspiration an earlier story. In her statement:

I remember reading a story about a woman searching for her son's brain, it had been used for an autopilot on an ore ship and she wanted to find it and give it surcease. And I thought what if severely disabled people were given a chance to become starships? So that's how The Ship Who Sang was born.

— Anne McCaffrey, Anne McCaffrey: Heirs to Pern, Locus magazine

1964 – The Fiend by Frederik Pohl. In this short story, criminals had their brains temporarily removed so they could serve their sentences as control units for various types of machinery. One was mentioned as being the controller of a brain ship.

1965 – "Becalmed in Hell", by Larry Niven. This short story was about Eric, an injured man who became a brainship, and his mobile partner Howie. Eric could not take off from the hazardous surface of Venus because he "felt" something wrong with his "wings". Howie had to find a solution before they both died.

1965 - Wasted on the Young by John Brunner. A young man deliberately accrues huge debts with a flamboyant lifestyle, then tries to escape them by committing suicide. His brain is saved, put into a ship, and sent on a voyage long enough to pay all his debts.

1965 – "The Brain of Colonel Barham" (TV episode, The Outer Limits). The military plans to use the Colonel's disembodied brain to control a spacecraft.

1965 – Destination: Void by Frank Herbert, where an interstellar sleeper ship is controlled by an Organic Mental Core, a human brain.

1966, 1969 – Additional short stories by McCaffrey. These short stories were published in The Ship Who Sang collection.

1979 – Mayflies, by Kevin O'Donnell Jr. A human brain is reprogrammed to serve as a ship's computer for a colonization trip expected to take 15 years (ship's time). The original human personality, which the shipbuilders had believed to have been erased, reasserts itself. It inadvertently turns off the main drive early in the mission, stretching the flight time to hundreds of years. The human personality struggles against the imposed programming.

1992–1994 – Additional novels, co-written by McCaffrey.

1996 – The Ship Errant, a novel by Jody Lynn Nye.

1996 - Mechanized Assault & Exploration - The player takes the role of the brain of such a ship, a 'MAX commander', the result of the radical surgery needed for biological life to survive hyperspace, and then take command of the fighting forces for the colonial prospect at the end of that trip against other human factions for alien sponsors.

1997 – The Ship Avenged, a novel by S. M. Stirling.

1994 – Starfire board wargame, Alkelda Dawn expansion, originally created in 1979 by Stephen V. Cole. This "4X" (eXplore, eXpand, eXploit, and eXterminate) board wargame simulates space warfare and empire building in the 23rd century. In it, the J'rill are a race of cybernetic brainships. Originally humanoid, their meritocracy needed to process more and more information as their world grew and computerized. Development of brain–computer interfaces improved their services to society, but the Directors became more distant from their bodies as technology advanced. Eventually, their bodies required only life support, making them effectively immortal. As they lost their humanity, their policy decisions became heartless, eventually leading to civil war. The J'rill Directors suppressed the revolt by destroying nearly all of their subjects.

1999 – Homeworld: Neuroscientist Karan S'jet was neurally wired into the "Kushan" mothership as "Fleet Command" to replace an unsustainably large crew.

== Weaknesses ==
- The remaining human physical parts of the fictional brainship (brain, nervous system, possibly others) must be maintained on constant life support. Any interruption is life-threatening.
- The encased brain is usually completely dependent on its electronic connections for all sensory input, including communication with other sapient beings. Losing access to this input results in complete sensory deprivation so severe that extended periods of such isolation can cause psychological damage to the brain's personality, including catatonia and permanent insanity.
- The sheer bulk of a brainship makes it ill-suited to performing certain tasks. To this end, fictional brainships generally have a mobile partner(s).

== Protection ==
In McCaffrey's stories the ship's physical component is encased in a "shell" with life support and connections to the ship's computers. The mobile human partner is referred to as a "Brawn", a specially trained companion and aide. In her stories, brain/brawn partnerships can be short-lived and professional, lasting only as long as the mission, or they may be long, deep, meaningful friendships. In some cases, they may fall in love. Brawn obsession was formerly a serious concern, as a love-crazed brawn might have attempted to breach the life-support shell in order to get at the body entombed within, only to kill the person and go mad with grief. This possibility was effectively eliminated by the brainship Hypatia Cade (during the events of the book The Ship Who Searched) through the invention and creation of human-replica prosthetic bodies that shellpeople could project their consciousness into through short-range, high-bandwidth transmission.

In Niven's story, ambulatory partner Howie found no mechanical reason for brainship Eric's claim of immobility, which was endangering both of their lives. Howie could not examine Eric's physical body without harming him. Eric could not come up with evidence to convince Howie, and had no way to help himself. Howie concluded privately that the problem is psychological, and risked his life with a ruse which enabled Eric to take off. When they escape and Eric was checked out by maintenance personnel the truth was discovered.

In the Starfire board game, the J'rill directors destroyed nearly all of their subjects during a revolt/civil war. This also meant loss of materials and repairs for their life support and cybernetic systems. The J'rill spread out into space to conquer star systems for resources. They depended upon drones for ordinary tasks, and remotes for more independent tasks such as combat.
