= Kit Williamson =

American actor and filmmaker

- Born: November 13, 1985 (age 40); Jackson, Mississippi, U.S.
- Occupations: Actor, filmmaker
- Spouse: John Halbach (m. 2016)

Kit Williamson (born November 13, 1985) is an American actor and filmmaker. He is known for creating, writing, directing, and starring in the dark comedy series EastSiders on Netflix. For his work on the series, he has been nominated for several Indie Series Awards and Daytime Emmy Awards.

== Early life ==
He was born and raised in Jackson, Mississippi and attended Interlochen Arts Academy, an arts boarding school in northern lower Michigan. He later attended Fordham University and received his MFA from UCLA's School of Theater, Film and Television.

== Career ==
=== EastSiders ===
In 2012, Williamson created the web series EastSiders; two episodes were launched on YouTube in December 2012. Williamson crowdfunded the remaining episodes on Kickstarter, raising over $25,000. The subsequent second and third seasons were also successfully crowdfunded through Kickstarter. In 2014, Wolfe Video became the series official distributor. The series was sold to Netflix in 2016, and a third season was released in 2017. The series has received critical acclaim since its release.

Writing for IndieWire, Williamson explained his inspiration for the series:

My goals when I created the show were simple; I wanted to write, direct and star in a project and see it through to completion, because I had been involved in so many micro budget projects that never saw the light of day. I also wanted to create the kind of LGBT series that TV networks refuse to, one where the main characters were not only gay, but flawed, complex individuals trying to navigate their messy lives, just like their straight friends.

For his work on EastSiders, Williamson received a Daytime Emmy Award nomination for Outstanding Digital Daytime Drama Series, as well as several Indie Series Award nominations.

=== Unconventional ===
In 2025, Williamson released his follow up series Unconventional on the LGBTQ streaming network Revry. In addition to creating, writing and directing he also starred in the series as Noah, a queer millennial questioning the future of his 10-year marriage to his husband Dan (James Bland). At the same time, Noah becomes the sperm donor to his sister Margot's wife, Eliza. Each episode follows a month of the pregnancy.

Other leads include Beau Bridges, Kathy Griffin, Willam, Jenna Ushkowitz, Tuc Watkins, Dana Wheeler-Nicholson, James Urbaniak, Constantine Rousouli, Laith Ashley, Aubrey Shea, Briana Venskus and James Bland. Bland also served as a producer, writer and director on the series.

=== Other work ===
Williamson has worked as an actor on stage, television, and in film. He appeared in the Broadway premiere of Eric Bogosian's Talk Radio, starring Liev Schreiber, which ran from March 11 to June 24, 2007. Other stage performances include the Off-Broadway premiere of Przemyslaw Wojcieszek's Made in Poland. For this performance in Made in Poland, Williamson earned a positive review in Variety: "Williamson's hilariously serious perf as an angst-filled wannabe revolutionary strikes exactly the right note. As he wanders around his little town in post-Communist Poland, vandalizing cars and trashing phone booths, the unfairness of everything becomes so oppressive he delivers Bogus' every line like it's a prelude to a fistfight."

His television roles include a recurring role on the AMC series Mad Men, from 2013 to 2015, as well as supporting roles on Numb3rs (2009), Death Valley (2011), and The Good Wife (2015).

In 2021, Williamson was announced alongside Brittany Cavallaro as a writer and producer for the television adaptation of Mercedes Lackey's Valdemar novel series. The first season will adapt Lackey's Last Herald-Mage trilogy. The show is being developed by Radar Pictures with Ted Field as Executive Producer.

Williamson said that his connection the trilogy's gay protagonist enamored him with the books, telling Deadline:

Vanyel in The Last Herald Mage series was one of the first gay characters I encountered, and as a recently out 16-year-old I can't stress enough the impact that these books had on me. The Valdemar series was far ahead of its time in the portrayal of LGBTQ characters, and Lackey's writing afforded them a level of depth and complexity that is still very rare, especially in genre storytelling.

== Personal life ==
Williamson is gay and has been married to his EastSiders co-star John Halbach since February 27, 2016.
