= The Ship Who Searched =

1992 novel by Anne McCaffrey and Mercedes Lackey

- First edition cover
- Author: Anne McCaffrey and Mercedes Lackey
- Cover artist: Stephen Hickman
- Language: English
- Series: The Brain & Brawn Ship
- Genre: Science fiction
- Publisher: Baen Books
- Publication date: 1992
- Publication place: United States
- Media type: Print (paperback)
- Pages: 312
- ISBN: 0-671-72129-1
- Preceded by: PartnerShip
- Followed by: The City Who Fought

The Ship Who Searched is a science fiction novel by American writers Anne McCaffrey and Mercedes Lackey. It is the third of seven books in The Brain & Brawn Ship (also known as The Ship Who Sang) series by McCaffrey and four other authors, and the only one by Lackey. It was first published as a serial in the monthly Amazing Stories, June to September, and as a paperback original by Baen Books in August 1992.

The Ship Who Searched follows the adventures of Hypatia Cade, whom an alien virus renders quadriplegic. Her only hope for a good life, free of the prison her body has become, is to enter the BB Program, named for Brain and Brawn. She does so, and becomes a brainship, a cyborg human being and interstellar spacecraft. The book begins when she contracts the virus at age seven and features her adventures as AH-1033 with her "brawn" Alex, the human partner whom she secretly loves.

== Premise ==
Hypatia or AH-1033 is unique among protagonists of the Brain & Brawn Ship series in that she is disabled as a child rather than at birth. The premise introducing the series is that the parents of babies with severe physical disabilities but fully developed brains may allow them to become "shell people". Taking that option, physical growth is stunted, the body is encapsulated in a titanium life-support shell with capacity for computer connections, and the person is raised for "one of a number of curious professions. As such, their offspring would suffer no pain, live a comfortable existence in a metal shell for several centuries, performing unusual service for Central Worlds".

Shell children do come of age with heavy debts which they must work off in order to become free agents. They are employed as the "brains" of spacecraft "brainships", hospitals, and so on, even cities. A brainship is able to operate independently but is usually employed in partnership with one "normal" person called a "brawn" who travels inside the ship much as a pilot would. A brawn is specially trained to be a companion and helper, the mobile half of such a partnership. The nickname is relative: the training is long and intense and the brawns must be brainy people in fact.

== Criticism ==
The Ship Who Searched is the specific reference for "The Future Imperfect" by disability rights advocate Sarah Einstein, a critique of the Brain & Brawn Ship series representing science fiction and modern convention in general. Einstein observed that 40 years later they have

many more technological wonders than McCaffrey had imagined. The protagonists in the story would have been much helped, for instance, by a secure communications channel and a GPS system, both of which I have in my battered old car. But most of all, the heroine of this book would have been helped by a future shaped by the actions of today's disability activists. Because, at its heart, this series of books tells the story of the enslavement of extremely promising children who have the bad luck to be born—or in this one case alone, become—disabled.

The essay serves as a call for reader-submitted stories that incorporate its values. Einstein concluded:

This is not the sort of future disability advocates envision. No, we see a future without stairs. ... How will science help us build fully inclusive communities?

There is too little science fiction written that envisions a fully accessible, universally designed future. And so we are asking you, gentle readers, to do just that.

The editors later posted some clarifying notes by Einstein with the contest details. Evidently a winning essay was published in Redstone Science Fiction, September 2010.
