= Roberta Gellis =

American writer

- Born: Roberta Leah Jacobs Gellis; September 27, 1927
- Died: May 6, 2016 (aged 88); Michigan, U.S.
- Resting place: Great Lakes National Cemetery, Holly, Michigan, U.S.
- Education: Hunter College (BA)
- Occupation: Writer
- Spouse: Charles Gellis (m. 1946)
- Children: 1
- Parent(s): Morris B. Jacobs; Margaret Segall Jacobs
- Writing career
- Genres: Historical fiction; historical romance; fantasy

Roberta Leah Jacobs Gellis (September 27, 1927 – May 6, 2016) was an American writer of historical fiction, historical romance, and fantasy. She held master's degrees in both biochemistry and medieval literature.

Many major writers of historical romance cite her as an important influence. She has collaborated with Mercedes Lackey on historical-fantasy fiction.

== Early life and education ==
She was born September 27, 1927, to Margaret Segall Jacobs and Morris B. Jacobs. Gellis grew up in Brooklyn.

She earned a B.A. in chemistry and English in 1947 at Hunter College, and master's degrees in biochemistry and medieval literature. Gellis worked in New York City as a research chemist for about a decade before becoming a writer.

== Writing career ==
After leaving her research lab job when her son was born, Gellis wrote her first novels, Bond of Blood and Knight's Honor, in the 1960s. She went on to write more than fifty novels. These included more than twenty historical romances, including the Roselynde Chronicles and the Heiress Series, medieval murder mysteries, historical fantasies, space opera, and a mystery featuring Lucrezia Borgia as an amateur detective. Her pseudonyms included Max Daniels, Priscilla Hamilton, and Leah Jacobs. In 1981, the publisher of Romantic Times named Gellis as one of the most popular historical romance authors.

== Personal life and death ==
She married Charles Gellis on April 14, 1946, and they had one son. Gellis died on May 6, 2016, in Michigan and is buried at Great Lakes National Cemetery in Holly, MI.

== Awards ==
- Best Series Writer of 1983, Romantic Times
- 1984 Porgie Gold Medal for best historical romance, West Coast Review of Books
- 1986 Romance Writers of America Lifetime Achievement Award

== Books ==
=== Pseudonymous books ===
Gellis wrote books published under at least three pseudonyms.

- The Psychiatrist's Wife (1966), as Leah Jacobs
- Space Guardian (1977), as Max Daniels
- Offworld (1979), as Max Daniels
- The Love Token (1979), as Priscilla Hamilton

=== Fantasy and science fiction ===
- Offworld
- The Space Guardian
- Irish Magic (contributor)
- Irish Magic II (contributor)
- Overstars Mail

=== Greek mythology ===
- Dazzling Brightness
- Shimmering Splendor
- Enchanted Fire
- Bull God
- Thrice Bound

=== Medieval books ===
- Knight's Honor
- Bond of Blood
- The Dragon and the Rose
- The Sword and the Swan
- The Rope Dancer
- Masques of Gold

==== The Royal Dynasty series ====
- Siren Song
- Winter Song
- Fire Song
- A Silver Mirror

==== The Roselynde Chronicles ====
- Roselynde
- Alinor
- Joanna
- Gilliane
- Rhiannon
- Sybelle
- Desiree

==== Tales of Jernaeve ====
- Tapestry of Dreams
- Fires of Winter

=== Napoleonic era ===
- The English Heiress
- The Cornish Heiress
- The Kent Heiress
- Fortune's Bride
- A Woman's Estate

=== Gellis and Mercedes Lackey ===
Gellis and Mercedes Lackey wrote four prequels in the Baen Books series "Serrated Edge", whose first four novels Lackey co-wrote with others from 1992 to 1994. These are Gellis's works most widely held in WorldCat libraries.

- This Scepter'd Isle (2004)
- Ill Met by Moonlight (2005)
- By Slanderous Tongues (2007)
- And Less Than Kind (2008)

=== Mysteries ===
==== Magdalene la Bâtarde series ====
Historical mysteries featuring 12th-century madam-turned-amateur detective Magdalene la Bâtarde:

- A Mortal Bane (1999)
- A Personal Devil (2001)
- Bone of Contention (2002)
- Chains of Folly (2006)

==== Other ====
Featuring Lucrezia Borgia:

- Lucrezia Borgia and the Mother of Poisons (2003)

=== Other ===
- A Delicate Balance
- Sing Witch, Sing Death
