= Larry Dixon (fantasy artist) =

American fantasy artist and writer (born 1966)

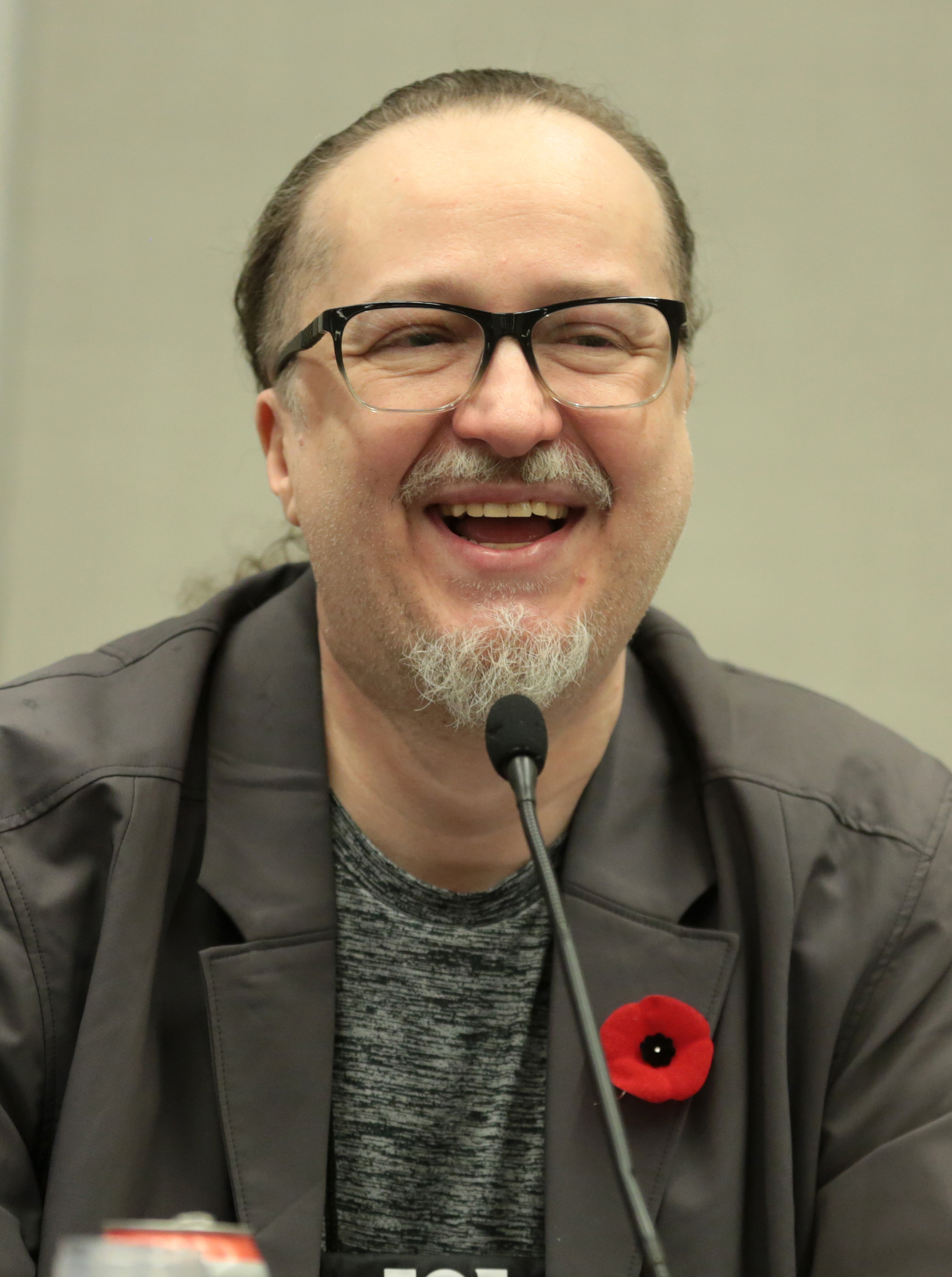
- Larry Dixon at the 2018 Phoenix Comic Fest
- Born: July 28, 1966
- Occupations: Fantasy artist and novelist
- Spouse: Mercedes Lackey
- Writing career
- Genres: fantasy, role-playing games

Larry Dixon (born July 28, 1966) is an American fantasy artist, birds-of-prey rehabilitation specialist, and novelist. He has collaborated with his wife, fantasy author Mercedes Lackey, on multiple books.

== Background ==
Dixon, the son of a Delta Force career commando, studied at The North Carolina School of the Arts and at Savannah College of Art & Design. In 1992, he married fantasy author Mercedes Lackey. They live in the Tulsa, Oklahoma area. Dixon, a sports car enthusiast, is also a storm spotter and volunteer firefighter.

== Writing ==
Larry has collaborated with his wife, Mercedes Lackey, on a number of her books, including:

- Storm Breaking (illustrator)
- The Mage Wars Trilogy (DAW)
  - The Black Gryphon (co-author)
  - The White Gryphon (co-author)
  - The Silver Gryphon (co-author)
- The SERRAted Edge Novels (Baen)
  - Chrome Circle (co-author)
  - Born to Run (co-author)
- The Owl Trilogy (DAW)
  - Owlflight
  - Owlsight (co-author)
  - Owlknight (co-author)

== Artwork ==
Dixon has contributed artwork to several roleplaying games, including GURPS and Talislanta, and to Wizards of the Coast's Dungeons & Dragons source books, including Oriental Adventures, Epic Level Handbook, and Fiend Folio. His skill with depicting birds of prey has often led to commissions with the United States Military and with Save Our American Raptors, an organization devoted to raptor rehabilitation.

== Other work ==
As a birds-of-prey rehabilitation specialist, Dixon, along with Lackey, has returned over four hundred hawks, owls, falcons and corbies into the wild.

Dixon's wildlife rehabilitation led to a minor role in the creation of the digital effects for the giant eagles in the Lord of the Rings movies. Dixon took digital photographs of a stuffed golden eagle he is currently keeping for its owner, a local tribal elder. These photographs, along with castings of the beak and talons, were sent to Weta Digital in New Zealand to provide texture mapping for the digital model for Gwaihir and the other great eagles of J. R. R. Tolkien's Middle-earth.

== Appearances ==
Guest of Honor appearances include:

- CrackerCon (1992)
- ICON 17 (1992)
- FenCon II (2005)
- Lunacon 2009
- GenCon 2013
- InConJunction 2017
