= Dave Freer =

South African–Australian author (born 1959)

- Born: 1959 (age 66–67); South Africa
- Occupations: Novelist, short story author
- Writing career
- Period: 1999–present
- Genre: Science fiction
- Website: www.davefreer.com

Dave Freer is a South African–born, Australian-based, award-winning science fiction author writing mostly humorous or alternate history novels.

== Biography ==
Freer was born and educated in South Africa, where he grew up on the outskirts of a city next to a 500-acre nature preserve of coastal bush. His father worked as a member on a commercial fishing boat on weekends. After a stint in boarding school, where he learned "smoking, strong drink and pursuit of wild women", he was conscripted at the age of 17 into the South African Defence Force and deployed to the Angolan border as a medic (his last choice). Recalling the experience, he noted, "My choices were five years in jail, leave the country, or go in for a year. I'm a strong swimmer, but the Atlantic seemed too large...."

The year stretched into two. Following his service, he married, attended university, and became an ichthyologist, later working as a research officer for the Western Cape commercial shark fishery. To supplement his income and alleviate the monotony of writing "amazingly dull" papers on fishery matters, he moonlighted as a commercial diver for a mussel farm. He eventually managed a fish farm, but after the operation was forced to close due to circumstances beyond his control, he began to pursue a careen in write. Six years and 74 rejections later, his first book, The Forlorn, was published by Baen Books.

Dave is an experienced rock-climber and has opened many routes near Morgan's Bay in the Eastern Cape (South Africa). His other interests include cooking, wine tasting, fly-fishing and diving.

For many years he lived near Mount West in the Kwa-Zulu Natal Midlands with his wife, Barbara, and two sons, Paddy and James. In early 2010 he and his wife emigrated to Flinders Island, in the Australian state of Tasmania. He and his family are now naturalized Australians.

Dave has his own forum at Baen's Bar, a website, and a blog about "the Freer Family's adventures and misadventures emigrating to Flinders Island". His literary agent in the United States is the OnyxHawk agency.

== Awards ==
His 2008 Novel, Slow Train to Arcturus, won the Best Science Fiction and Fantasy Novel in the Preditors & Editors Readers Poll 2008.

In 2022 he published Cloud-Castles, which won a Prometheus Award.

His 2025 novel Storm-Dragon won a Prometheus Special Award for Young Adult Fiction.

== Bibliography ==
=== Drowned World ===
This young adult steampunk is set in an alternate 1970s earth where one scientific discovery was never made leading to massive global warming.

- Cuttlefish launches the series and was released 07/12 by Pyr. ISBN 1616146257

ISBN 978-1616146252

- Steam Mole is the follow-up novel revolving around the same cast 12/12 by Pyr. ISBN 1616146923

ISBN 978-1616146924

=== Assiti Shards Universe ===
==== 163x series ====
- A Lineman for the Country novella in Ring of Fire (Baen 2004) 0-7434-7175-X
- Diving Belle novella in Ring of Fire II (Baen 2008) 978-1416591443 with Gunnar Dahlin

=== Dragon's Ring series ===
1. Dragon's Ring (Baen 2009) 978-1-4391-3319-4
2. Dog and Dragon (Baen 2012) 978-1-4516-3811-0

=== Fish Story series ===
Short stories.

1. Fish Story, Episode 1 (2006) with Andrew Dennis and Eric Flint
2. Fish Story, Episode 2 (2006) with Eric Flint and Andrew Dennis
3. Fish Story, Episode 3 (2006) with Eric Flint and Andrew Dennis
4. Fish Story, Episode 4 (2006) with Eric Flint and Andrew Dennis
5. Fish Story, Episode 5 (2007) with Eric Flint and Andrew Dennis
6. Fish Story, Episode 6 (2007) with Andrew Dennis and Eric Flint
7. Fish Story, Episode 7: We're Going to Need a Bigger Pub (2007) with Andrew Dennis and Eric Flint
8. Fish Story, Episode 8: The Yellow Sub... (2007) with Eric Flint and Andrew Dennis
9. Fish Story, Episode Nine: Love at First Bite (2007) with Eric Flint and Andrew Dennis
10. Fish Story, Episode Ten: The A-Team (2007) with Eric Flint and Andrew Dennis
11. Fish Story, Episode Eleven, The End of Mankind (2008) with Andrew Dennis and Eric Flint
12. Fish Story, Episode Twelve: Make It More Complicated (2008) with Eric Flint and Andrew Dennis
13. Fish Story, Episode Thirteen, The Plot to End the Universe (2008) with Eric Flint and Andrew Dennis
14. Fish Story, Episode Fourteen, Punctiphobia: An Inordinate Fear of Spots (2008) with Andrew Dennis and Eric Flint
15. Fish Story, Episode Fifteen: They Came from Beyond (2008) with Eric Flint and Andrew Dennis

=== Heirs of Alexandria series ===
With Eric Flint and Mercedes Lackey. Set in an alternate "Venetian Empire" in which magic thrives. Note: a significant amount of text, and a couple of major characters in this work, are adapted from stories written by Lackey in the Merovingen Nights shared universe series. That series was started by C. J. Cherryh in her novel Angel with the Sword.

1. The Shadow of the Lion (Baen 2002) 0-7434-3523-0
2. This Rough Magic (Baen 2003) 0-7434-7149-0
3. A Mankind Witch (Baen 2005) 0-7434-9913-1
4. Much Fall of Blood (Baen 2010) 978-1-4391-3351-4
5. Burdens of the Dead (Baen 2013) 978-1-4516-3874-5
6. All the Plagues of Hell (Baen 2018) 978-1-4814-8361-2

=== Karres series ===
Expands the characters and situations in the novel The Witches of Karres by James H. Schmitz (1966) into a series.

- The Wizard of Karres (Baen 2004) 0-7434-8839-3 with Eric Flint and Mercedes Lackey
- The Sorceress of Karres (Baen 2010) 978-1-4391-3307-1 with Eric Flint

=== Pyramid series ===
1. Pyramid Scheme (Baen 2001) 0-671-31839-X
2. Pyramid Power (Baen 2007) 978-1-4165-2130-3

=== Rat, Bats and Vats series ===
1. Rats, Bats and Vats (Baen 2000) 0-671-31940-X
2. The Rats, the Bats and the Ugly (Baen 2004) 0-7434-8846-6

=== Novels and novellas ===
- The Forlorn (Baen 1999) 0-671-57831-6
- Crawlspace, military/social satire, with Eric Flint in JBU1.6 and in Best of JBU 2007
- Slow Train to Arcturus, with Eric Flint (Baen 2008) 978-1-4165-5585-8, winner of the Preditors & Editors Readers Poll 2008 for SF/F novel
- Stardogs (Magic Isle Press 2014) 978-0992549008
- Joy Cometh With The Mourning (Magic Isle Press 2014) 978-0992549022, a non-science fiction mystery.
- Changeling's Island (Baen 2016) 978-1476781204
- Tom (Magic Isle Press 2016) 978-0992549039
- Cloud-Castles (Magic Isle Press 2022) 978-0992549053, Prometheus Award winner
- Storm-Dragon (Raconteur Press 2025) 979-8315557562, juvenile science fiction. Prometheus Award finalist

=== Short stories ===
- "Genie out of the Vat", military SF, in Adventures in Far Futures (Baen 2005), edited by T. Weisskoph 978-0743498876
- "The Red Fiddler", with Eric Flint, in Bedlam's Edge Techno for Baen, 2005), edited by Rosemary Edghill and Mercedes Lackey.
- "Candyblossom" in Probe (SASF magazine) (2006), in JBU Volume 1.1, and in The Best of JBU 2006
- "The Tinta Falls Catfish" (Fish II), with Eric Flint and Andrew Dennis, in JBU Volume 1.2 (2006)
- "Flashing the Loch Ness Monster" (Fish III), with Eric Flint and Andrew Dennis, in JBU Volume 1.3 (2006)
- "Thin Ice" in JBU Volume 2.1 (2007)
- "The Yellow Submarine" (Fish VIII), with Eric Flint and Andrew Dennis, in JBU Volume 2.2 (2007)
- "Love at First Bite" (Fish XI), with Eric Flint and Andrew Dennis, in JBU Volume 2.3 (2007)
- "Jack October" in Fates Fantastic Anthology (Techno 2007), edited by Dan Hoyt
- "The End of Mankind" (Fish XIII), with Eric Flint and Andrew Dennis, in JBU Volume 2.5 (2008)
- Regency Fay in Something Magic This Way Comes (DAW 2008), edited by Sarah Hoyt
- "Boys" in The Future We Never Had (DAW 2008), edited by Rebecca Lickiss
- "Wetware 2.0" in Transhuman (Baen 2008), and in Approaching the Singularity Anthology (Baen), edited by Mark L. Van Name and Toni Weisskoph
- "The Witch's Murder", with Eric Flint, in The Dragon Done It (Baen 2008), edited by Mike Resnick and Eric Flint
- "The War, Me, Seventeen Million Dollars, and a Stripper", in Front Lines (Techno 2008), edited by Denise Little
- "The Poet Gnawreate and the Taxman" in Better Off Undead (Techno 2008), edited by Daniel M. Hoyt
- "Pirates of the Suara Sea", with Eric Flint, in Black Sails, Fast Ships (Nightshade 2008), edited by Jeff Vander Meer
- "Soot" in Witch Way to the Mall (Techno for Baen 2009), edited by Esther Friesner
- "Wolfy Ladies" in Strip Mauled (Baen 2009), edited by Esther Friesner
- "If Music be the Food of Love" in Fangs for the Mammaries (Baen 2010), edited by Esther Friesner
- "Pinked Djinn" in Andromeda Spaceways Inflight Magazine 42 (2010), edited by Edwina Harvey
- "Neither Sleet, Nor Snow, Nor Alien Monsters" in Citizens (Baen 2010), edited by John Ringo and Brian M. Thompson
- "Like Ghost Cat and a Dragon's Dog" in Free Short Stories 2012 (Baen 2012).
