= Mercedes Lackey =

American writer of fantasy novels (born 1950)

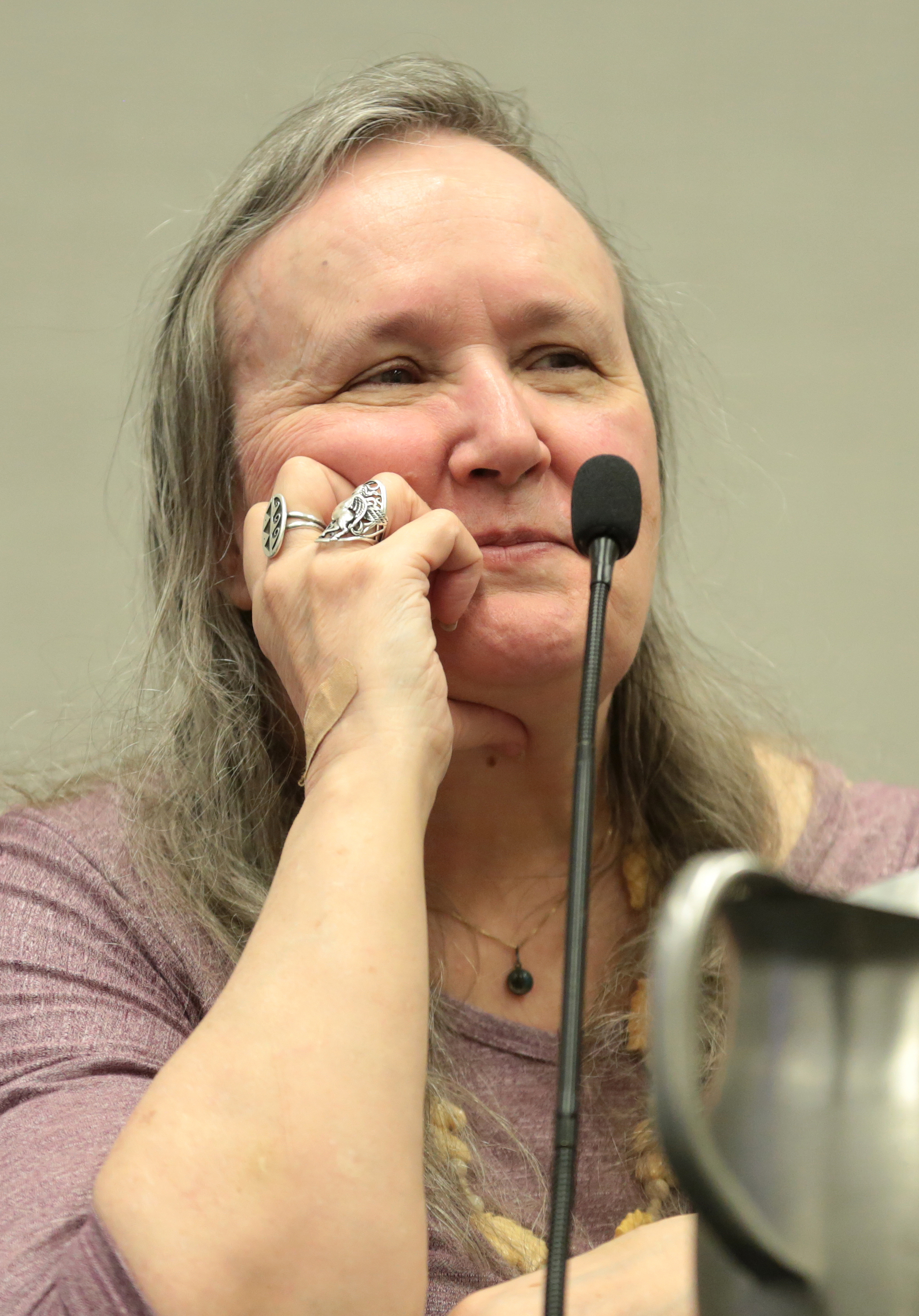
- Lackey at the 2018 Phoenix Comic Fest
- Born: June 24, 1950 (age 76); Chicago, Illinois, U.S.
- Education: Purdue University
- Occupations: Novelist, short story writer
- Spouses: Anthony Lackey (m. 1972; div. 1990) Larry Dixon (m. 1990)
- Writing career
- Period: 1985–present
- Genre: Fantasy
- Notable work: Valdemar series
- Website: mercedeslackey.com

Mercedes Ritchie Lackey (born June 24, 1950) is an American writer of fantasy novels. Many of her novels and trilogies are interlinked and set in the world of Velgarth, mostly in and around the country of Valdemar. Her Valdemar novels include interaction between human and non-human protagonists with many different cultures and social mores.

Her other main world is similar to Earth, but it includes clandestine populations of elves, mages, vampires, and other mythical beings. The Bedlam's Bard books describe a young man with the power to work magic through music; the SERRAted Edge books are about racecar-driving elves; and the Diana Tregarde thrillers center on a Wiccan who combats evil.

She has also published several novels re-working well-known fairy tales set in a mid-19th to early 20th century setting in which magic is real, although hidden from the mundane world. These novels explore issues of ecology, social class, and gender roles.

Lackey has published over 140 books and writes novels at a rate of 5.5 per year on average. She has been called one of the "most prolific science fiction and fantasy writers of all time." In 2021, Lackey was named the 38th Damon Knight Grand Master.

== Background ==
Lackey was born in Chicago. Her birth prevented her father from being called to serve in the Korean War.

She placed her meeting with science fiction at age 10 or 11, when she picked up her father's copy of James H. Schmitz's Agent of Vega. She then read Andre Norton's The Beast Master and Lord of Thunder and continued to read all of Norton's works. Lackey had difficulties obtaining enough interesting books from the public library to sate her passion for reading. She wrote for herself but without real direction or purpose until she attended Purdue University. Lackey graduated from Purdue in 1972.

While at Purdue, she took a one-on-one class of English Literature Independent Studies with a professor who was a fellow science fiction fan. He helped her analyze books she enjoyed and then use that knowledge. Lackey then encountered fan fiction, which further encouraged her writing. She began publishing work in science fiction fanzines and then discovered filk and had some filk lyrics published by Off Centaur Publications.

== Professional sales ==
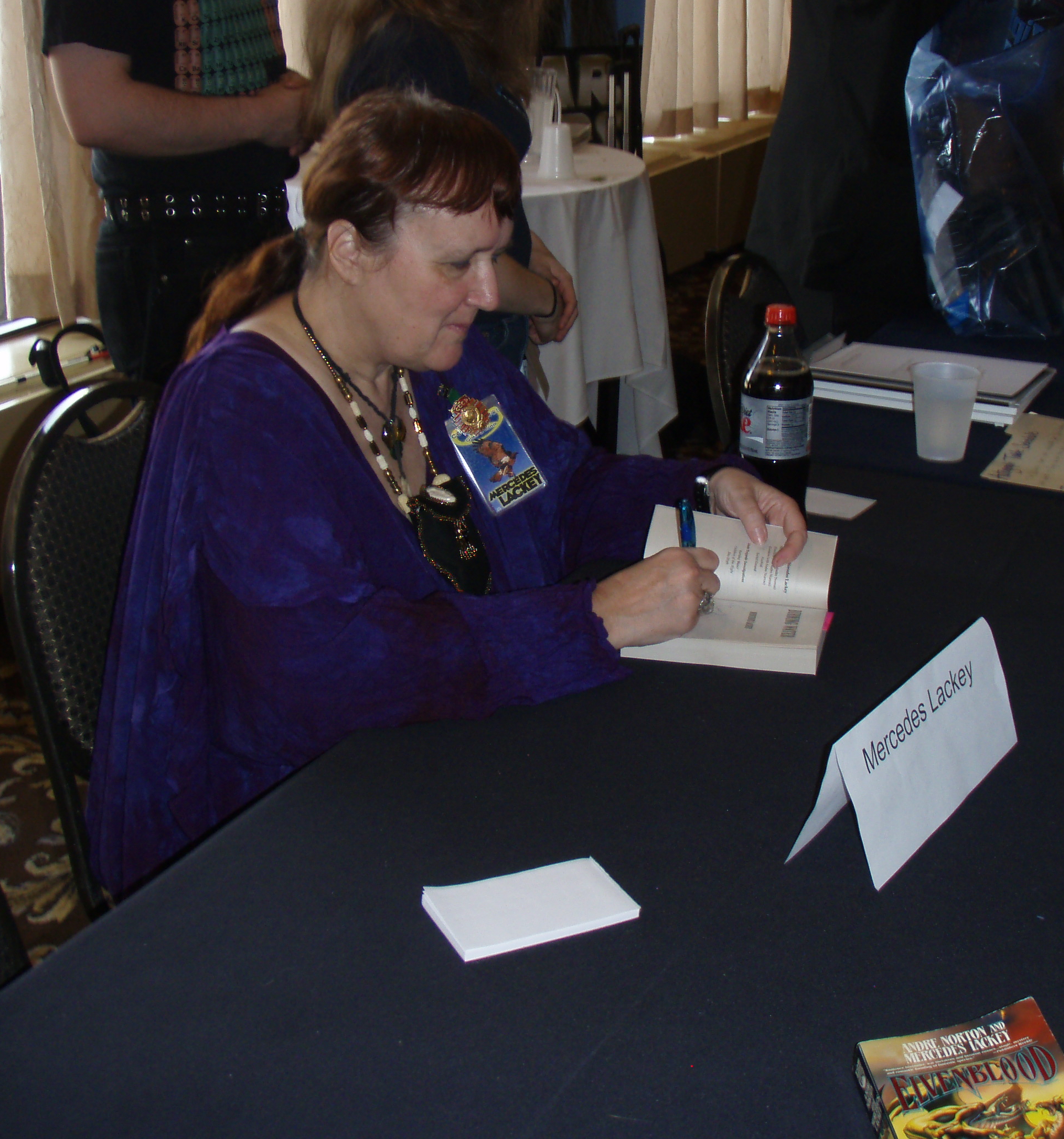
Lackey signing autographs at CONvergence, 2008

Lackey submitted a story to Sword and Sorceress, then sold the rewritten story to Fantasy Book Magazine. Her first sale was to Friends of Darkover.

She met C. J. Cherryh through filk. Cherryh helped Lackey through 17 rewrites of 'Arrows'. During this time, Marion Zimmer Bradley included Lackey's short stories in an anthology, Friends of Darkover. Lackey claims to have been writing so much during this time that she had no social life at all. She divorced Tony Lackey, and eventually married Larry Dixon.

=== Stance on fanfiction ===
Despite getting her own start as a fanfiction author, she and her agent forbade fan fiction based on her own books for many years, whether distributed offline or online. Lackey stated on her website that this was due to the 1992 Marion Zimmer Bradley fan fiction affair, when a fan accused Bradley of copying the fan's work and demanded writing credit and remuneration. After several years, Lackey's policy permitted offline fanfic, but only if the author got a release form from Mercedes Lackey that said the author acknowledged that they were using characters that belong to Mercedes Lackey and that the author's work essentially became Mercedes Lackey's property to prevent "infringing on my right to make a living from my own imagination". As of 2009 this policy changed, permitting fan fiction to be licensed as derivative fiction under the Creative Commons umbrella.

== Personal life ==
She married Anthony Lackey in 1972, and they divorced in 1990. In 1990, she met Larry Dixon at Circle Ouroboros convention in Meridian, MS. They married in 1992. The couple live outside of Tulsa, Oklahoma.

=== Other interests ===
Lackey and Dixon have in the past worked in raptor rehabilitation. She refers to her various parrots as her "feathered children". The afterwords to some of her books refer to rehabilitation and falconry, and this interest has influenced and informed her writing. She also enjoys beadwork, costuming, and needlework. She claims, however, to be a "wretched housekeeper, and by and large an indifferent cook" Besides this, she does radar-reading during tornado season. She helps support the Alex Foundation.

Historically, Lackey was active in the filking community. She was a major contributor to an early album of space filk, Minus Ten and Counting. She has won five Pegasus Awards, mostly for her songwriting. She was also active in the Society for Creative Anachronism and belongs to the Great Dark Horde.

She participates in The Stellar Guild series published by Phoenix Pick. The series pairs bestselling authors like Lackey with lesser known authors in science fiction and fantasy to help provide additional visibility to them.

== Related writers ==
Mercedes Lackey was a protégée of Marion Zimmer Bradley and got her start writing short stories in Bradley's story collections. Other mentors include writers C. J. Cherryh and Andre Norton, along with her editor, Elizabeth (Betsy) Wollheim of DAW Books.

Her earlier Velgarth novels are all solo projects, but later volumes in the Valdemar saga are illustrated by her husband, Larry Dixon, and in many of her latest works he is also credited as co-author. Many of her other novels are collaborations. She has worked with fantasy authors Andre Norton (such as the Halfblood Chronicles), Marion Zimmer Bradley (such as Rediscovery and Tigers Burning Bright), Anne McCaffrey (such as The Ship Who Searched), and Piers Anthony (If I Pay Thee Not in Gold). She has most recently written The Obsidian Trilogy with historian James Mallory, a historical fantasy series about an "alternative" Elizabeth I with romance writer Roberta Gellis, and the Heirs of Alexandria series with Dave Freer and Eric Flint.

== Adaptations ==
=== Television and film ===
On August 3, 2021, Deadline reported that Radar Pictures had acquired the television rights to the Valdemar novels and that Ted Field would be Executive Producer on the series. The first season is being developed as an adaptation of the Last Herald-Mage trilogy. Kit Williamson and Brittany Cavallaro have been announced as writers and producers for the show.

On October 8, 2023, Kit Williamson shared that this adaptation was "now "on hold," which is industry speak for dead" in a members-only post on his Patreon.
