= Anne McCaffrey bibliography =

List of works by Anne McCaffrey in publication order

This is a list of works by American science fiction and fantasy author Anne McCaffrey, including some cowritten with others or written by close collaborators.

== Restoree ==
McCaffrey's first novel was Restoree, published by Ballantine Books in 1967.

- Restoree (1967) ISBN 978-0-552-08344-7

== Federated Sentient Planets universe ==
Several of McCaffrey's series and more than half her books share as background a universe governed by the "Federated Sentient Planets" or "Federation" or "FSP".

=== Dragonriders of Pern series ===
McCaffrey's most famous works are the Dragonriders of Pern series.

==== Short stories and novellas ====
- "Weyr Search", Analog, October 1967 (later incorporated into Dragonflight)
- "Dragonrider", Analog – two parts, December 1967/January 1968 (later incorporated into Dragonflight)
- "The Smallest Dragonboy", Science Fiction Tales, edited by Roger Elwood (Rand McNally, 1973), reprinted in A Gift of Dragons and Get Off the Unicorn.
- "A Time When", NESFA Press, hardcover limited edition printed for guest of honor appearance at Boskone 1975, a convention in Boston (later incorporated into The White Dragon)
- "Rescue Run", Analog, August 1991 (later incorporated into The Chronicles of Pern: First Fall)
- "The P.E.R.N. Survey", Amazing, September 1993 (later incorporated into The Chronicles of Pern: First Fall)
- "The Dolphin's Bell", published as a limited edition, leatherbound book by Wildside Press, 1993 (later incorporated into The Chronicles of Pern: First Fall)
- "The Girl Who Heard Dragons", originally published as a Tor Book by Tom Doherty Associates in 1994, and in A Gift of Dragons, also by Cheap Street Press, 1986
- "Runner of Pern", Legends, an anthology edited by Robert Silverberg
- "Ever the Twain", A Gift of Dragons
- "Beyond Between", Legends II: New Short Novels by the Masters of Modern Fantasy, edited by Robert Silverberg

==== Books ====
in publication order: for a list in Pern historical order see Chronological list of Pern books

- "Weyr Search" (Analog, October 1967) – novella
- "Dragonrider" (Analog, December 1967 and January 1968) – novella
- Dragonflight (1968) ISBN 978-0-345-45633-5, ISBN 978-0-552-08453-6 – fix-up of "Weyr Search" and "Dragonrider"
- Dragonquest (1971) ISBN 978-0-345-33508-1
- "The Smallest Dragonboy" (1973, in Science Fiction Tales, edited by Roger Elwood); also in non-Pern collections Get Off the Unicorn and A Gift of Dragons
- "A Time When" (1975) (NESFA Press) ISBN 978-0-915368-07-5
- Dragonsong (1976) ISBN 978-0-689-86008-9
- Dragonsinger (1977) ISBN 978-0-689-86007-2
- The White Dragon (1978) ISBN 978-0-345-34167-9 – incorporating "A Time When"
- Dragondrums (1979) ISBN 978-0-689-86006-5
- Moreta: Dragonlady of Pern (1983) ISBN 978-0-345-29873-7
- Nerilka's Story (1986) ISBN 978-0-345-33949-2
- "The Girl Who Heard Dragons" (1986 novella); also in the non-Pern collection of the same name
- Dragonsdawn (1988) ISBN 978-0-345-36286-5
- The Renegades of Pern (1989) ISBN 978-0-345-36933-8
- All the Weyrs of Pern (1991) ISBN 978-0-345-36893-5
- "Rescue Run" (Analog, August 1991)
- The Chronicles of Pern: First Fall (1993) ISBN 978-0-345-36899-7 – Pern short story collection
  - "The Survey: P.E.R.N." (also in Amazing, September 1993)
  - "The Dolphins' Bell"
  - "The Ford of Red Hanrahan"
  - "The Second Weyr"
  - "Rescue Run" (1991)
- The Dolphins of Pern (1994) ISBN 978-0-345-36895-9
- Red Star Rising (hard) or Red Star Rising: Second Chronicles of Pern (paper) (1996) ISBN 978-0-552-14272-4; Dragonseye (US release) ISBN 978-0-345-41879-1
- The Masterharper of Pern (1998) ISBN 978-0-345-42460-0
- "Runner of Pern" (1998, in the anthology Legends, edited by Robert Silverberg ISBN 978-0-312-86787-4)
- The Skies of Pern (2001) ISBN 978-0-345-43469-2
- A Gift of Dragons (2002) ISBN 978-0-345-45635-9 – Pern short story collection
  - "The Smallest Dragonboy" (1973)
  - "The Girl Who Heard Dragons" (1986 novella)
  - "Runner of Pern" (1998)
  - "Ever the Twain" (2002)
- Dragon's Kin (2003) (Anne & Todd McCaffrey) ISBN 978-0-345-46200-8
- "Beyond Between" (2003, in the anthology Legends II, edited by Robert Silverberg ISBN 978-0-345-45644-1)
- Dragonsblood (2005) (Todd McCaffrey) ISBN 978-0-345-44124-9
- Dragon's Fire (2006) (Anne & Todd McCaffrey) ISBN 978-0-345-48028-6
- Dragon Harper (2007) (Anne & Todd McCaffrey) ISBN 978-0-345-48030-9
- Dragonheart (2008) (Todd McCaffrey) ISBN 978-0-582-36401-1
- Dragongirl (2010) (Todd McCaffrey) ISBN 978-0-593-05587-8
- Dragon's Time (June 2011) (Anne & Todd McCaffrey) ISBN 978-0-345-50089-2
- Sky Dragons (2012) (Anne & Todd McCaffrey) ISBN 978-0-593-06621-8
- Dragon's Code (2018) (Gigi McCaffrey) ISBN 978-1-101-96474-3
- After the Fall (in progress) (Note: Hans van der Boom reported in 2008/09 that McCaffrey at age 82 had warned its completion may not be possible: "with recurring health problems, it is very hard to find the energy ...". ("News". The Pern Museum & Archives. Hans van der Boom. Archived from the original on June 11, 2011. "Booknews: ... New solo Pern book by Anne put on hold!") • McCaffrey, Todd (15 May 2010). "Question from J.J." Todd McCaffrey. Pern Home. • Regarding collaboration with Todd, Anne McCaffrey said in 2011: "I still am a bit possessive when it comes to the futures of F'lar and Lessa. ["After the Fall"] ... Not only have I enjoyed helping Todd wrap up this very dramatic part of Pernese history, but my own creative juices have been flowing thick and furious: I've been writing up a storm on my own, too". "Letter to Readers", Anne McCaffrey, Dragon's Time, p. ix.)

=== The Brain & Brawn Ship series ===
The Brain & Brawn Ship series comprises seven novels. Only the first was written by Anne McCaffrey alone, a fix-up of five previously published stories.

The Ship books are set in the same universe as the Crystal Singer books, as Brainship–Brawn pairings were characters in the second and third volumes of that series.

- The Ship Who Sang (1969) (fix-up of stories from 1961, 1966, and 1969) ISBN 978-0-345-33431-2
- PartnerShip (1992) with Margaret Ball, ISBN 978-0-671-72109-1
- The Ship Who Searched (1992) with Mercedes Lackey, ISBN 978-0-671-72129-9
- The City Who Fought (1993) with S. M. Stirling, ISBN 978-0-671-87599-2
- The Ship Who Won (1994) with Jody Lynn Nye, ISBN 978-0-671-87657-9

This series also includes solo entries by Stirling and Nye:

- The Ship Errant (1996) by Jody Lynn Nye, ISBN 978-0-671-87854-2
- The Ship Avenged (1997) by S. M. Stirling, ISBN 978-0-671-87861-0

All but the first were issued in omnibus editions of two as Brain Ships (2003, McCaffrey, Ball & Lackey); The Ship Who Saved the Worlds (2003, McCaffrey & Nye); The City and the Ship (2004, McCaffrey & Stirling).

=== The Crystal series ===
The Crystal series, as catalogued by the Internet Speculative Fiction Database under the name Crystal Universe, comprises five novels published from 1982 and four earlier short stories that were a basis for the first book, The Crystal Singer. Three of the novels compose the Crystal trilogy, or Crystal Singer trilogy after the first of them.

- Crystal trilogy, or Crystal Singer trilogy
  - Crystal Singer (1982) ISBN 978-0-345-32786-4 (based on four stories published in 1974/75)
  - Killashandra (1986) ISBN 978-0-345-31600-4
  - Crystal Line (1992) ISBN 978-0-345-38491-1

Omnibus editions were published as The Crystal Singer Trilogy (1996) and The Crystal Singer Omnibus (1999).

ISFDB catalogues two other novels as "Crystal Universe" books.

- The Coelura (1983) ISBN 978-0-312-93042-4
- Nimisha's Ship (1998) ISBN 978-0-345-43425-8

=== Ireta ===
The Ireta series, as catalogued by ISFDB, comprises five novels, two Dinosaur Planets by Anne McCaffrey 1978 and 1984, and three Planet Pirates written with co-authors in the 1990s.

They share a fictional premise and some characters. The events of Dinosaur Planet overlap with the final chapters of The Death of Sleep, as does Dinosaur Planet Survivors with Sassinak; Generation Warriors continues and concludes the storylines of both series.

==== Dinosaur Planet series ====
When the Exploration and Evaluation Corps team reached the planet Ireta, dinosaurs were not what they expected to find.

- Dinosaur Planet (1978) ISBN 978-0-345-31995-1
- Dinosaur Planet Survivors (1984) ISBN 978-0-345-27246-1

Omnibus editions have been issued under the titles The Ireta Adventure (1985), The Dinosaur Planet Omnibus (2001), and The Mystery of Ireta (2004).

==== Planet Pirates trilogy ====
All is not well in the FSP, as the pirates attack the spacelanes. In this series, survivors on Ireta and survivors of space pirate attacks join forces.

- Sassinak (1990) with Elizabeth Moon, ISBN 978-0-671-69863-8
- The Death of Sleep (1990) with Jody Lynn Nye, ISBN 978-0-671-69884-3
- Generation Warriors (1991-02-01) with Elizabeth Moon, ISBN 978-0-671-72041-4

Omnibus edition: The Planet Pirates (1993).

== The Talents universe ==
The Talents Universe, as catalogued by the Internet Speculative Fiction Database, comprises two series. They share one fictional premise. Eight books, all by Anne McCaffrey alone, are rooted in her second story (1959) and three stories published in 1969.

=== The Talent series ===
- To Ride Pegasus (1973) (collection of stories from 1969 and 1973) ISBN 978-0-345-33603-3
- Pegasus in Flight (1990) ISBN 978-0-345-36897-3
- Pegasus in Space (2000) ISBN 978-0-345-43467-8

=== The Tower and Hive series ===
- The Rowan (1990) (partly based on the 1959 story "Lady in the Tower") ISBN 978-0-441-73576-1
- Damia (1991) (partly based on the 1969 short story "A Meeting of Minds") ISBN 978-0-441-13556-1
- Damia's Children (1993) ISBN 978-0-441-00007-4
- Lyon's Pride (1994) ISBN 978-0-441-00141-5
- The Tower and the Hive (1999) ISBN 978-0-441-00720-2

== Doona ==
- Decision at Doona (1969) ISBN 978-0-345-35377-1
- Crisis on Doona (1992) with Jody Lynn Nye, ISBN 978-0-441-23194-2
- Treaty at Doona (1994) with Jody Lynn Nye, ISBN 978-0-441-00089-0 (originally Treaty Planet)

Omnibus edition of the latter two: Doona (2004).

== Petaybee universe ==
The Petaybee universe comprises two trilogies by Anne McCaffrey and Elizabeth Ann Scarborough.

=== Powers trilogy ===
- Powers That Be (1993) with Elizabeth Ann Scarborough, ISBN 978-0-345-38173-6
- Power Lines (1994) with Elizabeth Ann Scarborough, ISBN 978-0-345-38780-6
- Power Play (1995) with Elizabeth Ann Scarborough, ISBN 978-0-345-38781-3

=== The Twins of Petaybee series ===
- Changelings (2005) with Elizabeth Ann Scarborough, ISBN 978-0-345-47002-7
- Maelstrom (2006) with Elizabeth Ann Scarborough, ISBN 978-0-345-47004-1
- Deluge (2008) with Elizabeth Ann Scarborough, ISBN 978-0-345-47006-5

== The Barque Cat series ==
This duology is a collaboration between Anne McCaffrey and Elizabeth Ann Scarborough that introduces a new universe with Barque Cats and their special telepathically linked humans.

- Catalyst (2010) with Elizabeth Ann Scarborough
- Catacombs (December 2010) with Elizabeth Ann Scarborough

== Freedom series ==
Freedom series or "Catteni Sequence" comprises one 1970 short story and four Freedom novels written from 1995 to 2002.

- Freedom's Landing (1995) ISBN 978-0-441-00338-9 (based on the 1970 short story "The Thorns of Barevi")
- Freedom's Choice (1996) ISBN 978-0-441-00531-4
- Freedom's Challenge (1998) ISBN 978-0-441-00625-0
- Freedom's Ransom (2002) ISBN 978-0-441-01020-2

== Acorna universe ==
The Acorna Universe series comprises ten novels published 1997 to 2007, seven sometimes called Acorna and three sometimes called Acorna's Children. The first two were written by Anne McCaffrey and Margaret Ball, the rest by McCaffrey and Elizabeth Ann Scarborough.

=== Acorna series ===
- Acorna: The Unicorn Girl (1997) with Margaret Ball, ISBN 978-0-06-105789-2
- Acorna's Quest (1998) with Margaret Ball, ISBN 978-0-06-105790-8
- Acorna's People (1999) with Elizabeth Ann Scarborough, ISBN 978-0-06-105983-4
- Acorna's World (2000) with Elizabeth Ann Scarborough, ISBN 978-0-06-105984-1
- Acorna's Search (2001) with Elizabeth Ann Scarborough, ISBN 978-0-380-81846-4
- Acorna's Rebels (2003) with Elizabeth Ann Scarborough, ISBN 978-0-380-81847-1
- Acorna's Triumph (2004) with Elizabeth Ann Scarborough, ISBN 978-0-380-81848-8

=== Acorna's Children series ===
- First Warning (2005) with Elizabeth Ann Scarborough, ISBN 978-0-06-052539-2
- Second Wave (2006) with Elizabeth Ann Scarborough, ISBN 978-0-06-052540-8
- Third Watch (2007) with Elizabeth Ann Scarborough, ISBN 978-0-06-052541-5

== Short story collections ==
- Get Off the Unicorn (1977) ISBN 978-0-441-00338-9
- The Girl Who Heard Dragons (1994) (contains one Pern story by the same name) ISBN 978-0-8125-1099-7

== Romances ==
- The Mark of Merlin (1971) ISBN 978-1-58715-493-5
- Ring of Fear (1971) ISBN 978-1-58715-016-6
- The Kilternan Legacy (1975) ISBN 978-1-58715-793-6
- Stitch in Snow (1985) ISBN 978-0-8125-8562-9
- The Year of the Lucy (1986) ISBN 978-0-8125-8565-0
- The Lady (1987) ISBN 978-0-345-35674-1 (also published as The Carradyne Touch)

Three Women contains the first three listed in an omnibus edition.

== Children's books ==
- An Exchange of Gifts (1995) ISBN 978-1-880448-48-9
- No One Noticed the Cat (1996) ISBN 978-0-8439-5903-1
- If Wishes Were Horses (1998) ISBN 978-0-8439-5912-3
- Black Horses for the King (1998) ISBN 978-0-15-206378-8 – Arthurian historical novel

== Anthologies ==
- Alchemy and Academe (1970)
- Space Opera (1996) with Elizabeth Ann Scarborough, ISBN 978-0886777142

== Nonfiction ==
=== Cookbooks ===
- Cooking Out of This World (1973), edited by A.M.; revised in 1992, ISBN 978-1-880448-13-7
- Serve it Forth: Cooking with Anne McCaffrey (1996), edited with John Gregory Betancourt, ISBN 978-0-446-67161-3

=== Dragons ===
- A Diversity of Dragons (1997), by A.M. and Richard Woods, illustrated by John Howe, Atheneum Books, ISBN 978-0-06-105531-7 – ISFDB says: "Cataloged as fiction by the Library of Congress even though it's part non-fiction and part art book".
