= The Tower and the Hive =

1999 science fiction novel by Anne McCaffrey

- First edition (published by Ace Books), cover art by Duane O. Myers
- Author: Anne McCaffrey
- Language: English
- Publication date: 1999

The Tower and the Hive is a 1999 science fiction novel by American writer Anne McCaffrey, the concluding volume of a five-book series also referred to as The Tower and Hive series.

== Premise ==
Human Talents, who allied with the Mrdini, an alien race who have been under attack by the insectoid Hive species for 200 years, discover a solution to curtail Hivers' explosive population expansions without having to wipe out the species as a whole, a solution which both Alliance species object to.

At the same time a similar solution is discovered to help the Mrdini curtail their own birthrate, now that they no longer have to sacrifice huge numbers of soldiers in battle to save their worlds from Hiver attacks.

The book was published on May 1, 1999, by Ace Books in U.S.

== "The Tower and the Hive" series ==
Beginning with The Rowan, the series follows the lives and careers of the Gwyn-Raven-Lyon dynasty of Talents in the distant future:

1. The Rowan
2. Damia
3. Damia's Children
4. Lyon's Pride
5. The Tower and the Hive

To Ride Pegasus, Pegasus in Flight, and Pegasus in Space also deal with the early development of the Talents.

== Reception ==
Kirkus Reviews called the series and a novel a "cuddly" family/romance/alien-contact saga with useful ideas, but considered the names of many characters in the series to be "silly".

Publishers Weekly said that the novel lacks the profound imagination in SF genre, but it also avoids the kill-the-bugs outlook seen in other SF titles such as Starship Troopers. They noted that readers looking for intelligent, heroic adventure will find in this novel, and that Rowan fans will be pleased with this novel as the satisfying conclusion of a series.
