= To Ride Pegasus =

1973 collection of science fiction stories by Anne McCaffrey

- First edition
- Author: Anne McCaffrey
- Cover artist: Gene Szafran
- Language: English
- Series: Talents Universe
- Genre: Science fiction
- Publisher: Ballantine Books
- Publication date: August 1973
- Publication place: United States
- Media type: Print (paperback)
- Pages: 243 pp
- ISBN: 0-345-23417-0
- OCLC: 440120697
- Followed by: Pegasus in Flight

To Ride Pegasus is a collection of four science fiction stories by American writer Anne McCaffrey, published by Ballantine Books in 1973 and later under its Del Rey imprint. "To Ride Pegasus" is also the title of the novella, the first of the four stories that was original to the collection.

To Ride Pegasus originates the fictional premise of the Talents universe, the setting for seven novels published 1990 to 2000: two more Pegasus books and five Tower and Hive books. All eight books feature so-called Talents, people with psionic powers such as empathy, telepathy, teleportation, telekinesis, clairvoyance, precognition, and the ability to find what is lost ('finders').

Pegasus is a symbol for Talent, early adopted by Henry Darrow: "You'd see a lot from the back of a winged horse ..." (p. 11). "When you ride the winged horse, you can't dismount. ... We'll find our bridle, I think, with time and training and more practice at riding".

== Novella ==
The novella "To Ride Pegasus" is a prequel to the three previously published stories. It explains the fortunate scientific discovery of psionic powers and the earliest establishment of the Talents in human society, in Greater New York late during the 20th century (in the future depicted, the conurbation spreading from New Jersey to Manhattan gets named "Jerhattan"). The 'precog' Henry Darrow does not avoid his own foreseen automobile accident. In the hospital, a talented nurse notices his unusual electroencephalograph (EEG) recordings and they complete the discovery together (as well as fall in love and get married). Darrow recognizes the crucial breakthrough:

Now we can prove parapsychic powers exist and who has them. We can discredit the charlatans and clowns who've given the rest of us a bad name. The real Talents will be registered with the Center and we'll have graphs to prove they've had valid Incidents. The Center will supply them with the specialized jobs that utilize their Talents.

Darrow turns from high-price consultation about the future (astrology) to his lifework, setting the Talents surely on the way to a personally respected, legally protected, and highly paid status. Important early tasks are demonstration of scientific validity and detectability, private fund-raising, and creation of a coordinating and protective institution.

Darrow comes to direct the nonprofit North American Center for Parapsychic Talents. In his lifetime the Center identifies many Talents and begins to train them and place them in appropriate jobs. It secures a sheltered but conveniently located headquarters: a research, public relations, and residential campus. Darrow recognizes his successor as Director. He envisions crucial steps in the professionalization of Talents but their achievement is left to the future.

== Collection ==
- "To Ride Pegasus", original to the collection (August 1973)
- "A Womanly Talent", Analog, February 1969
- "Apple", Crime Prevention in the 30th Century, ed. Hans Stefan Santesson, Walker & Co., 1969
- "A Bridle for Pegasus", Analog, July 1973

The three older stories feature the center and its community of resident Talents, under Darrow's successor Daffyd op Owen. Each one features particular Talents, active or latent, within or without the community, but the big picture is the continuing establishment of Talents in society by internal reform, social education, and legislation. Owen, his staff, and public officials are important players and the stories' emphasis is about recruitment, training, registration, public education, professional ethics and liability.

- "A Womanly Talent", Analog, February 1969. The campaign to win professional immunity for Talents is underway with a comprehensive Bill under consideration by a committee of the US Senate. The story at the Center features a young husband and wife who soon win permission to reproduce. Lajos is a precog specialist in fires; he is employed privately by the insurance industry and works with the center to prevent or mitigate public disasters. Ruth's talent is barely detectable and unknown in nature.
- "Apple", Crime Prevention in the 30th Century, edited by Hans Stefan Santesson, Walker & Co., 1969. The Bill providing comprehensive legal protection for Talents is now expected to pass in a few weeks. The story at the Center concerns a theft by teleportation from a Manhattan department store window, which is undeniably the work of some unknown Talent. Relations between the Center and Law Enforcement are strained at best and a public relations disaster may be incipient.
- "A Bridle for Pegasus", Analog, July 1973. Ethnic tension is high in Greater New York and a summer of strife is feared. The story at the Center concerns another wild Talent, a musical performer unaware of her ability to manipulate the emotions of a crowd. She might be registered and trained by the center, or recruited by the leader of one ethnic faction, or even kidnapped.

== Series ==
During the 1990s McCaffrey made To Ride Pegasus the first book in a series that is otherwise set after greater psionic talents have been discovered or developed and their employment has become vital. Pegasus in Flight (1990) and its sequel Pegasus in Space (2000) show how the Talents enabled human society to extend beyond planet Earth, primarily by assisting space transportation and communication. The Rowan (1990) takes up the Talents and the author's second published story, "The Lady in the Tower" (1959), to initiate the Tower and Hive subseries. Essentially, the title character, the Rowan, is both a Talent and the lady in the tower. The books feature three generations of the most powerful Talents when human society is far-flung in the galaxy and interacts with alien interstellar species.

The Internet Speculative Fiction Database catalogues "The Talents Universe" in two subseries.

Talents

- To Ride Pegasus (1973) ISBN 0-345-33603-8 — collection of stories from 1969 and 1973
- Pegasus in Flight (1990) ISBN 0-345-36897-5
- Pegasus in Space (2000) ISBN 0-345-43467-6

Tower and Hive

"The Lady in the Tower", The Magazine of Fantasy & Science Fiction, April 1959
"A Meeting of Minds", The Magazine of Fantasy & Science Fiction, January 1969

- The Rowan (1990) ISBN 0-441-73576-2 — partly based on the 1959 short story "Lady"
- Damia (1991) ISBN 0-441-13556-0 – partly based on the 1969 short story "Meeting"
- Damia's Children (1993) ISBN 0-441-00007-X
- Lyon's Pride (1994) ISBN 0-441-00141-6
- The Tower and the Hive (1999) ISBN 0-441-00720-1
