= Acorna's Triumph =

2004 novel by Anne McCaffrey

- First edition
- Author: Anne McCaffrey and Elizabeth Ann Scarborough
- Cover artist: John Ellis
- Language: English
- Series: Acorna Universe
- Publisher: Harper
- Publication date: 2004
- Pages: 352 (paperback)
- ISBN: 0-3808-1848-5 (paperback)
- Preceded by: Acorna's Rebels
- Followed by: First Warning

Acorna's Triumph is a 2004 science fantasy novel by American writers Anne McCaffrey and Elizabeth Ann Scarborough. It is the seventh book in the Acorna Universe series, which McCaffrey and Margaret Ball initiated in Acorna: The Unicorn Girl (1997). Triumph completed Acorna's biography, which is sometimes called the Acorna series. It was followed by First Warning, sometimes called the first book of the Acorna's Children trilogy.

== Plot synopsis ==
Acorna's lifemate, Aari, has returned home, and the two may together finish rebuilding their home world. Yet the Aari that has returned from his time travels is different from the one who left, to the point that he almost does not remember Acorna or the love that the two shared together. During the confusion while Acorna shifts her attention to stopping a violent criminal from harming innocents, the wicked Khleevi return to retake the planet and destroy the Linyaari and conquer their world. It takes all of Acorna's will to rescue the Aari she loves and put a stop to the Khleevi menace.
