= First Warning (novel) =

2005 novel by Anne McCaffrey

- First edition (published by Eos), cover art by Chris McGrath
- Author: Anne McCaffrey and Elizabeth Ann Scarborough
- Series: Acorna Universe
- Genre: Science fantasy
- Publisher: Eos
- ISBN: 978-0-06-052538-5
- Preceded by: Acorna's Triumph
- Followed by: Second Wave

First Warning (2005) is a science fantasy novel by American writers Anne McCaffrey and Elizabeth Ann Scarborough. It is the first book in the Acorna's Children trilogy, which is part of the Acorna Universe series that McCaffrey and Margaret Ball initiated with Acorna: The Unicorn Girl (1997).

First Warning chronicles the adventures of Khorii, the daughter of Acorna and Aari, who were the main characters in the earlier books. It is a coming-of-age story in a sense, and as Khorii ages she learns to use the telepathic powers that are characteristic of all her people, the Linyaari.
