= Killashandra =

Killashandra may refer to:

- Killeshandra, a town in County Cavan, Ireland
  - Killashandra railway station, a disused railway station in County Cavan
- Killashandra Ree, a character in the novel Crystal Singer by Anne McCaffrey
- Killashandra (novel), a 1986 novel by Anne McCaffrey
