= Acorna's Search =

2001 novel by Anne McCaffrey

- First edition
- Author: Anne McCaffrey and Elizabeth Ann Scarborough
- Cover artist: John Ellis
- Language: English
- Series: Acorna Universe
- Genre: Science fantasy
- Publisher: HarperTorch
- Publication date: 2001
- Publication place: United States
- Media type: Print (hardback & paperback)
- Pages: 304
- ISBN: 978-0-380-81846-4
- OCLC: 51197735
- Preceded by: Acorna's World
- Followed by: Acorna's Rebels

Acorna's Search (2001) is a science fantasy novel by American writers Anne McCaffrey and Elizabeth Ann Scarborough. It is the fifth book in the Acorna Universe series, which was initiated by McCaffrey and Margaret Ball in Acorna: The Unicorn Girl (1997). Search was preceded by Acorna's World and followed by Acorna's Rebels.

== Plot summary ==
Acorna's homeworld has been devastated by a brutal attack from the Khleevi, yet the Linyaari—the gentle, spiritual race of the unicorn girl—survive. As efforts begin to heal and restore the planet's natural beauty, her friends and colleagues, including her beloved Aari, mysteriously disappear. Acorna's search for answers leads her to a revelation beneath her world and into the depths of space, uncovering the origins of everything.
