= Acorna's Rebels =

2003 novel by Anne McCaffrey

- First edition
- Author: Anne McCaffrey and Elizabeth Ann Scarborough
- Cover artist: John Ellis
- Language: English
- Series: Acorna Universe
- Publisher: Eos
- Publication date: 2003
- Pages: 384 (paperback)
- ISBN: 0-380-81847-7 (paperback)
- Preceded by: Acorna's Search
- Followed by: Acorna's Triumph

Acorna's Rebels (2003) is a science fantasy novel by American writers Anne McCaffrey and Elizabeth Ann Scarborough. It is the sixth book in the Acorna Universe series, which was initiated by McCaffrey and Margaret Ball in Acorna: The Unicorn Girl (1997). Rebels was preceded by Acorna's Search and followed by Acorna's Triumph, the seventh and last in Acorna series.

== Plot ==
Acorna, a member of the unicorn-like Linyaari race, has finally found her people. Once conquered, their world scoured flat, they are now using a combination of holographics and time travel to recreate the great civilization they once had. In one of these time traveling trips, her life-mate, Aari, has been lost. The race ends up getting their world back the way it was before it got conquered.

Acorna and her friends crash their spaceship on the prohibited planet of Makahomia. Acorna's space-faring companion, Roadkill (RK), is actually one of the mysterious Makahomian Temple Cats.

Discovering that the cats are dying of a disease, Acorna rushes to save them and foil the plot of their enemies. She also unearths clues that may help her locate Aari.
