= Acorna's World =

2000 novel by Anne McCaffrey

- First edition
- Author: Anne McCaffrey and Elizabeth Ann Scarborough
- Cover artist: John Ellis
- Language: English
- Series: Acorna Universe
- Genre: Fantasy, science fiction
- Publication place: United States
- Media type: Print (paperback)
- Preceded by: Acorna's People
- Followed by: Acorna's Search

Acorna's World (2000) is a science fantasy novel by American writers Anne McCaffrey and Elizabeth Ann Scarborough. It is the fourth book in the Acorna Universe series, which was initiated by McCaffrey and Margaret Ball in Acorna: The Unicorn Girl (1997). World was preceded by Acorna's People and followed by Acorna's Search.

== Plot summary ==
Having come to understand her Linyaari past, Acorna has become a member of the crew of the Condor, a salvage ship. The crew consists of the mildly eccentric Captain Becker, the ship's feline first mate RK (otherwise known as Roadkill), and Aari, a Linyaari who is still scarred physically and emotionally from his capture and subsequent torture by the Khleevi. While searching space for salvage, they come across the wreck of a ship with information indicating that the Khleevi are on the move in that sector of space, and may come to the Linyaari homeworld of Narhii-Viliinyar before long. Acorna and her friends must now warn their people and find a way to stop the oncoming Khleevi horde.
