= Acorna's People =

1999 novel by Anne McCaffrey

- First edition
- Author: Anne McCaffrey and Elizabeth Ann Scarborough
- Cover artist: John Ellis
- Language: English
- Series: Acorna Universe
- Genre: Fantasy, science fiction
- Publisher: HarperCollins
- Publication date: July 1999
- Publication place: United States
- Media type: Print (paperback)
- Pages: 320
- ISBN: 0-06-105094-6
- OCLC: 40762571
- Dewey Decimal: 813/.54 21
- LC Class: PS3563.A255 A646 1999
- Preceded by: Acorna's Quest
- Followed by: Acorna's World

Acorna's People (1999) is a science fantasy novel by American writers Anne McCaffrey and Elizabeth Ann Scarborough. It is the third book in the Acorna Universe series, which was initiated by McCaffrey and Margaret Ball in Acorna: The Unicorn Girl (1997); McCaffrey and Scarborough have extended the series through ten books as of 2011.

== Synopsis ==
In the book, Acorna has finally been reunited with her people - the Linyaari - and has travelled to the new homeworld of her people Narhii, Vhiliinyar to learn about her lost culture, but she is distinctly different from her people due to her unusual upbringing, and most are not accepting of her. The only people who really befriend her are her aunt, Neeva and her shipmates, and the oldest Linyaari Grandam Naadiina, as well as the young girl named Maati. All of her friends on the ship Balakiire are called away on Acorna's first day on her planet, to investigate the loss of communication with certain off-world Linyaari colonies. This loss of communication soon spreads, and more ships are launched, but all join the missing and soon the fate of her spacefaring friends is placed in Acorna's hands.
