= Mrdini =

The Mrdini are a fictional extraterrestrial species from the Rowan/Talent series by Anne McCaffrey. They first appear in the novel Damia.

The Mrdini, or 'Dinis, are described as looking somewhat like bipedal weasels with one eye. They grow continuously throughout life, and size—along with the number of letters in their name—is an indicator of status in Mrdini culture. For instance, a young 'Dini would have three letters in its name and be about the size of a child, whereas High Councillor Gktmglnt, co-president of the Human-Mrdini Alliance High Council, had more than twice the number of letters and was large enough to tower over most humans. They originate from a planet called Clarf, a world with very bright sunlight and a warmer average climate than Earth. The Mrdini, at the time of first contact with humans, had already colonized several star systems using slower-than-light travel; when they finally met humans, they were given their own Prime Tower (in this series, some humans called Prime Talents, using generators in specialized facilities called Towers, have the ability to psychically teleport matter over interstellar distances).

The Mrdini culture has been shaped by generations of warfare with the rapacious colonizers called the Hivers. The only way they had to destroy the massive, heavily defended Hiver ships was to send in waves of kamikaze ships, in hopes that one would get through. This has led to a somewhat fatalistic warrior ethos, with death in battle seen as a way to win honor for one's "color" (clan).

The 'Dinis have some difficulty in communicating with humans, an effort not made any easier by the fact that the Mrdini language consists entirely of consonants. This problem is addressed by two methods in the series. The first is 'Dini Dreaming, a means of literally sharing images with others in their dreams. The telepathic Talents among humanity are particularly sensitive to these dream-messages, but they are limited to conveying only simple messages. The other, long-term answer to mutual misunderstanding is to have a number of human and 'Dini children raised together, to learn each other's ways and languages right from the start. The novel Damia's Children describes a family, the Raven-Lyons, who were one of the first to implement this program.

The Mrdini biology and reproductive system has significant differences from that of humans. They are seemingly genderless, or at least consider gender pronouns to be in bad taste. Once per year, they enter a mass hibernation for two months. When they come out of this state, there are young 'Dinis among them. It is not until midway in the second to last book of the series, Lyon's Pride, that human scientists are allowed inside a Hibernatorium to discover how Mrdini reproduction works. Essentially, pheromones released during hibernation cause them to split genetic material and even memories, allowing their young to be born with some knowledge already in place. This unique quirk of their biology even allows individual Mrdini to be "recreated" if they die, by finding the original parent and isolating them during hibernation, and the same combination of genes and memories takes place. The "re-made" Mrdini will lack the recent life experience of the original, but will have essentially the same personality.

The fact that Mrdini reproduce with every hibernation, however, has posed tremendous problems for them in the past. Their starships, for instance, could not support an expanding population; so excess births had to go "on the line", a Mrdini euphemism for cannibalism. It was not until humans, with their system of teleportation, appeared to them, that the Mrdini were able to give these unwanted children the chance to live.

Eventually, humans are able to work out a means of limiting Mrdini conception through manipulating their pheromones, allowing them to control their population growth for the first time in Mrdini history.
