= Emily Thiede =

American writer

- Education: University of Virginia
- Occupation: novelist
- Children: 2
- Writing career
- Language: English
- Genre: young adult fiction
- Notable work: This Vicious Grace
- Website: www.ekthiede.com

Emily Thiede is an American author of young adult fiction, best known for her The Last Finestra series.

== Early life ==
Thiede moved to Virginia as a high schooler when her father took a job at the University of Virginia.

As a child, she read fantasy and sci-fi anthologies from her father's collection. The first book she remembers reading is Dragonsong by Anne McCaffrey.

She studied at the University of Virginia, and says during her studies there, she was always fascinated by researching human interaction and human touch, which later influences her to write her debut book about a character who cannot touch anyone without being afraid of causing harm.

Before becoming an author, Thiede worked as a teacher.

After her first child was born, she developed an interest in books again. She didn't attempt to write a novel until after her second child was born, challenged by her mother to write a novel for National Novel Writing Month. The book that made her want to start writing is This Savage Song by V.E. Schwab. She took writing classes at Writer's House in Charlottesville.

== Personal life ==
Thiede has ADHD, which she describes a factor in wanting to become a writer since she's prone to daydreaming.

She fosters two rescue cats, and has two daughters. Thiede now lives in Charlottesville.

== The Last Finestra ==
The first book, This Vicious Grace, is about a girl that gets chosen by the gods to save the worlds, but happens to accidentally kill her magical suitors, becoming an outcast. B&N Reads named it one of their most anticipated YA books for November /December 2022. It also received a starred review from Kirkus Reviews.

Thiede says she's always enjoyed the contrast between X Men's Rogue and Wolverine, and cites that as one of her inspirations for the second novel in the series, This Cursed Light.
