= Acorna's Quest =

1998 novel by Anne McCaffrey

- Original cover of Acorna's Quest
- Author: Anne McCaffrey and Margaret Ball
- Cover artist: John Ellis
- Language: English
- Series: Acorna Universe
- Genre: Science fiction
- Publisher: Eos
- Publication date: 1998
- Publication place: United States
- Media type: Print (hardback & paperback)
- Pages: 416
- ISBN: 0-06-105790-8
- OCLC: 41474006
- Preceded by: Acorna: The Unicorn Girl
- Followed by: Acorna's People

Acorna's Quest (1998) is a science fantasy novel by American writers Anne McCaffrey and Margaret Ball. It is the sequel to Acorna: The Unicorn Girl and is the second book in the Acorna Universe series. McCaffrey and Elizabeth Ann Scarborough continued the series beginning with Acorna's People (1999).
