= The Unicorn Creed =

- Author: Elizabeth Ann Scarborough
- Language: English
- Publication date: 1983

The Unicorn Creed is a 1983 novel written by Elizabeth Ann Scarborough.

== Plot summary ==
The Unicorn Creed is a novel in which hearthwitch Maggie is searching for her sister, and is unexpectedly and against her will made a princess by the king, so she embarks on a quest to return the unwanted crown alongside Colin and the unicorn Moonshine who has attached himself to her. Along the way, they uncover a sinister plot to capture unicorns, creatures vital to the land's well-being. Moonshine must also deepen his understanding of the Unicorn Creed, presented in limerick form, to navigate moral dilemmas.

== Reception ==
David Dunham reviewed The Unicorn Creed for Different Worlds magazine and stated that "It appears as if Ms. Scarborough has fallen into a rut. There are sertainly less entertaining ruts for a writer to be stuck in, but I can only recommend Unicorn Creed if you enjoyed Song Of Sorcery."

== Reviews ==
- Review by Ken St. Andre (1983) in Sorcerer's Apprentice, Issue 16
- Review by Phyllis McDonald (1987) in Interzone, Winter 1987, (1987)
