= The Harper Hall Trilogy =

Science fiction novel series by Anne McCaffrey

The Harper Hall of Pern
- First omnibus edition
- Author: Anne McCaffrey
- Cover artist: Victoria Poyser
- Language: English
- Series: Dragonriders of Pern
- Genre: Science fiction and young adult fiction omnibus
- Publisher: Doubleday SFBC
- Publication date: July 1984
- Publication place: United States
- Media type: Print (hardcover)
- Pages: 500 pp (first)
- ISBN: 1-56865-017-5 (1997 second edition)

The Harper Hall trilogy is a series of three science fiction novels by the American-Irish author Anne McCaffrey. They are part of the Dragonriders of Pern series as it is known today, 26 books by Anne or her son Todd McCaffrey or daughter Gigi McCaffrey as of 2018. (Note: The books are distinct: they exclude omnibus editions and the separate publications as the books of the longest works are later collected or incorporated.) They were published by Atheneum Books in 1976, 1977, and 1979, alongside the Dragonriders of Pern series. Omnibus editions of the two trilogies were published by the Doubleday Science Fiction Book Club in 1978 and 1984, titled The Dragonriders of Pern and The Harper Hall of Pern respectively.

Harper Hall's target was young adults in contrast to the general audience for fantasy and science fiction. Indeed, editor Jean E. Karl, who had established the children's and science fiction imprints at Atheneum Books, hoped to attract more female readers to science fiction and solicited "a story for young women in a different part of Pern". McCaffrey delivered Dragonsong and they contracted for a sequel before it was out.

== Books ==
- Dragonsong (1976)
- Dragonsinger (1977)
- Dragondrums (1979)

The three books were subtitled "Volume One of The Harper Hall Trilogy", "Volume Two ...", and "Volume Three ..." on the front covers of the first Bantam Spectra edition, early 1986.

== Synopses ==
Dragonsong and Dragonsinger feature 15-year-old Menolly, a girl with great musical talent raised in an isolated sea-hold (akin to a fishing village) where composition is no part of a girl's future. Dragonsong ends with her invitation to the main craft-hall of the harpers. Dragonsinger covers her brief apprenticeship there, ending with her promotion to journeyman.

Dragondrums focuses on Piemur, a secondary character in Dragonsinger as a boy soprano, and one apprentice who made Menolly feel welcome. His voice changes and he needs a new occupation, perhaps at the communication drums.

== Awards ==
The American Library Association in 1999 cited the two early Pern trilogies (Dragonriders and Harper Hall), along with The Ship Who Sang, when McCaffrey received the annual Margaret A. Edwards Award for her "lifetime contribution in writing for teens".
