= Nerilka's Story & The Coelura =

Novel collection

Nerilka's Story & The Coelura is a collection by Anne McCaffrey published in 1987.

== Plot summary ==
Nerilka's Story & The Coelura is composed of two short novels, Nerilka and The Coelura.

== Reception ==
Wendy Graham reviewed Nerilka's Story & The Coelura for Adventurer magazine and stated that "it is par for the course for me that I loved Nerilka, but I confess I wasn't that taken with The Coelura, the second story, which is set in a new part of Anne's other universe, that of the FSP. It is one of those stories which will add weight to those who call her the Barbara Cartland of Science Fiction".

Dave Langford reviewed Nerilka's Story & The Coelura for White Dwarf #90, and stated that "there's the seed of something interesting here, but the short format allows only a standard candyfloss ending [...] and a nice double wedding to finish. Hear those violins?"

== Reviews ==
- Review by Tom Easton (1986) in Analog Science Fiction and Fact, December 1986
- Review by Denise Gorse (1987) in Vector #137
