= Crystal Singer series =

Science fiction novel series by Anne McCaffrey

Crystal Singer is a series of science fiction novels by American writer Anne McCaffrey.

The series is set on the planet Ballybran which is under a permanent biohazard travel restriction. Ballybran is home to one of the FSP's wealthiest, yet most reclusive organizations, called the Heptite Guild. Source of invaluable crystals vital to various industries, the Heptite Guild is known to require absolute, perfect pitch in hearing and voice for all applicants, especially those seeking to mine crystal by song.

The first book in the series, Crystal Singer, was published in 1982, though it was initially published in four parts in the anthologies Continuum 1, 2, 3, & 4, edited by Roger Elwood. The second and third books, Killashandra (1986) and Crystal Line (1992), include a Brainship from McCaffery's Ship series, though the ships do not play a major role in any novel. The Brainship in Killashandra is not the same as in Crystal Line, and the latter novel also includes a reference to the first Brainship in the original series (Helva), noting that her whereabouts were still unknown at the point of reference in the Crystal Singer timeline.

Crystal Singer placed seventh for the 1983 annual Locus Award for Best Science Fiction Novel, voted by Locus readers. It was one of six finalists for the Balrog Award in the novel class.

== Books ==
- Crystal Singer (1982) ISBN 0-345-32786-1
- Killashandra (1986) ISBN 0-345-31600-2
- Crystal Line (1992) ISBN 0-345-38491-1
