= Bronwyn's Bane =

Elizabeth Ann Scarborough's novel

Bronwyn's Bane is a fantasy novel by American writer Elizabeth Ann Scarborough, published in 1983.

== Plot summary ==
Bronwyn's Bane is a novel in which a princess goes on a quest after she has been cursed to be incapable of telling the truth.

== Reception ==
Dave Langford reviewed Bronwyn's Bane for White Dwarf #98, and stated that "Bronwyn just peters out, with the curse going away for no definite reason and the heroine contracting her putative first child into twenty years of slavery -- a sequel hook, no doubt, but a highly unsatisfactory note on which to end a novel."

== Reviews ==
- Review by Tom Easton (1984) in Analog Science Fiction/Science Fact, February 1984
- Review by Paul McGuire (1984) in Science Fiction Review, Summer 1984
- Review by Michael R. Collings (1984) in Fantasy Review, May 1984
