= The Healer's War =

1988 novel by Elizabeth Ann Scarborough

- First edition (publ. Doubleday); Cover by Braldt Bralds
- Author: Elizabeth Ann Scarborough
- Language: English
- Publisher: Doubleday
- Publication date: 1988
- ISBN: 0-385-24828-8 (first edition, hardcover)
- Dewey Decimal: 813.54
- LC Class: PS3569.C324 H4

The Healer's War is a 1988 science fiction novel by American writer Elizabeth Ann Scarborough. It won the Nebula Award for Best Novel in 1989. The story is about a military nurse during the Vietnam War.

== Plot ==
The plot revolves around Lt. Kitty McCulley, a Military Nurse during the Vietnam War.

Kitty is transferred from one area of the military hospital after accidentally killing a child, by giving her an overdose. Her new area is the orthopedics wing, where there is a pleasant staff, and patients who are awake and able to talk. The hospital takes care of both soldiers and Vietnamese citizens.

The first half of the book is spent telling the story of Kitty and her time treating and becoming friends with patients, her love life (and what it is like being one of a few women on a military base), and the contrast between Vietnam and America.

Kitty meets a revered Vietnamese holy man, Xe, who is one of her patients that needs surgery. No jewelry is allowed to be worn during surgery, and with a lot of effort and help from other patients, she convinces him to take off the necklace with the amulet. However, he insists that she wear it. Kitty starts to see auras around herself and others, and initially brushes it off as feeling sick. She returns it to Xe after surgery. Kitty later learns, from a GI following Xe around that he is a revered healer.

Over time, various people seem to be doing better, but things take a turn for the worse when a new surgeon takes over the orthopedics ward.

The surgeon hates everyone from Vietnam, because his brother was killed in action. His brother's sacrifice motivated him to join the military. He does everything possible to transfer/ release all of the Vietnamese patients. In most cases, this is a death sentence, as the American hospital has the resources to keep a sanitary environment.

When Xe dies, he gives kitty his amulet.

One boy, who had lost a leg, was almost healed, but was going to be discharged, so Kitty worked with her lover, Tony, a pilot, to move him to a separate hospital without permission.

The helicopter is shot out from the sky and goes down over a jungle.

Kitty's amulet allows her to see auras, which allow them to avoid the Vietcong.

From there, they spend a decent amount of the book meeting a bunch of characters. William, an American GI who is the only survivor of his squad teams up with them, only to start attacking them when he unknowingly has PTSD night terrors. Later, he gets into a mode where he is looking for Vietcong and almost kills them. Kitty is able to navigate them away safely, because she can see when he has a dangerous aura.

They end up in a Vietnam village, where Kitty helps fight off a snake that is killing villagers. She is able to heal a woman who was bitten by the venomous snake using the amulet. Later, the village brings her more people to help save, and Kitty is able to connect using other people to use their collective energy to heal.

During this time, Kitty starts to dream that she is some of the people who had touched the amulet/ helped her heal others, building intense bonds. She is able to experience/ feel/ understand them, even with language barriers.

She meets a villagers who were raped by GI's, and sees a fuller picture of how Vietnamese villages live in a Catch-22 of being threatened/ bombed by either the Vietcong or the Americans based on their actions, and are caught in the middle.

The Vietcong overtake the village and the villagers are able to convince the captain to take Kitty hostage but keep her safe. She becomes separated from her child companion and hopes for a better life for him.

Kitty is then faced with seeing the decent side of the Vietcong, who take care of her. Soon, though, she experiences the same people murdering a family. She helps heal a Vietcong soldier who is wounded, but his commander later shoots him because he would slow them down.

Kitty talks with the commander, who touched the amulet and is now connected to her - he points out how the amulet is dangerous in the hands of any military and will be abused. He doesn't want to let her heal villagers, so she doesn't become a folk hero, but also how the US military will exploit her amulet powers if they learn as well.

When Kitty is rescued, the Americans don't believe her story and she is exposed to inhumane / evil sides of the US military.

She gets transferred to a military hospital. While there, it isn't clear if she's going to be Court marshaled for going AWOL or sent back home. She gets awarded with a silver star, but feels ashamed; this was how a patient she took care of in the hospital earlier in the book acted toward receiving a medal. Eventually kitty is able to safely make it back home to America.

The last part of the story is Kitty trying to reintegrate.

She has been changed by war and finds her life to be meaningless. The guy she liked and wrote to, got a girlfriend, whom he never mentioned, and then she finds a stack of her unopened letters from him.

She tries to be a nurse, but she's getting her work done early because she's used to being interrupted to help new wounded patients coming in.

The people she is meeting in hospitals are all depressed. She starts crashing her cars as she is out of it.

At a low point, she is about to kill herself when she wishes that someone cared enough about her to have taken her to Disneyland. She then decides to take herself to Disneyland.

At the airport in LA, Kitty gets distracted by groups of frightened Vietnamese refugees. She spends the week coming to the airport everyday to look through the new arrivals, hoping to see her friends/ patients.

Kitty ends up finding new meaning to her life, and the book ends with her planning to start helping refugees from Vietnam.
