= Crystal Singer =

1982 novel by Anne McCaffrey

The Crystal Singer
- First edition
- Author: Anne McCaffrey
- Cover artist: Rob Burt (first); and others
- Language: English
- Series: Crystal Singer
- Genre: Young adult science fiction
- Publisher: Severn House Publishers
- Publication date: February 1982
- Publication place: United Kingdom
- Media type: Print (hardback & paperback)
- Pages: 301
- ISBN: 978-0-727-82022-8
- OCLC: 13050511
- LC Class: CPB Box no. 1723 vol. 20 (Copyright Paperback Collection)
- Followed by: Killashandra

The Crystal Singer, or Crystal Singer in the U.S., is a young adult, science fiction novel by American writer Anne McCaffrey, first published by Severn House in 1982. It features the transition by Killashandra Ree, a young woman who has failed as an operatic soloist, to the occupation of "crystal singer" on the fictional planet Ballybran. The novel is based on short stories written in 1974 and is the first book of Crystal universe series.

Alternatively, Crystal Singer is a trilogy completed in 1992 and named for its first book.

Doubleday and Del Rey Books published U.S. book club and paperback editions within a few months of the first edition in 1982. Other editions in French, Polish, and Hebrew languages were published in the 1990s.

== Origins ==
While a schoolgirl, Anne McCaffrey enjoyed one year of piano lessons purchased by her aunt. Later she studied voice for nine years, performed in the first music circus in 1949, once directed a play, and worked for a record label, Liberty Music Shop. DuPont transferred her husband temporarily to Düsseldorf, Germany, in 1962/63, where Anne resumed vocal training but suffered a crisis when she was informed that a flaw in her voice would limit her in that avocation. Regarding that experience, including some emotional trauma, her fictional character Killashandra Ree is partly autobiographical.

McCaffrey divorced her husband in August 1970 and emigrated to the vicinity of Dublin, Ireland, in September with her second Dragonriders of Pern book nearly finished and a contract for the third. The White Dragon would complete her "original trilogy" with Ballantine Books in 1978 but for several years that work stalled. The markets for children and young adults provided crucial opportunities, as when editor Roger Elwood solicited contributions of short genre fiction to anthologies. She was able to deliver "The Smallest Dragonboy" and the four-part story of Killashandra:

- "Prelude to a Crystal Song", Continuum 1 (Apr 1974)
- "Killashandra – Crystal Singer", Continuum 2 (Aug 1974)
- "Milekey Mountain", Continuum 3 (Dec 1974)
- "Killashandra – Coda and Finale", Continuum 4 (Aug 1975)

McCaffrey called the 1982 novel a "considerably expanded" version of the four-part work and acknowledged "the technical assistance of Ron Massey, Langshot Stables, Surrey" for its transformation.

In fact the first three sections of the novel—through Killashandra's return from her first experience cutting crystal in the field—are moderately revised and heavily revised versions of the first and third 1974 stories, "Prelude to a Crystal Song" and "Milekey Mountain". In the second and fourth original stories she is a veteran of more than 100 years in the field. Whether and how she may be able to go on as a woman on vacation (#2) and as the miner of her claim (#4) are primary themes.

Killashandra is a small town in north central Ireland, about 120 km northwest of Dublin.

"Milekey Mountain" was adapted in comics form (artist uncredited) in the 1979 publication Questar: Illustrated Science Fiction Classics (Golden Press, ISBN 0307111970). This adaptation also included material from the first two stories in order to provide an "origin story" for Killashandra. In Questar the story was retitled Crystal Singer.

== Plot summary (1982 novel) ==
Killashandra Ree has spent ten years studying music and training to be a vocal soloist, anticipating interstellar celebrity. After a final exam she learns that a flaw in her voice will prevent her from singing lead. She dreads a life limited to choral work and supporting operatic roles so she plans to exit both school and home planet discreetly.

At the spaceport she meets a vital, older man who uses perfect pitch, and his occupational experience as a "crystal singer" on Ballybran, to identify an incoming space shuttle on the verge of explosion. He treats her to a whirlwind romance and the experience of her home planet in ways entirely unknown to her, but sincerely warns her against the high-status, high-income occupation that makes such a vacation possible for him. Further, one of its occupational hazards leaves him in a coma, but Killashandra determines to accompany his return home under life support, and to investigate membership in the Heptite Guild of crystal singers for herself.

The crystalline rock of Ballybran, when skilfully cut, is essential to advanced power and communications systems at the heart of interstellar civilization. Only the Guild "singers" can mine crystal: locate it, and cut it with voice-controlled machinery. Killashandra's ability to sing perfect pitch meets one qualification, she knows, and she passes other qualifying exams in the staging area on Ballybran's moon.

Travel to Ballybran itself, however, is forbidden to all but its resident singers and supporting population, about 30,000 people. The moon-side orientation program secretly explains why: a native spore soon invades the human body and causes genetic mutations. Some newcomers will die of the initial infection and many will adapt only partly, with a mix of permanent symptoms such as vastly increased visual acuity along with complete deafness. Those who adapt fully to symbiotic life may become singers and other survivors must join the staff. The symbiont maintains its host, perhaps for hundreds of years, but only on Ballybran; only the fully adapted singers can safely depart, and only briefly.

Full adaptation brings remarkable benefits, including increased sensory perception, rapid tissue regeneration and a vastly prolonged life expectancy, but it renders all hosts sterile, and eventually causes severe memory loss, paranoia and dementia. Even after full adaptation with the symbiont, mining Ballybran crystal is a dangerous occupation. Beside the risks associated with other mining operations, there are frequent storms with high winds that may cause crystal deposits to resonate: "sonic storms" that may impair the symbiont and drive the singer mad.

The Guild provides life support for physically disabled or insane members. Many aspects of the industry are centralized, and everyone begins with debts. Yet, singers in the field are solo adventurers who establish private claims, work them in secret, and sometimes amass great fortunes.

Killashandra and thirty others accept the personal risks and make the commitment. The story follows her and her classmates in a general education program, awaiting infection. When her own adaptation is unusually rapid and easy, she advances alone to rapid acquaintance with the rules and customs, transport and cutting equipment, emergency procedures, commercial values, and some of the planet-bound specialists. She is especially sensitive to "black crystal", the rarest and most valuable variety. Partly for that talent, the Guild Master Lanzecki becomes her mentor (but soon her lover as well). Before any of her classmates learns to fly or to cut, she is in the field. She is first to find the unknown claim of a black crystal miner recently destroyed in a crash, and she cuts some of it adequately.

Killashandra's rapid adaptation and training have isolated her from the other newcomers and her continued success has fostered jealousy, she sees even in her closest friends among the former classmates. She accepts an assignment offered by Lanzecki, to install "her" set of crystals in a recently settled planetary system. The cost of a black crystal set is high, even on the planetary scale, which has made its acquisition politically controversial and its installation a celebrity event. Killashandra must not only complete the technical installation but also represent the Guild in a public performance not unlike her one-time aspiration. She succeeds on both counts.

== Trilogy ==
McCaffrey continued the biography of Killashandra Ree in two sequels, Killashandra (1986) and Crystal Line (1992). The original Continuum stories ended with Killashandra's death, while the trilogy follows her over the course of many centuries and ends on a more hopeful note as new technology and discoveries conquer many of the difficulties that made her career perilous.

=== Killashandra ===
The story opens with Killashandra in debt to the Heptite Guild and desperate to make enough money to escape Ballybran before the seasonal sonic storms. The Guildmaster offers her an opportunity to travel to the music-loving planet of Optheria to install a set of Crystals on their damaged Crystal-powered organ in time for their upcoming Festival, an easy task that will allow Killashandra to clear her debt and escape the storms. Optheria is a pacifist planet alleged to be so perfect that none of its citizens ever desire to travel elsewhere. Upon arrival, Killashandra discovers the organ was deliberately sabotaged. She suspects that the Optherian officials are concealing the full truth about both the organ and the happiness of the Optherian citizens.

Before she can investigate further, Killashandra is kidnapped by rebels from a local chain of islands. Marooned for weeks and left to fend for herself, Killashandra uses her symbiote-enhanced resilience to swim from island to island until she finds an inhabited one, where she comes face to face with her kidnapper, Lars Dahl. Killashandra's arduous swim has so physically altered her that Lars does not recognize her, allowing her to gain his confidence in order to learn why she was kidnapped. Killashandra confirms that the Optherian leaders effectively forbid unhappy citizens from leaving the planet, in violation of Federation law, and that they use the Crystal organ to transmit highly illegal subliminal hallucinations to the population at the seasonal Festivals in order to keep them compliant. The islanders, who are less influenced by the subliminals, made a plan to destroy the organ, then kidnap the Crystal Singer sent to repair it, creating an interplanetary incident that would demand a full investigation.

By this time Killashandra and Lars have fallen in love, presenting an emotional crisis for Killashandra as she cannot survive on Optheria and Lars cannot follow her to Ballybran. Killashandra reveals herself and volunteers to further the islanders' plans by having Lars return her to the mainland and present himself as her rescuer. She will locate and sabotage the organ's hidden subliminal projector under the guise of repairing the organ, then report the human rights violations to the Federation. The plan succeeds and the subliminals are disabled, but Lars is now under suspicion of the government. To protect him from reprisal, Killashandra and a fellow Singer smuggle him off the planet under the guise of arresting him for Killashandra's kidnapping.

At an automated trial, Killashandra speaks in Lars' defense, but when stress monitors misread her concern for him as fear, the computerized judge believes he has threatened her and finds him guilty. Killashandra returns to Ballybran despondent, certain she will never see Lars again, but the influential Heptite Guild appeals on Lars's behalf. He receives a new trial, is cleared, and secretly applies to the Guild as a Singer. His transition succeeds, and the lovers reunite.

- Library of Congress Classification PS3563.A255 K48 1985

=== Crystal Line ===
In the centuries after the events of the previous book, Killashandra and Lars have worked the Crystal Ranges together. Killashandra begins to succumb to the memory loss associated with singing Crystal, leaving her dangerously paranoid and careless. Lars tries to tempt her away from the Ranges in hopes that time away from Ballybran will forestall the inevitable, but Killashandra holds out for one good cutting to pay off their considerable debts, risking their lives in the process.

Finally Guildmaster Lanzecki gives Lars and Killashandra an off-planet assignment to investigate a recently discovered entity: a giant liquid crystalline mass termed "Jewel Junk". Since Crystal facilitates communication, Killashandra feeds the Junk a few shards of Crystal, which causes it to respond. Killashandra concludes the Junk is sentient and trying to communicate.

Returning to Ballybran early, Killashandra finds Lanzecki, her former lover, has gone into the Ranges during a fierce sonic storm that kills him, leaving Lars the new Guildmaster. Killashandra suspects Lanzecki had grown tired of his long life and, sensing his memory fading, chose to commit suicide. His death leaves Killashandra bitter, alienating her from Lars, which in turn accelerates her memory loss as she loses her connection to the life they shared.

As the new Guildmaster, Lars discovers that the Guild's operating model has left it with a massive backlog, with much of the Guild's profits going to support the mindless husks of hundreds of former Singers. In addition there are far too few active Singers to keep the Guild viable, and the perils of Crystal Singing mean new applicants are few and far between. A new medic on Ballybran introduces a method of hypnotizing mindless Singers to recover coordinates where Crystal can be found. Killashandra finds this new method unethical, but it proves highly profitable, though there are still too few active Singers to fully take advantage of it.

A delegation from the Federation makes a rare, dangerous journey to Ballybran's surface to inform the Guild that the Jewel Junk has grown larger and more active since Killshandra's interference, creating a political crisis: if the Junk proves sentient, it must be declared a citizen and given rights and protection; if not, it will be exploited as a natural resource. Killashandra is assigned an experiment to feed the Junk Crystal of all colors, including the powerful Black. As Killashandra lays the Black Crystal into the Jewel Junk, the Junk draws her arm into its mass and extracts centuries of accumulated sonic residue from her body, restoring her full memory. Her old personality returns as she remembers her love for Lars. The Junk is declared sentient, and its power insures no future Singers will risk losing their memory and offers hope that former Singers may be restored, promising a new era of prosperity for the Guild.

- Library of Congress Classification PS3563.A255 C65 1992

=== Omnibus editions ===
The trilogy was published in omnibus editions The Crystal Singer Trilogy (US: Del Rey Books, 1996) and The Crystal Singer Omnibus (UK: Corgi Books, 1999).

- Library of Congress Classification: PS3563.A255 C73 1996

== Crystal universe ==
A sidequel of the Crystal Singer trilogy, the Internet Speculative Fiction Database places in the Crystal universe both The Coelura, a 1983 novella, and Nimisha's Ship, a 1998 novel.

In turn, the Crystal universe is only one of several series that share the "Federated Sentient Planets" background; they are set in a universe governed by the FSP. Federation regulations and officials appear substantially in the Crystal Singer trilogy, in sharp contrast to the Dragonriders of Pern series among others.

== Reception ==
When it came to Crystal Line, the third installment of the trilogy, Publishers Weekly deemed the effort a "disappointment".

== Awards ==
The Crystal Singer placed seventh for the 1983 annual Locus Award for Best Science Fiction Novel, voted by Locus readers. It was one of six finalists for the Balrog Award in the novel class.

== Sources ==
- McCaffrey, Todd (1999). Dragonholder: The Life and Dreams (So Far) of Anne McCaffrey by her son. New York: Ballantine Books. ISBN 0-345-42217-1.
