= Song of Sorcery =

- Cover
- Author: Elizabeth Ann Scarborough
- Language: English
- Publication date: 1982

Song of Sorcery is a 1982 novel written by Elizabeth Ann Scarborough.

== Plot summary ==
Song of Sorcery is a novel in which young hearthwitch Maggie with domestic magic embarks on a quest to find her sister, who has mysteriously run off with a gypsy. Accompanied by her grandmother's cat familiar and Colin, a young minstrel, Maggie encounters a variety of creatures — both natural and supernatural — while unraveling the mysteries behind an evil sorcerer's schemes. Her seemingly mundane magic, which aids in household tasks like food preservation and cleaning, proves unexpectedly useful on the adventure. However, witches have limitations, including an allergy to rowan trees, which serve as protective barriers against sorcery. As the action builds, Maggie and her companions confront the sorcerer.

== Reception ==
David Dunham reviewed Song of Sorcery for Different Worlds magazine and stated that "Overall, I found Song Of Sorcery a fun book to read. Though it got too whimsical at times, things did make sense."

== Reviews ==
- Review by Faren Miller (1982) in Locus, #253 February 1982
- Review by Jeff Frane (1982) in Locus, #253 February 1982
- Review by Mary Frances Zambreno [as by Mary Zambreno] (1982) in American Fantasy, February 1982
- Review by Baird Searles (1982) in Isaac Asimov's Science Fiction Magazine, April 1982
- Review by Michael W. McClintock (1982) in Science Fiction & Fantasy Book Review, #4, May 1982
- Review [French] by André-François Ruaud? (1994) in Yellow Submarine, #111
