= The Rowan =

1990 novel by Anne McCaffrey

- First edition
- Author: Anne McCaffrey
- Cover artist: Romas Kukalis
- Series: The Tower and the Hive
- Genre: Science fiction
- Publisher: Ace Books
- Publication date: 1990
- Publication place: US
- Pages: 328
- Followed by: Damia

The Rowan (1990) is a science fiction novel by American writer Anne McCaffrey, the first book in The Tower and the Hive series (also known as The Rowan series). It is set in the universe of the Pegasus trilogy, against a backdrop of a technologically advanced society in which telepathy, psychokinesis and other psychic talents have become scientifically accepted and researched. Telekinetic and telepathic powers are used to communicate and teleport spaceships through space, thus avoiding the light barrier and allowing for the colonization of other planetary systems.

In the series, psionic powers occur of varying strength, the possessors being ranked from T12 (the weakest) to T1 (the strongest). The very strongest are employed as "T1 Primes" by an independent company, FT&T (Federated Telepaths and Teleporters) for teleporting cargo and passengers between the systems.

== Plot summary ==
The Rowan tells the life story of a young orphan, of Prime Talent, from the moment the child's community is wiped out in a mudslide to the time when she becomes a Prime and after a life of loneliness falls in love with a previously undiscovered Prime on Deneb which was being attacked by aliens.

The central section of the book is based on McCaffrey's earlier short story "Lady in the Tower".

=== Characters ===
==== The Rowan/Angharad Gwyn ====
- Talent level: T-1 telekinetic/telepath; Callisto Prime
- Physical description: with silver-white hair and grey eyes (though stated to be brown on page 17 of the Ace/Putnam 1990 hardcover edition), she has a petite, "bird like" figure.
  - The Rowan is the only survivor of a freak mudslide that destroyed the Rowan Mining Camp on Altair. Trapped in a hopper (ground vehicle) and buried in sludge for days, the 3 year-old toddler's mental cries for help reach every telepath on the planet. Rescued, she is made a "Ward of the Planet" but, with no memory of her life before the mudslide, becomes known as "the Rowan child". She grows up under the care of Lusena, a child therapist who becomes her foster mother.

Well aware of her Prime potential, her guardians move her to Altair's Tower at the age of twelve, to be instructed in the use of her Talent by Altair's Prime, Siglen. After a difficult learning curve and lonely adolescence she ultimately reaches Prime status and is installed on Jupiter's moon, Callisto.

==== Siglen ====
- Talent level: T-1 telekinetic/telepath; Altair Prime
- Physical description: Siglen was a slab of a female, soft from a sedentary life and a disinclination to exercise of any kind.
  - Siglen proved to be more harm than good when it came to dealing with the Rowan. She was not empathic towards the child and instilled a neurosis (a form of agoraphobia that prevents interstellar teleports) in the three Primes that she trained. She has no empathy and is very trying for her staff and personnel to deal with. She is described as a "mistress of the putdown" and a generally unlikeable person.

==== Lusena ====
- Talent level: T-8 telepath; junior therapist
  - Lusena took the young Rowan in as her own. She already had two older children, Bardy and Finnan. Lusena died in a crash when the Rowan was eighteen.

==== Goswina Lyon ====
- Talent level: T-5 empath
  - Goswina first met the Rowan when she, along with seven other young Talents, traveled to Altair for a course on Tower management and maintenance. She soon realized that she and the Rowan could not work efficiently together and so recommended her brother Afra, who at the time was six. The Rowan then promised to make sure Afra came to Altair for the course when he was old enough.

==== Afra Lyon ====
- Talent level: T-4 (later T-3 then T-2) telekinetic/telepath
- Physical description: blonde hair, slightly green skin, yellow eyes, tall/slender figure.
  - The Lyon family is from Capella, a "Methody" planet known for its adherence to rules and manners (and its colonists' unusual pigmentation). Afra, however, was slightly different, as life on Capella did not appeal to him. At eighteen, Afra spent all his money to send a resume to the Rowan, the new Callisto Prime. The Prime sent for him the very next day. Afra was to the Rowan's liking and became second in command of the Tower.

==== Jeff Raven ====
- Talent level: T-1 telekinetic/telepath
- Physical description: black hair and piercing blue eyes.
  - Jeff Raven was born on Deneb where a large population of "Wild Talents" resides. He first contacted the Rowan telepathically when he "heard" her getting ready to start her transportation work on Callisto. Jeff informed her that Deneb was under attack by hostile alien forces. The Rowan informed Earth Prime who refused to believe the words of an "unknown Talent"; Jeff quickly verified the attack was legitimate by telekinetically hurtling a missile towards Earth (which was quite an extraordinary feat considering how remote Deneb was and that the generator he tapped into for power was on the verge of collapse).

==== Isthia Raven ====
- Talent level: never tested, but she has a "long ear" and "loud voice".
  - Isthia is the mother of Jeff Raven. She gathered a team of other untrained Talents to help her contact the Rowan telepathically when Jeff was badly injured in an accident after the attacks.

==== Peter Reidinger IV ====
- Talent level: T-1 telekinetic/telepath; Earth Prime
- Physical description: Black hair, close trimmed red beard and moustache. He is the descendant of the same Peter Reidinger who is featured in Pegasus in Flight and Pegasus in Space.
- The Reidinger family is full of extremely high Talents, and Peter Reidinger IV is one of the most powerful and runs FT&T.

==== Elizara Matheson ====
- Talent level: T-1 Medic/Ob. Deft, compassionate, sensible and reassuring, Elizara is Prime Reidinger's great-granddaughter. She became a close friend and confidant of the Gwyn-Raven families, and later the Lyons, when she was assigned by Reidinger to assist the Rowan during her first pregnancy. Elizara is extremely skilled in metamorphic healing as well as physical. She is later re-introduced into the series as the very talented teacher of her gifted namesake, Zara Raven-Lyon, one of Damia's many children.

==== Brian Ackerman ====
Talent Level: T-9; Callisto Stationmaster

==== Primes ====
Primes of FT&T are T-1 telekinetic/telepaths and they are the rarest manifestation of Talent:

- Earth Prime: Peter Reidinger IV
- Altair Prime: Siglen
- Capella Prime: Capella
- Betelguese Prime: David
- Callisto Prime: The Rowan
- Procyon Prime: Guzman
