= Dragonsong =

1976 science fantasy novel by Anne McCaffrey

- First edition
- Author: Anne McCaffrey
- Cover artist: Fred Marcellino (first) and others (Note: Dragonsong title listing at the Internet Speculative Fiction Database identifies five cover artists for US editions and hosts at least thumbnail images of their front covers: Fred Marcellino, first edition; Elizabeth Malczynski, first paperback; Rowena Morrill, 1986 ppb; Greg Call, 2003 ppb; and Sammy Yuen, 2008 ppb. The first paperback did not credit Malczynski; the database cites her Elizabeth Malczynski Littman gallery where the first six works on display present her three paintings for wraparound covers of Dragonsong, Dragonsinger, and Dragondrums (The Harper Hall trilogy). • Official Pern Art at the Pern Museum maintained by Hans van der Boom identifies two cover artists responsible for all three books in French paperback editions, Didier Thimonier (Albin Michel, 1988/1989) and Wojciech Siudmak (Presses Pocket). The former earlier edition is entirely missing from ISFDB. Retrieved 2011-10-18. • Neither ISFDB nor Official Pern Art reports a cover artist for the first UK edition (Sidgwick & Jackson, Oct 1976); neither shows even a thumbnail image. Jointly they do identify David Roe, Steve Weston, and Les Edwards for later UK editions. David Roe was the cover artist for the first UK paperback, and the sources jointly note by reference to.)
- Language: English
- Series: Dragonriders of Pern; The Harper Hall Trilogy
- Genre: Science fiction; Young adult
- Publisher: Atheneum Books (first hardcover)
- Publication date: March 1976
- Publication place: United States
- Media type: Print (hardcover, paperback)
- Pages: 202 (first edition)
- ISBN: 978-0-689-30507-8
- OCLC: 2054712
- LC Class: PZ7.M122834 Dr3
- Preceded by: Dragonquest
- Followed by: Dragonsinger

Dragonsong is a science fantasy novel by the American-Irish author Anne McCaffrey. Published by Atheneum Books in March 1976, it is the third book in the Dragonriders of Pern series set on the fictional planet Pern. Dragonsong had a new publisher, editor, and target audience of young adults, and became the first book in the Harper Hall of Pern trilogy. The original Dragonriders of Pern trilogy with Ballantine Books was not completed until after the publication of Dragonsong and its sequel. (Note: The original trilogy was released as The Dragonriders of Pern in the first omnibus edition, October 1978 by the Doubleday Science Fiction Book Club. Publication listing: The Dragonriders of Pern (omnibus, first edition, October 1978). ISFDB. • The Harper Hall trilogy was released as The Harper Hall of Pern in the first omnibus edition, July 1984 by the Doubleday SFBC. • Publication listing: The Harper Hall of Pern (omnibus, first edition, July 1984). ISFDB. The front cover of a Harper Hall book named the Dragonriders of Pern series at least so early as the first UK paperback edition of Dragondrums (Corgi, 1981). Three lines at the bottom boldly proclaim: "The latest tales of the magnificent Dragonriders of Pern from the author of The White Dragon". Dragondrums (1st Corgi printing, 1981). ISFDB. Retrieved 2011-10-19.)

Dragonsong and the second Pern book Dragonquest are set at the same time, seven years after the end of the seminal Dragonflight, and more than 2500 years after human settlement, during the "Ninth Pass" of the Red Star that periodically brings a biological menace from space. Their primary geographical settings are not distant in space yet worlds apart: Dragonsong in an isolated sea-hold and Dragonquest at the centers of Pernese society, the weyrs and major holds, especially Benden Weyr. Near the end of Dragonsong, the protagonist Menolly is rescued by a dragonrider, and the action converges with that of Dragonquest.

== Origins ==
McCaffrey finished Dragonquest, a sequel to the first Pern book, soon after her 1970 emigration to Ireland but she wrote several stories and a few books before completing the original Dragonriders trilogy. (Note: In fact, she wrote several stories and a few books 1971–75, before Dragonsong. Dragonholder 1999, pp. 74, 82–83, 94–95.) Writing The White Dragon did not really begin until 1974/75 after the New England Science Fiction Association invited her to its annual convention Boskone as Guest of Honor, which included the special publication of a small book for sale on site. (Note: She wrote the novella A Time When which would become the first part of The White Dragon. • Dragonholder 1999, pp. 98, 101, 107. • Boskone 12, March 1975 (no date). NESFA Press. Retrieved 2011-10-19. • A Time When by Anne McCaffrey NESFA Press. Retrieved 2007-02-08.)

The market for young adults provided crucial opportunities while Dragonriders stalled. Editor Roger Elwood sought contributions of short work to anthologies and McCaffrey started the Pern story of Menolly for him, although in the end she delivered four 1973/74 stories that later became Crystal Singer. Editor Jean E. Karl, who had established the children's and science fiction imprints at Atheneum Books, sought to attract more female readers to science fiction and solicited "a story for young women in a different part of Pern". McCaffrey completed Menolly's story as Dragonsong and contracted for a sequel before it was out in 1976.

Like Crystal Singer, Dragonsong features a young woman with great musical talent. Beside fishing, its focus in Pernese society is the arts and education, in contrast to the military and political focus of the original trilogy. In this the action at Harper Hall rather than the Weyrs is akin to McCaffrey's own experience. At Radcliffe College, Harvard, she majored in Slavic languages and literature. From her teens through her thirties, before she turned to writing full-time, she pursued musical avocations: piano lessons, voice training and performance, and assisting in amateur production of musicals and operettas.

== Plot summary ==
Taking place seven years after the events of Dragonflight, the book opens with Menolly, youngest daughter of Masterfisher Yanus, Sea Holder of Half-Circle Seahold, (Note: The map in Dragonsong locates the hold on the East coast of Nerat but the maps in succeeding books place it on the West coast.) in the fictional world of Pern. Menolly, a gifted young musician, has been assisting the Hold's ailing Harper Petiron in his duties to educate the Hold's children. After Petiron's death, however, a new Harper arrives as his replacement. Menolly's parents forbid her to reveal that she has been teaching the children in the interim, believing that music and particularly teaching are not a woman's place. To conceal her former role from the new Harper, Menolly is not allowed to play, sing, or compose, and her parents severely punish her for doing so. Unbeknownst to Menolly or her parents, prior to his death Petiron sent several of Menolly's original compositions to Masterharper Robinton at Harper Hall, where Robinton is now frantic to locate this mysterious new composer, though unaware that the composer is female.

Frustrated and heartbroken, Menolly chooses to leave her Hold and live Holdless, a dangerous enterprise as flesh-eating Thread fall regularly on the area. She is entirely unaware that Masterharper Robinton has directed the new harper at Half-Circle Seahold to find the composer in order to train them as a Harper. Menolly finds a safe cave near the sea and makes it her new home. She also discovers a nest of the legendary fire-lizards, smaller versions of the giant dragons that defend Pern from Thread. She assists the fire-lizard queen in relocating her clutch to safety, thereby winning the creature's trust. Menolly is present when the clutch hatches and inadvertently Impresses nine hatchlings, forming a symbiotic, psychic bond with them and making herself responsible for their care. Feeding both her fire-lizards and herself is a full-time job, but Menolly is resourceful and content. She resumes her music and is delighted when her fire-lizards learn to harmonize with her songs.

One day while gathering food for her fire-lizards, Menolly is caught on the edge of Threadfall. She attempts to race the leading edge back to the safety of her cave, lacerating the soles of her feet in the effort. A passing dragonrider rescues her at the last second and takes her to Benden Weyr, which is full of guests in preparation for a dragon hatching. Menolly is shocked to find others at the Weyr have fire-lizards and that the creatures' discovery and potential has become a point of deep interest to dragonriders. When Menolly's nine fire-lizards come looking for her, Menolly reluctantly admits that she accidentally Impressed them all, thus becoming the center of attention.

Robinton, who is present at Benden for the Hatching, is intrigued that Menolly has taught her fire-lizards to sing. On the pretense of having Menolly show him her fire-lizards' ability, Robinton tricks her into performing one of the songs written by Petiron's mysterious apprentice, thus revealing that she is the composer. Menolly is overwhelmed when Robinton invites her to Harper Hall to become his apprentice and gladly accepts the offer.

== Themes ==
Fixed gender roles make Menolly an outcast, as she is unskilled at tasks which are regarded as women's work on Pern and excels in the male-dominated field of music. She chooses to live alone in the dangerously unprotected world outside the Hold instead of allowing her natural talents to be suppressed.

== Awards ==
The American Library Association in 1999 cited the two early Pern trilogies (Dragonriders and Harper Hall), along with The Ship Who Sang, when McCaffrey received the annual Margaret A. Edwards Award for her "lifetime contribution in writing for teens".
