= Lyon's Pride =

1994 novel by Anne McCaffrey

- First US edition (published by Ace Books), cover art by Romas Kukalis
- Author: Anne McCaffrey
- Series: The Tower and the Hive
- Publisher: Ace Books
- Publication date: February 16, 1994
- ISBN: 0-399-13907-9
- Preceded by: Damia's Children
- Followed by: The Tower and the Hive

Lyon's Pride is a 1994 novel by Irish author Anne McCaffrey, which continues the storyline begun in Damia's Children. It was published by Ace in the US/Canada, and Bantam in the UK.

Humans and their alien allies the Mrdini slowly begin to get the upper hand in their war against the voracious Hivers, with the help of the powerful psychic Talents of the Raven-Lyon family. The novel also describes some of the tensions between humanity and the Mrdini, and describes why the 'Dini have such a different attitude toward war and death than humans.

The conclusion of the Hiver War is told in The Tower and the Hive.
