= Dragonsinger =

1977 novel by Anne McCaffrey

- First edition
- Author: Anne McCaffrey
- Cover artist: Fred Marcellino (US, pictured); Colin Saxton (UK); and others (Note: Dragonsinger title listing at the Internet Speculative Fiction Database identifies five cover artists for US editions and hosts at least thumbnail images of their front covers: Fred Marcellino, first edition; Elizabeth Malczynski, first paperback; Rowena Morrill, 1986 ppb; Greg Call, 2003 ppb; and Sammy Yuen, 2008 ppb. The first paperback did not credit Malczynski; the database cites her Elizabeth Malczynski Littman gallery where the first six works present her three paintings for wraparound covers of Dragonsong, Dragonsinger, and Dragondrums (the Harper Hall trilogy). • Official Pern Art, at the Pern Museum maintained by Hans van der Boom identifies two cover artists responsible for all three books in French paperback editions, Didier Thimonier (Albin Michel, 1988/1989) and Wojciech Siudmak (Presses Pocket). The former earlier edition is entirely missing from ISFDB. Retrieved 2011-10-18. • Those two paragraphs pertain to all three books in the so-called Harper Hall trilogy, as the US and French editions used artists who "covered" all three books. • ISFDB identifies only David Roe (The Dragondaze Portfolio at his personal website) among cover artists for UK editions. Official Pern Art identifies Colin Saxton (first UK), Roe (first UK paperback), Steve Weston and Les Edwards (later UK editions) and shows some image of all four front covers or cover paintings. Retrieved 2011-10-19.)
- Language: English
- Series: Dragonriders of Pern; Harper Hall Trilogy
- Genre: Science fiction; Young adult
- Publisher: Atheneum Books
- Publication date: February 1977
- Publication place: United States
- Media type: Print (hardcover & paperback)
- Pages: 264 (first edition)
- ISBN: 978-0-689-30570-2
- OCLC: 2425288
- LC Class: PZ7.M122834 Dp
- Preceded by: Dragonsong
- Followed by: The White Dragon

Dragonsinger is a young adult science fiction novel by the American-Irish author Anne McCaffrey. Published by Atheneum Books in 1977, it is the fourth book in the Dragonriders of Pern series.

As the sequel to Dragonsong, it was the second book in the Harper Hall of Pern trilogy, with a new publisher, editor, and target audience (young adults). The original Dragonriders of Pern trilogy was completed after publication of the first two Harper Hall books.

== Plot summary ==
The novel follows Menolly, now apprenticed into the Harper Hall, a type of music conservatory for harpers (minstrels/educators) and other music professionals, as she begins her musical training to become a harper herself one day. The story begins within hours of the final events of Dragonsong, rounding out the tale of Menolly's coming of age.

Menolly arrives at Harper Hall to find herself the center of unwanted attention and conflict, not the least of which are about her nine fire lizards. As the Hall's first female apprentice, the Masters are divided on whether or not she is worth training, causing Menolly to be greeted with various degrees of ambivalence. Due to her gender, she is not allowed to share a dormitory with her fellow all-male apprentices and must be housed with the female students, most of whom are "rank-happy", few of whom are serious musicians and most of whom shun Menolly as an outsider. Conversely, because she dorms with the students, many of the apprentices reject her, claiming she is not truly one of them, and leaving Menolly confused as to her true place in Harper Hall.

In spite of these challenges, Menolly excels at all aspects of her training, becoming Masterharper Robinton's personal apprentice while continuing to compose original tunes. She also becomes helpful to the Dragonriders by teaching them what she knows about fire-lizards, and presents Masterharper Robinton and his Journeyman Sebell with fire-lizards of their own. One night Menolly is woken by her frantic fire-lizards, who show her a terrifying vision of a Dragonrider and his dragon falling from the sky. It is later revealed that the telepathic Dragons actually witnessed this event halfway across the world and transmitted the image to the fire-lizards, who in turn showed Menolly. The incident confirms suspicions that fire-lizards share a telepathic link with dragons and that they may have other undiscovered gifts.

By the end of her first week, all the Masters agree that Menolly has essentially completed her apprenticeship under her Hold's Harper Petiron long before she came to the Harper Hall. Much to her surprise, Menolly is promoted to Journeyman. During all of this, Menolly befriends many people, including Hall servant Camo, fellow apprentice Piemur and student Lady Audiva.

== Awards ==
The American Library Association in 1999 cited the two early Pern trilogies (Dragonriders and Harper Hall), along with The Ship Who Sang, when McCaffrey received the annual Margaret A. Edwards Award for her "lifetime contribution in writing for teens".

Dragonsinger placed ninth for the annual Locus Award for Best Novel.
