= Pegasus in Flight =

1990 novel by Anne McCaffrey

- First edition
- Author: Anne McCaffrey
- Cover artist: Michael Whelan
- Language: English
- Series: Talents Universe
- Release number: 2
- Genre: Science fiction
- Publisher: Del Rey Books, Ballantine Books
- Publication date: December 1990
- Publication place: United States
- Media type: Print
- Pages: 290
- ISBN: 0345368967
- OCLC: 21410058
- Preceded by: To Ride Pegasus
- Followed by: Pegasus in Space

Pegasus in Flight (1990) is a science fiction novel by American writer Anne McCaffrey set in her "Talents Universe". It is the sequel to a 1973 collection of short stories, To Ride Pegasus, and its 2000 sequel Pegasus in Space completed a trilogy.

Pegasus in Flight continues the story of the Talents, a group of powerful psychics whose abilities have become vital to the Earth's economy, but the same abilities that make them so valued, also make them targets of exploitation, and the world's most ambitious project, the Padrugoi space station, requires the Talents to make great sacrifices for the good of the entire planet.

== Characters ==
This novel introduces several characters:

- Rhyssa Owen: Head of the Parapsychic Center, a powerful telepath who will stop at nothing to protect her people's rights.
- Boris Roznine: Chief of the LEO (Law Enforcement and Order) organization, a by-the-book cop and skilled telepath as well.
- Sascha Roznine: Boris' twin, he shares a strong mental link with his brother—but their loyalties sometimes conflict.
- Tirla: Illegal street-child and expert survivor, Tirla uses her hidden Talent for communication to make herself useful to the criminals who run the Linears, the overcrowded housing projects of the mega-city of Jerhattan.
- Peter Reidinger: A teenage boy trapped in a paralyzed body, but with the most powerful mental abilities on Earth.
- Ponsit Prosit: A self-proclaimed "reverend" and con artist who uses religion to stir up the masses for his own gain and hides a dark secret.
- Prince Phanibal Shimaz: Traffic engineer and Prince of Malaysia West, he is closely involved in the project. Shimaz is an expert in Josephson junctions.
- Ludmilla Barchenka: Fanatical head of the Padrugoi project, she sees all people—Talent or otherwise—as resources to be used up and cast aside.
