= Damia's Children =

1993 novel by Anne McCaffrey

- Author: Anne McCaffrey
- Series: The Tower and the Hive
- Genre: Science fiction
- Published: 1993 (Ace Books)
- Pages: 272
- ISBN: 0-399-13817-X
- OCLC: 26503922
- Dewey Decimal: 813/.54 20
- LC Class: PS3563.A255 D4 1993
- Preceded by: Damia
- Followed by: Lyon's Pride

Damia's Children is a 1993 science fiction novel by American writer Anne McCaffrey and a part of the Talent series. Damia's Children forms a two-part story with the novel Lyon's Pride.

== Plot ==
Humanity has found a new ally in their ongoing war against the Beetle Hive, a tenacious species called the Mrdini. In order to better understand each other, some humans and 'Dinis are raised together from childhood; one such family are the children of Damia and Afra Lyon, powerful psychic Talents of the Raven-Lyon clan who form the backbone of humanity's teleportation network. The two species' common enemy, the expansionist Beetle aliens, are once again encroaching on inhabited territory, necessitating that despite their youth, Damia's Children must become the last line of defense for both Human and 'Dini.

Damia's Children tells the first half of a story which is continued in Lyon's Pride.
