= Pegasus in Space =

2000 novel by Anne McCaffrey

- First US edition
- Author: Anne McCaffrey
- Cover artist: Bruce Jensen; Min Choi
- Language: English
- Series: Talents Universe
- Release number: 3
- Genre: Science fiction
- Publisher: Del Rey Books
- Publication date: April 2000
- Publication place: United States
- Media type: Print
- Pages: 373
- ISBN: 0345434668
- OCLC: 42692141
- Preceded by: Pegasus in Flight

Pegasus in Space (2000) is a science fiction novel by American writer Anne McCaffrey, set in her Talents Universe series. It is the sequel to Pegasus in Flight and it completed a trilogy initiated in 1969.

This novel serves as a bridge between the Pegasus and the Tower and Hive books, two Talents sub-series. It establishes Peter Reidinger as the first Prime and shows the origins of the Tower system of teleporters seen in The Rowan and its sequels.

== Synopsis ==
Peter Reidinger, the telepathic and telekinetic Talent introduced in Pegasus in Flight, proves to be one of the most important psychic Talents in human history; his ability to tap into outside sources of energy gives him potentially unlimited power, but there are ruthless enemies of all Talent who must be stopped, or all mankind will pay the price.
