= Killashandra (novel) =

1985 novel by Anne McCaffrey

First edition (publ. Del Rey Books) Cover artist: Michael Whelan

Killashandra is a novel by Anne McCaffrey published in 1985, the second novel in the Crystal Singer trilogy.

== Plot summary ==
Killashandra Ree is in debt to the Heptite Guild and desperate to make enough money to escape Ballybran before the seasonal sonic storms. The Guildmaster offers her an opportunity to travel to the music-loving planet of Optheria to install a set of Crystals on their damaged Crystal-powered organ in time for their upcoming Music Festival, an easy task that will allow Killashandra to clear her debt and escape the storms. She is also to gather information on Optheria, a 'peaceful' planet alleged to be so perfect that none of its citizens ever desire to travel elsewhere. Killashandra soon discovers that the organ was deliberately sabotaged, and begins to suspect that Optherian officials are concealing the full truth about both the organ and the happiness of its citizens.

Attacked on arrival, Killashandra is later kidnapped before she can even begin to investigate, regaining consciousness to find herself marooned alone on a small tropical island. After weeks of fending for herself she decides to swim the open sea from one island to another to reach civilization, and finally lands on a large, populated one. There she comes face to face with her kidnapper Lars Dahl, a former music student on the mainland and conspirator, but her weeks of exposure have so altered Killashandra's appearance that Lars does not recognize her; she gains his confidence and learns he is part of a rebel conspiracy. Killashandra confirms that Optherian leadership effectively prevent unhappy citizens from leaving the planet, in violation of Federation law, and that they use the Crystal organs to transmit highly illegal subliminal hallucinations, brainwashing the population at the seasonal Music Festivals in order to keep them compliant. The conspirators, who are less influenced by subliminals, made a plan to destroy the organ, then kidnap the Crystal Singer sent to repair it to create an interplanetary incident that would demand a full Federation investigation.

By this time Killashandra and Lars have fallen in love, presenting an emotional crisis for Killashandra as she cannot survive on Optheria and Lars cannot follow her to Ballybran. Killashandra reveals herself and volunteers to further the conspirators' plans by having Lars return her to the mainland and present himself as her rescuer. She will locate and sabotage the organ's hidden subliminal projector under the guise of repairing the organ, then report the human rights violations to the Federation. The plan succeeds and the subliminals are disabled, but Lars is now under suspicion of the government. To protect him from reprisal, Killashandra and a fellow Singer smuggle him off the planet under the guise of arresting him for Killashandra's kidnapping.

At an automated trial, Killashandra speaks in Lars' defense, but when stress monitors misread her concern for him as fear, the computerized judge believes he has threatened her and finds him guilty. Killashandra returns to Ballybran despondent, certain she will never see Lars again. Meanwhile, the Federation has collected enough evidence to justify taking over Optheria and arresting its leadership, and Lars receives a retrial when it is learned that he and Killashandra were married by island custom. He applies to the Heptite Guild to become a Singer. His transition succeeds and the lovers reunite.

== Reception ==
Dave Langford reviewed Killashandra for White Dwarf #77, and stated that "the plot is candyfloss nonsense throughout, but it has a certain charm".

Wendy Graham reviewed Killashandra for Adventurer magazine and stated that "it is not to be read while dieting or after signing the pledge because there is an awful lot of eating and drinking done in the story, by the way".

== Reviews ==
- Review by Len Hatfield (1986) in Fantasy Review, February 1986
- Review by Terry Broome (1986) in Vector #132
- Review by Tom Easton (1986) in Analog Science Fiction and Fact, August 1986
- Review by Pam Meek (1996) in Absolute Magnitude, Winter 1996
