= Damia (novel) =

1992 novel by Anne McCaffrey

- First edition (UK)
- Author: Anne McCaffrey
- Cover artist: Romas Kukalis
- Series: The Tower and the Hive
- Genre: Science fiction
- Publisher: Bantam (March 1992, UK); Ace (July 1992, US)
- Media type: Print (paperback)
- Pages: 352
- ISBN: 978-0-441-13556-1
- OCLC: 27306132
- Preceded by: The Rowan
- Followed by: Damia's Children

Damia is a 1992 science fiction novel by American writer Anne McCaffrey, the sequel to The Rowan, and the second book of The Tower and the Hive series.

== Plot ==
Damia is told mainly from the point of view of Afra Lyon, the Rowan's assistant, a character first introduced in the previous book. It begins with his childhood on the strictly regimented colony planet orbiting Capella. It then shows Lyon's view of the events of The Rowan, followed by his helping to raise Rowan and Jeff Raven's children, especially the precocious and powerful Damia. Lyon later realizes that he has fallen in love with his young ward, which gives him rather conflicted feelings. In the end, the two wind up defending humanity against an even more dangerous alien enemy than the Hive faced by the Rowan.

== Reception ==
A review from Publishers Weekly praised the book, and considered the book to be "engrossing", whereas a negative Kirkus review criticised its plot and stated that it was "[nothing] but weightless balderdash, not so much for the drippy romancing as the dismally cursory aliens".
