= Acorna: The Unicorn Girl =

1997 novel by Anne McCaffrey

- Original cover of Acorna: The Unicorn Girl
- Author: Anne McCaffrey
- Cover artist: John Ellis
- Language: English
- Series: Acorna Universe
- Genre: Science fiction
- Publisher: Eos
- Publication date: July 1998
- Publication place: United States
- Media type: Print (hardback & paperback)
- Pages: 416
- ISBN: 0-06-105789-4
- OCLC: 39460583
- Followed by: Acorna's Quest

Acorna: The Unicorn Girl (1997) is a science fantasy novel by American writers Anne McCaffrey and Margaret Ball. It is the first book in the Acorna Universe series. McCaffrey and Ball wrote the sequel Acorna's Quest after which McCaffrey and Elizabeth Ann Scarborough extended the series almost annually from 1999 to 2007.

== Plot summary ==
=== Synopsis ===
Acorna is found in an unusual escape pod by three galactic miners, Gill, Rafik, and Calum. Raised by the three unlikely foster fathers, Acorna, a unicorn girl, matures almost to adulthood within three years. While she is growing up, the miners discover that their 'daughter' has magical powers such as the ability to clean air and water, heal the sick, and detect the slightest scent. Furthermore, she is extraordinarily smart, picking up everything quickly, but her unique looks and special powers make her an object of desire by many, be it for scientific studies or a rare-item collection, or sex. Gill, Rafik, and Calum, who are determined to protect their beloved Acorna at all cost, are forced to flee all over the galaxy to avoid her pursuers. The book chronicles their adventures together as they travel from system to system, planet to planet, eventually finding a planet that thrives on illegal child slavery. Acorna is not about to let that continue without a fight, and she vows to free every last child on the planet.

=== Infancy ===
The story opens with Acorna's parents' spaceship being chased by the Khleevii, insect-like creatures who have preyed on the Linyaari race for some time. The little spaceship has nowhere else to run and the despairing parents take desperate measures. Knowing that the Khleevii torture their captives, they decide to take a fatal dose of the soporific abaanye, setting a compression device, that will destroy their cruiser (and anything else in its proximity), when the Khleevii spaceship comes close. They place their sedated youngling in a lifepod and eject it just before the defensive weapon triggers. She will have a chance of rescue if the lifepod is not destroyed with her parents' spaceship and that of the attackers. Otherwise, her dose of abaanye will keep her asleep until the air supply runs out and she asphyxiates.

The lifepod is transported by the compression event to an asteroid belt which is being mined by Declan "Gill" Giloglie the Third, Rafik Nadezda and Calum Baird in their ship, the Khedive. Detecting life-signs in the lifepod, they bring it on board and open it, thus discovering the alien occupant, the Linyaari infant they name Acorna.

The asteroid miners elect to continue working until they have an economic payload and then return to "base", Mercantile Mining and Exploration, to whom they are contracted. This decision probably saves Acorna from a fate worse than death. Before their return to MME, it is absorbed by Amalgamated Manufacturing, a rival corporation notorious for its questionable business practices.

Acorna is found to have unique abilities: she can purify water and air, apparently through the use of her horn, a spiral protuberance in the centre of her forehead. Although she is humanoid, she has equine features, a silvery mane of hair and hoof-like feet. Her vocalisations are somewhat horse-like and her diet is exclusively vegetarian. Initially, she attempts to communicate in her native tongue, but soon adopts Basic, the standard language of the Federated Sentient Planets.

Although she asks for "Avi", which the miners realise must mean her mother, later also stating that "Lalli" was on board the spaceship from which her lifepod was ejected, her foster fathers do not realise the extent of her language development and allow her to lose her earlier vocabulary. When Acorna is given writing materials, she seems to produce similar script to that embellishing the lifepod, but the miners do not recognise the significance of this knowledge and it falls into disuse. Acorna learns to read and write Basic instead.

She matures quickly, learns rapidly and appears to have innate mathematical talents. It is discovered that she can also sense the mineral composition of the asteroids her foster fathers are mining, detecting rhenium, a desirable resource, in "Daffodil", currently being mined. This makes her contribution to the mining venture invaluable. By the time the Khedive has a full cargo hold and the miners decide to return to "base", Acorna is an active, working member of the crew, having been with her adopted family for nearly two years when the Khedive returns to the former MME Base.

=== Early childhood ===
The Khedive docks at the Amalgamated Manufacturing Base to unload its cargo and take on supplies. The miners have notified Base of their adopted child and while they are attending to bureaucratic procedures, Dr. Eva Glatt, a member of the Testing, Therapy and Adjustment Department, takes charge of Acorna. Glatt makes assumptions about Acorna, based on her assessment of human children, concluding that Acorna has deformities, arrested development and mental deficiencies.

Dr. Alton Forelle, a psycholinguist, recognises that Acorna may be a member of an alien species and is determined to experiment on her to further his theories on linguistic development, hoping that this work will earn him a university post. His assistant, Judit Kendoro, has sympathy for the child, but feels powerless to prevent the scientific investigations proposed.

Meanwhile, having completed the questionnaires and ancillary paperwork, the miners seek out Glatt in order to have Acorna returned to them. Glatt assures them that they are unsuitable as custodians of the child, explaining that the Personal Psychological Profiles of the miners show that Gill, Rafik and Calum are invalid guardians, based on their "obvious" problems, as evidenced by their occupation and concomitant lifestyle. Acorna wants surgical corrections for her differences and the removal of her horn is imminent.

The miners are horrified by Glatt's denial of Acorna's alien status and insistence that their ward is a retarded, deformed human in need of specialised care, with a potential future as a menial worker in a sheltered workshop. They are joined by Judit (who was listening outside the door) and Glatt is temporarily put out of commission while Acorna's rescuers hurry to the surgical unit. Dr. Forelle has already rescinded the order for surgery.

Judit takes custody of the anaesthetised Acorna from the surgical team and the miners pretend to hold her hostage as they return to the Khedive. They offer to take Judit with them, but she elects to remain in her employment so that she can help her younger siblings, Mercy and Pal, escape child slavery on Kezdet, their home planet.

=== Late childhood ===
The Khedive's crew escape from Amalgamated, only to find that their ship is being claimed by the corporation as stolen. They determine to seek the assistance of Rafik's wily Uncle Hafiz Harakamian to exchange the Khedive's identity with a similar spaceship that crashed. Thus, the miners and their adopted daughter travel to Laboue, a planet known for its discretion and secrecy in such matters, taking with them the beacon exchanged with that of the dead ship.

Uncle Hafiz, an unscrupulous collector of rarities, is not to be trusted with Acorna's unusual background, so Rafik pretends to have converted to Neo-Hadithianism, a retrograde religious sect who veil their women and practice polygamy. While Gill pretends to be Rafik's business partner, an unbeliever, Acorna and Calum are represented as Rafik's wives, swathed in the hijab, voluminous white robes that make an excellent disguise. While grazing in Hafiz's garden, however, Acorna is surprised by Rafik and Hafiz, unable to cover her horn before Hafiz sees it.

The following morning, Acorna awakens before her foster fathers and returns to the garden, fascinated by the musical Singing Stones of Skarrness and attracts Hafiz's attention. He introduces her to the concept of betting odds when she reveals her mathematical understanding of fractions and is enchanted by her abilities.

Determined to acquire this rarity, Hafiz insists, with barely disguised threats, that Rafik divorce her, allowing Hafiz to marry her, as part of the business negotiations. This will provide a substantial discount on the transactions, which include re-registering the Khedive as the Uhuru, with appropriate records, converting the miners' shares in Amalgamated to Federation credits and re-supplying the ship. The miners pretend to agree to Hafiz's terms while planning their escape.

Once the economic manipulations are completed, Rafik "divorces" Acorna and a wedding banquet is embarked upon in anticipation of Hafiz's marriage to her. Hafiz provides iced madigari juice as a celebratory drink in deference to Rafik's Neo-Hadithian non-alcoholic principles. Before any of the miners imbibe in this beverage, Hafiz is called away in response to a commotion caused by Aminah, former nurse to his grown-up son, Tapha, who has returned, minus his ears, from an unsuccessful attempt to take over the southern half of the continent.

Acorna detects that the cups provided for them are doped and purifies the drugged juice. Rafik exchanges Calum's contaminated cup for Hafiz's and when his uncle returns, the tables are turned and Hafiz falls victim to his own plot. While he snores peacefully, Rafik removes the holographic skimmer key and port pass from amongst his uncle's robes so that they can return to their renamed spaceship.

=== The Uhuru ===
Having swapped their spaceship's beacon with that of another they found crashed into an asteroid, the crew come under the notice of Ed Minkus and Lieutenant Des Smirnoff, two "Guardians of the Peace", the law-enforcement agency on Kezdet, the Uhuru's new planet of registration. The backstory is that the miners had a negative interaction with these officers and Smirnoff holds a grudge. The former owner of the beacon was Sauvignon, a member of the illegal Child Labour League (CLL), an organisation trying to end child slavery on Kezdet.

Smirnoff and Minkus were the officers who shot Sauvignon down. Their assistant is Mercy Kendoro, secretly a member of the CLL who reports to Delszaki Li, a wealthy local philanthropist who funds the CLL. Li's personal assistant is Pal Kendoro, Judit's and Mercy's younger brother. Li sends Pal to investigate if Sauvignon is still alive, so the miners now have more people hunting them than Amalgamated Manufacturing and Hafiz Harakamian.

Meanwhile, back on Laboue, Tapha learns that Hafiz plans to disinherit him in favour of Rafik. He plans to resolve this problem by killing Rafik and sends Ioannis Georghios to entice the miners into a trap, but they are suspicious and elect to go to Greifen to mine iron ore instead. Posing as Farkas Hamisen, Tapha files a damages claim against the Uhuru, so the miners travel to Nered to sell their load of titanium.

While dining out on Nered, Tapha catches up with them and shoots Rafik. Acorna revives him with her horn, witnessed by Pal, who has tracked them there. When Li learns of Acorna's action, he identifies her as a ki-lin, legendary beings revered in Li's culture and asks Pal to bring the Uhuru and its crew to Kezdet. Judit, now working for Li, is pleased to discover that Acorna is still alive, as a report to Amalgamated reported the Khedive and its crew as dead, crashed on the asteroid.

=== Kezdet ===
Shopping for clothes for Acorna on Nered the miners are rescued from their pursuers, who have been tracking their credit account, by Pal, with assistance from the shop clerk. Pal joins them on the Uhuru and releases sleep gas to render the crew unconscious after they are underway to Kezdet. Li has the mineral rights to Kezdet's moons and wants the miners to set up lunar mining operations. On arrival, Judit invites Acorna and the miners to Li's mansion. She is astonished that in the year since she last saw them, Acorna has grown from a child into a tall young woman.

=== Anyag ===
Jana, Khetala (Kheti), Chiura and other children are slaves at the Anyag mine, kept near starvation and working long hours. Cowed and beaten, the children are afraid of 'Old Black', the mythological demon of 'Below' who makes children sick and the very real 'Piper', a wealthy man in league with the 'Didis', procuresses for Kezdet's brothels.

Didi Badini and the Piper buy Kheti (now who is too big to drag ore corves) and Chiura, a very pretty little girl of about four, from Siri Teku, the shift boss. Jana is crippled by the beating from Siri Teku for trying to save Chiura and loses the will to live.

=== Chiura's rescue ===
Waking early, Acorna decides to go for a run and ends up on the other side of the river in a run-down commercial district where she encounters Chiura, who has escaped from Didi Badini with Kheti's help, but been caught stealing food. Realising, too late, that she has brought no money, Acorna is handed over to the Guardians of the Peace and insists that they take Chiura with them to Delszaki Li, who Acorna claims as her guardian.

After Li has paid off the Guardians, Pal and Acorna slowly extract her history from Chiura and resolve to track down 'Mama Jana', who cared for Chiura in the 'bad place' before the Piper and Didi Badini bought her. Acorna is horrified to learn about the conditions bonded child labourers must endure and wonders what would have happened to her if Calum, Gill and Rafik had not adopted her.

Li has already revealed his plan to rescue all the children and use the lunar mining bases as educational care facilities for the freed slaves. The three miners have undertaken the contract to implement Architect Martin Dehoney's plans for the bases, but the Kezdet authorities are obstructing progress.

The search for Jana takes them to the Tondubh Glassworks, based on Chiura's description of the 'bad place'. They are accompanied by Nadhari Kando, Mr Li's formidable bodyguard. When they draw a blank, Pal rethinks the situation and they try Anyag mine. Disguised as a new Didi, Acorna buys Jana and heals Laxme of her persistent cough, promising to return for her as soon as there is somewhere to take all the freed children.

=== The Piper ===
Delszaki Li's development of the Maganos Moon Base stalls because of obstruction at a high government level on Kezdet. He decides to introduce Acorna into society, hoping that her come-out party might throw light on the situation. All the notables are invited to a glittering gathering and the Child Labour League members circulate among the guests. Khetala (rescued from Didi Badini's 'bonk-shop'), Jana and Chiura watch the guests' arrival from concealment and Jana recognises the Piper when he arrives.

The children are terrified, but nevertheless raise the alarm by telling Calum that they can identify the Piper. When Acorna is introduced to Baron Manjari, he plants a poisoned kiss on her hand which she quickly neutralises. Calum tells Acorna that the Piper is present and she tells Uncle Hafiz, who instructs Hassim, the butler, to seal the building. Mr. Li entices the baron to his study, where the children are ready to expose his identity, while Acorna pretends to be overcome by the poison.

Li's subsequent negotiations with the Piper, Baron Manjari, remove all official constraints to the Moon Base and 'Manjari Shipping would subsidise the lunar colony by providing free transport for all materials brought to the moon and all minerals mined there in the next five years' in exchange for their silence about the Piper's identity.

Manjari does not believe that the rescue of the slave children will succeed, especially since he thinks Acorna is dying, supported by mourning banners erected at the Li mansion the following day, but he has reckoned without his host and Acorna, accompanying the fleet of skimmers and medics collecting the bond-slaves. When his portside manager calls to tell him of the children awaiting transportation to Maganos, the baron, his wife and daughter come to investigate.

Baroness Ilsfa reveals that Kisla is not the baron's natural daughter and he kills his wife in a fit of rage, then turns the plasknife on himself, leaving Kisla instantly orphaned. The rescued children are pleased, rather than traumatised, by this event and the settlement of the Moon Base goes ahead, albeit now at Li's expense. Thus, the book concludes with Acorna having redeemed her vow to free the child bond-slaves of Kezdet.

== Characters ==
Anne McCaffrey and her collaborators have created both human and alien actors who illustrate the best and worst of social interactions. Many of the characters introduced in this novel recur in subsequent books, particularly the members of Acorna's adopted family. The following is not an exhaustive list, but highlights the major players in this story.

=== Acorna ===
Born to the fictional alien race, the Linyaari, Acorna is the beautiful heroine of the series. Gentle, intelligent, compassionate and charismatic, she has an inherent sense of justice that makes her the champion of the disenfranchised.

=== Alton Forelle ===
Dr. Alton Forelle works for Amalgamated Mining and Manufacturing as a psycholinguist. He wants to experiment on Acorna and write academic papers about her. His defining statement is 'If she is a sapient alien, speaking a language totally unrelated to any human tongue, whatever we can learn of that language will be of inestimable scientific value. We can't let individual concerns stand in the way of Science'.

=== Baron Commodore Manjari ===
A wealthy and influential shipping magnate of Kezdet, he is known in the underworld as the Piper. He is described as 'a pinch-faced little gray fellow' with 'very piercing eyes' of 'medium height [and a] spare build'. He speaks in an oddly dry, whispering voice. His name is used to terrorise child-slaves by hinting at his cruelty and depravity. The Child Labour League suspects that many of the mangled children's bodies found are his personal victims. Married to Ilsfa and the father of Kisla.

=== Baroness Ilsfa Manjari ===
Born into the 'Acultanias, descended from the First Families of Kezdet' and unhappily married to Commodore Manjari, the baroness consoles herself with food.

=== Calum Baird ===
One of Acorna's adoptive fathers, he is pilot and mathematician. Physically smallest of the three miners, Calum first meets Hafiz Harakamian disguised as Rafik's ugly senior wife, covered from head to toe in a synthsilk white hajib. His ethnicity is apparently Scottish, a popular theme for fictional engineers. In this first novel, Calum falls in love with Mercy Kendoro but will not act on his feelings until he has tried to reunite Acorna with her people.

=== Chiura ===
Pretty toddler girl acquired by Siri Teku at the Anyag mine on Kezdet and sold to Didi Badini for the Piper's immoral purposes. She has dark curly hair and is described as having 'chubby' legs, so it is to be surmised that she is recently orphaned. She is deeply attached to her 'Mama Jana', who cares for her when she is thrown into the nightmare of the mine environment.

=== Delszaki Li ===
Native of Kezdet, which was colonised by many humans of Hungarian descent, his father's line was of Chinese extraction. Multilinguial and well-educated, Li inherited his family fortune and is head of the Li Consortium. Afflicted with a degenerative disease, he lives in his mansion with a staff that includes the Kendoro siblings. He is a major player in the Child Labour League, dedicated to the elimination of child slavery on Kezdet.

=== Des Smirnoff ===
Lieutenant in the Kezdet Guardians of the Peace, Smirnoff is corrupt, vengeful and devious. He is also skilled at defusing tungston bombs and becomes a 'Hero of the Republic' for this feat after Tapha Harakamian's attempted assassination of Rafik.

=== Didi Badini ===
Brothel owner and one of the few Kezdetians who knows the true identity of the Piper, Badini buys Chiura and Khetala from Siri Teku. She has a plump face, cold eyes, soft, silky, curly hair, has her toenails painted and wears beautiful clothes. She wants to capture Acorna to sell her horn to the Piper and her body to Tapha Harakamian in his disguise as Farkis Hamisen.

=== Ed Minkus ===
Fellow Kezdet Guardian of the Peace, Minkus is Des Sminoff's workmate and sub-ordinate associate in Smirnoff's corrupt activities.

=== Eva Glatt ===
Dr. Eva Glatt is a member of the Testing, Therapy and Adjustment Department at Amalgamated Mining and Manufacturing's Base. She almost succeeds in having Acorna's horn removed as a 'deformity' before Judit helps the miners rescue the child.

=== "Gill" Giloglie ===
One of Acorna's adoptive fathers, Declan "Gill" Giloglie the Third is described as having 'Viking-ancestors', and is nominally Christian. His appearance is variously described as large, red-haired and straightforward in manner. Popular with children, Gill becomes the consort of Judit Kendoro and foster father to the children of the lunar mining base. One of his favourite epithets is acushla, a term derived from Irish, meaning 'darling'.

=== Hafik Harakamian ===
Hafik is Rafik's uncle on his mother's side, father of Tapha, and a leading citizen of Laboue, a secretive planet with minimal regulatory systems and no taxation. He is the head of House Harakamian, a galactically recognised mercantile empire.

=== Jana ===
One of the orphans of Kezdet, bonded to the Anyag mine in Siri Teku's day-shift gang, Jana, although a child herself, becomes foster mother to Chiura when the toddler is acquired by Siri Teku. She is one of the children who identify the Piper, an arch-villain of the Kezdet underworld.

=== Judit Kendoro ===
Oldest of the Kendoro siblings, Judit won a scholarship and escaped the barrios of Kezdet to attend university. She worked for Amalgamating Mining and Manufacturing before becoming Li's personal assistant and finally, married to Gill, becoming house-mother and education administrator on Maganos Moon Base. She is described as having a 'wrist-thick braid of dark hair'.

=== Khetala ===
Orphaned at eleven years of age, Khetala (Kheti) has more education than most of the Anyag children. She is raped by Siri Teku, then sold to Didi Badini, who plans to have Tapha 'break her in' to brothel work. When the character is introduced, she is 'two years older than Jana, broad-shouldered and black-browed' and 'unofficial leader of their gang'.

=== Lady Kisla Manjari ===
Adopted daughter of Baroness Ilsfa and Baron Commodore Manjari, Kisla was obtained by Ilsfa from a Didi in East Celtalan on Kezdet while the baron was on an extended business trip. She is anorexic and friendless, with a small fleet of personal space vehicles given to her by the baron in compensation for being denied a career as a pilot.

=== Laxmi ===
Child slave at Anyag, she has a cough which Acorna cures on her first visit to the mine. She is Siri Teku's best ore sorter.

=== Mercy Kendoro ===
The younger Kendoro sister, Mercy 'has an advanced degree in linear systems optimisation theory'. She worked as female assistant to Des Smirnoff and Ed Minkus at the Kezdet Guardians of the Peace office before becoming Li's personal assistant. She and Calum form an attachment.

=== Pal Kendoro ===
Youngest of the Kendoro siblings, he is introduced as Delszaki Li's personal assistant. He is attracted to Acorna and is the subject of her first crush on a member of the opposite sex.

=== Pedir ===
Skimmer taxi driver who allied himself with Acorna and assists the Child Labour League to free the child slaves on Kezdet, he is recognised by Li to be a 'source of much local knowledge and gossip'. He is the driver who transports Hafiz, on arriving in Celtelan on Kezdet, to the Li mansion.

=== Rafik Harakamian ===
One of Acorna's foster fathers, dark-haired and dark-eyed, Rafik is descended from Earth's Middle-Eastern people. He is tri-lingual, speaking Basic, Armenian and Arabic language. Son of Hafik Harakamian's favourite sister, Rafik is the negotiator and usually does the 'logical setting out of facts' when a decision must be reached. His character can be devious, but he is also an honourable man, when appropriate.

=== Siru Teku ===
Siru is a controller of a gang of bonded child labourers (effectively slaves) at the Anyag coal mine on Kezdet. Brutal, perverted and unscrupulous, he beats the children, starves them and apparently tales delight in their subjugation. He is a known associate of both Didi Badini and the Piper (pseudonym of Baron Commodore Manjari).

=== Tapha Harakamian ===
Son of Hafiz Harakamian by his 'deceased' wife Yasmin, Tapha is incompetent, perverted and stupid. Delegated by his father to 'take over the southern half of the continent [on Labue from] Yukata Batsu', Tapha is captured and his ears are sent to his father. When he is returned home, Hafiz decides to disinherit his son in favour of his nephew, Rafik. Tapha then makes unsuccessful attempts to assassinate Rafiz until his demise at the hands of Des Smirnoff when he tried to kill Rafiz with a tungsten bomb, a weapon of mass destruction.

== Themes ==
The Unicorn Girl explores mining, business ethics, corruption, child slavery and paedophilia in a postulated future where humans have colonised the galaxy. Some readers have found this disappointing as the book does not focus exclusively on the title character.
