= Elizabeth Ann Scarborough =

American novelist

- Born: March 23, 1947 (age 79); Kansas City, Kansas, U.S.
- Occupation: Writer
- Writing career
- Genres: Science fiction, fantasy
- Subjects: folklore/music, fairy tales, sociology, mythology, history, humor

Elizabeth Ann Scarborough (born March 23, 1947) is an American writer of science fiction and fantasy and Registered Nurse who lives in Port Townsend, Washington. She has published over 40 novels, as well as collaborating with Anne McCaffrey on multiple series.

== Biography ==
Elizabeth Ann Scarborough grew up in Kansas City, Kansas. She earned a RN from Bethany Hospital School of Nursing in 1968. She was a practicing nurse for well over a decade, including 5 years as an RN in the US Army, one year of which she served in Vietnam during the eponymous war. Her writing career began in 1982 with the publication of her first novel, following which she entered the University of Alaska, earning a BA Magna Cum Laude in 1987. She is still an active novelist publishing at least one novel in every year after 1986, except for 1990, 2011, 2013, and 2014 (in which she published short story collections instead). She now publishes the bulk of her independent work through Gypsy Shadow Publishers.

== Awards ==
Scarborough was granted a Nebula Award in 1989 for her novel The Healer's War.

== Works ==
=== Non-fiction ===
- "The Dragon Lady's Songs", from Dragonwriter, 2013
- "Nursing Our Wounds", from Health Progress, 2016

=== Collaborations with Anne McCaffrey ===
- The Acorna Series, 1999-2007
- Petaybee Series, 1993-2008
- The Barque Cats Series, 2009-2010

=== Argonia/Songs from the Seashell Archives Quintet ===
- Vol. 1: Song of Sorcery, 1982
- Vol. 2: The Unicorn Creed, 1983
- Vol. 3: Bronwyn's Bane, 1983
- Vol. 4: The Christening Quest, 1985
- Vol. 5: The Dragon, the Witch and the Railroad, 2015
- Vol. 6: The Redundant Dragons, 2019

=== Drastic Dragon series ===
- Vol. 1: The Drastic Dragon of Draco, Texas, 1986
- Vol. 2: The Goldcamp Vampire, 1987

=== The Songkiller Saga ===
- Vol. 1: Phantom Banjo, 1991
- Vol. 2: Picking the Ballad’s Bones, 1991
- Vol. 3: Strum Again?, 1992

=== Nothing Sacred series ===
- Vol. 1: Nothing Sacred, 1991
- Vol. 2: Last Refuge, 1992

=== Godmother series ===
- Vol. 1: The Godmother, 1994
- Vol. 2: The Godmother’s Apprentice, 1995
- Vol. 3: The Godmother’s Web, 1998

=== Cleopatra series ===
- Vol. 1: Channeling Cleopatra, 2002
- Vol. 2: Cleopatra 7.2, 2004

=== Spam the Cat series ===
- Vol. 1 Spam Vs the Vampire, 2011
- Vol. 2 Father Christmas or Spam the Cat's First Christmas
- Vol. 3 The Tour Bus of Doom or Spam and the Zombie Apocalyps-o

=== Standalone novels ===
- The Harem of Aman Akbar, 1984
- The Healer's War, 1988 (Nebula Award for Best Novel 1989), illustrated by Braldt Bralds
- Carol for Another Christmas, 1996
- The Lady in the Loch, 1998

=== Anthologies ===
- Space Opera, with Anne McCaffrey, 1996
- Warrior Princesses, with Martin H. Greenberg, 1998
- Past Lives, Present Tense, 1999
- Vampire Slayers: Stories of Those Who Dare to Take Back the Night, with Martin H. Greenberg, 1999

=== Collections ===
- "Shifty", 2013
- "Nine Tails O' Cats", 2011
- "Scarborough Fair and Other Stories", 2003
- "Introduction"
- "The Mummies of the Motorway", 2001
- "Final Vows", 1998
- "Whirlwinds", 1998
- "Worse Than the Curse", 2000
- "Boon Companion", 2002
- "Long Time Coming Home", with Rick Reaser, 2002
- "Mu Mao and the Court Oracle", 2001
- "Don’t Go Out in Holy Underwear or Victoria’s Secret or Space Panties!!!", 1996
- "The Invisible Woman’s Clever Disguise", 2000
- "A Rare Breed", 1995
- "Scarborough Fair", 1996

=== Other short fiction ===
- "Milk from a Maiden's Breast", 1987
- "Wolf From the Door", 1988
- "The Elephant In-Law", 1988
- "The Camelot connection", 1988
- "Bastet's Blessing", 1989
- "The Castle's Haunted Parking Lot", 1991
- "The Queen's Cat's Tale", 1991
- "The Dragon of Tollin", 1992
- "Candy's Wonder Cure", a Wonder Woman story, 1993
- "The Cat-Quest of Mu Mao the Magnificent", 1994
- "Jean-Pierre and the Gator-Maid", 1994
- "The Stone of War and the Nightingale's Egg", 1995
- "First Communion", 1995
- "Born Again", 1996
- "The Snake Charm
- "The Attack of the Avenging Virgins", 1998
- "Debriefing the Warrior/Princess", 1998
- "The Fatal Wager", 1998
- "Final Vows", 1998
- "Worse Than The Curse", 2000
- "The Mummies of the Motorway", 2001
- "Jewels Beyond Price", 2005
- "Spam and the Sasquatch", 2015
- "Spam, the Spooks, and the UPS Bandit" 2015
