= Margaret Ball (writer) =

American novelist

Margaret Elizabeth Ball
- Born: November 7, 1947 (age 78)
- Education: University of Texas at Austin (BA, PhD)
- Occupation: Novelist
- Writing career
- Pen name: Catherine Lyndell
- Genres: science fiction, fantasy, historical, romance
- Website: www.sf-encyclopedia.com/entry/ball_margaret

Margaret Elizabeth Ball (born November 7, 1947) is an American author of science fiction, fantasy, and historical novels. Under the pseudonym of Catherine Lyndell, she has also written romance. Ball has a B.A. in mathematics and a Ph.D. in linguistics from the University of Texas. A former Fulbright scholar and UCLA professor, she devotes her time to fabric arts and embeadery. Married with two children, she lives in Austin, Texas.

== Bibliography ==
=== Tamai Series ===
- Flameweaver (1991)
- Changeweaver (1993)

=== Acorna series (contributor) ===
- Acorna: The Unicorn Girl (1997) (with Anne McCaffrey)
- Acorna's Quest (1998) (with Anne McCaffrey)

=== Brainship series ===
- Partnership (1992) (with Anne McCaffrey)
- Brain Ships (omnibus) (2003) (with Mercedes Lackey and Anne McCaffrey)

=== Chicks in Chainmail series ===
- "Career Day" (1995) in Chicks in Chainmail
- Mathemagics: A Chicks in Chainmail Novel (1996)
- "Tales from the Slushpile" (1998) in Did You Say Chicks?!
- "Fun with Hieroglyphics" (2000) in The Chick is in the Mail

=== Applied Topology ===
- A Pocketful of Stars (Applied Topology Book 1) (2018)
- An Opening in the Air (Applied Topology Book 2) (2018)
- An Annoyance of Grackles (Applied Topology Book 3) (2018)
- A Tapestry of Fire (Applied Topology Book 4) (2018)
- A Creature of Smokeless Flame (Applied Topology Book 5) (2018)
- A Revolution of Rubies (Applied Topology Book 6) (2019)
- A Child of Magic (Applied Topology Book 7) (2019)

=== Other works ===
==== Novels ====
- The Shadow Gate (1990)
- A Bridge to the Sky (1990)
- No Earthly Sunne (1994)
- Lost in Translation (1995)
- Disappearing Act (2004)
- Duchess of Aquitaine (2007)

==== Short stories ====
Title	Date	Anthology / magazine	ISBN / issue
"Joyful All Ye Nations Rise"	1993	Christmas Forever	0-312-85576-1
"Sikander Khan"	1993	Betcha Can't Read Just One	0-441-24883-7
"Telling Human Stories"	1994	Hotel Andromeda	0-441-00010-X
"Totally Spaced Barbie"	1994	Amazing Stories	Winter 1994
"Hold Me Fast and Fear Not"	1995	Realms of Fantasy	April 1995
"Ballad of the Outer Life"	1995	Adventures in the Twilight Zone	0-88677-662-7
"Notes During a Time of Civil War"	1995	Women at War	0-312-85792-6
"La Curandera"	1996	The Shimmering Door and Sorceries	0-06-105342-2; 0-00-648226-0
"A Hole in the Sky"	1996	Space Opera	0-88677-714-3
"Coyote Woman"	1996	Realms of Fantasy	December 1996
"Twelve Gates to the City"	1998	Armageddon	0-671-87876-X
"Shell Game"	1999	Past Lives, Present Tense	0-441-00649-3, 0-441-00904-2
"Communications Problem"	2004	Cosmic Tales: Adventures in Sol System	0-7434-8832-6
