= Change of Command (novel) =

1999 novel by Elizabeth Moon

- Author: Elizabeth Moon
- Cover artist: Gary Ruddell
- Language: English
- Series: Familias Regnant
- Genre: Space opera/military science fiction
- Publisher: Baen Books
- Publication date: 1999
- Publication place: United States
- Media type: Print (hardcover, 1999; paperback, December 2000)
- Pages: 436 pages (December 2000 edition)
- ISBN: 0-671-31963-9 (December 2000 edition)
- OCLC: 45606433
- Preceded by: Rules of Engagement
- Followed by: Against the Odds

Change of Command is a science fiction novel by Elizabeth Moon, first published in 1999. It is set in her Familias Regnant fictional universe, and is the third novel in the informal Esmay Suiza trilogy.

== Plot summary ==
The title of Change of Command refers to two events that drive the plot and occur just before the story begins or very early on. The first is the assassination of Bunny, or Lord Thornbuckle. The attack is believed by most to have been engineered by the New Texas Godfearing Militia who had sworn to get revenge on Thornbuckle and the Familias Regnant in general for executing Our Texas's leaders, the Rangers (for what they did to Brun and other women in Rules of Engagement). The second is the change in command of the military prison on Stack Islands in Copper Mountain, from Iosep Tolin to Pilar Bacarion, a woman who had been very close to Admiral Lepescu but had managed to evade the purges sparked by Lepescu's manhunts in Hunting Party. She plots to effect still another change of command, of a good portion of Fleet and eventually the Familias.

A third possible event referenced by the title is the plot by the Benignity of the Compassionate Hand to undermine the expansionist capabilities of Fleet by arranging for the rejuvenation drugs being used on the master chiefs to be contaminated; "Project Retainer". With the help of Barin Serrano and a number of other junior officers and non-commissioned personnel, Fleet has just learned of the issue of important NCOs suffering from mental problems.

Lady Cecelia is on Rotterdam engaged in the Wherrin Trials (which she wins) when the news of the assassination comes in. As it is already too late to return to Rockhouse in time for the funeral, Cecelia stays, and participate in a curious conversation with an old but not liked acquaintance named Pedar, who insinuates that it was not the Our Texans who had killed Bunny, but rather that he had been killed because he "broke the rules" and so the Rejuvenants (the shadowy quasi-political faction which supports unlimited use of rejuvenation with all that that implies), and more specifically, Pedar, had him killed. After this conversation, Cecelia covertly leaves Rotterdam for Rockhouse Major. There she stiffens the spine of Bunny's widow, Miranda, and aids her and Brun by taking the twins fathered on Brun by the Texans, fostering them with Raffaele and Ron on their colony world Excet-24; while on the colony, Cecelia discovers that something has gone very wrong in the colonial system. Most colonies appear to have been swindled and exploited.

Miranda uses this breather to return to Sirialis—upon Bunny's death, his estate should have passed to his wife or his eldest son, Buttons. But his younger brother Harlis is masterminding a vigorous assault on the inheritance. Miranda suspects that Harlis has manipulated and falsified various records and intends to compare them against the full off-line backups she maintains in a remote portion of Sirialis.

Hobart Conselline (of the Consellines whose sub-family, the Morrellines, were responsible for the profiteering off inferior rejuvenation drugs in Winning Colors) successfully manipulates the emergency Council meeting called after the assassination to have himself appointed Speaker, buying off Harlis with the promise that the judges appointed will be favorable to Harlis's lawsuits. He pushes through a number of disastrous amendments and ill-considered appointments (such as the appointment of Pedar as Foreign Minister). The resistance his politics meet drive him to even more extreme measures. The worst, possibly, is Hobart's conviction that the mentally damaged NCOs were not suffering because of bad drugs manufactured by the Morrellines but rather that the research demonstrating that was all fabricated by Ageists (those opposed to rejuvenation) and that the real culprit was inbreeding in various Fleet clans like the Serranos. Pursuant to this conviction, he orders the vast majority of flag rank personnel to be relieved of their duties and remanded to Medical. One of the admirals so retired is Admiral Vida Serrano, who returns home. Killing time, she browses through the old family libraries, and discovers a very old book, purporting to be a children's book, which records exactly how the Family which had been the Serranos' patron came to be extinguished, root and branch: they had been betrayed by their ground soldiers on Altiplano. Esmay Suiza's ancestors, in other words. This has obvious repercussions on the prospective marriage between Barin and Esmay.

Not all is going poorly for Barin, however; he has gone broke paying for the refugees from Our Texas who had attached themselves to him, and is deeply relieved when the professor specializing in Texan history suggests that they be sent to Excet-24 where their skills and handicrafts are deeply needed by the colony and especially Ron and Raffaela.

The new commander of Three Stacks on Copper Mountain has not been idle during these events. Methlin Meharry's little brother was stationed there when Bacarion was appointed; Gelan Meharry realizes after a little research turns up Bacarion's connections to Lepescu that a mutiny is imminent (as Bacarion could have no other reason to seek appointment to a maximum-security prison) and that as Methlin Meharry's little brother, his days are numbered. The mutiny begins with a communications technician bribed to disable the satellite surveillance for a time. It is immediately followed with the attack on Gelan: a prisoner is reported missing and he is attacked while he examines the bottoms of the cliffs. Wearing a protective suit against the fierce elements, he survives the fall but is believed dead. He had stored a life raft and supplies against just such an eventuality in a lava tube—where he is met by Bacarion, who had correctly suspected that Gelan would fake his death. In the ensuing scuffle, Gelan uses the grapples and claws of his suit to kill Bacarion and escape with her corpse (to sow confusion if the lava tube is examined by the other mutineers).

Gelan is eventually rescued by a SAR air vehicle, but not before the RSS Bonar Tighe drops several LACs onto the prison and load up with mutineers and the convert prisoners; those prisoners who declined to join the mutiny are massacred. The LACs return to the Bonar Tighe and begin to take it over. The mutiny is successful, and the unsuspecting space-station is taken over. The vital weapons research laboratories and the entire system are now in danger. Gelan, a young lieutenant and a high-ranked scientist hurry over to the weapons labs and neutralize its commander who had been instructed by his fellow mutineers to preserve the installation and its contents intact. They cobble together an old-fashioned radio system, and luck out when an arriving Fleet vessel receives the message, takes it seriously, and manages to jump back out of the Copper Mountain system before being destroyed; it soon warns the rest of the Familias.

Back on Sirialis, Miranda has defeated Harlis for control of the family assets. One last enemy remains: Pedar, who had revealed to Cecelia his complicity or spearheading of Bunny's assassination, and who is foolishly attempting to woo Miranda. Pedar insists in fencing with the old and authentic weapons an armor. Unbeknownst to Pedar, Miranda had weakened the armor she predicted Pedar would use.

When they start, Miranda feigns slowness and weakness, and deliberately breaks the tip of her sword; revealing her full skill, she thrusts her blade into Pedar's brain, killing him just before Cecelia arrives. Everything arranged to look like a horrible accident, Miranda gets off scot-free, satisfied with her revenge. Cecelia is horrified by Miranda's casual killing.

For his actions and policies, the chairman of the Benignity orders Hobart Conselline assassinated. To have needed to resort to such a tactic against one over whom he has no authority means that the Chairman has failed in his duty to his extended family of the Benignity, and even as Hobart is beheaded by the appointed Swordmaster (who replaced his usual Swordmaster), so too does the Chairman perish—another change of command.

Esmay and Barin disregard their respective families' opposition to their engagement, and marry even as the mutiny begins raging beyond Copper Mountain and all is thrown into turmoil.

== Reception ==
Kirkus Reviews called it a "disappointing" entry in the "once-gripping" series. Jackie Cassada of Library Journal wrote: "Political intrigue, mutiny in space, and ideological battles of war and weapons lend variety to this fast-moving space opera set in the distant future."
