= Against the Odds (novel) =

2000 novel by Elizabeth Moon

- Author: Elizabeth Moon
- Cover artist: Gary Ruddell
- Language: English
- Series: Familias Regnant
- Genre: Space opera, Military science fiction
- Publisher: Baen Books
- Publication date: 2000
- Publication place: United States
- Media type: Print (hardback & paperback)
- Pages: 529 (paperback edition)
- ISBN: 978-0-671-31850-5
- OCLC: 48378993
- Preceded by: Change of Command
- Followed by: None

Against the Odds is a 2000 science fiction novel by American writer Elizabeth Moon, published by Baen Books. It is the seventh and final novel in her Familias Regnant series.

Unlike the preceding Heris Serrano and Esmay Suiza trilogies, the novel does not focus on a single protagonist. Instead, it shifts between multiple viewpoints to depict a period of political upheaval within the Familias Regnant and the rise of a new Speaker, serving as a conclusion to several overarching storylines from the earlier books.

== Plot ==
Picking up near the conclusion of Change of Command, loyalist personnel stranded in a weapons laboratory on the mutineer-occupied planet Copper Mountain successfully transmit a distress call to an escaping loyalist Fleet warship. With their own transport destroyed, the loyalists use deceptive radio transmissions to trick the mutineers into abandoning a vehicle, allowing them to escape and rendezvous with the disabled ship Bonar Tighe for rescue.

On the planet Rockhouse, Fleet officer Esmay Suiza reunites with Brun Meager and her father, General Casimir Suiza, who formally transfers Esmay's hereditary title of LandBride to her cousin Luci, freeing Esmay from planetary obligations.

Meanwhile, Admiral Arash Livadhi grows increasingly fearful that ongoing investigations into the mutiny will expose both his past association with the mutineer leader Lepescu and his secret blackmail by the Benignity, a rival interstellar power. Attempting to defect, Livadhi flees across Familias space in his cruiser. Esmay pursues him in her scout ship, Rascal, using sensor countermeasures provided by Koutsoudas to remain undetected until they reach the border of Benignity space, where she prepares to intercept an incoming Benignity vessel.

== Reception ==
Publishers Weekly wrote that while Moon's "description of a deeply layered political and military culture provides an engaging touchstone for the far-flung skirmishes taking place therein", there is a lack of a "similar attention to contextual details such as scenery, geography and dates", although readers will still "delight in the twisting, thorny adventure in the compelling continuation to this popular series." Kirkus Reviews wrote: "Brisk start, disappointing finish: a so-so installment."
