= Once a Hero (disambiguation) =

Once a Hero may refer to:

- Once a Hero, an ABC 1987 science fiction comedy television series
- Once a Hero (novel), a novel by Elizabeth Moon
- "Once a Hero" (NCIS), an episode of NCIS
- "Once a Hero" (Hercules: The Legendary Journeys), an episode of Hercules: The Legendary Journeys
- Once a Hero (film), a 1931 film directed by Fatty Arbuckle
- It Happened in Hollywood, a 1937 film with the working title Once a Hero
