= A Sporting Chance =

A Sporting Chance or Sporting Chance may refer to:

== Film ==
- A Sporting Chance (1919 Paramount film)
- A Sporting Chance (1919 Pathe film)
- A Sporting Chance (1945 film)
- Sporting Chance (film), a 1931 drama film directed and produced by Albert Herman

== Literature ==
- A Sporting Chance, a 1926 novel by Margaret Cameron
- A Sporting Chance: Unusual Methods of Hunting, a 1967 non-fiction book by Daniel P. Mannix
- Sporting Chance, a 1994 novel by Elizabeth Moon, the third installment of the Heris Serrano trilogy, part of The Serrano Legacy series
- A Sporting Chance, a 1996 novel by Andy Lane, the novelization of the episode from the television series Bugs

== Television ==
- "A Sporting Chance", Bratz season 2, episode 5 (2008)
- "A Sporting Chance", Bugs series 1, episode 9 (1995)
- "A Sporting Chance", Diabolik episode 10 (2000)
- "A Sporting Chance", Horizon (British) series 16, episode 16 (1980)
- "A Sporting Chance", My Hero series 4, episode 1 (2003)
- "A Sporting Chance", Sink or Swim series 3, episode 3 (1982)
- Sporting Chance (TV series), Australian TV series
- "Sporting Chance", Second Thoughts series 5, episode 6 (1994)
- "Sporting Chance", The Rifleman season 4, episode 18 (1962)
- "The Sporting Chance", The Saint season 2, episode 13 (1963)

== Other uses ==
- Sporting Chance Clinic
