= Hunting party =

Hunting Party or The Hunting Party may refer to:

- Hunting party, a group of people organized to hunt wild game
- Mixed hunting party, a group of hunting birds
- Political parties with a pro-hunting platform such as the French Hunting, Fishing, Nature, Tradition

== Film ==
- Hunting Party (1959 film), a 1959 West German drama film
- The Hunting Party (1971 film), a US–UK western film directed by Don Medford
- The Hunting Party (2007 film), a US black comedy film directed by Richard Shepard

== TV ==
- The Hunting Party (TV series), a 2025 NBC television series
- "Hunting Party" (Body of Proof), a 2011 episode from the TV series Body of Proof
- "The Hunting Party" (Lost), a 2006 episode from the TV series Lost
- "The Hunting Party" (Dead Zone), an episode from the TV series The Dead Zone

== Books ==
- Hunting Party (novel), a novel by Elizabeth Moon
- The Hunting Party (comics) (French: Partie de chasse), a graphic novel by Pierre Christin and Enki Bilal
- "The Hunting Party" (Judge Dredd story), a Judge Dredd story

== Music ==
- The Hunting Party (album), the sixth studio album by American rock band Linkin Park
  - The Hunting Party (live album), DVD to the sixth studio album by American rock band Linkin Park
