= Sporting Chance =

Book by Elizabeth Moon

- Author: Elizabeth Moon
- Cover artist: Gary Ruddell
- Language: English
- Series: Familias Regnant; informally, the Heris Serrano trilogy
- Genre: Space opera/military science fiction
- Publisher: Baen Books
- Publication date: September 1994
- Publication place: United States
- Media type: Print (paperback)
- Pages: 383 pp
- ISBN: 0-671-87619-8
- OCLC: 30991967
- Preceded by: Hunting Party
- Followed by: Winning Colors

Sporting Chance is a science fiction novel, written by Elizabeth Moon. Published in 1994, it is the second novel in the Familias Regnant fictional universe, and the second in the Heris Serrano trilogy. It follows on the heels of Hunting Party and is followed by Winning Colors.

== Plot summary ==
In the aftermath of Hunting Party, the Prince was found engaged in the highly illegal and immoral sport of man-hunting. In an attempt to cover this up, Lady Cecelia and Captain Heris Serrano are enlisted by the Crown into quietly returning the prince to the capital.

During the otherwise uneventful voyage, Ron notices something surprising: the Prince is far stupider than he should be as the cosseted and genengineered Registered Embryo he is, and considerably stupider than Ron remembered him being as a child. Clearly something is wrong, and poison is suggested.

On Rockhouse Major, Cecelia confronts the King. He blithely dismisses her warning. Later, he mentions her discovery to one of his ministers, who repeats it to his sister, Lorenza, who hates Cecelia for following her dreams and has always wanted to get revenge; she uses the possibility of Cecelia making the poisoning of the prince public as an excuse to finally carry it out. As a skilled poisoner, she is fully capable of the deed.

On the space station, Heris is having the yacht overhauled and redecorated, whilst her new ex-Fleet personnel are quietly engaged procuring military-grade equipment and installing it. Brigdis Sirkin, meanwhile, has induced her lover (Amalie Yrilan) into taking up a temporary environmental tech job while Serrano decides whether to hire her or not. Towards the end of the allotted month, the smugglers balked in Hunting Party attack the two when Sirkin refuses to become their agent on the Sweet Delight, and are revealed to be Benignity agents. Before the badly injured Sirkin is rescued by Oblo and Methlin Meharry, Yrilan is killed by a sonic weapon. No sooner had this mess been cleaned up and the ship turned over to Spacenhance's redecorator than horrible news arrives from the planet: Lady Cecelia has suffered a "massive stroke". Heris is skeptical of this diagnosis, as is Brun. They maneuver to link up and begin planning how to rescue Cecelia. Cecelia in the meantime has been occasionally drifting to consciousness, and for increasing periods of time. What she hears is sufficient to prove that she is being deliberately prevented from recovering, her visual sense deliberately impaired and even worse, that she had been poisoned.

Unfortunately for Cecelia, while she is not dead, she has been deemed sufficiently incapacitated that her will is being executed. In her will she had recently made a change to give the Sweet Delight to Heris, both because she was a good friend and because Heris had saved Cecelia from Admiral Lepescu on Sirialis in Hunting Party. Berenice, Cecelia's sister, had always envied her her yacht, and given the suspicious nature of Cecelia's stroke and the amendment to the will, decides to sue Heris for the yacht. With the yacht tied up in probate, Heris's options are limited. They are further limited when the King summons Heris to an audience, and quite firmly insists that she and her crew steal the Sweet Delight, and while avoiding arrest by the Fleet, discovery of their identity and also any attacks by the Benignity and their agents, take the stupid prince to the Guerini Republic to seek an antidote to the poison. Heris has little choice but to agree, and steals the yacht and busts out of the Rockhouse system at high speed.

Brun and Ron take advantage of the lowered scrutiny and security (since Heris has quite visibly left, and Lorenza's agents were expecting any threat to their imprisonment of Cecelia to come from her direction) to arrange for a bunch of rowdies in hot air balloons to "visit" the long-term care facility during a festival; Cecelia is then evacuated in Brun's balloon (Ronnie having previously prepared Cecelia and had the surveillance devices put on a loop). Immediately they take her off-planet and eventually to her stable on the planet Rotterdam, where the locals like or love her. From there they begin hiring medical experts to come treat her.

Heris' pickup of the prince goes badly when she proves unable to distinguish between the real prince and his clone double. The confusion is exacberated when Captain Arash Livadhi shows with a third prince whom he believes to be the real prince, but who is likewise indistinguishable. Otherwise, the trip goes smoothly, except for Sirkin, who keeps making careless mistakes and whose performance is otherwise deteriorating. As Lady Cecelia recovers and prepares to file for competency and thereby regain her estate, Brun works her way back to Rockhouse Major via low-level jobs aboard various commercial vessels; even with this ruse, she barely avoids Lorenza's hired assassins. She warns Ron and the others that Lorenza was the culprit and to be avoided.

While Cecelia is regaining control, Heris leaves two of the three princes to the tender mercies of the Guerini medical establishment and travels back to Rotterdam to see Cecelia. After a joyful reunion, Cecelia returns to her yacht, and thence to the Guerini Republic. During this second trip to the Republic, Sirkin makes one mistake too many, and is relieved of her duties by Heris, who now suspects her of being a Benignity agent. However, merely taking her off-duty soon appears to be insufficient when a course modification puts them almost on top of a Benignity space-fleet base. When bridge computers begin malfunctioning, Heris orders the relatively new crew-member Skoterin to break out the small arms in the Security lockers against whatever Sirkin might be planning. Cecelia is convinced that Skoterin and not Sirkin is the traitor, and breaks Sirkin out of her quarters. When they (Cecelia's aide, a prince, and Sirkin) try to intercept Skoterin before she opens the lockers, they fail and are ambushed. Skoterin explains that her plan as a Benignity agent was to get revenge on Heris for killing two family members and to skillfully have it all blamed on Sirkin. When he tries to stop her from shooting Sirkin, the prince is killed. Cecelia and Sirkin are only saved when Petris attacks Skoterin from behind.

The internal revolt quenched, all attention is turned to the attacking Benignity ships, now being harried by Livadhi's cruiser. Defeating two, they quickly beat a retreat to the Guerini. There Sirkin and Cecelia are treated with stunning success; Cecelia is rejuvenated to herself as she was at 40 years of age, restored in all senses and capacities.

Now cured, Cecelia's next task is to punish Lorenza. She travels to the Familias Grand Council, at which event Lorenza is sure to be. The prince's death (for Cecelia is sure that one of the three who sacrificed himself so heroically was the real prince) finally convinces the King that his policies have led to nothing but to disaster; his only course is to resign. Lorenza notices Cecelia's presence, hale and hearty and rejuvenated, and panics, fleeing wildly. She turns to the same therapist/Benignity agent who had arranged for Yrilan's death, seeking safe transportation away from the Familias; for her mistakes, the therapist gasses Lorenza to death.

== Reception ==
John C. Burnell of Dragon wrote that the novel's pacing and tension were "well up to Moon's solid standard." Norm Hartman of Space & Time praised Gary Ruddell's "excellent" cover design.
