= Sassinak =

1990 science fiction novel by Anne McCaffrey and Elizabeth Moon

- First edition
- Author: Anne McCaffrey and Elizabeth Moon
- Cover artist: Stephen Hickman
- Series: Ireta
- Genre: Science fiction
- Publisher: Baen Books
- Publication date: March 1990
- Publication place: United States
- Media type: Print (paperback original)
- Pages: 333 (first edition)
- ISBN: 0-671-69863-X
- OCLC: 23666386
- Preceded by: Dinosaur Planet Survivors
- Followed by: The Death of Sleep

Sassinak is a science fiction novel by American writers Anne McCaffrey and Elizabeth Moon, published by Baen Books in 1990. It is the first book in the Planet Pirates trilogy and continues Ireta series that McCaffrey initiated with Dinosaur Planet in 1978. McCaffrey wrote the second Planet Pirates book with Jody Lynn Nye and the third with Moon.

The novel features the personal battles that Sassinak must wage within herself and the determination she develops to rid the universe of the scourge of piracy. The four parts include her enslavement and schooling, her first assignment, her promotion and her first ship, and the discovery of the Dinosaur Planet and its survivors.

== Plot summary ==
=== Part one ===
Sassinak and her family live on a newly colonized world (called Myriad) and are celebrating the end of the production year when all the colonies goods will be exported to other worlds, but the carrier never comes, and instead the planet and its people are soon under attack by pirates. The colonists put up a futile defense against the pirates' superior firepower, numbers and skill at their task. Sassinak witnesses the death of both her parents and her two siblings before she is taken off planet to become a slave.

At the slave depot she is sold, but is counseled by another slave called Abe, who is ex-Fleet. He teaches her discipline and embeds a message in her mind that will only be remembered when she is confronted with a Fleet officer. She is sold once again when her skills have improved enough for her to work as a navigator on a ship. The ship that she is on is captured by Fleet and she is rescued, the embedded message comes out and Fleet is able to attack the slave depot and free all the slaves.

Abe adopts Sassinak and she begins her quest to go to the Academy, where all Fleet officers receive their training. After prep-school she enters the Academy and excels but is always conscious that she wants to hunt pirates when she gets her stars and her own ship. On her graduation night Abe takes her out for dinner, but Abe is killed. Sassinak suspects it is an assassination. She goes on her first deployment without any family, adopted or no and is an orphan once more.
