= Generation Warriors =

1991 novel by Anne McCaffrey

- First edition
- Author: Anne McCaffrey and Elizabeth Moon
- Cover artist: Stephen Hickman
- Series: Ireta
- Genre: Science fiction
- Publisher: Baen Books
- Publication date: March 1991
- Publication place: United States
- Media type: Print (paperback original)
- Pages: 345 (first edition)
- ISBN: 0-671-72041-4
- OCLC: 23137728
- Preceded by: The Death of Sleep

Generation Warriors is a science fiction novel by American writers Anne McCaffrey and Elizabeth Moon, published by Baen Books in 1991. It concludes the Planet Pirates trilogy (1990–1991), which McCaffrey wrote alternately with Moon and Jody Lynn Nye, and is the last book in the Ireta series that she initiated with Dinosaur Planet in 1978.

== Summary ==
The title character from the first book of the trilogy - Sassinak - teams up with the main character from the second - her great-great-great-grandmother Lunzie - to end the threat posed by planet pirates. The granddaughter is over a decade older than her ancestor because the latter went through several lengthy periods of stasis (known as cold sleep) leading to questions of who is the "more experienced" elder.
