= The Serrano Legacy =

Book series by Elizabeth Moon

- Hunting Party; Sporting Chance; Winning Colors; Once a Hero; Rules of Engagement; Change of Command; Against the Odds
- Author: Elizabeth Moon
- Country: United States
- Language: English
- Genre: Military science fiction; Space opera
- Publisher: Baen

The Serrano Legacy, also known as Familias Regnant, is a series of military science fiction / space opera books by Elizabeth Moon. The series includes seven books total (a trilogy and two spin-off duologies), published from 1993 to 2000, and portrays a society in the distant future where the Familias Regnant serves as the governing body for an area of the galaxy. The books feature female lead protagonists—daughters and aunts, following the story of an entire family, including unique family dynamics. The books "depict women in the military who have a greater aptitude for command than the military men in their lives". The universe of the books is also ethnically diverse.

== Description ==
After writing several fantasy novels, including those of the Paksenarrion series, Moon began writing science fiction, initially collaborating with Anne McCaffrey, and eventually moving on to The Serrano Legacy. A central theme of the books is that, through technology, wealthy people can live much longer. The consequences of this remain a focus through the series. "Wealth is key to identity within the books", Duncan Lawie notes.

According to Moon, in Locus:

What I'm pushing is to think about something from all sides. Don't answer the first thing that comes out. I don't have the answers; I have lots of questions. In my old SF adventure series The Serrano Legacy, a lot of it had to do with the effects of longevity. What would really happen if you had rejuvenation and people could live very long times? What would it do to the social structure, to economics, to politics? What would it do to the neighbors of the country that had that ability?

== Reception and analysis ==
George Mann considers the work space opera, also noting that Moon's time in the military grants the books "an edge of realism ... that is lacking in much military fiction by authors who have not themselves served in the armed forces". Mann favorably compares the feel of the series to older pulp fiction while noting she covers more serious topics as well.

Of the first three books, Duncan Lawie says the protagonists are "all tough, clever, and interesting and their characters drive the books in an organic way". He calls the characterization "deft" and story a page-turner, though he hoped for more depth.

Of the series in full, Jo Walton says the books "do a lot of things right", praising the adventures, the military aspects, and the background. She later says that the high number of points of view "tends to make the focus diffuse", ultimately concluding that the books are "fun". John Clute wrote that the series "was perhaps a little disappointing, though still entertaining". Maura Heaphy calls it "a stylish and imaginative space opera of the far future".

The protagonist of the first trilogy, Heris Serrano, has also been remarked upon for her middle age, unlike youthful protagonists of many similar works. In a positive review of the first omnibus, Liz Bourke found the varied depiction of older women "downright refreshing".

== Books ==
The series comprises seven novels, all published by Baen. These books have also been collected into omnibuses.

- Heris Serrano trilogy
1. Hunting Party (July 1993)
2. Sporting Chance (September 1994)
3. Winning Colors (August 1995)
- Esmay Suiza duology
1. Once a Hero (Hardcover ISBN 0-671-87769-0, March 1997)
2. Rules of Engagement (Hardcover ISBN 0-671-57777-8, December 1998)
- Suiza and Serrano duology
1. Change of Command (Hardcover ISBN 0-671-57840-5, December 1999)
2. Against the Odds (Hardcover ISBN 0-671-31961-2, December 2000)

=== Omnibuses ===
- Heris Serrano, 2002 (US)
  - Collecting Hunting Party, Sporting Chance and Winning Colors
- The Serrano Legacy: Omnibus One, 2006 (UK)
  - Also collecting Hunting Party, Sporting Chance and Winning Colors
- The Serrano Connection: Omnibus Two, 2007
- The Serrano Succession, 2008 (UK), 2009 (US)
