= Winning Colors =

Winning Colors may refer to:

- Winning Colors (horse) (1985 – 2008), one of three fillies to win the Kentucky Derby
- Winning Colors, a science fiction novel published in 1995 by Elizabeth Moon
