= Dinosaur Planet (novel) =

1978 novel by Anne McCaffrey

- First edition (UK)
- Author: Anne McCaffrey
- Cover artist: Melvyn Grant (UK); Darrell Sweet (US)
- Language: English
- Series: Ireta
- Genre: Science fiction
- Publisher: Orbit Books
- Publication date: 1978
- Publication place: United Kingdom
- Media type: Print (paperback)
- Pages: 189 (first edition)
- ISBN: 0-86007-948-1 (first)
- OCLC: 39493412 (Canada)
- Followed by: Dinosaur Planet Survivors

Dinosaur Planet is a science fiction novel by the American-Irish author Anne McCaffrey. It was a paperback original published in 1978, by Orbit Books (UK) and then by Del Rey Books (US), the fantasy & science fiction imprints of Futura Publications and Ballantine Books respectively.

A sequel followed in 1984, titled The Survivors (Dinosaur Planet II), or Dinosaur Planet Survivors in the US. Jointly they are sometimes called the Dinosaur Planet series or sub-series. They are set on a fictional planet named "Ireta" that some characters call the "dinosaur planet". They became the first two books of the Ireta series in 1990, when McCaffrey collaborated with Elizabeth Moon and Jody Lynn Nye to write three Planet Pirates novels with the same setting.

== Origins ==
McCaffrey had emigrated to Ireland in 1970, with the second Dragonriders of Pern book near completion and a contract for the third. That work stalled after she finished Dragonquest (the second) but the market for children and young adults eventually provided crucial opportunities. Futura Publications (London) signed her to write books about dinosaurs for children, published by its imprint Orbit Books.

== Plot summary ==
A survey team visits fictional planet Ireta to survey its mineral wealth. Several anomalies are discovered, including some decidedly large animals that resemble prehistoric beings from Earth's history and legend. Before all can be explained, the Heavyworlder "muscle people" mutiny after gaining a taste for flesh and blood.

The Death of Sleep is a prequel to this book, and the fourth section delivers the characters to Ireta, intersecting some of the same plot points.

== Ireta series ==
- Dinosaur Planet (1978)
- The Survivors (Dinosaur Planet II), or Dinosaur Planet Survivors (1984)
- Sassinak (March 1990), Anne McCaffrey and Elizabeth Moon
- The Death of Sleep (June 1990), Anne McCaffrey and Jody Lynn Nye
- Generation Warriors (1991), Anne McCaffrey and Elizabeth Moon

There have been omnibus editions of the two Dinosaur Planet novels as early as 1985 and of three Planet Pirates novels as early as 1993.
