= Once a Hero (novel) =

1997 book by Elizabeth Moon

- Author: Elizabeth Moon
- Cover artist: Gary Ruddell
- Language: English
- Series: Familias Regnant; informally, the Esmay Suiza trilogy
- Genre: Space opera/Military science fiction
- Publisher: Baen Books
- Publication date: 1997
- Publication place: United States
- Media type: Print (hardback & paperback)
- Pages: 400
- ISBN: 0-671-87871-9
- OCLC: 38888544
- Preceded by: Winning Colors
- Followed by: Rules of Engagement

Once a Hero is a science fiction novel by Elizabeth Moon. It is the first of the three books of the Esmay Suiza trilogy in Moon's fictional Familias Regnant universe, following the three of the Heris Serrano trilogy.

== Plot summary ==
Chronologically, Once a Hero directly follows Winning Colors, even overlapping partially, but the focus distinctly shifts to young Esmay Suiza, who came to prominence after successfully leading a mutiny against her traitorous captain and intervening to decisive effect in the Battle of Xavier (as Winning Colors records).

Suiza is not immediately praised and feted for her heroism, however, for her actions demand official scrutiny. Thorough and complete, neither the Board of Inquiry nor the court-martial find Suiza guilty of anything, and so she is allowed to take a vacation before her next assignment.

Back home on Altiplano, Esmay is honored with Altiplano's highest award, the Starmount, although she remains convinced that she was not really a hero, that it was blind luck. While talking with an old soldier who had served under her father (one of the four highest military commanders on Altiplano) and was a family friend, she learns that the nightmares and her dislike of command and horses were psychological trauma from when, as a child, she had ventured into a warzone seeking her father. She had been waylaid and molested by one of her father's subordinates; the family friend knew this sordid tale because he had been the one to kill that subordinate, whose politically connected father meant any trial was infeasible. He felt free to tell her since he assumed that Suiza's father's coverup had failed to convince Suiza that the memories were merely nightmares during an illness or fragments of her imagination. This revelation precipitates a break with her father.

Meanwhile, civilian contractors for the Fleet have agreed to carry out a job for the space-warriors of the Bloodhorde: they would take a Fleet contract to rekey the command sequences of various missiles, and when they were aboard the specified massive Deep Space Repair vessel, covertly disable its self-destruct mechanism. This job would pave the way for the Bloodhorde boarding team. It is this very same DSR, the Koskiusko ("Kos" for short) which Suiza is assigned to.

After catching a resupply vehicle to the Kos, Suiza is assigned to a Major Pitak in Hulls and Architecture; Pitak immediately begins running Esmay ragged with errands and learning everything she needs to know about spaceship structural design and how to repair and fix vessels. In her spare time, Suiza slowly begins assembling a circle of friends, especially one Ensign Barin Serrano (last seen in Winning Colors hand-delivering a message to Heris Serrano from Vida Serrano before the Battle of Xavier).

As the months pass by Suiza settles in; so do the traitorous civilian contractors who productively improve the hours by disabling the self-destruct without tripping the monitors. Inevitably, the Bloodhorde launches its attack, crippling the patrol ship Wraith. Wraith is repairable, but is incapable of further safe FTL jumps. So the Kos goes out to meet it, since it is in the neighborhood, although the danger of pulling the Kos out of its normal routes and so near Bloodhorde space is very real. Suiza is sent by Major Pitak to take pictures of the forward section of the hull to ascertain the full extent of the damage. Suiza discovers instead the first prong of the Bloodhorde plan: a massive mine was planted on Wraith, programmed to wait until Wraith was brought into one of the Kos's repair bays and then detonate; this would incapacitate the Kos and make it easy meat for the waiting Bloodhorde assault group. Thanks to Suiza's presence of mind, the mine is safely disarmed. But all is not well. The Bloodhorde's plan is remarkably subtle (for the Bloodhorde): though the first prong has been deflected, the second was yet to strike.

After the mine is disposed of, repairs continue in earnest on the Wraith. Forward of the mine, some 25 crew members are discovered knocked out by sleeping-gas and are taken into the hospital facilities. Despite their location, open to space, they are uniformly uninjured, and eventually scattered across the Kos to help out. One interacts with Suiza. His manner strikes her as drastically unlike that of a Fleet member, and more reminiscent of commandos she had known. After making inquiries as to their location (most had vanished), whether they were injured at all like they should have been, and whether any senior Wraith officers recognize them, it is concluded that Kos has been boarded by Bloodhorde commandos seeking to capture the DSR and massively upgrade the Bloodhorde's industrial infrastructure and especially its military construction capability, greatly increasing its killing power. The captain immediately orders everybody's identification checked against their DNA and fresh IDs issued. During the change-over, the Bloodhorde kidnaps Barin Serrano, taking him as a hostage.

With the Kos' FTL drive apparently broken and its self-destruct disabled, the higher-ups decide on a risky strategy of detaching the section of Kos containing most of the intruders, and ambushing the expected follow-up wave of Bloodhorde; while that wave was preoccupied boarding, they would attack the vessel and use it to either protect the Kos until its escorts returned with reinforcements or destroy it. During a meeting with Suiza to discuss how to suppress the commandos, the spoken-of commandos attack, cutting off most of the senior personnel with poison gas. They escape the cabin with the injured captain and link up with some personnel who had made it to the security lockers before the Bloodhorde. They conclude that to lead an effective resistance, they have to lead it from the T-1 arm of the Kos. But all the arms have been locked off from the core by the Bloodhorde. So, they decide to go EVA and go around. During the EVA excursions, the Kos is jumped through hyperspace.

Led by Suiza, the crew of T-1 determine to retake the Kos and ambush their ambushers. When the intruders relax their guard of the bridge, one of the bridge crew women risks her life to re-open the doors to the core (and by extension, enabling an assault on the bridge). The prepared security teams overcome the few commandos in the core and regain control easily - most of the commandos had gone to T-4 to eliminate the resistance there. The crew in T-4 had used their grace time profitably, arranging an elaborate drama for the benefit of the commandos, intended to convince them that they were fighting - and defeating - the ill-prepared armed resistance of the Familias crew. The drama lures them to the repair bay, where (elated by their success), they don spacesuits and sortie out to welcome their warship into the repair bay.

There it is trapped by an extremely strong adhesive. The two other warships dock without being trapped, and debark their crew in EVA suits. The robots used for painting vessels attack them, blinding and immobilizing them. The two still-mobile Bloodhorde ships are commandeered and the three remaining Bloodhorde are easily destroyed, and the day saved.

Barin Serrano is discovered alive, but much abused in mind and body. Suiza is no less discomfited by her nightmares and anxieties. She and Barin begin going to psychiatric care. Eventually Suiza begins to work through her phobia of sexual contact and assuming leadership. She transfers to "command track" and becomes intimate with Barin.
