= Remnant Population =

1996 science fiction novel by Elizabeth Moon

- Cover of first edition (hardcover)
- Author: Elizabeth Moon
- Language: English
- Genre: Science fiction
- Publisher: Baen Books
- Publication date: 1996
- Publication place: United States
- Media type: Print (hardback & paperback)
- Pages: 339 pp
- ISBN: 0-671-87718-6
- OCLC: 34029851
- Dewey Decimal: 813/.54 20
- LC Class: PS3563.O557 R46 1996

Remnant Population is a 1996 science fiction novel by American writer Elizabeth Moon. The protagonist, Ofelia, is an old woman who decides to remain behind on a colony world after the company who sent her there pulls out. It was nominated for the Hugo Award for Best Novel in 1997.

== Plot ==
The main character, Ofelia, lives on a fictional planet colonized by Sims Bancorp company. When the company evacuates the colony, Ofelia opts to stay behind, doubting she will live through cryogenic sleep, and not wanting to abandon the place where her family is buried.

Ofelia hides in the woods until the others leave the planet; no efforts are made to search for her due to her lack of value to the company. She lives alone in the village until a group of the planet's natural inhabitants make contact. She teaches them her language and technology, and they refer to her as a "Nest Guardian", a revered caretaker role.

When the existence of the species is discovered by other humans, scientists and military personnel arrive on the planet and come into conflict with Ofelia's perspective on how to interact with them. By the end of the novel, Ofelia's experience wins out and she lives out her life on the planet, and other elderly humans are brought to the planet to serve as Nest Guardians.

== Reception ==
Ofelia is "one of the rare elderly heroines in SF" who, throughout the course of the story, reaffirms her self-worth and value to society, contrary to typical portrayals of older female characters in the genre.
