= Speed of Dark =

2002 science fiction novel by Elizabeth Moon

- Cover of (paperback)
- Author: Elizabeth Moon
- Language: English
- Genre: Science fiction
- Publisher: Orbit Books
- Publication date: 2002
- Publication place: United States
- Media type: Print (hardback & paperback)
- ISBN: 1-84149-141-1
- OCLC: 50526588

Speed of Dark (released in some markets as The Speed of Dark) is a near-future science fiction novel by American author Elizabeth Moon. The story is told from the first person viewpoint of an autistic person. It won the Nebula Award for Best Novel in 2003, and was also an Arthur C. Clarke Award finalist.

== Plot summary ==
Lou Arrendale is a bioinformatics specialist who is autistic, and has made a good life for himself working in pattern recognition. A new manager at the firm where he works puts pressure on his department, where many autistic people work. Lou is pressured to undergo an experimental treatment that might "cure" his autism. Lou does not think he needs curing, but he risks losing his job and other accommodations the company has put in place for its autistic employees if he does not undergo it.

Lou struggles with the idea of going through this "treatment" for his autism while he pursues fencing with his "normal" friends and continues to go to work. His autistic friends, as well as himself, meet together after work and discuss what or what not to do.

== Reception ==
Speed of Dark was released to high praise from reviewers. SF Site stated that "At worst, Speed of Dark is a magnificent character study. At best, it's the most powerful book you'll read this year", and Infinity Plus described it as "one of those exceptionally rare novels that have the power to alter one's entire worldview, and reading it is a profoundly rewarding and enriching experience."

Jacek Dukaj reviewed it for Polish magazine Nowa Fantastyka.
