= Planet Pirates =

First omnibus edition Cover artist: Stephen Hickman

Planet Pirates is a science fiction trilogy written by Anne McCaffrey and two co-authors separately, Elizabeth Moon and Jody Lynn Nye. The three novels were published as paperback original by Baen Books in 1990 and 1991, although the Doubleday Science Fiction Book Club (SFBC) issued hardcover editions of each within several months. Baen published an 890-page omnibus trade paperback edition in 1993 entitled The Planet Pirates.

The trilogy is set in a fictional universe, and partly on its fictional planet Ireta, that McCaffrey created in the 1978 novel Dinosaur Planet, published by Orbit Books and Del Rey Books. A sequel Dinosaur Planet Survivors followed in 1984 and Doubleday SFBC issued a 376-page omnibus edition of the two as The Ireta Adventure in 1985. The Internet Speculative Fiction Database (ISFDB) catalogs all five novels as constituting the Ireta series.

== Series ==
- Sassinak (Baen Books, March 1990), by Anne McCaffrey and Elizabeth Moon
- The Death of Sleep (Baen, June 1990), McCaffrey and Jody Lynn Nye
- Generation Warriors (Baen, February 1991), McCaffrey and Moon

Omnibus edition: The Planet Pirates (Baen, October 1993), ISBN 0-671-72187-9; first hardcover edition, December 2000, ISBN 0-671-31962-0

== Plot overviews ==
- Sassinak – Sassinak was twelve when the raiders came and she became a slave girl, but she later escaped and became a fleet captain with a pirate-chasing ship of her own, but she has a few pirates.
- The Death of Sleep – Lunzie Mespil is a therapist who specializes in treating patients who have suffered from extended periods of cold sleep. When the ship transporting her to her duty station is struck by an asteroid, Lunzie finds herself in an escape pod, but she is not too worried; she will spend a month or two in cryogenic stasis awaiting inevitable rescue, and then proceed with her life. She however awakes up in the future she does not know, and Lunzie must make a new life for herself, but disaster seems to follow her like a shadow.
- Generation Warriors – Sassinak has made a career out of fighting the pirates that destroyed her home. Through determination, and a certain disregard for personal safety, she has gained the wholehearted respect of her crew, human and heavyworlder alike. Having found a new family in Fleet, she had long since abandoned her search for relatives, but in an unlikely turn of events, she may find not only the family she thought lost, but the key to the puzzle that has been her life's pursuit. In order to bring those involved to justice, she needs all her training and skill. After yet another long sleep, Lunzie finds herself called upon to help bring down a crime syndicate that has managed to remain hidden for more than a century, but to do so will require her to face her two greatest fears. Dupaynil thought himself clever. His assignment, to probe Sassinak's crew for a saboteur was certainly not beyond his ability, but he made a dreadful mistake in thinking that he was smarter than Sassinak. Everyone knows that heavyworlders have long been a part of piracy, and new evidence proves it, but without proof that someone else is pulling their strings, the heavyworlders will take the blame, and those in charge will just start over somewhere else. Fordeliton is Sassinak's executive officer and friend, but what Sassinak does not know yet is that Ford has depths of his own. Sassinak must unravel the connections in order to take down the Planet Pirates.
