= The Death of Sleep =

1990 novel by Anne McCaffrey

- First edition
- Author: Anne McCaffrey and Jody Lynn Nye
- Cover artist: Stephen Hickman
- Series: Ireta
- Genre: Science fiction
- Publisher: Baen Books
- Publication date: July 1990
- Publication place: United States
- Media type: Print (paperback original)
- Pages: 380 (first edition)
- ISBN: 0-671-69884-2
- OCLC: 21998854
- LC Class: CPB Box no. 620 vol. 11 (Copyright Paperback Collection)
- Preceded by: Sassinak
- Followed by: Generation Warriors

The Death of Sleep is a science fiction novel by American writers Anne McCaffrey and Jody Lynn Nye, published by Baen Books in 1990. It is the second book in the Planet Pirates trilogy and continues Ireta series that McCaffrey initiated with Dinosaur Planet in 1978. Elizabeth Moon and McCaffrey wrote the other two Planet Pirates books.

== Plot summary ==
Like its predecessor, The Death of Sleep is written in four parts. Each book centers on a new stage in the life of Sassinak's much removed relative, Dr. Lunzie Mespil, who leaves her daughter for what she thinks will be a relatively brief and lucrative job, but through various circumstances she suffers extended periods of cold sleep on several occasions, and finds herself thrown into a time different from her own, and is never able to meet her daughter again. Throughout her various experiences, Lunzie teams up with a changing cast of characters in order to bring down the planet pirates that plague the outer reaches of space.

The book begins as Lunzie sets off from Tau Ceti to her first assignment away from her daughter, on Descartes Mining Platform 6, which is only 12 years old. She tearfully leaves her teenage daughter behind, taking only a hologram of her and two duffel bags of clothes and other personal effects. Her ship leaves, with her as acting psychologist, and she speaks to a man who suffered from agoraphobia due to 12 years in cryo. She consoles him, but they are interrupted by the collision alarm: two asteroids are close to colliding with the ship, and they have no way to avoid them. The crew run for the lifeboats, but Lunzie is cut off from the rest of the ship, so must board hers alone. She contacts the other lifeboats, and is told that they will all hibernate till help arrives. She goes into stasis and the first part ends.

The story resumes with a miner from Descartes Platform 6, which is now 74 years old, as he is led by a Thek (a strange silicon-based, pyramidal lifeform) to a large asteroid, with a dated escape pod embedded in its surface. Lunzie is revived to discover that she has been unconscious for 62 years, making her daughter in her 70s. The rest of the crew were recovered long ago, and the man she had been counselling for agoraphobia did not even remember her.

She decides to move on with her life and relearn medicine due to the new techniques which she did not know, so she returns to her old university and starts again. She also falls in love and moves in with 'Tee', a technician who was also behind the times due to stasis and who was depressed due to his then advanced developments having been made obsolete in the 12 years he missed. Lunzie qualifies again, and receives an invitation from her now-extended family (she has great-grandchildren), along with her daughter, Fiona, who she thought was killed in an act of piracy. She takes a position on a space cruise liner, and sets of for Alpha Centauri, but a disaster strikes again when the ship's engines fail, and they are dragged into orbit around the nearby gas giant. The passengers escape in pods, leaving many of the crew and Lunzie herself. Lunzie's injured by a door, and is put into cold sleep once again.

When she wakes up 12 years have passed, and 'Tee' has spent most of it looking for her, signing up with the FSP fleet. Their reunion is marred by his having moved on from her, and started a new relationship, but they part ways as friends, and Lunzie finally gets to meet her even larger family on Alpha Centauri. They are delighted to meet her, but she finds them hide-bound and dull, living on a planet that is over populated and heavily polluted. The only one that she can truly relate to is Lorna, who is very similar to Fiona, and who shares their 'itchy feet'. Because of this, Lunzie gives her some of her 62 years worth of salary, to use to get off planet. Lunzie must now leave, but before she does, the captain of her rescuing ship invites her out to dinner, partly out of friendship, but also to use her as a cover for getting close to some of the 'planet pirates', groups of people who illegally colonise planets. He gets a call from his source, and goes to meet him, but one of the waiters attacks them; they win the fight, but the source is dead, and their cover blown.

The end of Part Four delivers the characters to planet Ireta and intersects with the events of Dinosaur Planet.
