= The Deed of Paksenarrion =

Epic fantasy saga by Elizabeth Moon

- Cover of both the paperback (PB) and hardcover (HC) editions.
- Author: Elizabeth Moon
- Cover artist: Keith Parkinson
- Language: English
- Genre: Fantasy
- Publisher: Baen Books
- Publication date: February 1992
- Publication place: United States
- Media type: Print (paperback)
- Pages: 1024 pp
- ISBN: 978-0-671-72104-6 (first edition); 978-0-7434-7160-2 (hardcover)
- OCLC: 25237376
- Dewey Decimal: 813/.54 22
- LC Class: PS3563.O557 D44 1992
- Preceded by: Surrender None
- Followed by: Liar's Oath

The Deed of Paksenarrion, The Legend of Paksenarrion or the Paksworld series is an epic fantasy saga by American author Elizabeth Moon. The Deed of Paksenarrion was originally published in three volumes in 1988 and 1989 and as a single trade edition of that name in 1992 by Baen. The three books included are Sheepfarmer's Daughter, Divided Allegiance, and Oath of Gold. Sheepfarmer's Daughter was awarded the Compton Crook Award by the Baltimore Science Fiction Society for the author's first fantasy novel.

A single-volume prequel about the life of Paksenarrion's guiding saint was published in 1990, followed by a sequel tying characters from both works together.

Paladin's Legacy, a sequel series set immediately after The Deed of Paksenarrion, was published in five volumes, released in 2010, 2011, 2012, 2013, and 2014 respectively.

== Publications ==
The original trilogy and the two Gird-related books were first published as mass-market paperbacks, before being collected as trade-paperback omnibus editions. The new series is being published in hardcover.

=== The Deed of Paksenarrion ===
- The Deed of Paksenarrion omnibus (February 1992), hardcover (October 2003)
1. Sheepfarmer's Daughter (ISBN 978-0-671-65416-0, June 1988)
2. Divided Allegiance (ISBN 978-0-671-69786-0, October 1988)
3. Oath of Gold (ISBN 978-0-671-69798-3, January 1989)

- "Those Who Walk in Darkness" (March 1990) – short story set during Oath of Gold, included in Deeds of Honor: Paksenarrion World Chronicles, as well as in the collections Lunar Activity and Phases

=== The Legacy of Gird ===
- The Legacy of Gird (published as A Legacy of Honour in the UK) omnibus (ISBN 978-0-671-87747-7, September 1996)
1. Surrender None (ISBN 978-0-671-69878-2, June 1990) – prequel to The Deed of Paksenarrion
2. Liar's Oath (ISBN 978-0-671-72117-6, May 1992) – sequel to both Surrender None and The Deed of Paksenarrion

=== Paladin's Legacy ===
1. Oath of Fealty (ISBN 978-0-345-50874-4, March 2010)
2. Kings of the North (ISBN 978-0-345-50875-1, March 2011)
3. Echoes of Betrayal (ISBN 978-0-345-50876-8, March 2012)
4. Limits of Power (ISBN 978-0-345-53306-7, June 2013)
5. Crown of Renewal (ISBN 978-0-356-50130-7, May 2014)

=== Paksenarrion World Chronicles ===
1. Deeds of Honor: Paksenarrion World Chronicles – eight stories set in the world of Paksenarrion ("Point of Honor"; "Falk's Oath"; "Cross Purposes"; "Torre's Ride"; "A Parrion of Cooking"; "Vardan's Tale"; "Those Who Walk in Darkness"; and "The Last Lesson") (ISBN 978-1-625-67114-1, June 2015)
2. Deeds of Youth: Paksenarrion World Chronicles II – seven stories set in the world of Paksenarrion ("A Bad Day at Duke's East"; "The Dun Mare's Grandchild"; "Dream’s Quarry"; "Gifts"; "First Blood"; "Mercenary's Honor"; and "Consequences") (ISBN 978-1-625-67637-5, July 2023)
3. Deeds of Wisdom: Paksenarrion World Chronicles III - six stories set in the world of Paksenarrion ("In the Valley of Death"; "My Princess"; "The Shepherd's Tale"; "Judgement"; "Final Honor"; "Destiny") (ISBN 978-1-62567-794-5, July 2025)

== Synopsis ==
The Deed of Paksenarrion was written as one long story, but published as three separate books.

The Deed of Paksenarrion revolves around the adult life of Paksenarrion Dorthansdotter, known as Paks, of Three Firs. It takes place in a fictional medieval world of kingdoms of humans, dwarves, gnomes, and elves.

The story begins by introducing Paks as a headstrong girl of 18, who leaves her home in Three Firs (fleeing a marriage arranged by her father) to join a mercenary company. Through her journeys and hardships, she comes to realize that she has been gifted as a paladin, if in a rather non-traditional way. Paksenarrion works, fights, and sacrifices herself until she can see the rightful king of Lyonya established over the opposition of evil forces, or gods, and evil humans.

== Film adaptation ==
As of December 2019 Warner Bros. owned the film rights to the books and planned on production of a live-action feature film.

== Reception and analysis ==
Suanna Davis discussed the series as one of the examples in her article on Representations of Rape in Speculative Fiction, in the context of Paksenarrion's backstory as survivor of an attempted rape from a superior officer as a new recruit, an event that happened in the first book of the series. Davis argues that when the event is mentioned later in the book, Paksenarrion's (and the author's) reference to the event as "it" rather than directly as "rape" represents an example of "silence from sexual assault survivors" on this topic, "possibly due to the cultural codes attached to the word".

Jennifer O'Sullivan discussed the series through the lenses of the feminist theory, concluding that "her work is still largely restricted by normative notions of gender and heteronormative contexts and ideals".
