= Hunting Party (novel) =

1993 novel by Elizabeth Moon

- Author: Elizabeth Moon
- Cover artist: Stephen Hickman
- Language: English
- Series: Familias Regnant; informally, the Heris Serrano trilogy
- Genre: Space opera / military science fiction
- Publisher: Baen Books
- Publication date: July 1993
- Publication place: United States
- Media type: Print (paperback)
- Pages: 364 pp (December 1995 paperback edition)
- ISBN: 0-671-72176-3 (Dec. 1995)
- OCLC: 28304042
- Preceded by: None
- Followed by: Sporting Chance

Hunting Party is a science fiction novel by Elizabeth Moon. It is the first novel set in her Familias Regnant fictional universe, and the first novel in the informal Heris Serrano (the main character) trilogy. It is followed by Sporting Chance and Winning Colors.

== Plot summary ==
Heris Serrano has recently left the Regular Space Service, which guards the Familias Regnant, rather than face a court-martial for saving the lives of her troops by deliberately disobeying the orders of her bloodthirsty superior, Admiral Lepescu, and capturing her objectives in a way other than what he specified.

Cashiered to civilian life, she must make a living as a captain. Her employment agency finds her a job as captain of the private yacht Sweet Delight for a rich Family member, Lady Cecelia. The Sweet Delight's previous captain, the sinister Captain Olin, incurred Cecelia's wrath by failing to promptly leave the capital (where Cecelia had been to attend the Grand Council of the Familias) so she could arrive on Sirialis, Lord Thornbuckle's private estate-planet, in time for the beginning of the fox hunting season; this delay saddled her with some obstreperous relatives who are in disgrace and are sent aboard her yacht as being a convenient mobile exile.

Heris discovers to her dismay that the same agency that had recommended her to Cecelia had also foisted an unrelieved stream of incompetent, degenerate, and outright criminal personnel on her ship, and that her new command was not merely overly luxurious and inefficient, it was an outright deathtrap. This point is driven home when Heris begins tracking down anomalies in the environmental systems and decides to inspect portions herself. The two environmental technicians she orders to accompany her in protective suits rush down to reach the scrubber before Heris. Heris's worst fears are realized when the two technicians blunder and unleash a cloud of deadly hydrogen sulfide; one dies, and the other is badly injured. On subsequent investigation, the life-support systems are found to be in imminent danger of collapse. Heris orders an emergency detour to a deep-space shipyard for repairs.

While in the shipyard, contraband data is discovered secreted in the scrubbers. Apparently Captain Olin, the dead Iklind, and presumably some of the others were using Cecelia's yacht to smuggle various goods for unknown parties.

Cecelia and Heris agree to a bet: if the repairs are completed on schedule, Heris will tutor Cecelia on the inner workings of her ship. If not, then Cecelia will teach Heris equestrianism using her personal mechanical horse.

In part because of the smuggling, Heris loses, but Cecelia does not hold her to it because of the legal interference, and insists that both sides pay up. The two discover a certain fondness for each other's pet subject, and slowly become fast friends.

Ron gets cross-wise of Heris when he calls her "disgusting" for putting him and his companions in what he considers to be inferior housing during their stay at the shipyard, and compounds the offense when he intrudes on the bridge (intending to apologize) during a tricky series of FTL jumps. The final straw occurs during an emergency drill; Ron and Odious George have as a prank repainted various cylinders used in drills and tampered with equipment to confuse and humiliate the captain.

Had the computer-generated drill been a little different, the cylinders would have formed a home-made bomb. Heris, with Cecelia's permission, locks Ron in his quarters, and through dexterous manipulation of the computerized fixtures and equipment tames Ron and slowly leads him to realize the errors of his ways; thereafter she begins to remedy his lax and deficient education. He is released when he has learned sufficient common sense.

Ron's newfound sensibility begins wearing off when the Sweet Delight reaches Sirialis and the others (Cecelia, Heris, Brun, Raffaele, and George) all begin enjoying the fox hunting while Ron is positively miserable and unskilled at riding to the hounds. George suggests that they take a secret jaunt to one of the vacation islands to simply get away from it all and annoy their relations by disappearing for a little while. Their escape goes well, until they attempt to set down at the Bandon complex of lodges and facilities, to refuel their flitter. Their authority is denied by the systems there, and while circling the field, their flitter is shot down.

Struggling to the island, they are greeted by former members of Heris's crew, who apparently are the designated prey of an illegal manhunt organized by the same Admiral Lepescu who had ruined Heris's crew. They had thought that the flitter was carrying some hunters, and so used their best weapon. They split the youngsters up into two groups, Raffaele with Brun and George with Ron, reasoning that divided there would be a better chance that at least one of them would survive long enough to be rescued.

The first night, Raffaele and Brun do well, acquiring a hunter's gear when that hunter killed the long-time survivor Petris had sent to look after them; the hunter overconfidently fell to the blade of his not-yet-dead victim. The next day, they find a well-hidden cave, and hunker down in it.

Ron and George do not do so swell. They improve the hours of the first night constructing a shoddy trap for hunters, and the next day Ron contracts a fever of some sort. George goes to get some water for Ron, but makes the mistake of drinking some before he notices the eerie silence of the creek: it had been poisoned by the hunters, who have begun to fear that the youngsters' absence would be noticed and have ceased to hunt fair. Ron feverishly attempts to drag George's body to safety, but George is captured by the hunters and is taken to Bandon lodge (while Ron manages to escape).

At the lodge, George talks his two guards into betraying Lepescu and into letting him send a message to Lord Thornbuckle and his militia. The message reaches Heris and Cecelia who have already organized a militia expedition - they had grown suspicious of their absence and various unauthorized shuttle flights down to the islands. When they storm Bandon, a traitor in the militia kills the two guards and nearly kills George.

All the hunters and victims were on the other island. Lepescu has realized that the jig was up, and begins methodically killing all the hunters and prey. His intent is to eliminate any witnesses and escape Sirialis.

Ron finds the girls just before one of the surviving hunters does. They get the drop on him and discover that the crown prince Gerel is part of Lepescu's cabal. They all set out to escape the island, and are ambushed by Lepescu, who offers the prince a choice: either kill his friends, allowing Lepescu to blackmail the prince, or he will die with them. His threat is backed up by a gas grenade with a dead man's switch. Heris and Cecelia have been following the prince's tracks; while delayed by killing the traitorous militia member, they come upon Lepescu in time for Heris to shoot him in the head and end his threat.

In the aftermath, Lepescu's cabal is dismantled. George recovers, and reunites with Brun and Ron, whose experience on the island have made them mature. Heris's former crew (the survivors, at least), decide not to return to the Fleet that betrayed them, and join the Sweet Delight, largely replacing the feckless former crew. The prince's participation is hushed up and he is confined aboard Cecelia's yacht until he returns to Rockhouse Major, there to answer to his father.

== Reception ==
Chris Hill of Vector called the main plot "fairly exciting and well-written" and some of the earlier scenes "well done". Norm Hartman of Space & Time opined that the novel's cover, designed by Stephen Hickman, was not among Hickman's best.
