= Winning Colors (novel) =

1995 book by Elizabeth Moon

- Author: Elizabeth Moon
- Cover artist: David Mattingly
- Language: English
- Series: Familias Regnant; informally, the Heris Serrano trilogy
- Genre: Space opera, military science fiction
- Publisher: Baen Books
- Publication date: August 1995
- Publication place: United States
- Media type: Print (hardback & paperback)
- ISBN: 0-671-87677-5
- OCLC: 32827770
- Preceded by: Sporting Chance
- Followed by: Once a Hero

Winning Colors is the third novel in the space opera, military science fiction Familias Regnant fictional universe written by Elizabeth Moon; it continues the plot centered on the adventures of captain Heris Serrano and the maturation of several wealthy Families' scions, which was begun in Hunting Party and continued in Sporting Chance.

== Plot summary ==
As the novel opens, things are in disarray in the Familias Regnant. Lord Kemtre's monarchy has fallen as a result of the events in Hunting Party and Sporting Chance which led to the revelation of the king's illegal use of biological clones as doubles; Lord Thornbuckle ("Bunny"; Brun's father) has taken the reins of government. Crises abound: a young and foolish Family member disappears on the fractious and restless world of Patchcock; there are concerns that the drug supply for curing aging is being adulterated by the Benignity; and other concerns that Brun is somehow in danger.

The Fleet, too, is restless and ill at ease; lurking and awaiting their chance is the Benignity of the Compassionate Hand (the "Black Scratch"), which has begun preparing an invasion.

The recently rejuvenated and cured Lady Cecelia de Marktos has decided to channel her recently acquired youthful energy into breeding horses, using the Sweet Delight (legally now Heris's as a result of a bequest in Cecelia's will which was executed whilst Cecelia was incapacitated, but de facto Cecelia's) to visit the frontier world of Xavier (which specializes in horses), with the added complication of Brun aboard working as a low-level apprentice technician.

Meanwhile, Ron and George are dispatched to the Guerini Republic. Ostensibly, they are there to get Ron away from his lover Raffaele, whose family refuses to countenance their marriage, and also to retrieve some information about Cecelia's treatment there. The true reason they are there is that, at the request of Bunny, they are taking some of the suspected adulterated rejuvenation drugs to be compared against the original known good Guerini products. While waiting on the test results, they accidentally run into the manumitted clones of the dead prince; to protect their secret, the two surviving clones take Ron and George prisoner, until the trailing Raffaele tracks them down. The clones need their help because the former king is also trying to track them down, as they are his only surviving sons, in a sense. Ron, George, and Raffaele help the clones assume new identities in exchange for them freeing Ron and George.

Freed, they learn that the Guerini had discovered that the rejuvenation drugs, supposedly of Guerini manufacture, were in reality being shoddily produced on Patchcock and fraudulently sold at the higher price.

Meanwhile, Heris has been quietly ferrying around Cecelia and a special guest: Livadhi's secret weapon, a remarkable scan technician named Koutsoudas.

A raider out of the anarchic and barbaric conglomerate known as Aethar's World visits Xavier and is blown into space dust by the Sweet Delight. Unfortunately, this display of martial expertise is insufficient to intimidate the Benignity observer, who reports back that Xavier has only minimal defenses; this report initiates the invasion, as Xavier is strategically situated.

Heris's desperate pleas for assistance against the coming strike to the local Fleet headquarters succeeds only in roping in a cruiser and two patrol boasts - all commanded by traitors in the pay of the Benignity. After Koutsoudas's spying on the command crew sorts out traitors from loyalists, Heris lays and executes her plan: she has invited aboard to dine with all of the senior officers, along with some of her "officers" (really her best hand-to-hand combat fighters). When closeted away with the traitors, she quickly kills them and takes over the cruiser using the hidden computer authority which her aunt Admiral Vida Serrano had had created specifically for her to use in such a situation. Heris bluffs her way into command of the cruiser (claiming that she was really still in Fleet, and that her court-martial had been arranged to serve as a plausible excuse for leaving Fleet when she went undercover), and of one patrol boat. The third patrol boat, the Despite, escapes and warns the incoming Benignity fleet of what awaits them.

Through a lot of luck (such as mechanical problems for the foe) and some excellent micro-jumping tactics by the defenders and the unexpected assistance of the Despite, whose crew had mutinied, and now captained by a jig named Esmay Suiza (who figures more prominently in the next three books), the invading fleet is destroyed and the system held until it is relieved by a Familias battle group under Admiral Serrano, who reveals to Heris that she had been deliberately maneuvering and aiding Heris to use her as a lightning rod to flush out traitors and blunt Benignity incursions. Now imbued with Fleet imprimatur, Heris travels with Cecelia to Patchcock, where together they help an aunt of the Family concerned kick her felonious brothers out of corporate control, and rescue the youngsters, all the while defeating the Benignity-encouraged terrorists who had killed the young Family member.

At the end, Brun decides to take Fleet training; George begins following after his father in law school; Raffaele and Ron quasi-elope to a frontier world colony to build a life of their own; Heris and her crew rejoin Fleet, while Heris finally is reconciled with her parents over their betrayal of her during her court-martial, and Cecelia decides to captain a new vessel on her own while continuing to raise horses.

== Reception ==
Starlog called it a "fine, rousing piece of space opera" and a "prize worth taking home." Norm Hartman of Space & Time praised the "superb" cover art and "highly recommended" the novel.
