= Dinosaur Planet Survivors =

1984 novel by Anne McCaffrey

Survivors: Dinosaur Planet II (UK) Dinosaur Planet Survivors (US)
- Sweet cover of early US editions
- Author: Anne McCaffrey
- Cover artist: Darrell Sweet (US)
- Language: English
- Series: Ireta
- Genre: Science fiction
- Publisher: Orbit Books (UK); Del Rey Books (US)
- Publication date: 1984
- Publication place: United Kingdom; United States
- Media type: Print (paperback)
- Preceded by: Dinosaur Planet
- Followed by: Sassinak

Dinosaur Planet Survivors or Survivors: Dinosaur Planet II is a 1984 science fiction novel by American writer Anne McCaffrey. It is the sequel to Dinosaur Planet (1978) and the second book in the Ireta series.

In 1985 the first two books were issued in one omnibus edition, The Ireta Adventure. McCaffrey and co-authors continued the series in 1990 and 1991 with three books sometimes called the Planet Pirates trilogy or series.

== Summary ==
Dinosaur Planet featured the survey of planet Ireta for its mineral wealth. Several mysteries unfolded whose resolution was interrupted by a Heavyworlder mutiny.

After 43 years, survivors of the mutiny are wakened from cold sleep. Their emergency message has been decoded by a Thek who asks questions but not about the mutiny. They tell him about a buried beacon they found, and he immediately leaves without helping them. Forced to survive on their own, they discover that the mutineers have built a settlement and landing grid that could only be used to colonize a planet, in this case, illegally. Several Thek arrive and seize control for their own reasons.

== Reception ==
Dave Langford reviewed The Survivors: Dinosaur Planet II for White Dwarf #62. The reviewer said that the novel is a 'straight' SF adventure and that McCaffrey never seems interested in it, unlike in her romantic SF/fantasy titles with their dragons and singers. He called her writing "slipshod".

== Reviews ==
- Review by Joseph Nicholas (1985) in Paperback Inferno, #53
- Review by Hal W. Hall (1985) in Fantasy Review, April 1985
- Review by Thomas A. Easton [as by Tom Easton] (1985) in Analog Science Fiction and Fact, May 1985
