= Jody Lynn Nye =

American science fiction writer (born 1957)

- Nye at Dragon Con in 2026
- Born: 1957 (age 68–69)
- Occupation: Writer
- Writing career
- Genre: Science fiction

Jody Lynn Nye (born 1957) is an American science fiction writer. She is the author or co-author of approximately forty published novels and more than 100 short stories. She has specialized in science fiction or fantasy action novels and humor. Her humorous series range from contemporary fantasy (The Magic Touch and Mythology 101) to military science fiction (Strong Arm Tactics and a new series beginning with View from the Imperium). About one-third of her novels are collaborations, either as a co-author or as the author of a sequel. She has been an instructor of the Fantasy Writing Workshop at Columbia College Chicago (2007) and she teaches the annual Science Fiction Writing Workshop at DragonCon.

Nye began collaborating with Robert Lynn Asprin on the MythAdventures series in 2003 with the publication of the collection Myth-told Tales and the novel Myth Alliances. Since Asprin's death in 2008 she has continued that humorous fantasy series and she is now also writing sequels to his Dragons, or Griffen McCandles, contemporary fantasy series.

In 2008 she donated her archive to the department of Rare Books and Special Collections at Northern Illinois University Libraries.

== Career ==
Born 1957 in Chicago, Illinois, Nye says that she "always told stories" to her younger brothers, cousins, and friends, and as a junior camp counselor. Her first published writings were technical articles on broadcasting in the magazine "Video Action" during the 1980s. She first wrote fiction for the "Ellery Queen Mystery Magazine game" and the Role-Aids line of game supplements published by Mayfair Games.

Late in the eighties Nye wrote six companion books for the Dragonriders of Pern series by Anne McCaffrey and the Magic of Xanth series by Piers Anthony. The first four were "branching-path" gamebooks in the Crossroads Adventure series, two set on Pern and two in Xanth. Then simultaneously November 1989, Ballantine Books published The Dragonlover's Guide to Pern by Nye with McCaffrey and Avon Books published Piers Anthony's Visual Guide to Xanth by Nye and Anthony. Todd Cameron Hamilton and James Clouse were the illustrators for both Guides, as Hamilton had been for Roger Zelazny's Visual Guide to Amber published by Avon one year earlier.

For the Pern guide, Nye explained in its introduction, her team (without Clouse) had visited McCaffrey two years earlier, for ten days during October 1987. In the living room Nye, editor Bill Fawcett (Nye's husband), illustrator Hamilton, and McCaffrey's son Todd Johnson discussed Pern with its creator and Hamilton sketched under her direction. They produced "a companion volume to her work, intended to help you visualize the setting and background for her chronicles."

Before The Dragonlover's Guide was finished, McCaffrey and Nye were working together on a novel, presumably The Death of Sleep (1990) in the Planet Pirates trilogy. In the early 1990s they collaborated in three series based on McCaffrey stories from the 1960s and 1970s. Meanwhile, McCaffrey completed five more Pern books, after which they revised The Dragonlover's Guide.

Late in the 1990s Nye began work with Robert Asprin to extend the Myth Adventures series he had started in 1978. After his 2008 death she continued to write books they had planned. Meanwhile, three of Nye's book series were "adrift" since Meisha Merlin Publishing went out of business in 2007.

Among other projects, Nye is continuing to write the Myth Adventures series and her military SF/humor series begun with View from the Imperium (2011).

== Works ==
=== Series ===
- Mythology
1. Mythology 101 (1990)
2. Mythology Abroad (1991)
3. Higher Mythology (1993)
4. Advanced Mythology (2001)

- Applied Mythology (2000) – omnibus edition of books 1–3

- MythAdventures
  - Myth-told Tales (2003), by Robert Lynn Asprin and Nye
  - Myth Alliances (2003), Asprin and Nye
  - Myth-taken Identity (2004), Asprin and Nye
  - Class Dis-Mythed (2005), Asprin and Nye
  - Myth-Gotten Gains (2006), Asprin and Nye
  - Myth-Chief (2008), Asprin and Nye
  - Myth-Fortunes (2011), Asprin and Nye
  - Myth-Quoted (2012) (Advertised as Robert Asprin's Myth-Quoted but authored by Nye alone.)
  - Myth-Fits (2016) (Advertised as Robert Asprin's Myth-Fits but authored by Nye alone.)

Asprin alone wrote 12 novels in the MythAdventures series that were published from 1978 to 2002.

- Imperium (or Lord Thomas Kinago)
1. View from the Imperium (2011)
2. Fortunes of the Imperium (September 2014)
3. Rhythm of the Imperium (November, 2015)
- Dreamland
1. Waking in Dreamland (1998)
2. School of Light (1999)
3. The Grand Tour (2000)
- Ireta (or Dinosaur Planet; or Planet Pirates)
  - The Death of Sleep (1990), by Anne McCaffrey and Nye
    - The Planet Pirates (1993), McCaffrey, Elizabeth Moon and Nye – omnibus edition of the 3-volume subseries

McCaffrey alone wrote two Dinosaur Planet novels that were published in 1978 and 1984. She and Elizabeth Moon inaugurated the Planet Pirates subseries in a novel that was published a few months before McCaffrey and Nye's.

- Doona
  - Crisis on Doona (1992), McCaffrey and Nye
  - Treaty at Doona (1994), McCaffrey and Nye; also titled Treaty Planet

McCaffrey alone wrote one Doona novel that was published in 1969.

- Taylor's Ark
1. Taylor's Ark (1993)
2. Medicine Show (1994)
3. The Lady and the Tiger (2003)
- The Ship Who Sang (or Brain and Brawn Ship)
  - The Ship Who Won (1994), McCaffrey and Nye
  - The Ship Errant (1996)
    - The Ship Who Saved the Worlds (2003), McCaffrey and Nye – omnibus comprising The Ship who Won and The Ship Errant

McCaffrey alone wrote The Ship Who Sang, a collection published in 1969. She wrote three Ship novels in collaboration with three different women that were published in 1992 and 1993.

- Dragons, or Griffen McCandles
1. Dragons Deal (2010), by Robert Lynn Asprin and Nye
2. Dragons Run (2013)

Asprin alone wrote two novels in the Griffen McCandles series, published 2008 and 2009.

- Crossroads Adventure game books (copyright Bill Fawcett and Associates)
  - Dragonharper (Tor Books, Aug 1987), illus. Todd Cameron Hamilton – set in the world of Pern
  - Encyclopedia of Xanth (1987) – set in the world of Xanth
  - Dragonfire (Tor, Jul 1988), illus. Todd Cameron Hamilton – set in the world of Pern
  - Ghost of a Chance (1988) – set in the world of Xanth

Anne McCaffrey inaugurated the long-running Pern series in 1967; Piers Anthony the long-running Xanth series in 1977. ISFDB catalogs the four Crossroads Adventures as novels, the two Guides as reference books, and all six as contributions to the Pern and Xanth series.

=== Novels ===
- The Magic Touch (1996)
- License Invoked (2001), by Robert Lynn Asprin and Nye
- Strong-Arm Tactics (2005)
- An Unexpected Apprentice (2007)
- A Forthcoming Wizard (2009)

=== Eric Flint's 1632 series ===
- 1635: The Weaver's Code (October 2024) 978-1982193669 with Eric Flint
  - An Exchange of Favours (short story) in the online magazine 1632 & Beyond, Issue #001, September 2023

=== Anthologies (as editor) ===
- Don't Forget Your Spacesuit, Dear (1996); (includes the short story What's the Magic Word?)

=== Others ===
- The Dragonlover's Guide to Pern (Ballantine, 1989), with Anne McCaffrey. Illustrated by Todd Cameron Hamilton and James Clouse. ISBN 0-345-35424-9. xi + 178 pages. — Pern geography, society, flora, fauna, etc., including information not in the previously published fiction
- The Dragonlover's Guide to Pern, second edition (Ballantine, 1997). ISBN 0-345-41274-5. xi + 260 pages.
- Piers Anthony's Visual Guide to Xanth (Harper, 1989), with Piers Anthony. Illustrated by Todd Cameron Hamilton and James Clouse. ISBN 0-380-75749-4

=== Short stories in anthologies ===
- The Fleet, "Bolthole", Ace Books (1988)
- The Fleet II: Counterattack, "Lab Rats", Ace (1988)
- The Fleet III: Breakthrough, "Crossing the Line", Ace (1989)
- The Fleet IV: Sworn Allies, "Full Circle", Ace (1990)
- The Fleet V: Total War "Change Partners and Dance", Ace (1990)
- The Fleet VI: Crisis, "The Mosquito", Ace (1991)
- The War Years I: Far Stars War, "Volunteers", New American Library (1990)
- The War Years II: Siege of Arista, "Unreality", NAL (1991)
- The War Years III: Jupiter War, "Gold-digging", NAL (1991)
- The Crafters, "The Seeing Stone", Ace (1991)
- The Crafters II: Blessings & Curses, "Miss Crafter's School For Girls", Ace (1992)
- Halflings, Hobbits, Wee Folk and Warrows; "Moon Shadows", Warner Books (1991)
- Alternate Presidents edited by Mike Resnick, "The Father of His Country", TOR Books (1992)
- Space Cats, "Well Worth the Money", Baen Books (1992)
- Battlestation, "Star Light", Ace (1992)
- Battlestation II, "Shooting Star", Ace (1993)
- The Gods of War, "Order in Heaven", Baen (1992)
- More Whatdunits, "Way Out" (by Bill Fawcett and Nye), TOR (1993)
- Quest to Riverworld, "If the King Like Not the Comedy", Warner (1993)
- Alien Pregnant By Elvis! "Psychic Bats 1000 for Accuracy", DAW (1994)
- Dragon’s Eye, "The Stuff of Legends", Baen (1994)
- Deals With The Devil, "The Party of the First Part", DAW (1994)
- Elric, Tales of the White Wolf, "The White Child", White Wolf Publishing (1994)
- Superheroes, "Theme Music Man", Ace (1995)
- Excalibur, "Sword Practice"—Warner Aspect (1995)
- Chicks in Chainmail, "The Growling"—Baen (Sept 1995)
- The Day The Magic Stopped, "Flicker"—Baen (Oct 1995)
- Fantastic Alice, "Muchness"—Ace (December 1995)
- Dante’s Disciples, "The Bridge on the River Styx"—White Wolf (1996)
- Lammas Night, "Sunflower"—Baen (February 1996)
- Otherwere, "What? And Give Up Show Business?"—Ace (1996)
- Future Net, "Souvenirs and Photographs"—DAW (1996)
- Many Faces of Fantasy, "Sidhe Who Must Be Obeyed" -- World Fantasy Convention (Oct 1996)
- Space Opera, "Calling Them Home"—DAW (1996)
- Elf Fantastic, "The Dancing Ring"—DAW (1997)
- First Contact, "Take Me to Your Leader"—DAW (1997)
- Acorna, "Pony Girl"—BIG Entertainment (1997)
- Zodiac Fantastic, "The Billion-Year Boys' Club" – DAW (1997)
- Wizard Fantastic, "Bird Bones"—DAW (1997)
- Urban Nightmares, "The Bicycle Messenger From Hell"—Baen (1997)
- Did You Say ‘Chicks’?, "The Old Fire" – Baen (1998)
- Alternate Generals, "Queen of the Amazons" – Baen (1998)
- The Quintessential World of Darkness, "The Muse" -- HarperCollins (1998)
- Mob Magic, "Power Corrupts" – DAW (1998)
- Tails From the Pet Shop, "A Cat's Chance" – 11th Hour Productions (1999)
- Twice Upon a Time, "Spinning A Yarn" – DAW (1999)
- Chicks and Chained Males, "Don’t Break the Chain!" – Baen (1999)
- Stardates, "The Stars in Their Courses" – Dreams-Unlimited.com (Dec 1999)
- Flights of Fantasy, "Eagle's Eye" – DAW (Jan 2000)
- Perchance to Dream, "The Piper" – DAW (2000)
- Daughter of Dangerous Dames, "Riddle of the Sphinx" – 11th Hour (May 2000)
- Such a Pretty Face, "Casting Against Type" – Meisha Merlin Publishing (Jun 2000)
- 100 Crafty Little Cat Crimes, "Land Rush" – Barnes & Noble (2000)
- Guardian Angels, "Desperation Gulch" – Cumberland House (2000)
- Warrior Fantastic, "Conscript" – DAW (2000)
- Blood and Donuts, "The Haunted Patrol Car" – 11th Hour (2001)
- Murder Most Romantic, "Night Hawks" – Cumberland (2001)
- Conjuration 2001 program book, "Shore Excursion" (Jun 2001)
- The Mutant Files, "Rite of Passage" – DAW (2001)
- Past Imperfect, "Theory of Relativity" – DAW(2001)
- Creature Fantastic, "Father Noe’s Bestiary" – DAW (2001)
- Dracula’s London, "Everything to Order" – Ace (2001)
- Oceans of Space, "Pyrats" – DAW (2001)
- Xena, Warrior Princess, "As Fate Would Have It" – DAW (2001)
- Silicon Dreams, "Sacrifices" – DAW (2001)
- Constellation of Cats, "Purr Power" – DAW (2002)
- Heaven and Hell, "The Fiber of Being" – Speculation Press (2002)
- Something M.Y.T.H., Inc. "M.Y.T.H., Inc. Instructions" – Meisha Merlin (2002)
- Turning Points (Thieves’ World 2K I), "Doing the Gods' Work" – TOR (2003)
- Vengeance Fantastic, "Even Tempo" – DAW (2002)
- Pharaoh Fantastic, "The Voice of Authority" – DAW (2002)
- Familiars Fantastic, "And So, Ad Infinitum" – DAW (2002)
- The Repentant, "The Salem Trial" – DAW (Oct 2003)
- Low Port, "Bottom of the Food Chain" – Meisha Merlin (2003)
- The Sorcerer’s Academy, "Field Trip" – DAW (Sep 2003)
- The Magic Shop, "For Whom the Bell Tolled" – DAW (2004)
- Little Red Riding Hood in the Big Bad City, "Keeping It Real" – DAW (2004)
- Rotten Relations, "Cuckoo’s Egg" – DAW (2004)
- Turn the Other Chick, "Defender of the Small" – Baen (2004)
- Masters of Fantasy, "Mything in Dreamland" (by Asprin and Nye) – Baen (2004)
- Enemies of Fortune (Thieves’ World 2K II), "Consequences" – TOR (Dec 2004)
- Time After Time, "Wait Until Next Year" – DAW (2005)
- Magic Tails, "Sleeping Beauties" – DAW (2005)
- Maiden, Matron, Crone, "The Gift" – DAW (2005)
- International House of Bubbas, "Bubba Suey" – Yard Dog Press (2005)
- LiftPort, "Going Up?" – Meisha Merlin (Jan 2006)
- Children of Magic, "Nethan’s Magic" – DAW (2006)
- This Is My Funniest, reprint of "The Growling", ed. Mike Resnick, BenBella Books (2006)
- The Magic Toybox, "The Revenge of Chatty Cathy" – DAW (2006)
- Furry Fantastic, "Superstition" – DAW (2006)
- Army of the Fantastic, "Airborne" – DAW (2007)
- If I Were an Evil Overlord, "Ensuring the Succession" – DAW (2007)
- Tales of the Red Lion, "Kindred Spirits" – Twilight Tales (2007)
- Front Lines, "The Battle for Trehinnick's Garden" – DAW (2008)
- Fellowship Fantastic, "Sweet Threads" – DAW (Jan 2008)
- Mystery Date, "Venus in Blue Jeans" – DAW (Feb 2008)
- Witch High, "Another Learning Experience" – DAW (2008)
- Here Be Dragons, "Pat the Magic Dragon" – DragonCon (Aug 2008)
- Enchantment Place, "Altar Ego" – DAW (2008)
- The Dimension Next Door, "Waiting for Evolution" – DAW (Jul 2008)
- Terribly Twisted Tales, "No Good Deed" – DAW (2008)
- Witch Way to the Mall, "There’s No ‘I’ in Coven" – DAW (2009)
- Zombie Raccoons and Killer Bunnies, "Death Mask" – DAW (2009)
- Gamer Fantastic, "Roles We Play" – DAW (2009)
- Strip-Mauled, "Howl!" – Baen (2009)
- Timeshares, "Time Sharing" – DAW (Mar 2010)
- Gateways, "Virtually, A Cat" (reprint) – TOR (Jul 2010)
- Fangs for the Mammaries, "Overbite" – Baen (Sep 2010)
- Steampunk’d, "Portrait of a Lady in a Monocle" – DAW (Nov 2010)
- Love and Rockets, "Dance of Life" – DAW (TBA)
- Hot and Steamy, "Clockworks" – DAW (Jun 2011)
- Untold Adventures: A D&D Anthology, "To Chaos and Back Again" (Jun 2011)
- Westward Weird, "Lone Wolf" – DAW (2011)
- Exiled: Clan of the Claw, "Cata" (by John Ringo and Nye) – Baen (hc 2011, pb 2012)
- Human for a Day, "The Very Next Day" – DAW (2012)
- Cast of Characters, "Small Sacrifices" – Fiction Studio Books (2012)
- Baker Street Irregulars: Thirteen Authors with New Takes on Sherlock Holmes, "The Scent of Truth" - Diversion Publishing (Mar 2017)

=== Teleplays ===
- Dinosaucers animated TV series, "Toy-ranosaurus Store Wars" script – DIC Entertainment

=== Non-fiction ===
- "Dungeon Etiquette", The Dragon #130, TSR Inc (1988)
- It Seemed Like a Good Idea at the Time, various articles – Avon Books (2000)
- You Did What?, various articles – Avon (2004)
- Alias Assumed, "Why Sydney Has No Social Life" – BenBella Books (Aug 2005)
- FarScape Forever, "My Imaginary Friend" – BenBella (Oct 2005)
- Charmed, "Talent and the Socialism of Fear" – BenBella (Nov 2005)
- Battle of Azeroth, "Advice for the Warlorn" – BenBella (2006)
- So Say We All, "Report to Congress" – BenBella (2006)
- Nebula Awards 2010 anthology, "Medium with a Message" – (2010)
- Chicks Dig Time Lords, "Hopelessly Devoted to Who" – Mad Norwegian Press (2010)
- SFWA Bulletin, "Being a convention literary guest" (vol 4 iss 3, Aug-Sep 2010)
- SFWA Bulletin, "Conventional Wisdom: DragonCon" (Spring 2011)
- SFWA Bulletin, "Conventional Wisdom: GenCon" (Summer 2011)
- SFWA Bulletin, "Conventional Wisdom: Small Cons" (Fall 2011)
- SFWA Bulletin, "Conventional Wisdom: Interview Gene Wolfe" (Winter 2012)
- SFWA Bulletin, "Conventional Wisdom: Writers Workshops" (Spring 2012)
- SFWA Bulletin, "Conventional Wisdom: 1,000 Cons" (Summer 2012)
