= Gary Ruddell =

American painter

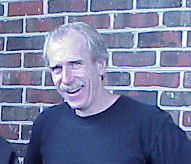
Gary Ruddell

Gary Ruddell (born November 16, 1951) is an American artist best known for his figurative representational paintings. As well as his illustrations for works of science fiction and fantasy literature. His cover artwork for Dan Simmons's novel Hyperion was nominated for the 1990 Hugo Award for Best Original Artwork.

== Early career and life ==
November 16, 1951 in San Mateo, California, Ruddell was raised in Northern California and holds a Bachelor of Fine Arts degree from the California College of the Arts (1975). As a teen, Ruddell got his start being published in automotive magazines doing car cartoons and illustrations. After graduating from college, Ruddell began a career as a freelance illustrator. Some of Ruddell's clients include Bantam Books, Harcourt Brace Jovanovich, Avon Books, Ace Books, Ballantine Books and Baen Books. His artwork has been featured on the covers of books by such science fiction luminaries as Robert Lynn Asprin, Lois McMaster Bujold, C. J. Cherryh, and Connie Willis. Other commercial clients have included Playboy Magazine, Rolling Stone Magazine, Broderbund Software, Magic: The Gathering and Sega Corporation. He also designed the cover of Manowar's album Battle Hymns.

== Fine art career ==
In the early 1990s Ruddell made a major shift in his work, turning towards figurative fine art. Essentially leaving the illustration scene. Since this shift, Ruddell has been exhibiting and showing in museums, galleries, universities and exhibitions across the United States. He has cited Bay Area Figurative Movement as a significant influence on his art. He has said of his work, "I like to think of my paintings as stills in a film, suspended moments, a private glimpse into the human condition."
