= Elizabeth Moon =

American writer (born 1945)

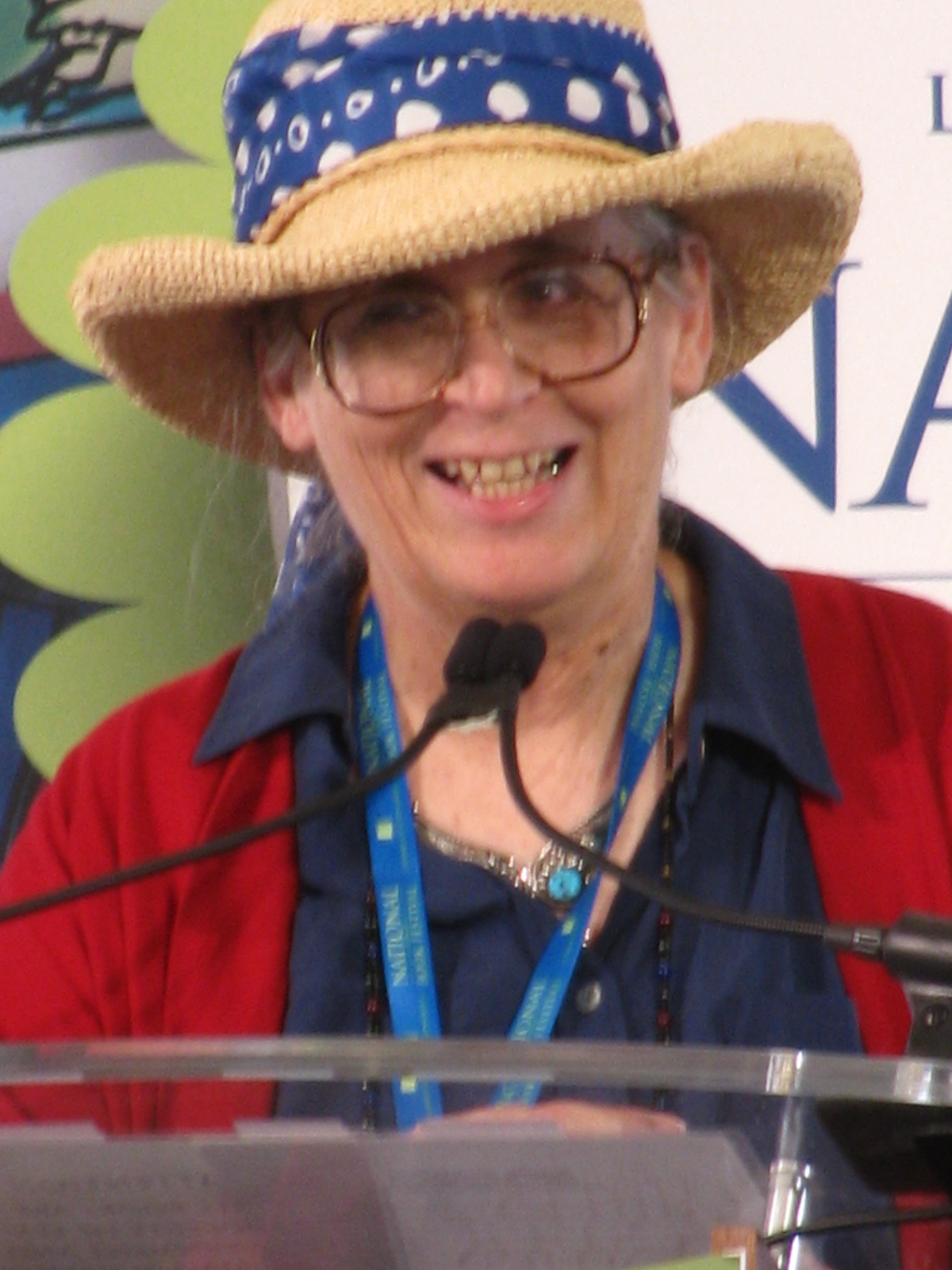
- Moon at the 2013 National Book Festival
- Born: March 7, 1945 (age 81); McAllen, Texas, U.S.
- Occupation: Novelist
- Spouse: Richard Sloan Moon (m. 1969)
- Writing career
- Period: 1988–present
- Genres: Military science fiction, science fiction, fantasy
- Website: www.elizabethmoon.com

Elizabeth Moon (born March 7, 1945) is an American science fiction and fantasy writer. Her other writing includes newspaper columns and opinion pieces. Her novel The Speed of Dark won the 2003 Nebula Award. Prior to her writing career, she served in the United States Marine Corps.

== Early life ==
Moon was born Susan Elizabeth Norris and grew up in McAllen, Texas. She started writing when she was a child and first tried a book, which was about her dog, at age six. She was inspired to write creatively, and says that she began writing science fiction in her teens, considering it a sideline.

She earned a Bachelor's degree in History from Rice University in Houston, Texas in 1968 and later earned a second B.A. in Biology. In 1968, she joined the United States Marine Corps as a computer specialist, attaining the rank of 1st Lieutenant while on active duty. She married Richard Sloan Moon in 1969 and they have a son, Michael, born in 1983.

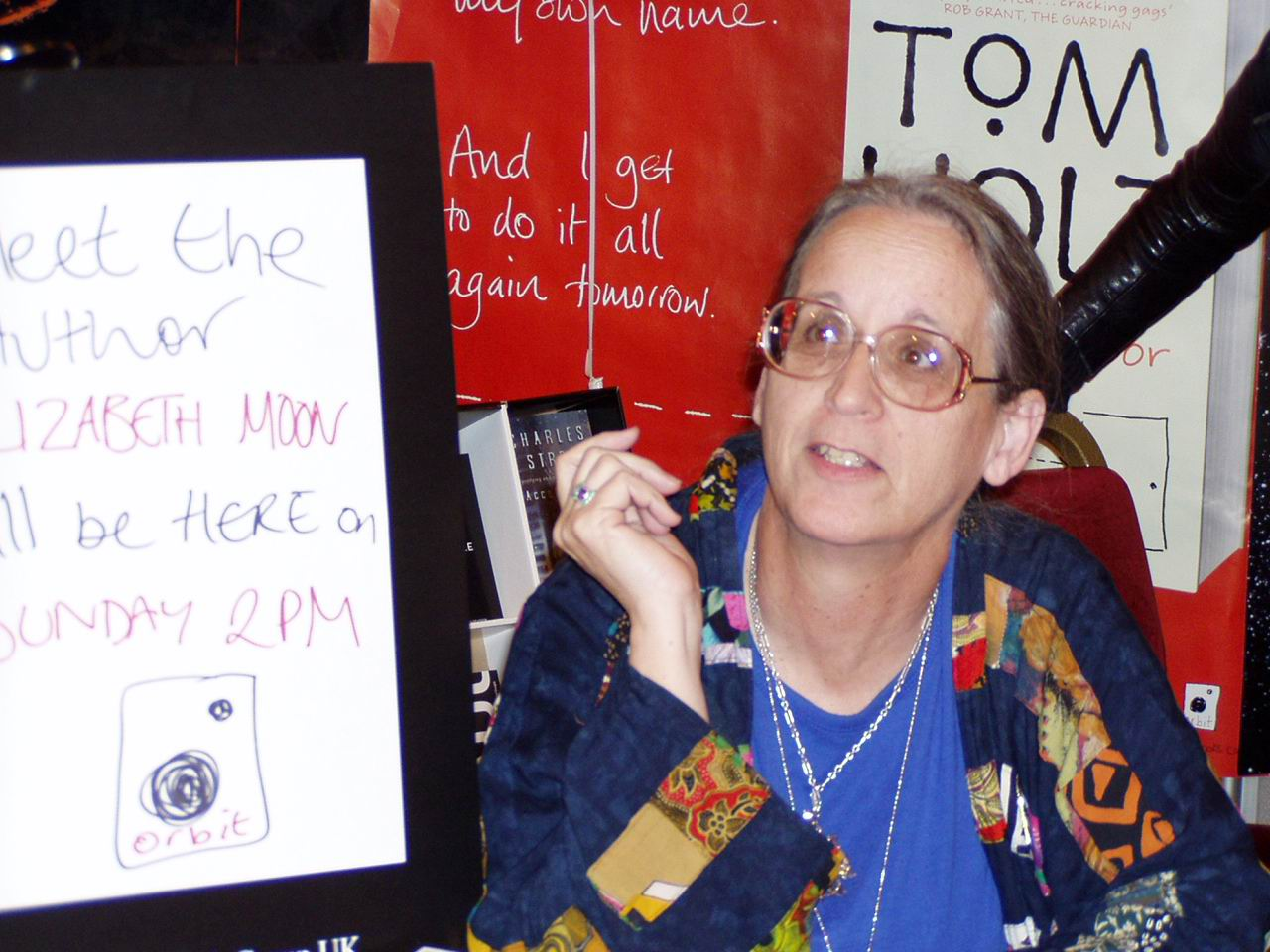
Moon at the 63rd World Science Fiction Convention, Glasgow, August 2005

== Writing career ==
Moon began writing professionally in her mid-thirties and had a newspaper column in a county weekly newspaper. In 1986, she published her first science fiction in the monthly magazine Analog and the anthology series Sword and Sorceress. Her stories appeared regularly in Analog the next few years. Her first novel Sheepfarmer's Daughter (1988) won the Compton Crook Award and inaugurated the Paksenarrion series.

Most of her work has military science fiction themes, although biology, politics, and personal relationships also feature strongly. The Serrano Legacy is a space opera. Her Nebula-winning novel The Speed of Dark (2003) is a near-future story told from the viewpoint of an autistic data analyst, inspired by her own autistic son Michael.

== Other interests ==
Elizabeth Moon has many interests besides writing. She has a musical background, having played the accordion during her university days and sung in choirs. She is an accomplished fencer, and captain of the SFWA Musketeers, a group of published speculative fiction authors who also fence.

Moon is also an experienced paramedic and has served in various capacities in local government.

== Awards and nominations ==
- 1989: Compton Crook Award winner for Sheepfarmer's Daughter
- 1997: Hugo Award for Best Novel (nomination) for Remnant Population
- 2003: Nebula Award for Best Novel winner for Speed of Dark
- 2003: Arthur C. Clarke Award (nomination) for Speed of Dark
- 2007: Robert A. Heinlein Award for "outstanding published works in hard science fiction or technical writings that inspire the human exploration of space"

== Works ==
=== Paksenarrion ===
==== The Deed of Paksenarrion ====
1. Sheepfarmer's Daughter (June 1988)
2. Divided Allegiance (October 1988)
3. Oath of Gold (January 1989)

Those Who Walk in Darkness” (March 1990)—short story set during Oath of Gold, included in the collections Lunar Activity and Phases

In addition, several omnibus editions (1992, 2003, 2010) entitled The Deed of Paksenarrion have been released.

==== The Legacy of Gird ====
1. Surrender None (June 1990)—prequel to The Deed of Paksenarrion
2. Liar's Oath (May 1992)—sequel to Surrender None

Omnibus editions: The Legacy of Gird (September 1996); A Legacy of Honour (November 2010)

==== Paladin's Legacy or Legend of Paksenarrion ====
1. Oath of Fealty (March 2010)—sequel to Oath of Gold
2. Kings of the North (March 2011)
3. Echoes of Betrayal (February 2012)
4. Limits of Power (June 2013)
5. Crown of Renewal (May 2014)

==== Dragon's Paladin ====
1. Horngard (October 2026)

==== Paksenarrion World Chronicles ====
1. Deeds of Honor (2014) includes "Point of Honor", "Falk's Oath", "Cross Purposes", "Torre's Ride", "A Parrion of Cooking", "Vardan's Tale", "Those Who Walk in Darkness", and "The Last Lesson".
2. Deeds of Youth (2023) includes "A Bad Day at Duke's East", "The Dun Mare's Grandchild", "Dream's Quarry", "Gifts", "First Blood", "Mercenary's Honor", and "Consequences"
3. Deeds of Wisdom (2025) includes "In the Valley of Death", "My Princess", "The Shepherd's Tale", "Judgment", "Final Honor", and "Destiny"

=== Serrano Legacy (Familias Regnant) ===
- Heris Serrano trilogy
1. Hunting Party (July 1993)
2. Sporting Chance (September 1994)
3. Winning Colors (August 1995)

Heris Serrano (July 2002)—Baen omnibus edition of Hunting Party, Sporting Chance and Winning Colors
The Serrano Legacy: Omnibus One (December 2006)—Orbit GB omnibus

- Esmay Suiza duology
1. Once a Hero (Hardcover ISBN 0-671-87769-0, March 1997)
2. Rules of Engagement (Hardcover ISBN 0-671-57777-8, December 1998)

The Serrano Connection: Omnibus Two (September 2007)—Orbit GB omnibus
The Serrano Connection (October 2008)—Baen omnibus edition

- Suiza and Serrano duology
1. Change of Command (Hardcover ISBN 0-671-57840-5, December 1999)
2. Against the Odds (Hardcover ISBN 0-671-31961-2, December 2000)

The Serrano Succession: Omnibus Three (February 2008)—Orbit GB omnibus

=== Vatta's War ===
1. Trading in Danger (Hardcover ISBN 0-345-44760-3, October 2003)
2. Marque and Reprisal (Hardcover ISBN 0-345-44758-1, October 2004)—Moving Target in the UK, New Zealand and Australia
3. Engaging the Enemy (Hardcover ISBN 0-345-44756-5, March 2006)
4. Command Decision (Hardcover ISBN 978-0-345-49159-6, February 2007)
5. Victory Conditions (Hardcover ISBN 978-0-345-49161-9, February 2008)

=== Vatta's Peace ===
1. Cold Welcome (Hardcover ISBN 978-1-101-88731-8, April 2017)
2. Into the Fire (Hardcover ISBN 978-1-101-88734-9, February 2018)

=== Planet Pirates ===
The Planet Pirates trilogy is based on two books by Anne McCaffrey, Dinosaur Planet and Dinosaur Planet Survivors (1978 and 1984, jointly reissued as The Ireta Adventure in 1985 and The Mystery of Ireta in 2004), which also form the core of The Death of Sleep. ISFDB catalogs all five novels as the Ireta series.

1. Sassinak (Baen Books, March 1990), Anne McCaffrey and Moon
2. The Death of Sleep (Baen, June 1990), McCaffrey and Jody Lynn Nye
3. Generation Warriors (Baen, February 1991), McCaffrey and Moon

Omnibus edition: The Planet Pirates (Baen, October 1993), McCaffrey, Moon, and Nye

=== Other novels ===
- Remnant Population (Hardcover ISBN 0-671-87718-6, May 1996)
- Speed of Dark (Orbit UK October 2002)—as The Speed of Dark (Ballantine 2003) in the USA

==== Short stories ====
- "And Ladies of the Club" (1995; collected in Esther Friesner's anthology Chicks in Chainmail)
- "Tradition" (1998; collected in Harry Turtledove's anthology Alternate Generals)

=== Collections ===
- Lunar Activity (ISBN 978-0-671-69870-6, March 1990)—Ten short stories
- Phases (ISBN 978-0-671-87855-9, December 1997)—Eight stories from Lunar Activity, and others previously uncollected.

Both include "Those Who Walk in Darkness"—a Paksenarrion short story

- Moon Flights (hardcover ISBN 1-59780-109-7, paperback ISBN 978-1-59780-110-2, August 2008)—Fifteen stories, including an original "Vatta's War" story, with an introduction by Anne McCaffrey
  - The limited edition hardcover (ISBN 978-1-59780-108-9, September 2007) contains an additional rare bonus story entitled "Fencing In".
- Deeds of Honor: Paksenarrion World Chronicles (ISBN 978-1-62567-114-1, June 2015)—Eight stories set in the world of Paksenarrion.
- Deeds of Youth: Paksenarrion World Chronicles II (ISBN 978-1-62567-638-2, July 2023)—Seven stories set in the world of Paksenarrion.
- Deeds of Wisdom: Paksenarrion World Chronicles III (ISBN 978-1-62567-795-2, July 2025)—Six stories set in the world of Paksenarrion.

== See also ==
- Women in speculative fiction
