= A Treasury of Science Fiction =

American anthology of science fiction short stories edited by Groff Conklin

- dust cover of first edition
- Editor: Groff Conklin
- Language: English
- Genre: Science fiction
- Publisher: Crown Publishers
- Publication date: 1948
- Publication place: United States
- Media type: Print (hardcover)
- Pages: ix, 517

A Treasury of Science Fiction is an American anthology of science fiction short stories edited by Groff Conklin. It was first published in hardcover by Crown Publishers in 1948, and reprinted in March 1951. A later edition was issued by Bonanza Books/Crown Publishers in March 1980. An abridged paperback version including eight of its thirty stories was published by Berkley Books in July 1957 and reprinted in January 1958 and January 1965.

The book and Adventures in Time and Space were among the only science fiction hardcovers from large, mainstream publishers before about 1950. It collects thirty novellas, novelettes and short stories by various science fiction authors, together with an introduction by the editor. The stories were previously published from 1929-1947 in various science fiction and other magazines. Conklin did not know how to contact Martin Pearson, and used an advertisement in Astounding Science Fiction to find him to pay the royalty.

== Contents ==
- "Introduction" (Groff Conklin)
- "The Nightmare" (Chan Davis)
- "Tomorrow's Children" (Poul Anderson and F. N. Waldrop)
- "The Last Objective" (Paul Carter)
- "Loophole" (Arthur C. Clarke)
- "The Figure" (Edward Grendon)
- "The Great Fog" (H. F. Heard)
- "The Chrysalis" (P. Schuyler Miller)
- "Living Fossil" (L. Sprague de Camp)
- "N Day" (Philip Latham)
- "With Folded Hands" (Jack Williamson)
- "No Woman Born" (C. L. Moore)
- "With Flaming Swords" (Cleve Cartmill)
- "Children of the "Betsy B"" (Malcolm Jameson)
- "Child's Play" (William Tenn)
- "The Person from Porlock" (Raymond F. Jones)
- "Juggernaut" (A. E. van Vogt)
- "The Eternal Man" (D. D. Sharp)
- "Mimsy Were the Borogoves" (Lewis Padgett (Henry Kuttner and C. L. Moore))
- "Time and Time Again" (H. Beam Piper)
- "Housing Shortage" (Harry Walton)
- "Flight of the Dawn Star" (Robert Moore Williams)
- "Vintage Season" (Lawrence O'Donnell (Henry Kuttner and C. L. Moore))
- "Of Jovian Build" (Oscar J. Friend)
- "Wings Across the Cosmos" (Polton Cross)
- "The Embassy" (Martin Pearson)
- "Dark Mission" (Lester del Rey)
- "The Ethical Equations" (Murray Leinster)
- "It's Great to Be Back" (Robert A. Heinlein)
- "Tools" (Clifford D. Simak)
- "Rescue Party" (Arthur C. Clarke)
