= Jirel of Joiry (collection) =

Collection of stories by C. L. Moore

- First edition cover
- Author: C. L. Moore
- Language: English
- Genre: Fantasy short stories
- Publisher: Paperback Library
- Publication date: 1969
- Publication place: United States
- Media type: Print (hardback & paperback)
- Pages: 160 pp
- OCLC: 4902030

Jirel of Joiry is a collection of five fantasy stories by C. L. Moore, often characterized as sword and sorcery. The volume compiles all but one of Moore's stories featuring the title character, a female warrior in an imagined version of medieval France. All the stories were published in Weird Tales during the 1930s. After being published as a paperback original by Paperback Library in 1969, the collection was reissued by Ace Books in the 1980s and 1990s.

Donald M. Grant published an illustrated hardcover edition in 1977, under the title Black God's Shadow.

In 2007, a British omnibus combining Jirel of Joiry with Moore's "Northwest Smith" stories appeared as Black Gods and Scarlet Dreams.

An expanded edition, titled Black God's Kiss, was published by Paizo Publishing in 2007.

== Contents ==
- "Jirel Meets Magic" (Weird Tales 1935)
- "Black God's Kiss" (Weird Tales 1934)
- "Black God's Shadow" (Weird Tales 1934)
- "The Dark Land" (Weird Tales 1936)
- "Hellsgarde" (Weird Tales 1939)

A sixth story, "Quest of the Starstone", written in collaboration with Henry Kuttner, teamed Jirel with Moore's science fiction hero Northwest Smith. It was finally collected with the other Jirel stories in the 2007 Black God's Kiss.

== Reception ==
Algis Budrys noted that while the Jirel stories were among Moore's earliest work, they remained effective more than thirty years later because "the events which occur to Jirel, as she struggles with the half-understood forces of darkness in her quasi-medieval world, are all things that play on the heart of what being you and me is all about."
