= Science fiction comedy =

Comedic subgenre of science fiction

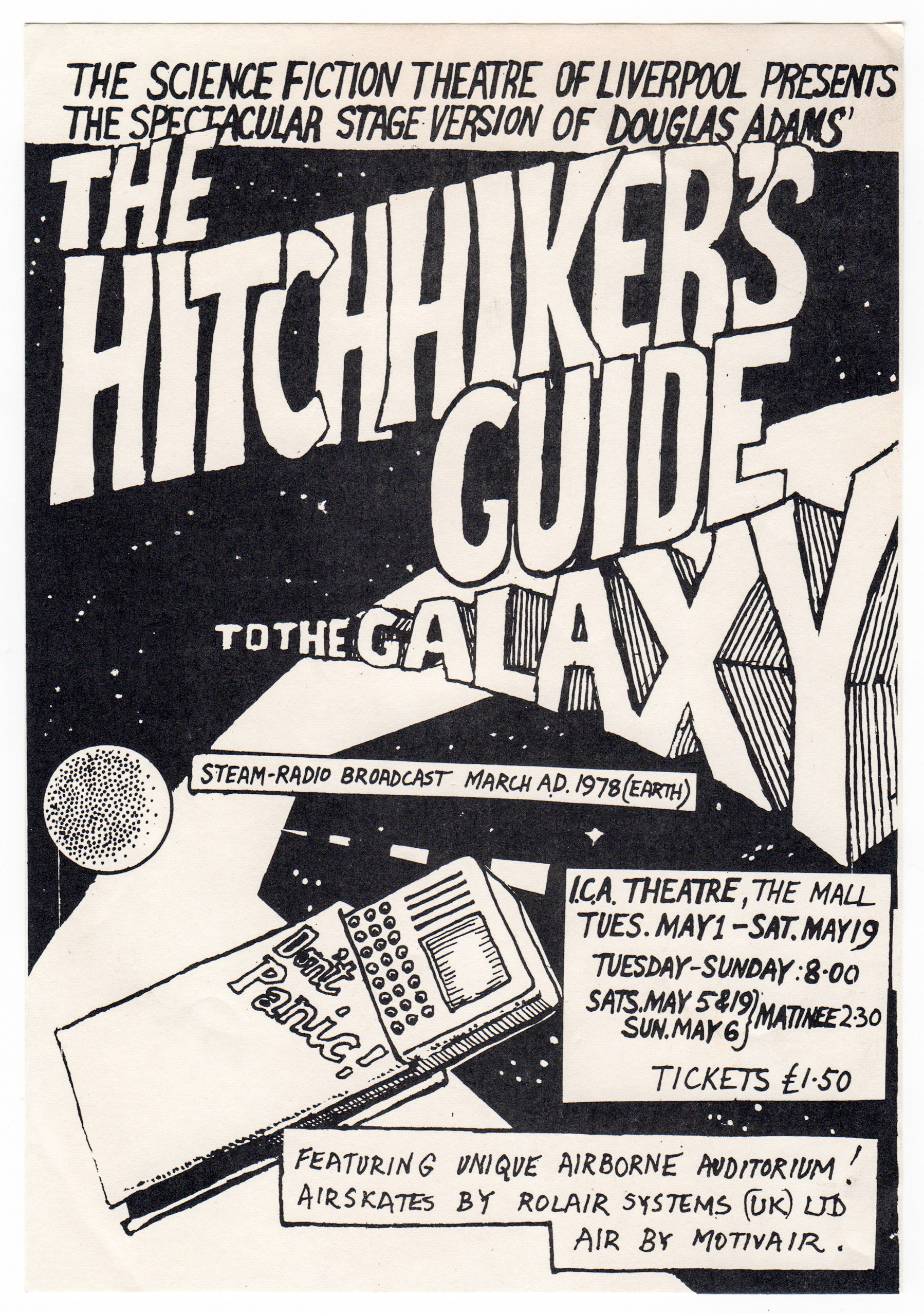
An influential science fiction comedy series: the poster for the 1979 Science Fiction Theatre of Liverpool production at Institute of Contemporary Arts, London, of The Hitchhiker's Guide to the Galaxy

Science fiction comedy (sci-fi comedy) or comic science fiction is a subgenre of science fiction or science fantasy that exploits the science fiction genre's conventions for comedic effect. The genre often mocks or satirizes standard science fiction conventions, concepts and tropes – such as alien invasion of Earth, interstellar travel, or futuristic technology. It can also satirize and criticize present-day society.

An early example was the Pete Manx series by Henry Kuttner and Arthur K. Barnes (sometimes writing together and sometimes separately, under the house pen-name of Kelvin Kent). Published in Thrilling Wonder Stories in the late 1930s and early 1940s, the series featured a time-traveling carnival barker who uses his con-man abilities to get out of trouble. Two later series cemented Kuttner's reputation as one of the most popular early writers of comic science fiction: the Gallegher series (about a drunken inventor and his narcissistic robot) and the Hogben series (about a family of mutant hillbillies). The former appeared in Astounding Science Fiction in 1943 and 1948 and was collected in hardcover as Robots Have No Tails (Gnome, 1952), and the latter appeared in Thrilling Wonder Stories in the late 1940s.

In the 1950s of the authors contributing to the sub-genre included: Alfred Bester, Harry Harrison, C. M. Kornbluth, Frederik Pohl, Fredric Brown, William Tenn and Robert Sheckley.

The Hitchhiker's Guide to the Galaxy is a science fiction comedy series written by Douglas Adams. Originally a radio comedy broadcast on BBC Radio 4 in 1978, it later morphed into other formats, including stage shows, novels, comic books, a 1981 TV series, a 1984 computer game, and 2005 feature film. A prominent series in British popular culture, The Hitchhiker's Guide to the Galaxy has become an international multi-media phenomenon; the novels are the most widely distributed, having been translated into more than 30 languages by 2005.

Terry Pratchett's 1981 novel Strata also exemplifies the science fiction comedy genre.

== See also ==
- List of science fiction comedy works
- List of science fiction comedy films
- Fantasy comedy
