= Worlds of Tomorrow =

Anthology edited by August Derleth

- First edition
- Editor: August Derleth
- Language: English
- Genre: Science fiction
- Publisher: Pellegrini & Cudahy
- Publication date: 1953
- Publication place: United States
- Media type: Print (hardback)
- Pages: 351

Worlds of Tomorrow is an anthology of science fiction stories edited by American writer August Derleth. It was first published by Pellegrini & Cudahy in 1953. Many of the stories had originally appeared in the magazines Worlds Beyond, Fantastic, Fantasy, The Magazine of Science Fiction, Fantasy and Science Fiction, If, Fantastic Adventures, Future, Startling Stories, Astounding Stories, Weird Tales, The Fantasy Fan and Thrilling Wonder Stories. Abridged editions were published by Weidenfeld & Nicolson in 1955, Berkley Books in 1958 and Four Square Books in 1963.

== Contents ==
- Introduction, by August Derleth
- "The Tinkler", by Poul Anderson
- "The Smile", by Ray Bradbury
- "The Fires Within", by Arthur C. Clarke
- "Superiority", by Arthur C. Clarke
- "McIlvaine's Star", by August Derleth
- "Brothers Beyond the Void", by Paul W. Fairman
- "Beautiful, Beautiful, Beautiful!", by Stuart Friedman
- "The Dead Planet", by Edmond Hamilton
- "Like a Bird, Like a Fish", by H. B. Hickey
- "The Gentleman Is an Epwa", by Carl Jacobi
- "The Enchanted Forest", by Fritz Leiber
- "The Great Cold", by Frank Belknap Long
- "From Beyond", by H. P. Lovecraft
- "Line to Tomorrow", by Lewis Padgett
- "The Business, as Usual", by Mack Reynolds
- "The Gardener", by Margaret St. Clair
- "The Martian and the Moron", by Theodore Sturgeon
- "Null-P", by William Tenn
- "Strange Harvest", by Donald Wandrei
