= Scarlet Dream =

1981 science fiction collection by C. L. Moore

- Cover of the first edition
- Author: C. L. Moore
- Illustrator: Alicia Austin
- Cover artist: Alicia Austin
- Language: English
- Series: Northwest Smith
- Genre: Science fiction short stories
- Publisher: Donald M. Grant, Publisher, Inc.
- Publication date: 1981
- Publication place: United States
- Media type: Print (hardback)
- Pages: 328 pp
- ISBN: 0-937986-42-9
- OCLC: 9152504
- Dewey Decimal: 813/.54 21
- LC Class: PS3525.O5368 S28 1981

Scarlet Dream is a collection of science fiction short stories by C. L. Moore with illustrations by Alicia Austin. It was first published in 1981 by Donald M. Grant, Publisher, Inc. in an edition of 1,820 copies, of which 220 were bound in buckram, boxed, and signed by the author and artist. The stories feature Moore's character Northwest Smith. All but the last story originally appeared in the magazine Weird Tales.

== Contents ==
- "Shambleau"
- "Black Thirst"
- "The Tree of Life"
- "Scarlet Dream"
- "Dust of Gods"
- "Lost Paradise"
- "Julhi"
- "The Cold Gray God"
- "Yvala"
- "Song in a Minor Key"
