= The Hogben Chronicles =

First edition (publ. Borderlands Press) Cover art by Cortney Skinner

The Hogben Chronicles is a 2013 collection of the Hogben series stories, published by Borderlands Books with an introduction by Neil Gaiman. The Hogben series consists of five stories of the comic science fiction genre, attributed in some cases to Henry Kuttner alone (as in this collection) and in others acknowledging the co-authorship of his wife, C. L. Moore.

The couple wrote various works in collaboration, sometimes using the joint pseudonym Lewis Padgett. Three Hogben stories have been given both Kuttner and Padgett attributions.

The works of the series are:

- "The Old Army Game", in the November 1941 issue of Thrilling Adventures for November 1941
- "Exit the Professor", October 1947 Thrilling Wonder Stories, Kuttner/"Padgett"
- "Pile of Trouble", April 1948 Thrilling Wonder Stories
- "See You Later", June 1949 Thrilling Wonder Stories, Kuttner/"Padgett"
- "Cold War", October 1949 Thrilling Wonder Stories, Kuttner/"Padgett"
