= A Gnome There Was =

1950 science fiction collection by Henry Kuttner and C. L. Moore

- Dust-jacket from the first edition
- Author: Lewis Padgett (pseudonym of Henry Kuttner and C. L. Moore)
- Cover artist: Edd Cartier
- Language: English
- Genre: Science fiction and fantasy
- Published: 1950 (Simon & Schuster)
- Publication place: United States
- Media type: Print (hardback)
- Pages: 276 pp

A Gnome There Was is a collection of science fiction and fantasy stories by American writers Henry Kuttner and C. L. Moore, published under their Lewis Padgett pseudonym by Simon & Schuster in 1950. No other editions were issued.

== Contents ==
- "A Gnome There Was" (Unknown 1941)
- "What You Need" (Astounding 1945)
- "The Twonky" (Astounding 1942)
- "The Cure" (Astounding 1946)
- "Exit the Professor" (Thrilling Wonder Stories 1947)
- "See You Later" (Thrilling Wonder Stories 1949)
- "Mimsy Were the Borogoves" (Astounding 1943)
- "Jesting Pilot" (Astounding 1947)
- "This Is the House" (Astounding 1946)
- "Rain Check" (Astounding 1946)
- "Compliments of the Author" (Unknown 1942)

"A Gnome There Was" and "Compliments of the Author" originally appeared under Kuttner's byline. "This Is the House" was originally credited to "Lawrence O'Donnell," another Kuttner/Moore pseudonym. The two stories originally credited to Kuttner are fantasies; the other stories are science fiction.

== Reception ==
Fletcher Pratt, writing in The New York Times, praised the collection as "Padgett at his best and most characteristic," saying that "the lightness of the method is in curious contrast to the thoughtfulness of the result." P. Schuyler Miller reviewed the collection favorably, describing it as "one of the best one-man-shows available" and praising "Mimsy Were the Borogoves" as a "masterpiece."
