= Shambleau and Others =

1953 collection of science fiction and fantasy short stories by C. L. Moore

- Dust-jacket from the first edition
- Author: C. L. Moore
- Cover artist: Ric Binkley
- Language: English
- Genre: Science fiction, fantasy
- Publisher: Gnome Press
- Publication date: 1953
- Publication place: United States
- Media type: Print (hardback)
- Pages: 224
- OCLC: 1137071

Shambleau and Others is a 1953 collection of science fiction and fantasy short stories by American writer C. L. Moore. The book was originally announced by Arkham House but never published by them. It was first published by Gnome Press in 1953 in an edition of 4,000 copies. The collections contains stories about Moore's characters Northwest Smith and Jirel of Joiry. The stories all originally appeared in the magazine Weird Tales.

== Contents ==
- "Black God’s Kiss"
- "Shambleau"
- "Black God’s Shadow"
- "Black Thirst"
- "The Tree of Life"
- "Jirel Meets Magic"
- "Scarlet Dream"

== Sources ==
- Chalker, Jack L.; Mark Owings (1998). The Science-Fantasy Publishers: A Bibliographic History, 1923-1998. Westminster, MD and Baltimore: Mirage Press, Ltd. pp. 301–302.
- Contento, William G. "Index to Science Fiction Anthologies and Collections".
