= Balrog Awards =

Literary award

The Balrog Awards were a set of awards given annually from 1979 to 1985 for the best works and achievements of speculative fiction in the previous year. The awards were named after the balrog, a fictional creature from J. R. R. Tolkien's Middle-earth legendarium. The awards were originally announced by editor Jonathan Bacon in Issue #15 of Fantasy Crossroads and presented at the Fool-Con II convention on April Fool's Day, 1979 at Johnson County Community College, Kansas. The awards were never taken seriously and are often referred to, tongue-in-cheek, as the "coveted Balrog Awards".

== Awards (by year) ==
=== 1979 ===
- Best Novel: Blind Voices, Tom Reamy
- Best Short Fiction: "Death from Exposure", Pat Cadigan
- Best Collection/Anthology: Born to Exile, Phyllis Eisenstein
- Best Poet: Ray Bradbury
- Best Artist: Tim Kirk
- Best Amateur Publication: Shayol
- Best Professional Publication: Age of Dreams, Alicia Austin
- Best Amateur Achievement: Paul C. Allen (for Fantasy Newsletter and "Of Swords & Sorcery")
- Best Professional Achievement: J. R. R. Tolkien and Donald M. Grant (tie)
- Judges' Choice: Jonathan Bacon (for Fantasy Crossroads)
- Judges' Choice: Andre Norton (for lifetime achievement)

=== 1980 ===
- Best Novel: Dragondrums, Anne McCaffrey
- Best Short Fiction: "The Last Defender of Camelot", Roger Zelazny
- Best Collection/Anthology: Night Shift, Stephen King
- Best Poet: H. Warner Munn
- Best Artist: Michael Whelan
- Best Amateur Publication: Fantasy Newsletter
- Best Professional Publication: Omni
- Best Amateur Achievement: Paul Allen (for Fantasy Newsletter and "Of Swords and Sorcery")
- Best Professional Achievement: Anne McCaffrey
- SF Film Hall of Fame: 2001: A Space Odyssey and Star Wars (tie)
- Fantasy Film Hall of Fame: Fantasia
- Special Award: Ian Ballantine & Betty Ballantine

=== 1981 ===
- Best Novel: The Wounded Land, Stephen R. Donaldson
- Best Short Fiction: "The Web of the Magi", Richard Cowper
- Best Collection/Anthology: Unfinished Tales, J. R. R. Tolkien, edited by Christopher Tolkien
- Best Poet: H. Warner Munn
- Best Artist: Frank Frazetta
- Best Amateur Publication: Fantasy Newsletter
- Best Professional Publication: F&SF
- Best Amateur Achievement: Paul C. Allen & Susan Allen (for Fantasy Newsletter)
- Best Professional Achievement: George Lucas (for contributions, including the Star Wars saga)
- SF Film Hall of Fame: The Empire Strikes Back
- Fantasy Film Hall of Fame: The Wizard of Oz
- Special Award: Jorge Luis Borges
- Special Award: Fritz Leiber

=== 1982 ===
- Best Novel: Camber the Heretic, Katherine Kurtz
- Best Short Fiction: "A Thief in Korianth", C. J. Cherryh
- Best Collection/Anthology: Shadows of Sanctuary, Robert Lynn Asprin, ed.
- Best Poet: Frederick Mayer
- Best Artist: Real Musgrave
- Best Amateur Publication: Eldritch Tales
- Best Professional Publication: Omni
- Best Amateur Achievement: Robert A. Collins (for saving Fantasy Newsletter)
- Best Professional Achievement: George Lucas and Steven Spielberg (tie)
- SF Film Hall of Fame: Forbidden Planet
- Fantasy Film Hall of Fame: King Kong
- Judges' Choice: Leo & Diane Dillon

=== 1983 ===
- Best Novel: The One Tree, Stephen R. Donaldson
- Best Short Fiction: "All of Us Are Dying", George Clayton Johnson
- Best Collection/Anthology: Storm Season, Robert Lynn Asprin, ed.
- Best Poet: Frederick J. Mayer
- Best Artist: Tim Hildebrandt
- Best Amateur Publication: Shayol
- Best Professional Publication: F&SF
- Best Amateur Achievement: Allan Bechtold (for SF workshops)
- Best Professional Achievement: Ben Bova (for writing and editing Omni and Analog)
- SF Film Hall of Fame: The Day the Earth Stood Still
- Fantasy Film Hall of Fame: The Dark Crystal
- Special Award: Kirby McCauley

=== 1984 ===
- Best Novel: The Armageddon Rag, George R. R. Martin
- Best Short Story: "Wizard Goes A-Courtin'", John Morressy
- Best Collection/Anthology: Unicorn Variations, Roger Zelazny
- Best Poet: Frederick J. Mayer
- Best Artist: Real Musgrave
- Best Amateur Publication: Fantasy Newsletter
- Best Professional Publication: F&SF
- Best Amateur Achievement: Stan Gardner (for saving the Balrogs)
- Best Professional Achievement: Pendragon Gallery (for promoting fantasy artwork)
- SF Film Hall of Fame: Blade Runner
- Fantasy Film Hall of Fame: Bambi
- Judges' Choice: Mercer Mayer (for educating children in fantasy art)

=== 1985 ===
- Best Novel: The Practice Effect, David Brin
- Best Short Story: "A Troll and Two Roses", Patricia A. McKillip
- Best Collection/Anthology: Daughter of Regals and Other Tales, Stephen R. Donaldson
- Best Poet: Ardath Mayhar
- Best Artist: Richard Pini & Wendy Pini
- Best Amateur Publication: Eldritch Tales
- Best Professional Publication: Masques, J. N. Williamson, ed.
- Best Amateur Achievement: David B. Silva (for The Horror Show)
- Best Professional Achievement: Hap Henriksen (for the National SF/Fantasy Hall of Fame)
- SF Film Hall of Fame: Starman
- SF Film Hall of Fame: E.T. The Extraterrestrial
- Fantasy Film Hall of Fame: Raiders of the Lost Ark
- Special Award: Lester del Rey

== See also ==
- Bram Stoker Award
- Hugo Award
- Nebula Award
- World Fantasy Award
- List of science fiction awards
