= Tomorrow and Tomorrow & The Fairy Chessmen =

1947 novel by Lewis Padgett

- First edition
- Author: Lewis Padgett
- Cover artist: Harry Harrison
- Language: English
- Genre: Science fiction
- Publisher: Gnome Press
- Publication date: 1951
- Publication place: United States
- Media type: Print (hardback)
- Pages: 254 pp

Tomorrow and Tomorrow & The Fairy Chessmen is a 1951 collection of two science fiction novellas by Lewis Padgett (pseudonym of Henry Kuttner and C. L. Moore). It was first published by Gnome Press in 1951 in an edition of 4,000 copies. Both of the novellas originally appeared in the magazine Astounding. P. Schuyler Miller placed the stories "among the best of the kind [of] the van Vogtian tradition of ultra-involved mystification."

== Contents ==
- Tomorrow and Tomorrow
- The Fairy Chessmen
  - Subsequently titled Chessboard Planet. There are now only two nations on earth. America is the one where the story takes place, and the Falangists (the result of a European union) the other. Two nations in total war against each other.
