= Mutant (short story collection) =

1953 collection of science fiction short stories by Lewis Padgett

- Dust-jacket from the first edition
- Author: Lewis Padgett
- Cover artist: Ric Binkley
- Language: English
- Genre: Science fiction
- Publisher: Gnome Press
- Publication date: 1953
- Publication place: United States
- Media type: Print (hardback)
- Pages: 210
- OCLC: 1689391
- Text: Mutant online

Mutant is a 1953 collection of science fiction short stories by Lewis Padgett (pseudonym of American writer Henry Kuttner and C. L. Moore). It was first published by Gnome Press in 1953 in an edition of 4,000 copies. The stories all originally appeared in the magazine Astounding.

== Contents ==
- "The Piper’s Son"
- "Three Blind Mice"
- "The Lion and the Unicorn"
- "Beggars in Velvet"
- "Humpty Dumpty"
- Epilogue

== Reception ==
P. Schuyler Miller found the story compilation nearly as effective as Simak's City. Groff Conklin, reviewing the 1953 edition for Galaxy, characterized it as "among the most mature, imaginative and moving pictures of a post-atomic-war world." While Boucher and McComas praised the stories as "splendid statements of the difficulties of adjustment between man and esper-man," they found that taken together they became "repetitive in plot and situation." Writing for the New York Times, McComas declared that Kuttner's treatment of the theme was "so perfect, so complete" that all subsequent writers "have been confined within his all-embracing framework" and praised the volume as "a beguiling story rich in reading entertainment."

== Sources ==
- Chalker, Jack L.; Mark Owings (1998). The Science-Fantasy Publishers: A Bibliographic History, 1923-1998. Westminster, MD and Baltimore: Mirage Press, Ltd. p. 301.
- Contento, William G. "Index to Science Fiction Anthologies and Collections".
