= Black God's Shadow =

Book of fantasy short stories by C.L. Moore

- Cover of the first edition
- Author: C. L. Moore
- Illustrator: Alicia Austin
- Cover artist: Alicia Austin
- Language: English
- Series: Jirel of Joiry
- Genre: Fantasy
- Publisher: Donald M. Grant, Publisher, Inc.
- Publication date: 1977
- Publication place: United States
- Media type: Print (hardback)
- Pages: 252
- OCLC: 15625420

Black God's Shadow is a collection of fantasy short stories by American writer C. L. Moore and illustrator Alicia Austin. It was first published in 1977 by Donald M. Grant, Publisher, Inc. in an edition of 2,550 copies, of which 150 were bound in buckram, boxed, and signed by the author and artist. The stories feature Moore's character Jirel of Joiry, and originally appeared in the magazine Weird Tales. The stories were previously collected in a different configuration under the title Jirel of Joiry (1969).

== Contents ==
- "Black God's Kiss"
- "Black God's Shadow"
- "Jirel Meets Magic"
- "The Dark Land"
- "Hellsgarde"

== General references ==
- Chalker, Jack L.; Mark Owings (1998). The Science-Fantasy Publishers: A Bibliographic History, 1923-1998. Westminster, MD and Baltimore: Mirage Press, Ltd. p. 324.
- Contento, William G. "Index to Science Fiction Anthologies and Collections". Archived from the original on 2008-06-28.
- Reginald, Robert (1992). Science Fiction and Fantasy Literature 1975-1991. Detroit: Gale Research. pp. 684. ISBN 0-8103-1825-3.
