= Happy Ending (short story) =

1948 short story by Henry Kuttner

"Happy Ending" is a 1948 science fiction short story by American writer Henry Kuttner. Originally published in Thrilling Wonder Stories, it has since been published in various anthologies and a collection of Kuttner's short stories.

== Plot summary ==
The narrative proceeds out-of-sequence. As the story begins, a man named James Kelvin presses a button and returns to a lab with a moustached scientist who informs him that he is now a millionaire. Now that the button had completed its task, it no longer works. Kelvin lives happily ever after. The end.

The story then switches to an earlier point. A man walks into a fortune telling booth where he meets a robot from the future. The robot greets him as James Kelvin and says that while unable to give Kelvin a horoscope, it can supply him with a method to attain health, wealth and fame. Kelvin receives a gadget with a button on it. Every time he presses the button, he will temporarily enter the mind of someone in the future and can read that person's thoughts and gain his abilities. But the robot warns him, "there is a danger, named Tharn". Afterwards, the name Tharn keeps recurring to him.

Later that night, Tharn appears to him. To escape, Kelvin presses the button and lands in a stream. Unable to swim, he frantically presses the button again, which gives him the ability to breathe under water. To escape the stream, he presses the button yet again and lands in New Orleans in a drunken state. He presses the button again and is transported into a lab. There he meets a bald man with a red mustache. He begins a scientific conversation with him on proteins and amino acids, with ideas stolen from the mind of the future scientist, Quarra Vee. He offers a brilliant suggestion to cure rhinitis that could make him millions of dollars. Tharn appears again, forcing Kelvin to press the button. He lands in a cornfield in Seattle and then decides that he must kill Tharn. Moments later, Tharn appears and, when Kelvin presses the button, he gains the ability for a lethal mental attack. Tharn is destroyed.

Finally, the story switches to an even earlier point. The scientist Quarra Vee, and his android companion, Tharn, are preparing to go into the past to recapture a dangerous runaway robot. Quarra Vee is transported into Chicago and walks into a fortune telling booth. As he enters, a rope knocks aside the glasses which are supposed to protect him from attempts to tamper with his memory. The robot erases his true personality, and tells him he is James Kelvin. The robot smiles.

== Release ==
"Happy Ending" was first published in the August 1948 issue of Thrilling Wonder Stories. It was subsequently published as part of various anthologies such as Beyond Tomorrow and The Best Science Fiction Stories: 1949. It did not appear in a collection under the writer's own name until 2010, when it was included in Detour to Otherness, with 23 other stories written by Kuttner himself or in collaboration with his wife, Catherine Moore.
