= Northwest of Earth =

1954 collection of science fiction and fantasy short stories by C. L. Moore

- Dust-jacket from the first edition
- Author: C. L. Moore
- Cover artist: Ric Binkley
- Language: English
- Genre: Science fiction, fantasy
- Publisher: Gnome Press
- Publication date: 1954
- Publication place: United States
- Media type: Print (hardback)
- Pages: 212 pp
- OCLC: 1826570

Northwest of Earth is a 1954 collection of science fiction and fantasy short stories by C. L. Moore. It was first published by Gnome Press in 1954 in an edition of 4,000 copies. The collections contains stories about Moore's characters Northwest Smith and Jirel of Joiry. The stories all originally appeared in the magazine Weird Tales.

== Contents ==
- "The Cold Gray God"
- "The Dark Land"
- "Dust of Gods"
- "Hellsgarde"
- "Julhi"
- "Lost Paradise"
- "Yvala"

== Reception ==
P. Schuyler Miller praised the collection as "full of the lush, colorful tapestry of words which Merritt did best of all, and which we lack in most modern science fiction." J. Francis McComas reviewed it favorably in The New York Times, but noted that it represented Moore's "youthful" work.

== Sources ==
- Chalker, Jack L.; Mark Owings (1998). The Science-Fantasy Publishers: A Bibliographic History, 1923-1998. Westminster, MD and Baltimore: Mirage Press, Ltd. p. 303.
- Contento, William G. "Index to Science Fiction Anthologies and Collections".
