= Line to Tomorrow =

- First edition
- Author: Lewis Padgett
- Cover artist: Mitchell Hooks
- Language: English
- Genre: Science fiction, fantasy
- Publisher: Bantam Books
- Publication date: 1954
- Media type: Print (paperback)
- Pages: 224 pp
- OCLC: 5539498

Line to Tomorrow is a collection of science fiction and fantasy stories by American writers Henry Kuttner and C. L. Moore, published by Bantam Books in 1954. The book carried the byline of their joint pseudonym Lewis Padgett; the title is sometimes reported as Line to Tomorrow and Other Stories of Fantasy and Science Fiction. Two of the stories were originally published under Kuttner's byline, but all are now generally considered joint efforts.

== Reception ==
Anthony Boucher described the collection as "consistently top-grade Padgett," praising its "superlative combination of literary quality, narrative drive, and detailed scientific or fantastic thinking."
