= Ahead of Time =

Ahead of Time may refer to:

- Ahead-of-time compilation, computer code compilation strategy
- Ahead of Time (short story collection), a collection of science fiction stories by Henry Kuttner
- Ahead of Time (film), a 2004 Icelandic musical comedy film
- Guru Ji: Ahead of Time, a 2018 Indian documentary film by Sudipto Sen
