= Ahead of Time (short story collection) =

1953 collection of short stories by Henry Kuttner

- Cover of first edition (hardcover)
- Author: Henry Kuttner
- Cover artist: Richard Powers
- Language: English
- Genre: Science fiction
- Publisher: Ballantine Books
- Publication date: 1953
- Publication place: United States
- Media type: Print (hardback & paperback)
- Pages: 177

Ahead of Time is a collection of science fiction stories by the American writer Henry Kuttner, first published in hardcover by Ballantine Books in 1953, with a paperback edition shortly afterwards. A British hardcover appeared in 1954, with a paperback following in 1961. Paperback reissues of both the UK and US editions appeared in the mid-1960s. A French translation appeared in 1962 and an Italian translation in 1971.

== Contents ==
- "Or Else"* (Amazing Stories, 1953)
- "Home Is The Hunter"* (Galaxy, 1953)
- "By These Presents" (Fantastic, 1953)
- "De Profundis"* (as "The Visitors", Science Fiction Quarterly, 1953)
- "Camouflage"* (Astounding Stories, 1945)
- "Year Day" (original to collection)
- "Ghost" (Astounding Stories, 1943)
- "Shock"* (Astounding Stories, 1943)
- "Pile of Trouble" (Thrilling Wonder Stories, 1948)
- "Deadlock"* (Astounding Stories, 1942)

Stories marked with an asterisk (*) have been identified as collaborations by Kuttner and his wife, C. L. Moore.

== Reception ==
Boucher and McComas, describing Kuttner as "one of s.f.'s most literate and intelligent storytellers", found the collection to be "just about as good as the modern magazine science-fantasy story can get". P. Schuyler Miller similarly reported that Ahead of Time was "as good as any of the short-story collections now being published". New Worlds reviewer Leslie Flood described Ahead of Time as "excellent".
