= The SFWA Grand Masters, Volume 2 =

Anthology of science fiction short works

- Cover of first edition
- Author: edited by Frederik Pohl
- Language: English
- Genre: Science fiction
- Publisher: Tor Books
- Publication date: 2000
- Publication place: United States
- Media type: Print (hardcover)
- Pages: 432 pp.
- ISBN: 0-312-86879-0
- Preceded by: The SFWA Grand Masters, Volume 1
- Followed by: The SFWA Grand Masters, Volume 3

The SFWA Grand Masters, Volume 2 is an anthology of science fiction short works edited by Frederik Pohl. It was first published in hardcover by Tor Books in April 2000, and in trade paperback by the same publisher in April 2001. It has been translated into Italian.

The book collects twenty-three novellas, novelettes, short stories and essays by Andre Norton, Arthur C. Clarke, Isaac Asimov, Alfred Bester and Ray Bradbury, the sixth through tenth SFWA Grand Masters named by the Science Fiction and Fantasy Writers of America between 1984 and 1989, together with a general introduction and introductions and recommended reading lists for each Grand Master by the editor.

== Contents ==
- "Introduction" (Frederik Pohl)
- "Andre Norton" (Frederik Pohl)
  - "Recommended Reading by Andre Norton"
  - "Mousetrap" (Andre Norton)
  - "Were-Wrath" (Andre Norton)
  - "All Cats Are Gray" (Andre Norton)
  - "Serpent's Tooth" (Andre Norton)
- "Arthur C. Clarke b. 1917" (Frederik Pohl)
  - "Recommended Reading by Arthur C. Clarke"
  - "Rescue Party" (Arthur C. Clarke)
  - "The Secret" (Arthur C. Clarke)
  - "Reunion" (Arthur C. Clarke)
  - "The Star" (Arthur C. Clarke)
  - "A Meeting with Medusa" (Arthur C. Clarke)
- "Isaac Asimov 1920-1992" (Frederik Pohl)
  - "Recommended Reading by Isaac Asimov"
  - "The Last Question" (Isaac Asimov)
  - "It's Such a Beautiful Day" (Isaac Asimov)
  - "Strikebreaker" (Isaac Asimov)
  - "The Martian Way" (Isaac Asimov)
- "Alfred Bester 1913-1987" (Frederik Pohl)
  - "Recommended Reading by Alfred Bester"
  - "Disappearing Act" (Alfred Bester)
  - "Fondly Fahrenheit" (Alfred Bester)
  - "Comment on Fondly Fahrenheit" (Alfred Bester)
  - "The Four-Hour Fugue" (Alfred Bester)
  - "Hobson's Choice" (Alfred Bester)
- "Ray Bradbury b. 1920" (Frederik Pohl)
  - "Recommended Reading by Ray Bradbury"
  - "The City" (Ray Bradbury)
  - "The Million-Year Picnic" (Ray Bradbury)
  - "All Summer in a Day" (Ray Bradbury)
  - "There Will Come Soft Rains" (Ray Bradbury)
  - "The Affluence of Despair" (Ray Bradbury)
