= Northwest Smith =

Fictional character by C. L. Moore

Cover to a hardback edition of Northwest of Earth

Northwest Smith is a fictional character, and the hero of a series of stories by science fiction writer C. L. Moore.

== Story setting ==
Smith is a spaceship pilot and smuggler who lives in an undisclosed future time when humanity has colonized the Solar System.

The stories are set in a milieu common to science fiction stories of the pulp era. All of the planets of the system are able to support life and have their own civilizations. Many of the intelligent races living on the planets have comparatively primitive cultures. The relationship of the "planetary primitives" to the earth colonists is analogous to the situation of Native Americans, Africans and other indigenous people facing colonialism. Exceptions to this rule are the planets Mars and Venus, which Moore depicts as having ancient and decadent cultures (which might stand for China and other ancient Asian cultures, as they seemed to Westerners at the time). This general milieu was shared by a number of other writers, including Moore's friends Edmond Hamilton and Leigh Brackett.

== Character description ==
By profession, Smith is an outlaw who lives by a variety of criminal means, including smuggling. By nature, he is an anti-hero, ruthless, self-serving, and cynical. Despite this, he has a core of goodness and often does the right thing in spite of himself. Smith is described as a dark haired man with "space bronzed" skin and pale eyes, who wears brown spacer's leathers and carries a raygun at his side like an old west gunfighter. His ship, the Maid, is small and unspectacular but surprisingly fast and agile. His closest ally is the equally amoral Venusian, Yarol.

His stories often involve ancient alien beings who have been worshipped as gods. This theme is similar to the tales of H. P. Lovecraft though, unlike Lovecraft's tales, Moore provides a hero who always manages to win out over hopeless odds. The classic Northwest Smith story is "Shambleau", in which Moore plays with themes of sexuality and addiction in Smith's encounter with a strange female alien.

The story "Quest of the Starstone" is also worth noting because it connects Smith with Moore's other most famous character, Jirel of Joiry.

Moore originally created Smith as a western character and kept the name when she switched to science fiction. She reportedly liked the absurdity of a character named "Northwest" in space, where compass points are meaningless.

Moore traced the origin of the character's name to the typing work which she was doing for a living while writing Shambleau and which included a letter addressed to a "Mr. N.W.Smith." Moore admitted that the name of Smith's Venusian buddy, Yarol, was simply a permutation of the name of her favorite typewriter.

In the history of both the United States and Canada, the term "Northwest" recurs in various contexts, greatly variant with time and place but all carrying associations of wild frontier areas, exploration and adventure (Northwest Territory in early US history, North-Western Territory/Northwest Territories in Canada, Northwest Passage, North-West Rebellion and more).

Northwest Smith is sometimes compared to the Star Wars character Han Solo; both are violent, gun-wielding, rogue smugglers with hearts of gold who travel among planets that are stand-ins for existing Earth cultures.

== Story listing ==
The Northwest Smith stories include the following:

=== Primary stories ===
- "Shambleau" (Weird Tales, November 1933). On Mars, Northwest rescues a strange, beautiful girl from the Lakkdarol mob. They become very close - but in fact, she is not a girl, nor a human being at all, and the mob had a good reason to try to kill her...
- "Black Thirst" (Weird Tales, April 1934). A Minga woman invites Northwest into the forbidden Venusian fortress where she lives. It turns out to be even more dangerous than expected.
- "Scarlet Dream" (Weird Tales, May 1934). An oddly-patterned shawl that Northwest picks up in Lakkdarol gives him unpleasant dreams.
- "Dust of Gods" (Weird Tales, August 1934). Northwest and Yarol take a job searching for the physical remnants of a dead god in northern Mars.
- "Julhi" (Weird Tales, March 1935). Northwest takes a wrong turn in the ruins of Vonng, Venus.
- "The Cold Gray God" (Weird Tales, October 1935). In the polar city of Righa on Mars, Northwest meets a Venusian lady who isn't quite herself.
- "Yvala" (Weird Tales, February 1936). Northwest and Yarol go looking to capture slave-women on one of Jupiter's moons and find out more about themselves. The full text of Yvala at Wikisource
- "Lost Paradise" (Weird Tales, July 1936). A little old man with a big secret helps Northwest learn more about ancient Lunar history.
- "The Tree of Life" (Weird Tales, October 1936). In the ruins of Illar, Northwest finds out more about the Martian drylanders' past. The full text of The Tree of Life at Wikisource

=== Fanzine stories and collaborations ===
- "Nymph of Darkness" (Fantasy Magazine fanzine, April 1935; written with Forrest J. Ackerman)
- "Quest of the Starstone" (Weird Tales, November 1937; written with Henry Kuttner)
- "Werewoman" (Leaves fanzine, Winter 1938/39)
- "Song in a Minor Key" (Scienti-Snaps fanzine, February 1940). Northwest meditates on his own past life.

=== Collections ===
Northwest Smith stories appear in the following collections:

- Shambleau and Others (1953): "Shambleau", "Black Thirst", "The Tree of Life", "Scarlet Dream" (the collection also includes "Black God’s Kiss", "Black God’s Shadow" and "Jirel Meets Magic", three Jirel of Joiry stories)
- Northwest of Earth (1954): "Dust of Gods", "Julhi", "Lost Paradise", "The Cold Gray God", "Yvala" (the collection also includes "The Dark Land" and "Hellsgarde", two Jirel of Joiry stories)
- Scarlet Dream (1981): Published by Donald M. Grant, hardcover. "Shambleau", "Black Thirst", "The Tree of Life", "Scarlet Dream", "Dust of Gods", "Lost Paradise", "Julhi", "The Cold Gray God", "Yvala", and "Song in a Minor Key"
- Northwest Smith (1982): Published by Ace Books, paperback: Reprint of Scarlet Dream.
- Black Gods and Scarlet Dreams (2002): The same stories as Scarlet Dream, together with five stories of Jirel of Joiry.
- Northwest of Earth (2007): All of the Northwest Smith stories, both primary and fanzine/collaborations.
