= The Last Mimzy =

- Theatrical release poster
- Directed by: Robert Shaye
- Screenplay by: Bruce Joel Rubin; Toby Emmerich; James V. Hart; Carol Skilken
- Based on: "Mimsy Were the Borogoves" by Henry Kuttner; C.L. Moore
- Produced by: Michael Phillips
- Starring: Joely Richardson; Timothy Hutton; Michael Clarke Duncan; Rainn Wilson; Kathryn Hahn; Chris O'Neil; Rhiannon Leigh Wryn
- Cinematography: J. Michael Muro
- Edited by: Alan Heim
- Music by: Howard Shore
- Distributed by: New Line Cinema
- Release date: March 23, 2007
- Running time: 96 minutes
- Country: United States
- Language: English
- Budget: $35.5 million
- Box office: $27.5 million

The Last Mimzy is a 2007 American science fiction adventure drama film directed by New Line Cinema founder Robert Shaye. It was loosely based upon the 1943 science fiction short story "Mimsy Were the Borogoves" by Lewis Padgett (a pseudonym of husband-and-wife team Henry Kuttner and C. L. Moore). The film features Timothy Hutton, Joely Richardson, Rainn Wilson, Kathryn Hahn, Michael Clarke Duncan and introduces Rhiannon Leigh Wryn and Chris O’Neil as the main protagonists.

== Plot ==
A scientist in the distant future has set out to avert a catastrophic ecological disaster and sends a small number of high tech devices that resemble toys back in time to the 21st century. Ending up in Seattle, they are discovered by siblings Noah Wilder and his younger sister Emma. The "toys" are initially incomprehensible to them, other than one which appears to be a stuffed rabbit. The children keep their discovery a secret from their parents.

Emma becomes telepathically connected to the rabbit, naming it "Mimzy", which imparts knowledge onto her. The children gain genius-level intellects and psionic powers – Noah can teleport objects using a card-sized rectangle of green lines of light and a conch shell to control spiders, but thanks to her link, Emma develops more advanced abilities, becoming the only one who can use the "spinners", stones that can float and produce a force field. Emma describes herself as "the chosen one" but names Noah as "the engineer" without which she cannot "build the bridge to the future".

The children's parents and Larry White, Noah's science teacher, discover the devices and the children's powers. By mistake, Noah causes a power outage over half the state of Washington, alerting the FBI to their activities. The family is held for questioning by Agent Nathaniel Broadman, during which Mimzy is revealed as artificial life using nanotechnology created by Intel. Emma relates a dire message from Mimzy which states that many of her kind were sent into the past before, but none of them were able to return to their proper time period, because they lacked an "engineer" like Noah, and now Mimzy, the last one that the scientist was able to send back, is beginning to deteriorate.

To save the future, Mimzy must acquire a sample of uncorrupted human DNA to correct the damage done to DNA by ecological catastrophes. The FBI do not believe them, so Noah and Emma use their powers to escape. Mimzy absorbs a tear from Emma, which contains her DNA. Via the time portal that Noah constructs using the toys, Mimzy returns to the future, leaving a Sri Yantra symbol; Larry, who witnessed the event, says he saw "numbers", a reference to a dream he had that related to him winning lottery numbers he had missed out before by never buying a ticket.

In the future, Mimzy provides the genetic information required to restore humanity, both physically and mentally, with Emma coming to be dubbed "Our Mother" by the populace.

== Cast ==
- Joely Richardson as Jo Wilder
- Timothy Hutton as David Wilder
- Michael Clarke Duncan as Agent Nathaniel Broadman
- Kathryn Hahn as Naomi Schwartz
- Rainn Wilson as Larry White
- Chris O'Neil as Noah Wilder
  - Chris Sipe additionally portrays the character in certain scenes
- Rhiannon Leigh Wryn as Emma Wilder
  - Wryn additionally provides the voice of Mimzy.
- Patrick Gilmore as the FBI's task force agent
- Kirsten Williamson as Sheila Broadman
- Marc Musso as Harry Jones
- Megan McKinnon as Wendy
- Irene Snow as Lena, the story's narrator

=== Other characters ===
Mackenzie Hamilton and Calum Worthy have cameos as teenage cyborgs. Well-known string theorist Brian Greene has a cameo appearance as an Intel scientist.

== Development and production ==
The Last Mimzy is loosely based upon "Mimsy Were the Borogoves" by Lewis Padgett (the pen name of collaborators Henry Kuttner and C. L. Moore); the story appeared in John W. Campbell's magazine Astounding in 1943. The central idea of "toys" from the future being sent back in time and their alteration of the children's thought patterns remains, but with many differences. Originally, the transferral (from an unspecified date millions of years in the future) occurs by accident. The story makes the point that exposure to novel concepts would alter the children's perceptions "naturally" (irrespective of any intention on the part of the device's creator), since it would take place during an early phase of their intellectual development. Both the film's and short story's titles are derived from the third line of the nonsense verse poem "Jabberwocky" in Lewis Carroll's Through the Looking-Glass, and What Alice Found There. The adapted screenplay is by Bruce Joel Rubin and Toby Emmerich.

The film's production team also included editor Alan Heim and sound designer Dane Davis. Visual effects were created by The Orphanage, and location filming was done in Roberts Creek and Collingwood School.

== Re-release of the short story ==
The Last Mimzy: Stories, a retitled repackaging of the collection The Best of Henry Kuttner, was released in paperback, with a new title and cover art to tie in with the film. "Mimsy Were the Borogoves" led off the collection.

== Reception ==
=== Box office ===
The Last Mimzy grossed nearly $21.5 million in North America and $6.1 million in other countries for a worldwide total of $27.5 million,

=== Critical response ===
Critical response to The Last Mimzy was mixed. On review aggregator Rotten Tomatoes, the film has an approval rating of 55% based on 126 reviews, with an average score of 5.8/10. The site's critical consensus states, "The Last Mimzy makes efforts to be a fun children's movie, but unsuccessfully juggles too many genres and subplots—eventually settling as an unfocused, slightly dull affair" On Metacritic, the film had a score of 59 out of 100, based on 25 critics, indicating "mixed or average reviews". Audiences polled by CinemaScore gave the film an average grade of "B+" on an A+ to F scale.

Jeannette Catsoulis of The New York Times called it, "Wholesome, eager entertainment that doesn't talk down", agreeing with Ken Fox of TV Guide's Movie Guide who said it was "a thoughtful and sincere interpretation that actually get kids and their guardians thinking and talking." Calling the film "lightweight", the Atlanta Journal-Constitution rated it a "small gem". The Chicago Sun-Times went as far as to say The Last Mimzy is an "emotionless empty shell" compared to E.T. the Extra-Terrestrial.

Critics diverged regarding the scientific validity of the film. Reviewer Susan Granger said, "There's some validity to the challenging science depicted in the film, according to Brian Greene, Columbia University physics professor, and Susan Smalley, UCLA neurobehavioral genetics professor." By contrast, Rick Norwood (The SF Site) writes, "The Last Mimzy has carefully expunged all of the ideas from the story, and replaced them with the New Age nonsense that passes for ideas these days. They have also taken a very personal story about one family and a box of toys from the future and turned it into an epic story in which childlike innocence saves the human race".

== Soundtrack ==
The soundtrack for the film was composed by Howard Shore, the award-winning composer behind the scores of The Lord of the Rings film trilogy. Former Pink Floyd member Roger Waters also collaborated on a song called "Hello (I Love You)". "I think together we've come up with a song that captures the themes of the movie—the clash between humanity's best and worst instincts, and how a child's innocence can win the day", Roger Waters commented.

=== Track listing ===
No.	Title	Length
1.	"The Mandala"	1:37
2.	"Whidbey Island"	3:21
3.	"Under the Bed"	2:46
4.	"Cuddle"	1:28
5.	"Beach"	1:59
6.	"Scribbles"	2:39
7.	"Blackout"	3:17
8.	"Palm Readings"	4:12
9.	"I Love the World"	0:52
10.	"Help!"	1:20
11.	"I have to look"	4:20
12.	"Can I Talk?"	5:26
13.	"Eyes"	2:15
14.	"The Tear"	4:07
15.	"Through the Looking Glass"	5:03
16.	"Hello (I love You)" (with Roger Waters)	6:16

== Awards ==
Award	Category	Nominee	Result
Academy of Science Fiction, Fantasy & Horror Films	Best Performance by a Young Actor	Rhiannon Leigh Wryn	Nominated
Academy of Science Fiction, Fantasy & Horror Films	Best Science Fiction Film		Nominated
29th Young Artist Awards	Best Family Feature Film		Nominated
29th Young Artist Awards	Best Performance by a Leading Young Actor	Chris O'Neil	Nominated
29th Young Artist Awards	Best Performance by a Young Actress	Rhiannon Leigh Wryn	Nominated
29th Young Artist Awards	Best Performance by a Young Ensemble Cast	Chris O'Neil; Rhiannon Leigh Wryn; Marc Musso; Megan McKinnon; Nicole Muñoz	Nominated
