= Josua Heschel Kuttner =

Rabbi (c.1803–1878)

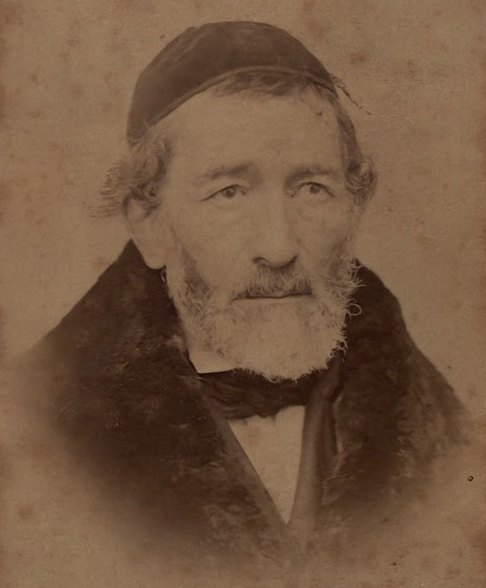
- Portrait

Personal life
- Born: February 7, 1802 Września, Wielkopolskie, Poland
- Died: July 5, 1878 (aged 76) Leszno, Wielkopolskie, Poland
- Occupation: Rabbi, writer

Religious life
- Religion: Judaism

Josua Heschel Kuttner or Kutner (Hebrew: יהושע העשיל קוטנר) (c.1803 – 5 July 1878) was a Jewish Orthodox scholar and rabbi.

He was born in Wreschen (Września) in the Grand Duchy of Posen, the son of Aron Kuttner and his wife Michle, a great-granddaughter of Rabbi Naphtali Cohen. Around 1830 he settled in Lissa (Leszno), where he acted as preacher and, since before 1850, as assessor of the rabbinate and rabbi. He died in Lissa.

His son, Naphtaly Kuttner (1829–1903), was the grandfather of science fiction author Henry Kuttner and politician Edgar C. Levey.

== Bibliography ==
- Ha-Emunah ve-he-Hakirah (Hebrew: האמונה והחקירה; Breslau, 1847). That work contains a philosophical discussion of the thirteen articles of belief of Maimonides, and extracts from the Haggadah and writings of ancient philosophers. Appended is an essay entitled Et La'asot, on the religious conditions prevalent in the author's day.
- Ha-Emunah ve-ha-Bitahon (Hebrew: האמונה והבטחון), in German: Glaube und Gottesvertrauen: oder: Practisches Lehrbuch der mosaischen Religion: Nebst Darstellung der aus ihren Geboten hervorgehenden, moralischen Lehren (Breslau, 1853). A bi-lingual, Hebrew-German work on faith and belief as derived from the Ten Commandments, in extracts translated and introduced by Rabbi Jacob Raphael Fürstenthal.
- Mishlei (Hebrew: משלי; Leipzig, 1865), as editor, with German translation and commentary.
