= Judgment Night (collection) =

1952 collection of short stories by C. L. Moore

- Dust-jacket from the first edition.
- Author: C. L. Moore
- Cover artist: Frank Kelly Freas
- Language: English
- Genre: Science fiction
- Publisher: Gnome Press
- Publication date: 1952
- Publication place: United States
- Media type: Print (hardback)
- Pages: 344

Judgment Night is a 1952 collection of science fiction stories by American writer C. L. Moore. It was first published by Gnome Press in 1952 in an edition of 4,000 copies. The collection contains the stories that Moore selected as the best of her longer work. The stories all originally appeared in the magazine Astounding SF.

== Contents ==
- "Judgment Night" (short novel)
- "Paradise Street" (novella)
- "Promised Land" (novelette)
- "The Code" (novelette)
- "Heir Apparent" (novelette)

== Reception ==
Reviewer Groff Conklin characterized Judgment Night as "a rich collection indeed -- varied, imagination-stretching, written without cheapness or shallowness." Boucher and McComas praised the title novel as "an opulent and exciting romance . . . written with the colorful warmth which one expects of Miss Moore." In 1970, Algis Budrys characterized the title novel as a "masterpiece."

== Sources ==
- Chalker, Jack L.; Mark Owings (1998). The Science-Fantasy Publishers: A Bibliographic History, 1923-1998. Westminster, MD and Baltimore: Mirage Press, Ltd. pp. 300–301.
- Electronic edition at Singularity&Co.
- Contento, William G. "Index to Science Fiction Anthologies and Collections". Archived from the original on 2008-06-28.
