= Laurence D'Orsay =

American writer

Laurence R. D'Orsay (8 November 1887 – 21 November 1947) was an American writer of several instruction books for writers, a critic and literary agent in Los Angeles, California.

Laurence Rex D'Orsay was born Leopold Alexander Thalmayer in Vienna, Austria, in 1887, the son of an Austrian father and an English mother. He arrived in the US in 1916, where he changed his name to Laurence Thalmore. Since the mid-1920s he published his fiction and non-fiction in diverse magazines under the pen name Laurence R. D'Orsay, e.g., in Weird Tales, The Writer's Monthly, Writer's Digest.

Laurence D'Orsay was married to Nordica Abbott (1902–1969); they had a son, Kenneth Edward D'Orsay (1923–1972). He died in Los Angeles in 1947.

The author Henry Kuttner worked for D'Orsay's literary agency in the mid-1930s, before selling his first stories. Another well-known author, Leigh Brackett, began her writing career by attending a writing course with Laurence D'Orsay.

== Partial bibliography ==
Non-Fiction:

- Landing the Editors' Checks: Writing and selling your story. Kansas City, MO: Burton Publishing Co., 1928.
- Writing Novels To Sell. Cincinnati, OH, 1930.
- The Profit in Writing: A volume of definite, practical, how-to-do-it advice for the building of salable stories. Los Angeles, CA: Parker, Stone & Baird Co., 1934 (several editions).
- Stories You Can Sell: A volume of collected stories of various acceptable types, with explanatory analyses by the author, showing how plots may be obtained and stories written and sold by the reader. Los Angeles, Parker, Stone & Baird Co., 1935 (several editions).

Short stories:

- "Phantoms", in: Weird Tales, January 1925.
- "The Spirit of It", in: Short Stories, 25 January 1925.
- "Marble", in: Weird Tales, June, 1925.
- "The Stamp of Courtesy", in: Clues, October 1926.
- "Jewels for Two" (with F. L. Grant), in: Clues, December, 1926.
- "The Price of Empire", in: Soldiers of Fortune, May, 1932.

Novel

- Mistress of Spears: A Tale of Amazulu. Kansas City, MO: Burton, 1930.
