= Valley of the Flame =

1946 novel by Henry Kuttner

First book edition (published by Ace Books in 1964). Cover art by Ed Emshwiller.

Valley of the Flame is a fantasy novel by American writer Henry Kuttner, first published in the March 1946 issue of the magazine Startling Stories under the pseudonym "Keith Hammond".

== Plot summary ==
The year is 1985 and the location is somewhere in the vast, teeming jungles of the Amazon. Medical scientist Brian Raft and his two colleagues Dan Craddock and Bill Merriday are working at a small, newly built health center, researching tropical diseases. They are the only white men in the vicinity and are the last outpost of civilization. Somewhere deeper in the jungle drums have been beating for days and Craddock seems convinced that they are not beating a message, rather that they have some other, more sinister purpose. Craddock, despite his medical training, is a superstitious man "with his Welsh ghosts and his shadow-people of the lost centuries", so Raft does not take much notice of him. But soon out of the unknown comes a canoe propelled by two men with paddles. They have been working themselves to the point of almost complete exhaustion. One of these newcomers, Thomas Da Fonseca, proves to be a pilot on a mapping expedition whose plane has crashed near the second man's property. This second man, Paulo da Costa Pereira, is of indeterminate origin; he speaks Portuguese, but in a faulty manner, and carries himself in a kind of confident, haughty, evasive way that annoys Raft. Da Fonseca is sick, with a temperature far below normal, and appears to have some tropical disease. Pereira, on the other hand, seems to recover remarkably quickly. Nevertheless, Raft insists, against Pereira's will, on taking a blood sample to be certain of his health. Pereira's blood seems to be strangely mutated. If anything, it works in a superior way to normal blood. Raft overhears Pereira talking to Craddock, then suddenly these two disappear. They are seen by Merriday departing in the Center's motorboat. Craddock seems to be under the hypnotic spell of Pereira. The next morning Raft, with five natives, sets out up the river in pursuit. Raft's journey will ultimately take him to the Valley of the Flame.

== Reception ==
The book was reviewed by Robert Silverberg for Fantastic Stories of Imagination, March 1965 issue.

Writing in Fantasy: The 100 Best Books, James Cawthorn and Michael Moorcock noted that in the book "Kuttner devised one of the most amazing lost cultures".
