= Robots Have No Tails =

1952 collection of science fiction short stories by Lewis Padgett

- Dust-jacket from the first edition
- Author: Lewis Padgett
- Cover artist: Ric Binkley
- Language: English
- Genre: Science fiction
- Publisher: Gnome Press
- Publication date: 1952
- Publication place: United States
- Media type: Print (hardback)
- Pages: 224

Robots Have No Tails is a 1952 collection of science fiction short stories by Lewis Padgett (pseudonym of American writers Henry Kuttner and C. L. Moore). It was first published by Gnome Press in 1952 in an edition of 4,000 copies. The stories all originally appeared in the magazine Astounding Stories.

It has been reprinted in 1973 by Lancer books with an introduction by C.L. Moore; in 1983 in the UK by Hamlyn Books as The Proud Robot with an introduction by Peter Pinto; and lastly in 2009 in the US by Paizo Publishing LLC's Planet Stories line of books, with an additional introduction (to the one of Catherine Moore) by F. Paul Wilson. Both later editions credit Henry Kuttner as being the author, as does the introduction by C.L. Moore in the 1973 and 2009 editions.

== Contents ==
- "The Proud Robot"
- "Gallegher Plus"
- "The World Is Mine"
- "Ex Machina"
- "Time Locker"

== Reception ==
Groff Conklin wrote in his Galaxy review column that Robots Have No Tails was not good science fiction, but "zany imaginings of a rather anti-scientific sort." Boucher and McComas praised the collection as "a great joy.". P. Schuyler Miller praised the stories as "pure entertainment, lavishly applied."

== Sources ==
- Chalker, Jack L.; Mark Owings (1998). The Science-Fantasy Publishers: A Bibliographic History, 1923-1998. Westminster, MD and Baltimore: Mirage Press, Ltd. p. 299.
- Contento, William G. "Index to Science Fiction Anthologies and Collections". Archived from the original on 2011-07-11.
- Reginald, Robert; Mary A. Burgess; Daryl F. Mallett (1992). Science Fiction and Fantasy Literature, 1975-1991: A Bibliography of Science Fiction, Fantasy, and Horror Fiction Books and Nonfiction Monographs. Detroit, MI: Gale Research Inc. pp. 1512. ISBN 9780810318250.
