= The SFWA Grand Masters, Volume 3 =

- Cover of first edition
- Author: edited by Frederik Pohl
- Language: English
- Genre: Science fiction
- Publisher: Tor Books
- Publication date: 2001
- Publication place: United States
- Media type: Print (hardcover)
- Pages: 477 pp.
- ISBN: 0-312-86877-4
- Preceded by: The SFWA Grand Masters, Volume 2

The SFWA Grand Masters, Volume 3 is an anthology of science fiction short works edited by Frederik Pohl. It was first published in hardcover by Tor Books in June 2001, and in trade paperback by the same publisher in April 2002. It has been translated into Italian.

The book collects twenty novellas, novelettes and short stories by Lester del Rey, Frederik Pohl, Damon Knight, A. E. van Vogt and Jack Vance, the eleventh through fifteenth SFWA Grand Masters named by the Science Fiction and Fantasy Writers of America between 1991 and 1997, together with a general introduction and introductions and recommended reading lists for each Grand Master, in most instances by the editor, but in his case (he being one of the honorees) by his wife, Elizabeth Anne Hull.

== Contents ==
- "Introduction" (Frederik Pohl)
- "Lester del Rey 1915-1993" (Frederik Pohl)
  - "Recommended Reading by Lester del Rey"
  - "The Faithful" (Lester del Rey)
  - "The Pipes of Pan" (Lester del Rey)
  - "The Coppersmith" (Lester del Rey)
  - "For I Am a Jealous People!" (Lester del Rey)
- "Frederik Pohl b. 1919" (Elizabeth Anne Hull)
  - "Recommended Reading" (Frederik Pohl)
  - "Let the Ants Try" (Frederik Pohl)
  - "The Tunnel Under the World" (Frederik Pohl)
  - "Day Million" (Frederik Pohl)
  - "The Gold at the Starbow's End" (Frederik Pohl)
- "Damon Knight" (Frederik Pohl)
  - "Recommended Reading by Damon Knight"
  - "The Handler" (Damon Knight)
  - "Dio" (Damon Knight)
  - "Not With a Bang" (Damon Knight)
  - "I See You" (Damon Knight)
  - "Masks" (Damon Knight)
- "A. E. van Vogt 1912-2000" (Frederik Pohl)
  - "Recommended Reading by A. E. van Vogt"
  - "Black Destroyer" (A. E. van Vogt)
  - "Far Centaurus" (A. E. van Vogt)
  - "Vault of the Beast" (A. E. van Vogt)
  - "Dear Pen Pal" (A. E. van Vogt)
- "Jack Vance b. 1916" (Frederik Pohl)
  - "Recommended Reading by Jack Vance"
  - "Sail 25" (Jack Vance)
  - "Ullward's Retreat" (Jack Vance)
  - "The Miracle Workers" (Jack Vance)
