= Living Fossil (short story) =

- Short story by L. Sprague de Camp
- Charles Schneeman's illustration of the story in Astounding Science-Fiction
- Country: United States
- Language: English
- Genre: Science fiction

Publication
- Published in: Astounding Science-Fiction
- Publisher: Street & Smith Publications, Inc.
- Media type: Print (Magazine)
- Publication date: February, 1939

"Living Fossil" is a science fiction story by American writer L. Sprague de Camp, on the concepts of human extinction and future evolution. It was first published in the magazine Astounding Science-Fiction for February 1939. It first appeared in book form in the anthology A Treasury of Science Fiction (Crown Publishers, 1948); it later appeared in the anthologies Gates to Tomorrow (Atheneum, 1973), and The SFWA Grand Masters, Volume 1 (Tor Books, 1999). The story has been translated into Danish, Swedish and Italian.

It is perhaps the earliest work of fiction dealing with the afterwards popular theme of humanity being replaced by other intelligent primates in the future, later epitomized by Pierre Boulle's Planet of the Apes.

== Plot summary ==
In the far future (perhaps five to ten million years from now), humans and much of the world's fauna have gone extinct, and new creatures have evolved from the remaining species to take their places. Jmu, intelligent primates evolved from capuchin monkeys, now fill the niche left by humans, giant agoutis that of horses, giant tapirs that of elephants. There are also giant rabbits. Other animals, like bears, lions, deer, geese, ducks, snakes, dragonflies, grasshoppers, fleas and mayflies, continue to survive in their previous ecological roles. It is a world of depleted resources, much of these having been used up by humans, but the Jmu have developed to a fairly high level their own technology, including aeronautical balloons, rifles, binoculars and cameras.

Two Jmu from South America, zoologist Nawputta and his guide Chujee, an amateur naturalist, are exploring what was once the Pittsburgh area of North America's Eastern Forest. Their goal is to catalogue new species and investigate the scant, ruinous remains of human civilization. They encounter Nguchoy tsu Chaw, a timber scout for the local Jmu colony. He is alone; his own partner, Jawga tsu Shrra, was recently killed by a rattlesnake. Nguchoy treats the newcomers with suspicion, but he helpfully steers them towards a huge stand of valuable pine.

In the pine forest the scientists happen upon fresh bones that Nawputta excitedly identifies as human, previously only known from fossils. They appear to have been shot by Jmu. Later, Nawputta manages to shoot a live specimen, a primitive armed with a wooden club, which he proceeds to skin and dissect in the interest of science. Discovered by other humans, he and Chujee hastily retreat as they rouse the countryside with signal drums and the whole tribe hunts them with spears. The Jmu drive the tribe off with gunfire and escape a subsequent ambush. They outdistance pursuit, but the humans are still on their trail.

Nawputta and Chujee rendezvous back at Nguchoy's camp, finding him absent. Ruminating on previous suspicions, they reason the timber scout encountered the humans first and stirred them up by murdering the man whose remains they had initially found. He then directed his fellow Jmu into the same area, intending they meet their own deaths at the hands of the angered humans, leaving him sole, undisputed claim to the valuable timber. In this light, it also occurs to them that the death of Nguchoy's partner came at a most convenient time for him. They locate the grave of Jawga and find he died by gunshot, not snakebite.

On Nguchoy's return, they surprise the scout, who confesses. They thereupon confiscate his canoe and depart down river, leaving him alone to face the vengeance of the approaching humans. Nawputta plans to return to South America before the local colonists rediscover and despoil the forest, hoping to have the human habitat set aside as a preserve for these living fossils.

== Reception ==
John K. Aiken, in his review of the anthology A Treasury of Science Fiction, included "Living Fossil" in "the dozen or more ... first-class stories it boasts."

Critics Alexei and Cory Panshin have noted the environmentalist subtext of the story, noting that it suggests "that our fall came to pass not through the operation of some iron law of growth and decay, but rather as the result of a multiplicity of human failings, not the least of which was abuse of the environment. ... But for de Camp, mankind was by no means inevitably doomed. There was an obvious way forward, and that was for us to embrace nature, and not to rebel against it."

== Relation to other works ==
The plot feature of other primates taking the place of an extinct humanity in the far future is also explored in de Camp's novel Genus Homo (1950), written in collaboration with P. Schuyler Miller. Another use of intelligent non-human primates can be found in de Camp's later short story "The Blue Giraffe" (1939). The resolving device of a scientist engineering the death of a greedy antagonist in defense of science is echoed in his later short story "In-Group" (1952).
