= The SFWA Grand Masters, Volume 1 =

- Cover of first edition
- Editor: Frederik Pohl
- Language: English
- Genre: Science fiction
- Publisher: Tor Books
- Publication date: 1999
- Publication place: United States
- Media type: Print (hardcover)
- Pages: 384 pp.
- ISBN: 0-312-86881-2
- Followed by: The SFWA Grand Masters, Volume 2

The SFWA Grand Masters, Volume 1 is an anthology of science fiction short works edited by Frederik Pohl. It was first published in hardcover by Tor Books in June 1999, and in trade paperback by the same publisher in August 2001. It has been translated into Italian.

The book collects eighteen novelettes, short stories and essays by Robert A. Heinlein, Jack Williamson, Clifford D. Simak, L. Sprague de Camp and Fritz Leiber, the five initial SFWA Grand Masters named by the Science Fiction and Fantasy Writers of America between 1975 and 1981, together with a general introduction and introductions and recommended reading lists for each Grand Master by the editor.

== Contents ==
- "Introduction" (Frederik Pohl)
- "Robert A. Heinlein 1907-1988" (Frederik Pohl)
  - "The Roads Must Roll" (Robert A. Heinlein)
  - "The Year of the Jackpot" (Robert A. Heinlein)
  - "Jerry Was a Man" (Robert A. Heinlein)
  - "The Farthest Place" (excerpt from Tramp Royale) (Robert A. Heinlein)
  - "The Long Watch" (Robert A. Heinlein)
  - "Recommended Reading by Robert A. Heinlein"
- "Jack Williamson b. 1908" (Frederik Pohl)
  - "With Folded Hands ..." (Jack Williamson)
  - "Jamboree" (Jack Williamson)
  - "The Mañana Literary Society" (excerpt from Wonder's Child: My Life in Science Fiction) (Jack Williamson)
  - "The Firefly Tree" (Jack Williamson)
  - "Recommended Reading by Jack Williamson"
- "Clifford D. Simak 1904-1988" (Frederik Pohl)
  - "Desertion" (Clifford D. Simak)
  - "Founding Father" (Clifford D. Simak)
  - "Grotto of the Dancing Deer" (Clifford D. Simak)
  - "Recommended Reading by Clifford D. Simak"
- "L. Sprague de Camp b. 1907" (Frederik Pohl)
  - "A Gun for Dinosaur" (L. Sprague de Camp)
  - "Little Green Men from Afar" (L. Sprague de Camp)
  - "Living Fossil" (L. Sprague de Camp)
  - "Recommended Reading by L. Sprague de Camp"
- "Fritz Leiber 1910-1992" (Frederik Pohl)
  - "Sanity" (Fritz Leiber)
  - "The Mer She" (Fritz Leiber)
  - "A Bad Day for Sales" (Fritz Leiber)
  - "Recommended Reading by Fritz Leiber"
