= The Book of Iod =

First edition, cover art by Earl Geier

The Book of Iod is a collection of short stories by Henry Kuttner published by Chaosium in 1995.

== Plot summary ==
The Book of Iod is part of the Cthulhu Cycle Books series from Chaosium, and includes eleven stories by Kuttner originally published from 1936 to 1939, as well as one story by editor Robert M. Price and another story by Lin Carter.

== Reception ==
Steve Faragher reviewed The Book of iod for Arcane magazine, rating it an 8 out of 10 overall. Faragher comments that "Rather a fine collection of stories [...] Kuttner was a young man profoundly influenced by HP Lovecraft, who became a member of the Lovecraft circle in the year before the Grand Old Man of Horror died."

== Review ==
- Review by Stephen Theaker (2015) in Theaker's Quarterly Fiction, #51
