= Jinx Beers =

American activist and editor (1933–2018)

- Jinx Beers, from the 1951 Pasadena Community College yearbook
- Born: Clara Jean Beers; October 12, 1933; Pasadena, California
- Died: October 4, 2018 (aged 84); Los Angeles, California
- Occupations: Activist, journalist, editor, member of the US Air Force
- Known for: Founder, The Lesbian News
- Partner: Alicia Austin

Jinx Beers (October 12, 1933 – October 4, 2018), born Clara Jean Beers, was an American activist and editor. She was founder of The Lesbian News, the longest-running newspaper for the lesbian community in the United States. She was also a United States Air Force veteran, a scientist studying driver impairment, an art gallery director, and a mystery writer.

== Early life and education ==
Beers was born in Pasadena, the youngest of five children born to William Earl Beers and Frances Edith Woodley Beers. She attended Pasadena Junior College in 1951. After her service in the United States Air Force, she used the G. I. Bill to earn a bachelor's degree in psychology at the University of California, Los Angeles (UCLA).

== Career ==
Beers served in the United States Air Force, stationed in Germany from 1951 to 1955, and at the USAF Hospital in Long Beach; after her honorable discharge she served in the Air Force Reserve Command for another twelve years. She worked at the Institute of Transportation and Traffic Engineering at UCLA for 18 years, studying driver alertness and fatigue, impaired drivers, signage, and safety. She taught a 1970 course in UCLA's Experimental College titled "The Lesbian Experience". She was active in many protests, demonstrations, and other community activities in Los Angeles, and was a member of the National Organization of Women's Lesbian Rights Task Force.

In 1975, Beers founded The Lesbian News (also known as LN or TLN), a free monthly publication for the lesbian community in Southern California. LN included community announcements, interviews, practical advice, and reviews. Beers' editorial policy was explicitly anti-racist, anti-ageist, anti-sexist, and anti-violence. “I never planned to have a publication. I had to learn everything along the way,” she said later. In 1989, she sold LN and began another periodical, LSF: Lesbian Short Fiction.

In 1986, Beers became director of Pendragon Gallery, "the only gallery on the West Coast devoted exclusively to the science fiction and fantasy genre." In 2009, she published an autobiography, Memoirs of an Old Dyke, with proceeds supporting the June L. Mazer Lesbian Archives. In 2013, she gave an oral history interview to the Mazer Archives. She also wrote mystery stories, and was a member of the Los Angeles chapter of Sister in Crime. After her death she left everything she had left to the June l. Mazer Lesbian Archives where her library is also kept.

== Awards and honors ==
Beers received the Community Service Award from Southern California Women for Understanding. In 1987, she received the Dick Michaels Media Award from Christopher Street West. She was named the Long Beach Lambda Democratic Club's Woman of the Year in 1990. In 2009, the Lesbian & Gay Advisory Board of West Hollywood presented Beers with the Rainbow Key Award, and the City of West Hollywood presented her with the Etheridge Award. In 2017, Beers was inducted into the LGBTQ Journalists Hall of Fame in Philadelphia.

== Personal life ==
Beers and artist Alicia Austin were partners. Beers died from renal failure in 2018, aged 84 years, at a senior living facility in Los Angeles. Her papers are archived in the Special Collections Library at UCLA.
