= Timescape (1992 film) =

Grand Tour: Disaster in Time
- Directed by: David Twohy
- Screenplay by: David Twohy
- Based on: "Vintage Season" by Lawrence O'Donnell (Henry Kuttner and C. L. Moore)
- Produced by: John A. O'Connor
- Starring: Jeff Daniels; Ariana Richards; Marilyn Lightstone
- Cinematography: Harry Mathias
- Edited by: Ed McNichol; Glenn Morgan
- Music by: Gerald Gouriet
- Production companies: Channel Communications; Drury Lane Holdings; Wild Street Pictures
- Distributed by: Academy Entertainment
- Release date: May 9, 1992
- Running time: 99 minutes
- Country: United States
- Language: English

Timescape, released on video as Grand Tour: Disaster in Time, is a 1992 American science fiction film directed by David Twohy and starring Jeff Daniels and Ariana Richards, with a cameo appearance by Robert Colbert, one of the co-stars of Irwin Allen's 1960s TV series The Time Tunnel. Twohy wrote the screenplay, which is loosely based on the 1946 novella Vintage Season by Henry Kuttner and C. L. Moore (writing as Lawrence O'Donnell). It was re-released in 2023 on Blu-ray by Unearthed Films with the title The Grand Tour.

== Plot ==
The grieving widower Ben Wilson is renovating an old guest house on the outskirts of his hometown with his young daughter, Hillary. The local bus driver, Oscar, arrives with a group of peculiarly behaved and dressed tourists, who insist on staying at the remote guest house, instead of the town center's large hotel. When Ben aids one of the tourists, Quish, after a minor accident, he discovers that Quish's passport is inexplicably stamped with locations, dated decades apart, that correspond to famous disasters, including the 1906 San Francisco earthquake, the crash of the Hindenburg, and the 1980 eruption of Mount St. Helens. Ben confronts Quish, who responds only by warning Ben to leave town. Meanwhile, Ben's vengeful father-in-law, Judge Caldwell, who blames Ben for his daughter's death, has Ben declared an unfit parent and takes custody of Hillary.

One of the tourists, Reeve, confirms Ben's suspicions about their true nature: They are time-travelers from the future who visit famous disasters from their past. She drugs and seduces Ben and leaves him unconscious. Oscar finds and revives him. As they attempt to confront the tourists at the guest house, a meteorite strike devastates the town. Ben finds Hillary alive at Caldwell's house, and they spend the night and help survivors while the tourists stroll through the devastation in detached fascination. The next day, Ben realizes that the tourists are still in town. He deduces that they are awaiting a second disaster, which will soon affect the Greenglen Elementary School, where the schools gymnasium is being used as an emergency shelter. Ben rushes out of the warehouse and towards the school in an attempt to save Hillary, barely escaping from the tourists who were trying to capture him to keep him from intervening with the spectacle.

Meanwhile, in the schools boiler room, some maintenance workers who were servicing the boiler accidentally detached a gas line causing a leak. As Ben arrives in the lobby of the school, the leaking gas seeped thru a vent to the gymnasium and onto a hurricane lamp causing a massive explosion, destroying the building and killing most of the people inside including Hillary and Quish, who had followed Ben inside. The tourists take Ben prisoner so that an official from their time, the Undersecretary, can investigate and attempt to mend Ben's "timescape." After Ben accuses Reeve of lacking humanity, she slips him Quish's passport, which conceals a time travel device.

Ben travels to the previous evening. He tries to remove Hillary from Caldwell's house, but is caught and arrested. Using his one phone call, he contacts his pre-existing self before Reeve can incapacitate him. Ben's earlier self helps him escape from the jail, and together, the two Bens draw most of town's residents to safety at a church on the other side of town by ringing the church bells to the tune of Für Elise, his wife's favorite piece of music. Leaving Hillary with his earlier self, Ben meets with the Undersecretary to return to his original timeframe. He warns Ben not to interfere any further and threatens to reset the timeline. Ben calls his bluff since the Undersecretary would have already done so if he had the ability.

Some time later, Hillary takes bookings for the completed guest house while Ben reads through old love letters from his late wife. When Hillary looks up, Ben has vanished, and Hillary hears someone playing Für Elise on the piano.

== Cast ==
- Jeff Daniels as Ben Wilson
- Ariana Richards as Hillary Wilson
- Emilia Crow as Reeve
- Jim Haynie as Oscar
- Marilyn Lightstone as Madame Iovine
- George Murdock as Judge Caldwell
- David Wells as Quish
- Nicholas Guest as Spall
- Robert Colbert as Undersecretary
- Time Winters as Reverend
- Anna Neill as Sue Appleton
- Willie Rack as Billy Appleton
- Mimi Craven as Carolyn
- Jacquie McClure as Mrs. Beecher
- Steven Gilborn as Doctor
