= Gates to Tomorrow =

1973 anthology edited by Andre Norton and Ernestine Donaldy

- Cover of first edition
- Author: edited by Andre Norton and Ernestine Donaldy
- Cover artist: Jack Gaughan
- Language: English
- Genre: Science fiction short stories
- Publisher: Atheneum Books
- Publication date: 1973
- Publication place: United States
- Media type: Print (hardcover)
- Pages: 264 pp.
- ISBN: 0-689-30321-1

Gates to Tomorrow: An Introduction to Science Fiction is an anthology of science fiction short works edited by Andre Norton and Ernestine Donaldy. It was first published in hardcover by Atheneum Books in April 1973.

The book collects twelve novelettes and short stories by various authors, together with an introduction by the editors.

== Contents ==
- "Introduction" (Andre Norton and Ernestine Donaldy)
- "Shape" (Robert Sheckley)
- "Rust" (Joseph E. Kelleam)
- "Command" (Bernard I. Kahn)
- "The Naming of Names" (Ray Bradbury)
- "The Plague" (Keith Laumer)
- "A Pail of Air" (Fritz Leiber)
- "Living Fossil" (L. Sprague de Camp)
- "The Flame Midget" (Frank Belknap Long, Jr.)
- "Expedition Polychrome" (J. A. Winter, M.D.)
- "Untouched by Human Hands" (Robert Sheckley)
- "Ultimatum" (Keith Laumer)
- "The Sheriff of Canyon Gulch" (Gordon Dickson and Poul Anderson)
