= Alicia Austin's Age of Dreams =

1978 collection of drawings written and illustrated by Alicia Austin

- Dust-jacket from the first edition
- Author: Alicia Austin
- Illustrator: Alicia Austin
- Cover artist: Alicia Austin
- Language: English
- Subject: Alicia Austin
- Publisher: Donald M. Grant, Publisher, Inc.
- Publication date: 1978
- Publication place: United States
- Media type: Print (Hardback)
- Pages: 143 pp
- OCLC: 4597763

Alicia Austin's Age of Dreams is a collection of drawings written and illustrated by Alicia Austin. It was published in 1978 by Donald M. Grant, Publisher, Inc. in an edition of 2,000 copies, of which 200 were bound in buckram, and signed by Austin. The book contains an introduction by George Barr, and an afterword by Austin.
