= Damon Knight Memorial Grand Master Award =

Award

- Awarded for: Excellence in science fiction and fantasy writing, literary achievements
- Country: United States
- Presented by: Science Fiction and Fantasy Writers Association
- First award: 1974
- Website: sfwa.org

The Damon Knight Memorial Grand Master Award is a lifetime honor presented annually by the Science Fiction and Fantasy Writers Association (SFWA) to a living writer of fantasy or science fiction. It was first awarded in 1975, to Robert Heinlein. In 2002, it was renamed after Damon Knight, the founder of SFWA, who had died that year.

The presentation is made at the annual SFWA Nebula Awards banquet, commonly during May, but it is not one of the Nebulas, which recognize the preceding calendar year's works and are selected by vote of all Association members. The Grand Master selection is made by the current president; there is no jury or formal nomination procedure or voting. Per the SFWA Operations, Policies, and Procedures Manual, version 2.0 (the most recent as of 2026): "The Damon Knight Memorial Grand Master Award is given by SFWA for ‘lifetime achievement in science fiction and/or fantasy.’ In consultation with the Past Presidents and the SFWA Board, the President bestows this honor on an individual who has shown immeasurable talent and achievement."

From 1995 to 2010, SFWA also gave some writers the title of Author Emeritus. In 2023, SFWA announced the creation of the Infinity Award, which posthumously honors creators who died before they could be considered for the Grand Master Award. The first recipient of the Infinity Award was Octavia E. Butler.

== History ==
The first Grand Master, Robert Heinlein, was named in 1975. The Grand Master Award was originally limited to six recipients per decade; six were presented in the ten years to 1984 and twelve in the twenty years to 1994. From 1995, the award has been conferred annually, with the exception of 2002 and 2011. Andre Norton was the first woman to receive the award, in 1984. As of 2025, N.K. Jemisin is the youngest person to have received the award; she was aged 53.

From 1995 to 2010, SFWA also awarded the title of Author Emeritus "as a way to recognize and appreciate senior writers in the genres of science fiction and fantasy who have made significant contributions to our field but who are no longer active or whose excellent work may no longer be as widely known as it once was." Recipients were invited to speak at the annual Nebula Awards banquet. Fourteen honorees were named in the sixteen years the award was given. As of 2024, there has been no overlap between Grand Masters and Authors Emeritus. The award's status as a consolation prize was a matter of controversy.

== Grand Masters ==
As of 2025, 42 Grand Masters have been created. The list below shows the year of the award ceremonies for each respective recipient. Awards are announced in advance of the ceremony, sometimes in the preceding year.

Year	Recipient	Ref.
1975	Robert A. Heinlein (1907–1988)	
1976	Jack Williamson (1908–2006)	
1977	Clifford D. Simak (1904–1988)	
1978	—	
1979	L. Sprague de Camp (1907–2000)	
1980	—	
1981	Fritz Leiber (1910–1992)	
1982	—	
1983	—	
1984	Andre Norton (1912–2005)	
1985	—	
1986	Arthur C. Clarke (1917–2008)	
1987	Isaac Asimov (1920–1992)	
1988	Alfred Bester (1913–1987)	
1989	Ray Bradbury (1920–2012)	
1990	—	
1991	Lester del Rey (1915–1993)	
1992	—	
1993	Frederik Pohl (1919–2013)	
1994	—	
1995	Damon Knight (1922–2002)	
1996	A. E. van Vogt (1912–2000)	
1997	Jack Vance (1916–2013)	
1998	Poul Anderson (1926–2001)	
1999	Hal Clement (1922–2003)	
2000	Brian W. Aldiss (1925–2017)	
2001	Philip José Farmer (1918–2009)	
2002	—	
2003	Ursula K. Le Guin (1929–2018)	
2004	Robert Silverberg (1935–)	
2005	Anne McCaffrey (1926–2011)	
2006	Harlan Ellison (1934–2018)	
2007	James Gunn (1923–2020)	
2008	Michael Moorcock (1939–)	
2009	Harry Harrison (1925–2012)	
2010	Joe Haldeman (1943–)	
2011	—	
2012	Connie Willis (1945–)	
2013	Gene Wolfe (1931–2019)	
2014	Samuel R. Delany (1942–)	
2015	Larry Niven (1938–)	
2016	C. J. Cherryh (1942–)	
2017	Jane Yolen (1939–2026)	
2018	Peter S. Beagle (1939–)	
2019	William Gibson (1948–)	
2020	Lois McMaster Bujold (1949–)	
2021	Nalo Hopkinson (1960–)	
2022	Mercedes Lackey (1950–)	
2023	Robin McKinley (1952–)	
2024	Susan Cooper (1935–)	
2025	Nicola Griffith (1960–)	
2026	N.K. Jemisin (1972–)	
2027	Nancy Kress (1948-)	

== Infinity Award ==
In 2023, SFWA announced the creation of the Infinity Award, which posthumously honors creators who died before they could be considered for the Grand Master Award. SFWA President Jeffe Kennedy said, "Over the years, so many creators have been passed over for the Grand Master nod, for one reason or another. Some died tragically early. Others were not recognized for their work during their lifetimes because of cultural prejudices and blind spots."

Year	Recipient	Ref.
2023	Octavia E. Butler (1947–2006)	
2024	Tanith Lee (1947–2015)	
2025	Frank Herbert (1920–1986)	
2026	Roger Zelazny (1937–1995)	

== Anthologies ==
In 1989, the anthology Grand Masters' Choice was published, edited by Andre Norton and Ingrid Zierhut. Three more anthologies honoring recipients of the Grand Master Award and collecting some of their short works have been published: The SFWA Grand Masters, Volume 1 (1999), The SFWA Grand Masters, Volume 2 (2000), and The SFWA Grand Masters, Volume 3 (2001), all edited by Frederik Pohl. Collectively, they honor the first fifteen recipients of the award.

== See also ==
- The Gandalf Grand Master Award for life achievement in fantasy writing, awarded annually by the World Science Fiction Society (1974 to 1981)
- World Fantasy Award for Life Achievement
