= Earth's Last Citadel =

1943 novel by C.L. Moore

First book edition (publ. Ace Books). Cover art by Alex Schomburg.

Earth's Last Citadel is a science fiction novel written by the American husband and wife team of C. L. Moore and Henry Kuttner. It was first published in 1943 in the magazine Argosy and in book form it was published first in 1964.

== Plot ==
During World War II, four people (two belonging to the Allies, two to the Axis) find a strange vehicle in the Tunisian desert. It whisks them to the far future where the Earth has been conquered and mankind is nearly extinct.

== Sources ==
- Clute, John and John Grant. The Encyclopedia of Fantasy. London: Orbit Books, 1997. ISBN 978-1-85723-368-1.
