= Mimsy Were the Borogoves =

"Mimsy Were the Borogoves..."
- Short story by Lewis Padgett
- Country: United States
- Language: English
- Genre: Science fiction

Publication
- Published in: Astounding Science Fiction Magazine
- Publication type: Magazine
- Publisher: Astounding Science Fiction Magazine
- Media type: Print (Periodical)
- Publication date: February 1943

"Mimsy Were the Borogoves" is a science fiction short story by Lewis Padgett (a pseudonym of American writers Henry Kuttner and C. L. Moore), originally published in the February 1943 issue of Astounding Science Fiction Magazine. It was judged by the Science Fiction Writers of America to be among the best science fiction stories written prior to 1965 and included in the anthology The Science Fiction Hall of Fame, Volume One, 1929–1964. In 2007, it was loosely adapted into a feature-length film titled The Last Mimzy. The title of the original short story quotes a verse from "Jabberwocky", a poem found in the novel Through the Looking-Glass by author Lewis Carroll.

== Plot summary ==
Millions of years in the future, a posthuman scientist is attempting to build a time machine and tests it by sending a box with a hastily gathered batch of educational toys into the ancient past. When the box fails to return, he constructs another and tests it the same way, but it also fails to return. Believing the entire experiment to be a failure, he discontinues his efforts and gives up on time machines. However, the first box arrives in the middle of the twentieth century and the second in the latter part of the nineteenth century, but both have had their time-travel circuitry irreparably damaged by the journey.

The first box of toys travels back to 1942 and is discovered by a seven-year-old boy named Scott Paradine, who takes it home. The toys include a small transparent cube that both follows and interacts with the holder's thoughts, a wire maze puzzle employing a fourth dimension, and a detailed anatomical doll that possesses modified versions of human organs, plus unknown additional structures. As Scott and his two-year-old sister, Emma, play with the toys, the brain activity of the two develops in unusual ways.

Although their parents are often preoccupied with their own lives, they notice unusual things going on with their children, such as strange conversations and nonsensical drawings, and the parents become worried. They consult with a child psychologist, Rex Holloway, who quickly recognizes the strangeness of the toys, and suspects them to be of extraterrestrial origin. Holloway surmises that the toys are "educating" the children and introducing an "X factor" into Scott's and Emma's thought processes, such as geometry that is unrelated to, and incompatible with, Euclidean geometry. He believes their developing young minds are pliable enough to be profoundly affected by the devices.

While still behaving mostly as normal children, the two occasionally show signs of developing unusual thought patterns, such as a conversation between Scott and his father about how salmon reproduce, in which Scott thinks it would be natural for a species to "send" its eggs upstream in a river, to hatch, and the young would choose to return to "the ocean" when they were sufficiently developed. Scott also wonders why humans still choose to live here, in the time and space of Earth, an idea that puzzles his father.

Holloway convinces the Paradine parents to take the toys away from the children, so that the children can return to normal development, and he attempts to study the toys himself, with little success. Meanwhile, the children continue thinking in the new patterns and communicating with each other in strange ways, including in their sleep and using strange words. Out of their parents' view, Scott begins collecting and creating small items for an abstract machine, largely at Emma's direction and guidance; she has more knowledge about how to construct the machine, but he has the skill to create it.

The second box arrives in 19th century England and is found by a child (implied to be Alice Liddell), who one day recites some verse learned from one of its contents to her "Uncle Charles" (Charles Dodgson, better known today as Lewis Carroll). Intrigued, he asks her its meaning; whereupon she, uncertain, identifies it as "the way out". Dodgson, in reply, promises to include it in his collection of writings about the stories she tells him, which are based on the toys from the box. He tells her that, unlike the other parts, which he has to modify so that adults can understand them, he will include this verse exactly as she told it to him.

Back in 1942, Scott and Emma have encountered Carroll's fantasy book Through the Looking-Glass, containing the poem "Jabberwocky". In its words, they identify the time-space equation that guided their production, organization, and operation of the abstract machine. (The title of Padgett's short story is a line from the poem.) One day, their father hears the children's cries of excitement from upstairs in their house and arrives in the doorway of Scott's bedroom just in time to see his young son and daughter vanish in a direction he cannot comprehend.

== Adaptations ==
- Tout spliques étaient les Borogoves (1970) directed for French TV by Daniel Lecomte.
- In 1976, Caedmon Records released a spoken word album of the short story (TC 1509), narrated by William Shatner.
- The Last Mimzy (2007) directed by Robert Shaye.
