= Lewis Padgett =

Science fiction pen-name of the 1940s and 1950s

Lewis Padgett was the joint pseudonym of the science fiction authors and spouses Henry Kuttner and C. L. Moore, taken from their mothers' maiden names. They also used the pseudonyms Lawrence O'Donnell and C. H. Liddell, as well as collaborating under their own names.

== Works ==
Writing as 'Lewis Padgett' they were the author of many humorous short stories of science fiction in the 1940s and 1950s. Among the most famous were:

- The "Gallegher" series of stories, collected in Robots Have No Tails (Gnome, 1952):
  - "The Proud Robot"
  - "Gallegher Plus"
  - "The World Is Mine"
  - "Ex Machina"
  - "Time Locker"
- "Mimsy Were the Borogoves"
- "The Twonky"
- "What You Need"

"Henry Kuttner: A Memorial Symposium" reproduced a letter from Henry Kuttner to the bibliographer Donald B. Day in which he stated: "Lawrence O’Donnell stories are usually by C. L. Moore. Exceptions: 'This is the House', by Kuttner. 'Fury,' May, June, July 1947, Astounding, collab.by Moore-Kuttner.

== Adaptations ==
- "The Twonky" was the inspiration for a radio show recording and a full-length film by the same name.
- Episodes of Tales of Tomorrow and The Twilight Zone were based on the short story "What You Need".
- In 1976, Caedmon Records released a spoken word album of the short story "Mimsy Were the Borogoves" (TC 1509), narrated by William Shatner.
- The feature film The Last Mimzy is loosely based on the short story "Mimsy Were the Borogoves".

== Bibliography ==
=== As themselves (1937–1956) ===
- Quest of the Starstone, 1937
- Earth's Last Citadel, 1943
- The Mask of Circe, 1948 (Illustrated by Alicia Austin in 1971)
- Home is the Hunter, 1953
- Or Else, 1953
- A Wild Surmise, 1953
- Home There's No Returning, 1955
- Two-Handed Engine, 1955
- No Boundaries, 1955 (collection)
- Rite of Passage, 1956

=== As Lewis Padgett (1941–1953) ===
- A Gnome There Was, 1941
- Piggy Bank, 1942
- Deadlock, 1942
- The Twonky, 1942
- Compliments of the Author, 1942
- Time Locker, 1943
- The Proud Robot, 1943
- Mimsy Were the Borogoves, 1943
- Shock, 1943
- Open Secret, 1943
- The World Is Mine, 1943
- Endowment Policy, 1943
- Gallegher Plus, 1943
- The Iron Standard, 1943
- When the Bough Breaks, 1944
- The Piper's Son, 1945
- Three Blind Mice, 1945
- Camouflage, 1945
- What You Need, 1945
- Line to Tomorrow, 1945
- Beggars in Velvet, 1945
- We Kill People, 1946
- Rain Check, 1946
- The Cure, 1946
- Time Enough, 1946
- The Fairy Chessmen, 1946 (2 parts)
- Chessboard Planet, 1946 (novel)
- Murder in Brass, 1946
- The Portal in the Picture, 1946 (novel), later published under the title Beyond Earth's Gates 1949
- Project, 1947
- Jesting Pilot, 1947
- Margin for Error, 1947
- Tomorrow and Tomorrow, 1947 (2 parts)
- Exit the Professor, 1947
- The Day He Died, 1947 (novel)
- Ex Machina, 1948
- Private Eye, 1949
- The Prisoner in the Skull, 1949
- See You Later, 1949
- Beyond Earth's Gates, 1949 (novel), originally published under the title The Portal in the Picture 1946
- Tomorrow and Tomorrow, 1951 (novel)
- Tomorrow and Tomorrow & The Fairy Chessmen, 1951 (omnibus)
- The Far Reality, 1951 (companion novel to Tomorrow and Tomorrow)
- Robots Have No Tails, 1952 (collection)
- Mutant, 1953
- Humpty Dumpty, 1953
- Epilogue, 1953 (essay)
- Line to Tomorrow and Other Stories of Fantasy and Science Fiction (collection)

=== As Lawrence O'Donnell (1943–1950) ===
- Clash By Night, 1943
- The Children's Hour, 1944
- The Code, 1945
- The Lion and the Unicorn, 1945
- This is the House, 1946
- Vintage Season, 1946
- Fury, 1947
- Promised Land, 1950
- Heir Apparent, 1950
- Paradise Street, 1950

=== As C. H. Liddell (1950–1953) ===
- The Sky is Falling, 1950
- Carry Me Home, 1950
- "P.S.'s Feature Flash", 1950 (essay)
- The Odyssey of Yiggar Throlg, 1951
- Android, 1951
- We Shall Come Back, 1951
- Golden Apple, 1951
- The Visitors, 1953

== External resources ==
- Lewis Padgett at the Internet Speculative Fiction Database
- Lewis Padgett at Library of Congress, with 8 library catalog records
- Henry Kuttner at LC Authorities, with 27 records
- C. L. Moore at LC Authorities, with 12 records
