= Kelvin Kent (pen name) =

Pseudonym and Pen Name Shared By Henry Kuttner and Arthur K. Barnes

"Kelvin Kent" was a pseudonym shared by writers Henry Kuttner and Arthur K. Barnes. The byline appeared on a series of 12 science fiction stories published in Thrilling Wonder Stories from 1939 to 1944, featuring protagonist "Pete Manx". Leigh Brackett noted that the stories were inspired by Edmond Hamilton's 1938 TWS story "Easy Money". Comics Journal essayist Donald Phelps described Manx as "a lumpen prole Broadwayite . . . A grubby, pragmatic Damon Runyonite [who] (sometimes reluctantly) embarked on time-traveling errands: these, at the behest of his scientist-buddy, inauspiciously named 'Dr. Mayhem'". Six stories in the series are ascribed to Kuttner, four to Barnes, and two are reportedly collaborations.

== Bibliography ==
Title	Author	Date
Roman Holiday	Kuttner & Barnes	August 1939
World's Pharaoh	Kuttner	December 1939
Science Is Golden	Kuttner & Barnes	April 1940
Knight Must Fall	Barnes	June 1940
The Comedy of Eras	Kuttner	September 1940
Man About Time	Kuttner	October 1940
The Greeks Had a War for It	Barnes	January 1941
Hercules Muscles In	Kuttner	February 1941
Dames Is Poison	Kuttner	June 1942
De Wolfe of Wall Street	Barnes	February 1943
Grief of Bagdad	Barnes	June 1943
Swing Your Lady	Kuttner	February 1944

== Omnibus ==
Haffner Press has announced an omnibus edition of the Kutter/Barnes collaborations and shared character stories, set for release in November 2015. Hollywood on the Moon / Man About Time: The Pete Manx Adventures will include all twelve Kelvin Kent stories, as well as six "Hollywood on the Moon" stories, which were originally published under Barnes's and/or Kuttner's names.
