= Jirel of Joiry =

Series of stories by C. L. Moore

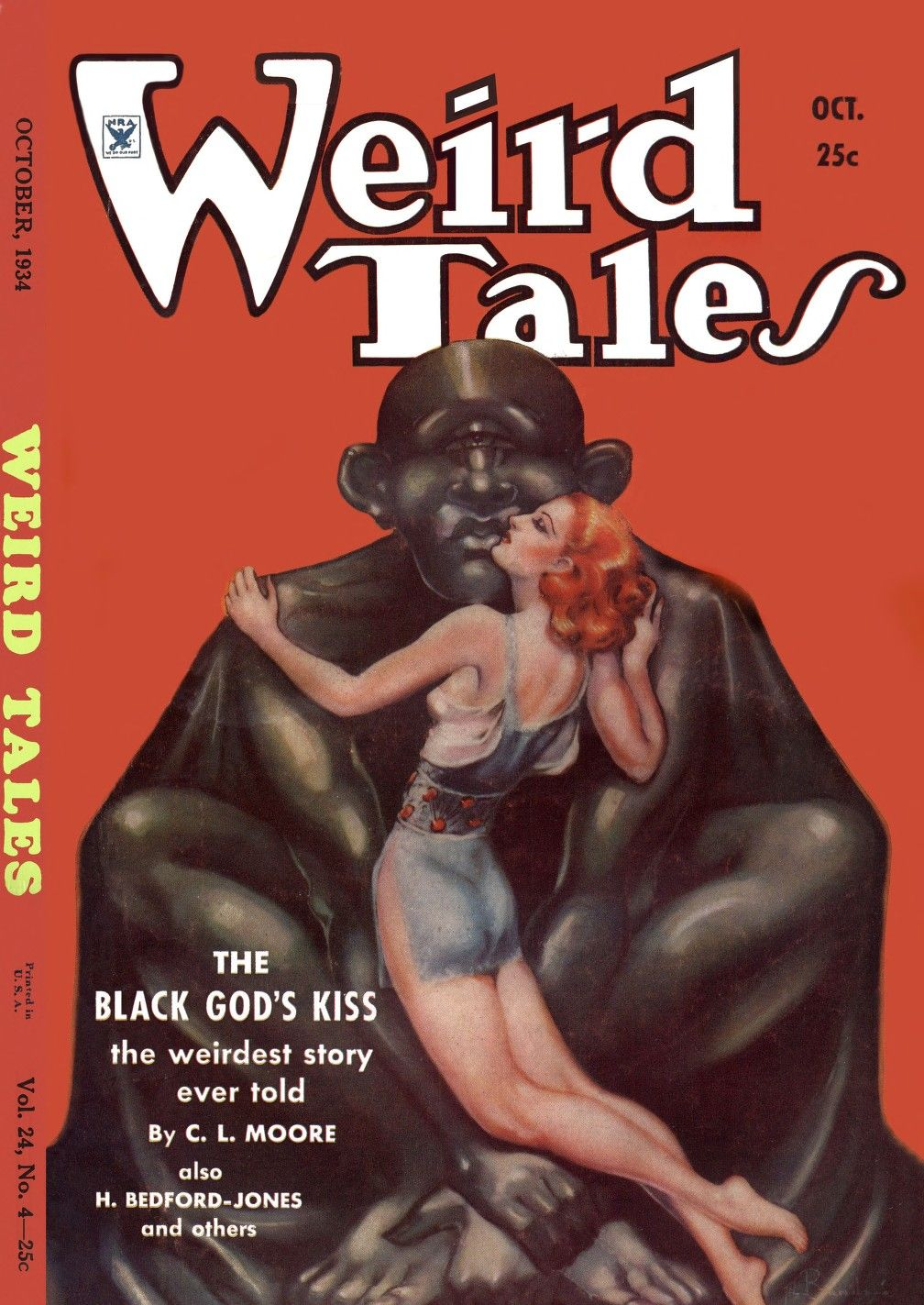
Cover of the October 1934 issue of Weird Tales, featuring the first Jirel of Joiry story "Black God's Kiss".

Jirel of Joiry is a fictional character created by American writer C. L. Moore, who appeared in a series of sword and sorcery stories published first in the pulp magazine Weird Tales.

== The character ==
Jirel is the proud, tough, arrogant and beautiful ruler of her own domain, Joiry; somewhere in late medieval France. "Quest of the Starstone", says that she lived circa 1500 CE. Her adventures continually involve her in dangerous brushes with the supernatural. In her afterword to the collection The Best of C. L. Moore, the author stated that Jirel and her earlier creation Shambleau, both represented idealized images of herself.

== Significance ==
These stories are among the first to show the influence of Robert E. Howard on sword and sorcery, and among the first sword and sorcery stories of any kind. They also introduced a female protagonist to the genre.

== Stories ==
- C. L. Moore, "The Black God's Kiss", Weird Tales, 24.4 (October 1934), pp. 402–21
- C. L. Moore, "Black God's Shadow", Weird Tales, 24.6 (December 1934), pp. 701–18
- C. L. Moore, "Jirel Meets Magic", Weird Tales, 26.1 (July 1935), pp. 30–53
- C. L. Moore, "The Dark Land", Weird Tales, 27.1 (January 1936), pp. 53–71
- C. L. Moore and Henry Kuttner, "Quest of the Starstone", Weird Tales, 30.5 (November 1937), pp. 556–75. (This story also featured Moore's other series character, the future space adventurer Northwest Smith.)
- C. L. Moore, "Hellsgarde", Weird Tales, 33.4 (April 1939), pp. 37–60.

== Continuation by other writers ==
In 2024, "Jirel and the Mirror of Truth" by Molly Tanzer, appeared in the third issue of New Edge Sword and Sorcery. This was written with the permission of Moore's estate.

Tanzer has also written an authorized novella, Blue Fire, which is due to be released by Brackenbury Books via crowdfunding platform BackerKit in early November 2026.

== Reception ==
She has been described as one of the first strong female characters in fantasy and "the world's first female sword-and-sorcery hero". Despite being a female character, her masculine traits have led to her being analyzed in the context of gender bending fiction.

== Bibliography ==
- Moore, C. L. (1969). Jirel of Joiry. Paperback Library.
  - Moore, C. L. (1996) [1969]. Jirel of Joiry. Ace Books. ISBN 0-441-38570-2.
- Moore, C. L. (2002). Black Gods and Scarlet Dreams. London: Orion/Gollancz. p. 439. ISBN 0-575-07417-5.. This collects all of the Jirel stories and the majority of stories featuring Northwest Smith.
- Moore, C. L. (2002). Black God's Kiss. Bellevue: Paizo/Planet Stories. p. 224. ISBN 978-1-60125-045-2..
