= Vintage Season =

1946 novella by Catherine L. Moore and (possibly) Henry Kuttner

- Author: C. L. Moore and Henry Kuttner (as "Lawrence O'Donnell")
- Language: English
- Genre: Science fiction
- Publisher: Astounding Science Fiction
- Publication date: September 1946
- Publication place: United States
- Media type: Print (Periodical, Anthologies)
- Text: Vintage Season online

Vintage Season is a science fiction novella by American authors Catherine L. Moore and Henry Kuttner, published under the joint pseudonym "Lawrence O'Donnell" in September, 1946. It has been anthologized many times and was selected for The Science Fiction Hall of Fame, Volume 2A.

== Authorship ==
This story is often said to be Moore's or "almost entirely" hers, but scholars are not certain of how much Kuttner was involved and at least one gives him some credit.

== Synopsis ==
The story is set in an unnamed American city at about the time of publication. There are several mentions of how beautiful the weather is.

Oliver Wilson is renting an old mansion to three vacationers for the month of May. He wants to get rid of them so he can sell the house to someone who has offered him three times its value, provided the buyer can move in during May. His fiancée, Sue, insists that he arrange for them to leave so that he can sell the house, giving them enough money for their impending marriage.

The tenants are a man, Omerie Sancisco, and two women, Klia and Kleph Sancisco. They fascinate Oliver with the perfection of their appearance and manners, their strange connoisseur's attitude to everything, and their secretiveness about their origin and about their insistence on staying at that house at that time. Oliver's half-hearted attempts to evict them flounder when he becomes attracted to Kleph. The mystery deepens with remarks she lets slip, with the unspectacular but advanced technology of things she has in her room—including a recorded "symphonia" that engages all the senses with imagery of historical disasters—and with the appearance of the would-be buyers, a couple from the same country, who plant a "subsonic" in the house intended to drive the residents out.

Hearing Kleph sing "Come hider, love, to me" from the Prologue to Chaucer's Canterbury Tales, Oliver realizes that she and her friends are time travelers from the future. He traps Kleph into admitting they are visiting the most perfect seasons in history, such as a fall in the late 14th century in Canterbury. Oliver happens to see a healed scar on her arm, which she hastens to cover and admits with obvious shame that it is an inoculation; the reason for her shame will become clear only at the end.

At the end of May, more time travelers visit the house. A meteorite lands nearby, destroying buildings and starting fires—the "spectacle" that the time travelers wanted to end their visit with. Oliver's house survives, as the visitors had already known it would.

The time travelers leave for the coronation of Charlemagne in 800, except Cenbe, the genius who composed the symphonia Oliver had experienced. In conversation with Oliver, Cenbe admits that the time travelers could prevent the disasters they savor but do not do so because changing history would keep their culture from coming to be. Oliver goes to his room, feeling ill.

In a short scene set in the future, the final version of Cenbe's symphonia is performed, including a powerful image of a face, apparently that of Oliver in the "emotional crisis" induced by his conversation with Cenbe.

Oliver writes down a warning about the time travelers, which he hopes will change history. However, he dies of a new plague, apparently brought to Earth by the meteor. The house and the unread message are destroyed in a futile effort at quarantine.

What would become known as "The Blue Death" enters history as a disaster comparable with the Black Death of the Middle Ages, both being part of Cenbe's symphonia (as well as the Great Plague of London). Eventually humanity manages to develop a cure and an inoculation against it, which would be given to time-travelers returning to this period—but that comes far too late for Oliver Wilson and countless others.

== Reception ==
Readers immediately acclaimed the story. It has been called "great", "perhaps the ultimate expression of Catherine L. Moore's art", "her masterpiece", "hauntingly memorable", "classic" and "one of the most brilliant stories in modern science fiction." One reviewer praised its "carefully controlled suspense".

== Derivative works ==
Robert Silverberg wrote a story about the aftermath, "In Another Country", which was published in Isaac Asimov's Science Fiction Magazine in 1989 and reprinted with Vintage Season as a Tor Double in 1990. (Silverberg had also taken up the theme of time-travel-as-tourism in his 1969 novel Up the Line.)

The 1992 American film Timescape, also titled Grand Tour: Disaster in Time, was loosely based on Vintage Season, though with a happy ending substituted for the somber conclusion of Moore's original.
