= Alicia Austin =

American artist (born 1942)

- Born: 1942 (age 83–84); Providence, Kentucky, United States
- Partner: Jinx Beers
- Awards: Hugo Award – Fan Artist; 1971; World Fantasy Award – Artist; 1979; Balrog Award – Professional Publication; 1979 Alicia Austin's Age of Dreams

Alicia Austin (born 1942) is an American fantasy and science fiction artist and illustrator. She works in print-making, Prismacolor, pastels and watercolors.

== Early life and education ==
Austin was born in Providence, Kentucky. As her father was career military, she grew up in Germany and Japan, as well as the United States. She studied art and biology on an art scholarship at the Sacred Heart Dominican College in Houston, Texas, which closed in 1975. Her early influences include Edmund Dulac, Arthur Rackham, and N.C. Wyeth.

== Career ==
In the beginning of her career, she illustrated for fanzines, such as Energumen, Granfalloon, Aspidistra, and Science Fiction Review. She sold every piece of work entered in the 1969 World Science Fiction Convention in St. Louis, and then began accepting professional assignments. Her first two assignments were the first two Universe anthologies, which were edited by Terry Carr. She then became a regular artist for Vertex magazine. Austin has illustrated books by Robert E. Howard, C. L. Moore, Andre Norton, Harold Lamb, Poul Anderson, Lewis Shiner, and Ursula K. Le Guin. A collection of her work, Alicia Austin's Age of Dreams, was published by Donald M. Grant, Publisher, Inc. in 1978.

== Personal life ==
She was partners with Jinx Beers, a lesbian activist, until her death in 2018. She lives in Los Angeles, California.

== Awards ==
- Hugo Award for Best Fan Artist (1971)
- World Fantasy Award - Artist (1979)
- Balrog Award - Best Professional Publication (1979)
- Inkpot Award (1991)
- Chesley Awards nomination (1989) (1993)

== Bibliography ==
- New Worlds of Fantasy#3 (1971)
- Universe 1 (1971)
- The Mask of Circe (1971)
- Universe 2 (1972)
- Echoes from an Iron Harp (1972)
- A Witch Shall be Born (1975)
- Black God's Shadow (1977)
- Alicia Austin's Age of Dreams (1978)
- The Demon of Scattery (1979)
- Destinies (1979)
- Destinies (1979)
- The Last Castle (1980)
- Voorloper (1980)
- The Illustrated Night Before Christmas (1980)
- Destinies (1980)
- Destinies (1980)
- Dragons of Light (1980)
- The Magic May Return (1981)
- Scarlet Dream (1981)
- The Forgotten Beasts of Eld (1981)
- Nirwana (1981)
- Durandal (1981)
- A Christmas Carol (1981)
- Asimov's Science Fiction (1981)
- Asimov's Science Fiction (1981)
- On St. Hubert's Thing (1982)
- The Adventure of Cobbler's Rune (1982)
- Amazing Stories (1982)
- The Sea of the Ravens (1983)
- Night's Master (1985)
- Marion Zimmer Bradley's Fantasy Magazine (1988–2000)
- Bridging the Galaxies (1993)
- Cat's Paw (2007)
