= Shambleau =

1933 short story by C. L. Moore

"Shambleau" is a short story by American science fiction and fantasy writer C. L. Moore. Though it was her first professional sale, it is her most famous story. It first appeared in the November 1933 issue of Weird Tales and has been reprinted numerous times. It features one of Moore's best-known heroes, Northwest Smith, a gun-toting spacefarer, and is a retelling of the Medusa myth; it looks at themes of sexuality and addiction.

Moore was inspired to write the story by the poem "The Haystack in the Floods" by William Morris, which describes a woman being pursued in medieval France.

== Plot ==
On Mars, tough smuggler Northwest Smith encounters a young woman being chased by a mob. Instinctively, he decides to protect her. The crowd identifies her as "Shambleau", but Smith does not recognize the name. He is surprised when the mob disperses without violence when he claims her as his own. To his puzzlement, he senses disgust, not hatred, aimed at him.

When Smith takes a closer look at the woman, he realizes that she is not human, though she is attractive. Feeling some responsibility for her, he allows her to shelter in his room, while he conducts his illegal business.

Smith eventually discovers firsthand that a Shambleau feeds on the life-force of others using the extensible, worm-like appendages it has instead of hair, while addicting its short-lived victims with pure ecstasy. Fortunately for Smith, his Venusian partner Yarol comes looking for him and finds him before it is too late. Unlike Smith, he knows what the creature is. Though he himself is drawn to the Shambleau, he manages to avert his gaze; then, using the Shambleau's reflection in a mirror, Yarol is able to shoot and kill it. Later, he speculates that the story of Perseus and Medusa had its origins in the activities of a Shambleau on ancient Earth.

== See also ==
- 1933 in science fiction
- Eel Girl (2008), a horror science fiction short film
- Harpya (1979), a Belgian short animated film
- "Jenifer" (Masters of Horror episode)
- Tomie, a Japanese horror manga series
