= Henry Kuttner =

American fiction author (1915–1958)

- Born: April 7, 1915; Los Angeles, California, United States
- Died: February 3, 1958 (aged 42); Los Angeles, California, United States
- Occupations: Short story writer; novelist
- Spouse: C. L. Moore (1940–1958)
- Writing career
- Genres: Science fiction, fantasy, horror

Henry Kuttner (April 7, 1915 – February 3, 1958) was an American author of science fiction, fantasy and horror.

== Early life ==
Henry Kuttner was born in Los Angeles, California in 1915. Naphtaly Kuttner (1829–1903) and Amelia Bush (c. 1834–1911), the parents of his father, bookseller Henry Kuttner (1863–1920), had come from Leszno in Prussia and lived in San Francisco since 1859; the parents of his mother, Annie Levy (1875–1954), were from Great Britain. Henry Kuttner's great-grandfather was scholar Josua Heschel Kuttner. Kuttner grew up in relative poverty following the death of his father. As a young man, he worked in his spare time for the literary agency of his uncle, Laurence D'Orsay (his first cousin by marriage), in Los Angeles before selling his first story, "The Graveyard Rats", to Weird Tales in early 1936. While working for the d'Orsay agency, Kuttner picked Leigh Brackett's early manuscripts off the slush pile; under his tutelage, she sold her first story (to John W. Campbell at Astounding Stories).

== Kuttner and Moore ==
Kuttner was known for his literary prose and worked in close collaboration with his wife, C. L. Moore. They met through their association with the "Lovecraft Circle", a group of writers and fans who corresponded with H. P. Lovecraft. Their work together spanned the 1940s and 1950s and most of the work was credited to pseudonyms, mainly Lewis Padgett and Lawrence O'Donnell.

L. Sprague de Camp, who knew Kuttner and Moore well, has stated that their collaboration was so seamless that, after a story was completed, it was often impossible for either Kuttner or Moore to recall who had written what. According to de Camp, it was typical for either partner to break off from a story in mid-paragraph or even mid-sentence, with the latest page of the manuscript still in the typewriter. The other spouse would routinely continue the story where the first had left off. They alternated in this manner as many times as necessary until the story was finished.

Among Kuttner's most popular work were the Gallegher stories, published under the Padgett name, about a man who invented high-tech solutions to client problems (assisted by his insufferably egomaniacal robot) when he was drunk, only to be completely unable to remember exactly what he had built or why after sobering up. These stories were later collected in Robots Have No Tails. In her introduction to the 1973 Lancer Books edition, Moore stated that Kuttner wrote all the Gallegher stories himself.

== Influence ==
Marion Zimmer Bradley is among many authors who have cited Kuttner as an influence. Her novel The Bloody Sun is dedicated to him. Roger Zelazny has talked about the influence of The Dark World on his Amber series.

Kuttner's friend Richard Matheson dedicated his 1954 novel I Am Legend to Kuttner, with thanks for his help and encouragement. Ray Bradbury has said that Kuttner actually wrote the last 300 words of Bradbury's first horror story, "The Candle" (Weird Tales, November 1942). Bradbury has referred to Kuttner as a neglected master and a "pomegranate writer: popping with seeds—full of ideas".

William S. Burroughs's novel The Ticket That Exploded contains direct quotes from Kuttner regarding the "Happy Cloak" parasitic pleasure monster from the Venusian seas.

Mary Elizabeth Counselman believed that Kuttner's habit of writing under widely varied pseudonyms deprived him of the fame that should have been his. "I have often wondered why Kuttner chose to hide his talents behind so many false faces for no editorial reason... Admittedly, the fun is in pretending to be someone else. But Kuttner cheated himself of much fame that he richly deserved by hiding his light under a bushel of pen names that many fans did not know were his. Seabury Quinn and I both chided him about this."

According to J. Vernon Shea, August Derleth "kept promising to publish Hank's and Catherine's books under the Arkham House imprint, but kept postponing them."

== The Cthulhu Mythos ==
A friend of Lovecraft's as well as of Clark Ashton Smith, Kuttner contributed several stories to the Cthulhu Mythos genre, based on the writing of the former and added to, among other authors, by the latter. Among these were "The Secret of Kralitz" (Weird Tales, October 1936), "The Eater of Souls" (Weird Tales, January 1937), "The Salem Horror" (Weird Tales, May 1937), "The Invaders" (Strange Stories, February 1939) and "The Hunt" (Strange Stories, June 1939).

Kuttner added a few lesser-known deities to the Mythos, including Iod ("The Secret of Kralitz"), Vorvadoss ("The Eater of Souls"), the Hydra and Nyogtha ("The Salem Horror"). Critic Shawn Ramsey suggests that Abigail Prinn, the villain of "The Salem Horror", might have been intended by Kuttner to be a descendant of Ludvig Prinn, author of De Vermis Mysteriis—a book that appears in Kuttner's "The Invaders".

Etchings and Odysseys No 4 (1984), edited by Eric A. Carlson, John J. Koblas and R. Alain Everts, was a special Kuttner tribute issue featuring three reprinted tales by Kuttner - "It Walks By Night", "The Frog" and "The Invaders," together with various essays on Kuttner, and an interview with his wife and fellow writer C.L. Moore.

Crypt of Cthulhu 5, No 7 (whole number 41) (Lammas 1986), edited by Robert M. Price, was a special Henry Kuttner issue collecting eight Cthulhu Mythos stories by Kuttner. (It did not include "Spawn of Dagon" or "The Invaders").

The Book of Iod: Ten Tales of the Mythos is a collection of Kuttner's Cthulhu Mythos stories edited by Robert M. Price (Chaosium, 1995). (It also contains three additional tales concerning 'Iod's dread tome' by Robert Bloch, Lin Carter and Robert M. Price). The Kuttner stories included are: "The Secret of Kralitz", "The Eater of Souls", "The Salem Horror", "The Jest of Droom-Avesta", "Spawn of Dagon", "The Invaders", "The Frog", "Hydra", "Bells of Horror" and "The Hunt" - thus, all the Mythos stories which had appeared in the special Kuttner issue of Crypt of Cthulhu, plus "Spawn of Dagon" and "The Invaders". The story "The Black Kiss" (printed here, as often elsewhere, under the joint byline of Kuttner and Robert Bloch), was in fact written entirely by Bloch; Bloch co-credited Kuttner on the tale due to using the character Michael Leigh from "The Salem Horror". "Beneath the Tombstone" by Robert M. Price and "Dead of Night" by Lin Carter round out the volume. Price points out in his introduction to the volume that "Henry Kuttner's own private corner of the Cthulhu Mythos was, then, apparently derived in about equal measure from Lovecraft, Bloch, Zoroastrianism, and Theosophy."

== Later life ==
Kuttner spent the mid-1950s getting his master's degree but died of a heart attack in Los Angeles in 1958.

== Known pseudonyms ==
- Edward J. Bellin
- Paul Edmonds
- Noel Gardner
- Will Garth
- James Hall
- Keith Hammond
- Hudson Hastings
- Peter Horn
- Kelvin Kent (used for work with Arthur K. Barnes)
- Robert O. Kenyon
- C. H. Liddell
- Hugh Maepenn
- Scott Morgan
- Lawrence O'Donnell
- Lewis Padgett
- Woodrow Wilson Smith
- Charles Stoddard (house pseudonym used by others as well)

== Partial bibliography ==
=== Short stories ===
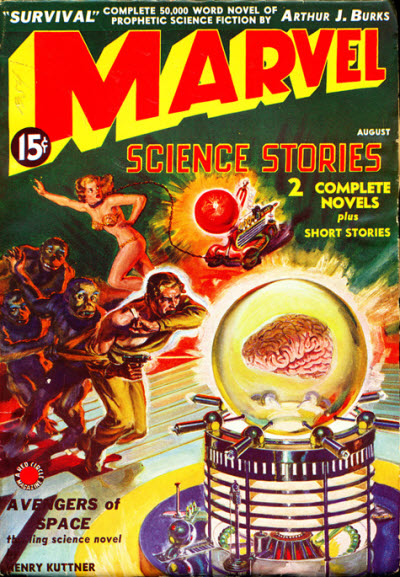
Kuttner's novelette "Avengers of Space" took the cover for the debut issue of Marvel Science Stories in 1938

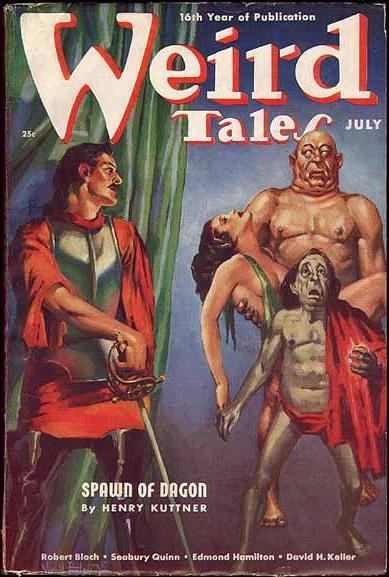
Kuttner's novelette "Spawn of Dagon", part of his Elak of Atlantis series, was the cover story for the July 1938 Weird Tales

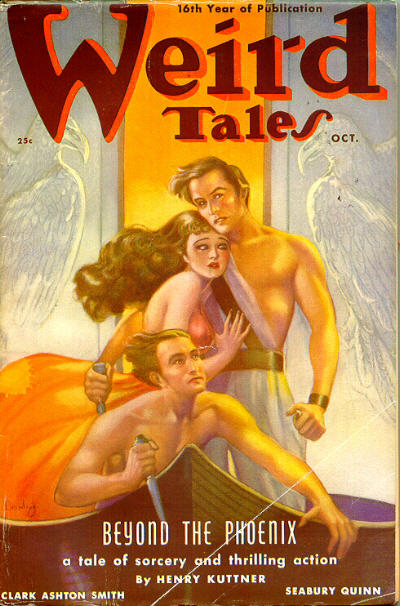
Another Elak story, "Beyond the Phoenix," was cover-featured in the October 1938 Weird Tales

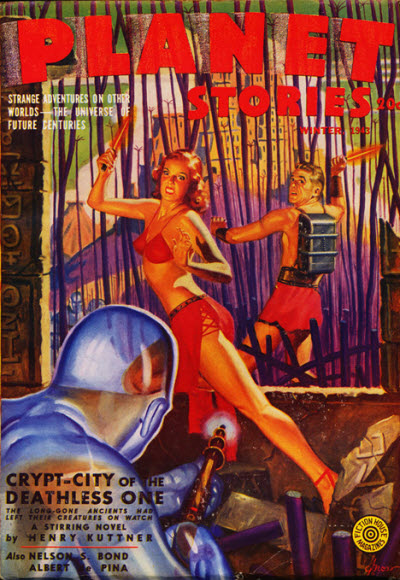
Kuttner's novella "Crypt-City of the Deathless One" was the cover story for the Winter 1943 issue of Planet Stories

==== Tony Quade stories ====
- "I. Hollywood on the Moon" (1938)
- "II. Doom World" (1938)
- "III. The Star Parade" (1938)
- "IV. Trouble on Titan" (1941)

==== Elak of Atlantis stories ====
- "Thunder in the Dawn" (1938)
- "Spawn of Dagon" (1938)
- "Beyond the Phoenix" (1939)
- "Dragon Moon" (1941)

==== Thunder Jim Wade series (as by Charles Stoddard) ====
- "Thunder Jim Wade" (1941)
- "The Hills of Gold" (1941)
- "The Poison People" (1941)
- "The Devil's Glacier" (1941)
- "Waters of Death" (1941)

==== "Baldy" Stories ====
- "The Piper's Son" (1945)
- "Three Blind Mice" (1945)
- "The Lion And The Unicorn" (1945)
- "Beggars in Velvet" (1945)
- "Humpty Dumpty" (1953)
- "Mutant" (1953)

==== Cthulhu Mythos stories ====
- "The Secret of Kralitz" (1936)
- "The Eater of Souls" (1937)
- "The Salem Horror" (1937)
- "The Invaders" (1939)
- "Bells of Horror" (1939)
- "The Hunt" (1939)
- "The Jest of Droom-Avesta"
- "Spawn of Dagon"
- "The Frog"
- "Hydra"

==== Gallegher stories ====
- "The Proud Robot" (as Lewis Padgett, 1943)
- "The Time Locker" (as Lewis Padgett, 1943)
- "Gallegher Plus" (as Lewis Padgett, 1943)
- "The World Is Mine" (as Lewis Padgett, 1943)
- "Ex Machina" (as Lewis Padgett, 1948)

==== Hogben stories ====
- "The Old Army Game" (1941)
- "Exit the Professor" (as Kuttner and as Lewis Padgett, 1947)
- "Pile of Trouble" (1948)
- "See You Later" (as Kuttner and as Lewis Padgett, 1949)
- "Cold War" (as Kuttner and as Lewis Padgett, 1949)

==== Other ====
- "The Graveyard Rats" (1936), adapted for Trilogy of Terror II (1996) and Guillermo del Toro's Cabinet of Curiosities (2022)
- "Dictator of the Americas" (as James Hall, 1938)
- "Avengers of Space" (1938)
- "Beauty and the Beast" (1940)
- "Dr. Cyclops" (1940)
- "Masquerade" (1942), adapted for episode of television series Thriller (1961)
- "Mimsy Were the Borogoves" (as Lewis Padgett, 1943) used as the basis for the 2007 film The Last Mimzy, and for the French TV adaptation "Tout spliques étaient les Borogoves" (1970)
- "Clash by Night" (with C. L. Moore) (1943)
- "Nothing but Gingerbread Left" (1943)
- "The Twonky" (as Lewis Padgett, 1942), adapted for film of the same name in 1953
- "The Eyes of Thar" (published in Planet Stories, Fall Issue, 1944)
- "What You Need" (as Lewis Padgett, 1945) adapted for "What You Need" episodes of Tales of Tomorrow (1952) and The Twilight Zone (1959) television shows
- "The Cure" (1946)
- "The Dark Angel" (with C. L. Moore, 1946), later published as "Dark Angel" (as Lewis Padgett, 1975), adapted for episode of same name of television series Tales of Tomorrow
- "Call Him Demon" (1946)
- "Vintage Season" (with C. L. Moore; 1946), filmed in 1992 as Timescape
- "Land of the Earthquake" (1947)
- "Happy Ending" (1949)
- "Satan Sends Flowers" (1953)
- "Or Else" (1953)
- The Best of Henry Kuttner anthologizes 17 stories. (Garden City, NY: Doubleday, 1975).
- The Eyes of Thar (1944)
- Atomic! (1947)

=== Fixups ===
- Mutant (the Baldie stories) (1953)
- Robots Have No Tails (the Gallegher stories, as Lewis Padgett) (1952)
- Hollywood on the Moon (the Tony Quade stories) (2019)

=== Novels ===
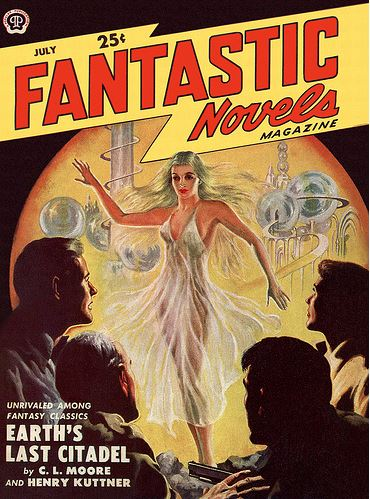
Earth's Last Citadel was reprinted in the July 1950 edition of Fantastic Novels.

- A Million Years to Conquer (1940), published in book form as The Creature from Beyond Infinity (1968)
- Earth's Last Citadel (with C. L. Moore) (1943, first book publication 1964)
- The Fairy Chessmen (1946, as Lewis Padgett, also retitled as Chessboard Planet and The Far Reality)
- Valley of the Flame (1946, first book publication 1964)
- The Dark World (with C. L. Moore (assumed)) (1946, first book publication 1965)
- The Brass Ring (with C. L. Moore) (1946, nongenre, also published as Murder in Brass)
- Tomorrow and Tomorrow (1947, as Lewis Padgett)
- Fury (as Lawrence O'Donnell with C. L. Moore) (1947, first book publication 1950, later published under the title Destination: Infinity in 1958)
- The Day He Died (with C. L. Moore) (1947, nongenre)
- The Mask of Circe (1948, first book publication 1971) (Illustrated by Alicia Austin in 1971)
- The Time Axis (1949, first book publication 1965)
- The Portal in the Picture (with C. L. Moore) (1949, also known as Beyond Earth's Gates)
- The Well of the Worlds (1952, first book publication 1953)
- Man Drowning (1952, mystery novel)
- The Murder of Eleanor Pope (1956, mystery novel)
- The Murder of Ann Avery (1956, mystery novel)
- Murder of a Mistress (1957, mystery novel)
- Murder of a Wife (1958, mystery novel)

=== Collections ===
- Ahead of Time
- The Best of Henry Kuttner
- The Best of Kuttner 1
- The Best of Kuttner 2
- The Book of Iod
- Bypass to Otherness
- Chessboard Planet and Other Stories (with C. L. Moore)
- Clash by Night and Other Stories (with C. L. Moore)
- Detour to Otherness (with C. L. Moore)
- Elak of Atlantis
- A Gnome There Was
- Hollywood on the Moon / Man About Time: The Pete Manx Adventures (with Arthur K. Barnes) (announced for 2011)
- Kuttner Times Three
- Line to Tomorrow and Other Stories of Fantasy and Science Fiction (with C. L. Moore)
- The Michael Gray Murders (with C. L. Moore) (announced for 2012)
- No Boundaries (with C. L. Moore)
- Prince Raynor
- Return to Otherness
- Secret of the Earth Star and Others
- The Startling Worlds of Henry Kuttner
- Terror in the House: The Early Kuttner, Volume One
- Thunder in the Void
- Thunder Jim Wade
- Two-Handed Engine: The Selected Short Fiction of Henry Kuttner & C. L. Moore
- The Hogben Chronicles—Kickstarter Project posthumously pushed by Neil Gaiman, F. Paul Wilson, Pierce Waters, Thomas L. Monteleone, and with special assist by Alan Moore.

=== Television ===
- "The Martian Eyes" episode(s) of Lights Out series (1950 and/or 1951)
- "Price on His Head" episode of series Sugarfoot (1958)
- Tales of Frankenstein (pilot for television series that was not picked up, 1958)
- "The Eye" episode of Out of the Unknown television series (1966)

=== Comic books ===
- "Doiby Dickles Enters High Sassiety"; Green Lantern comic story; 13 pages; Green Lantern #12; Summer 1944
- "The Gambler"; Green Lantern comic story; 13 pages; Green Lantern #12; Summer 1944
- "The Lord Haw-Haw of Crime"; Green Lantern comic story; 13 pages; Green Lantern #13; Fall 1944
- "Doiby Dickles, Da District Attorney"; Green Lantern comic story; 13 pages; All-American Comics #62; December 1944
- "A Tale of a City"; Green Lantern comic story; 12 pages; Comic Cavalcade #9; Winter 1944
- "The Cave Kid Goes To Town"; Green Lantern comic story; 13 pages; Green Lantern #14; Winter 1944–45
- "The Jewel of Hope"; Green Lantern comic story; 13 pages; Green Lantern #16; Summer 1945
- "Doiby Dickles, the Human Bomb"; Green Lantern comic story; 12 pages; All-American Comics #71; March 1946
- "The Last of the Buccaneers"; Green Lantern comic story; 12 pages; Green Lantern #18; Winter 1945–1946
- "The Man Who Doubled In Death, or, The Duplicity of Johnny Double"; Green Lantern comic story; 13 pages; Green Lantern #18; Winter 1945–1946
- "Sing a Song of Disaster"; Green Lantern comic story; 12 pages; Green Lantern #19; April–May 1946
- "Dickles Vs. Fate"; Green Lantern comic story; 13 pages; Green Lantern #19; April–May 1946
- "Jonah Was a Jinx"; Green Lantern comic story; 13 pages; Green Lantern #19; April–May 1946
- "The Gambler Comes Back"; Green Lantern comic story; 13 pages; Green Lantern #20; June–July 1946
- "The Good Humor Man"; Green Lantern comic story; 13 pages; Green Lantern #21; August–September 1946
- "What Makes Goitrude Go?"; Green Lantern / comic story / 13 pages; Green Lantern (1941 series) #21; August–September 1946
- "The Man Who Insults Everybody"; Green Lantern comic story; 13 pages; Green Lantern #22; October–November 1946
- "The Invisible World" Green Lantern comic story; 13 pages; Green Lantern #22; October–November 1946
