= C. L. Moore =

American science fiction and fantasy writer (1911–1987)

- Moore
- Born: Catherine Lucille Moore; January 24, 1911; Indianapolis, Indiana, US
- Died: April 4, 1987 (aged 76); Hollywood, California, US
- Occupation: Writer
- Spouses: Henry Kuttner (1940–1958, his death); Thomas Reggie (1963–1987, her death)
- Writing career
- Pen name: Lawrence O'Donnell; C. H. Liddell; Lewis Padgett
- Period: 1933–1963
- Genres: Science fiction, fantasy

Catherine Lucille Moore (January 24, 1911 – April 4, 1987) was an American science fiction and fantasy writer, who first came to prominence in the 1930s writing as C. L. Moore. She was among the first women to write in the science fiction and fantasy genres (though earlier woman writers in these genres include Clare Winger Harris, Greye La Spina, and Francis Stevens, among others). Moore's work paved the way for many other female speculative fiction writers.

Moore married her first husband Henry Kuttner in 1940, and most of her work from 1940 to 1958 (Kuttner's death) was written by the couple collaboratively. They were prolific co-authors under their own names, although more often under any one of several pseudonyms.

As "Catherine Kuttner", she had a brief career as a television scriptwriter from 1958 to 1962. She retired from writing in 1963.

== Early life ==
Moore was born on January 24, 1911, in Indianapolis, Indiana, to Maude Estelle Moore, whose father Levi N. Jones had been a Methodist minister, and Otto Newman Moore. Otto "operated a large shop designing and manufacturing tools and machinery"; his own father was the doctor Henry Moore. C. L. Moore was chronically ill as a child and spent much of her time reading literature of the fantastic. The young Moore's favourite reading material included Alice in Wonderland, the Oz books, and the novels of Edgar Rice Burroughs. She also read the pulp magazines Adventure, Amazing Stories and Weird Tales. In 1929, she began a degree in English at Indiana University's Bloomington campus, but the financial pressures on her family caused by the Great Depression meant that after three semesters she had to switch to a business college to learn to be a secretary. She gained work as a secretary at the Fletcher Trust Company in Indianapolis.

By 1936, Moore was engaged to one Herbert Ernest Lewis, who also worked at Fletcher Trust. However, he died by a gunshot wound on 13 February 1936. Moore herself, and the newspapers, reported the death as accidental, but according to the pulp fiction scholar Bobby Derie, "the death certificate lists it as a suicide".

== Early career ==
Moore's first publication appears to have been a poem called "Song of the Spirit of St. Louis", published in The Indianapolis Star on 7 October 1928 and credited to Catherine L. Moore. In 1930–31, The Vagabond, a student-run magazine at Indiana University, published three of her stories as Catherine Moore, all in the vein of fantasy: "Happily Ever After", "Semira", and "Two Fantasies". Her first professional sales appeared in pulp magazines beginning in 1933. Her decision to publish under the name "C. L. Moore" stemmed not from a desire to hide her gender, but to keep her employers at Fletcher Trust from knowing that she was working as a writer on the side.

Her early work included two significant series in Weird Tales, then edited by Farnsworth Wright. One features the rogue and adventurer Northwest Smith wandering through the Solar System; the other features the swordswoman/warrior Jirel of Joiry, one of the first female protagonists in sword-and-sorcery fiction. Both series are sometimes named for their lead characters. One of the Northwest Smith stories, "Nymph of Darkness", published in 1936, was written in collaboration with Forrest J Ackerman.

The most famous Northwest Smith story is "Shambleau", which was also Moore's first professional sale. It originally appeared in the November 1933 issue of Weird Tales, netting her $100, and later becoming a popular anthology reprint.

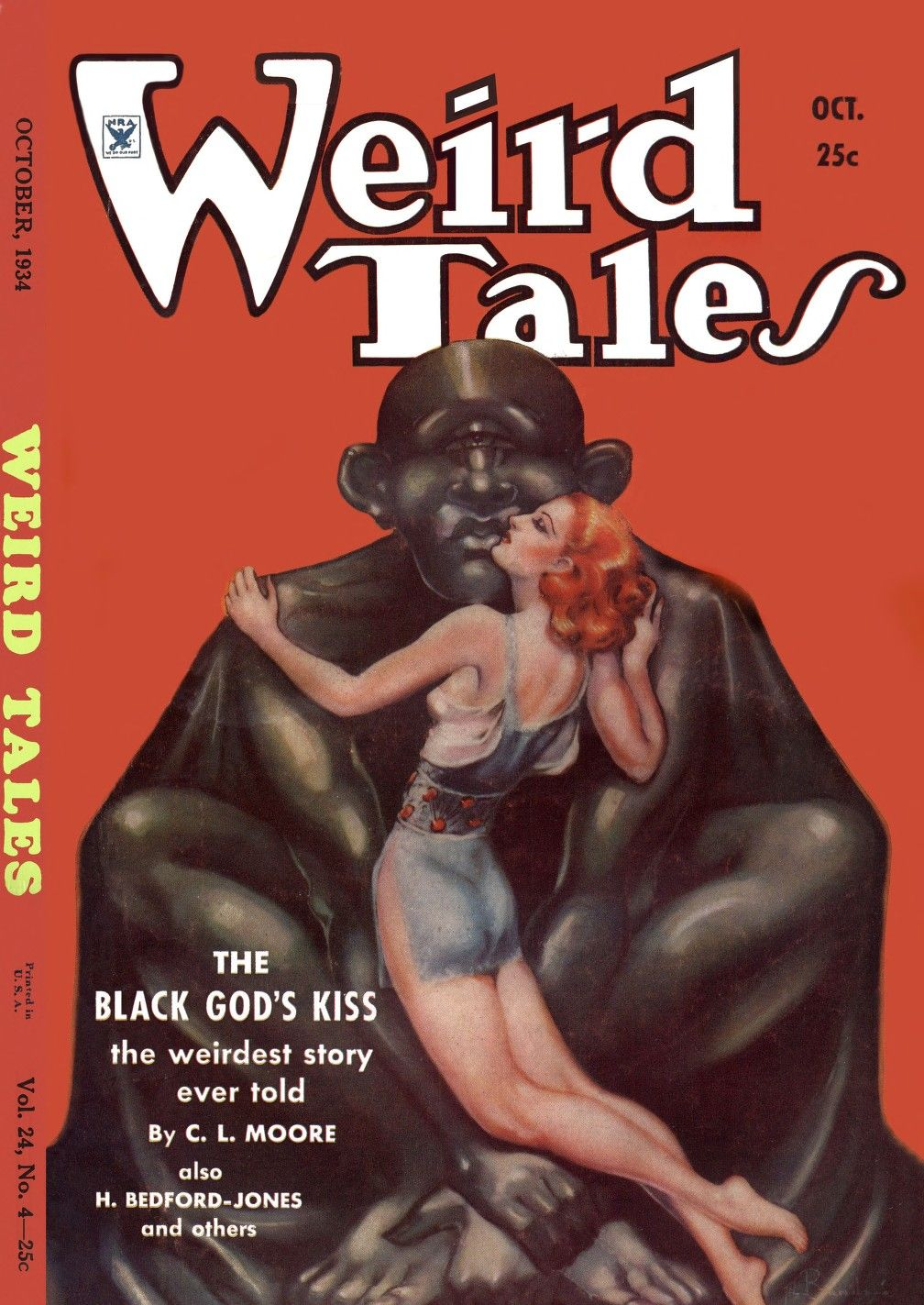
Cover of Weird Tales, October 1934, featuring "The Black God's Kiss" by Moore (painting by Margaret Brundage)

Her most famous Jirel story is also the first one, "Black God's Kiss", which was the cover story in the October 1934 issue of Weird Tales, subtitled "the weirdest story ever told" (see figure). Moore's early stories were notable for their emphasis on the senses and emotions, which was unusual in genre fiction at the time. Having encountered Moore's work in Weird Tales, H. P. Lovecraft corresponded with her from March 1935 until February 1937, shortly before his death. Unusually, it was Lovecraft who, impressed with Moore's work, initiated the correspondence.

Moore's work also appeared in Astounding Science Fiction magazine throughout the 1940s. Several stories written for that magazine were later collected in her first published book, Judgment Night (1952) (Note: In 1951 Gnome had published Tomorrow and Tomorrow and the Fairy Chessmen, the omnibus edition of two short novels by Moore & Kuttner as Lewis Padgett, which had been two-part serials in Astounding during 1947 and 1946. Judgment Night comprised five stories by Moore alone—none from the Northwest Smith and Jirel series, which Gnome collected in part one year later.) One of them, the novella "No Woman Born" (1944), was to be included in more than 10 different science fiction anthologies including The Best of C. L. Moore.

Included in that collection were "Judgment Night" (first published in August and September 1943), the lush rendering of a future galactic empire with a sober meditation on the nature of power and its inevitable loss; "The Code" (July 1945), an homage to the classic Faust with modern theories and Lovecraftian dread; "Promised Land" (February 1950) and "Heir Apparent" (July 1950), both documenting the grim twisting that mankind must undergo in order to spread into the Solar System; and "Paradise Street" (September 1950), a futuristic take on the Old West conflict between lone hunter and wilderness-taming settlers.

== Marriage to Henry Kuttner and literary collaborations ==
Moore met Henry Kuttner, also a science fiction writer, in 1936 when he wrote her a fan letter under the impression that "C. L. Moore" was a man. They soon collaborated on a story that combined Moore's signature characters, Northwest Smith and Jirel of Joiry: "Quest of the Starstone" (1937).

Moore and Kuttner married in 1940 and thereafter wrote many of their stories in collaboration, sometimes under their own names, but more often using the joint pseudonyms C. H. Liddell, Lawrence O'Donnell, or Lewis Padgett — most commonly the latter, a combination of their mothers' maiden names. Moore still occasionally wrote solo work during this period, including the frequently anthologized "No Woman Born" (1944). A selection of Moore's solo short fiction work from 1942 through 1950 was collected in 1952's Judgement Night. Moore's only solo novel, Doomsday Morning, appeared in 1957.

The vast majority of Moore's work in the period, though, was written as part of a very prolific partnership. Working together, the couple managed to combine Moore's style with Kuttner's more cerebral storytelling. They continued to work in science fiction and fantasy, and their works include two frequently anthologized sci-fi classics: "Mimsy Were the Borogoves" (February 1943), the basis for the film The Last Mimzy (2007), and Vintage Season (September 1946), the basis for the film Timescape (1992). As "Lewis Padgett" they also penned two mystery novels: The Brass Ring (1946) and The Day He Died (1947).

== Later career ==
From 1950 to 1956, Moore took a BA in English at the University of Southern California, completing a master's degree there in 1964. After Kuttner's death in 1958, Moore continued teaching his writing course at the University of Southern California until 1961, but permanently retired from writing any further literary fiction. Instead, working as "Catherine Kuttner", she carved out a short-lived career as a scriptwriter for Warner Bros. television, writing episodes of the westerns Sugarfoot, Maverick, and The Alaskans, as well as the detective series 77 Sunset Strip, all between 1958 and 1962. However, upon marrying Thomas Reggie (who was not a writer) in 1963, she ceased writing fiction entirely.

Moore was the author guest of honor at Kansas City, Missouri's fantasy and science fiction convention BYOB-Con 6, held over the U.S. Memorial Day weekend in May 1976. She was a pro guest of honor at Denvention II (the 39th World Science Fiction Convention) in 1981.

In a 1979 interview, she said that she and a writer friend were collaborating on a fantasy story, and how it could possibly form the basis of a new series. But nothing was ever published.

In 1981, Moore received two annual awards for her career in fantasy literature: the World Fantasy Award for Life Achievement, chosen by a panel of judges at the World Fantasy Convention, and the Gandalf Grand Master Award, chosen by vote of participants in the World Science Fiction Convention. (Thus she became the eighth and final Grand Master of Fantasy, sponsored by the Swordsmen and Sorcerers' Guild of America, in partial analogy to the Grand Master of Science Fiction sponsored by the Science Fiction Writers of America.)

Moore was an active member of the Tom and Terri Pinckard Science Fiction literary salon and a frequent contributor to literary discussions with the regular membership, including Robert Bloch, George Clayton Johnson, Larry Niven, Jerry Pournelle, Norman Spinrad, A. E. van Vogt, and others, as well as many visiting writers and speakers.

== Later life ==
Moore developed Alzheimer's disease, but that was not obvious for several years. She had ceased to attend the meetings when she was nominated to be the first woman Grand Master of the Science Fiction Writers of America; the nomination was withdrawn at the request of her husband, Thomas Reggie, who said the award and ceremony would be at best confusing and likely upsetting to her, given the progress of her disease. She died on April 4, 1987, at her home in Hollywood, California.

== Influence ==
Moore's work was cited as an influence by several later female writers of science fiction and fantasy, including Leigh Brackett, Marion Zimmer Bradley, Suzy McKee Charnas, C. J. Cherryh and Molly Tanzer. Moore's fiction was also an inspiration to male writers such as Jack Vance, Gene Wolfe, and Michael Moorcock.

== Awards ==
- 1978: Fritz Leiber Award
- 1981: Gandalf Grand Master Award, World Fantasy Convention Lifetime Achievement Award
- 1998: Posthumous induction into the Science Fiction and Fantasy Hall of Fame
- 2004: Cordwainer Smith Rediscovery Award
- 2019: Retro Hugo Award for best Novelette for the year 1944

== Selected works ==
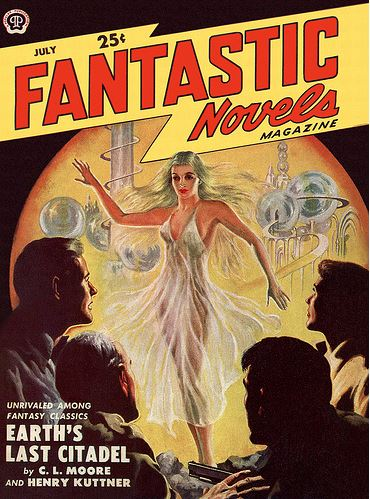
Earth's Last Citadel was reprinted in the July 1950 edition of Fantastic Novels.

- Scarlet Dream (short story, 1934)
- "There Shall be Darkness" (short story, 1942)
- Earth's Last Citadel (with Henry Kuttner; 1943)
- The Dark World (credited to Henry Kuttner, but believed by many critics to be a collaboration, 1946)
- Vintage Season (novella written with Henry Kuttner, as "Lawrence O'Donnell"; 1946). It was filmed in 1992 as Timescape.
- The Mask of Circe (with Henry Kuttner; 1948, Illustrated by Alicia Austin; 1971)
- Beyond Earth's Gates (1949)
- Judgment Night (stories, 1952)
- Shambleau and Others (stories, 1953)
- Northwest of Earth (stories, 1954)
- No Boundaries (with Henry Kuttner; stories, 1955)
- Doomsday Morning (1957)
- Jirel of Joiry (Paperback Library, 1969); Black God's Shadow (Donald M. Grant, 1977)—the five Jirel stories collected; the latter a limited edition with color plates, signed, numbered, and boxed
- The Best of C. L. Moore, edited by Lester Del Rey (Nelson Doubleday, 1975)—includes a biographical introduction by Lester Del Rey, which is carefully noncommittal about the influence of her personal life on her writing, and an autobiographical afterword by Moore
- Black God's Kiss (Paizo Publishing, 2007; ISBN 978-1-60125-045-2)—the five Jirel stories collected
- Northwest of Earth: The Complete Northwest Smith (Paizo Publishing, 2008; ISBN 978-1-60125-081-0)—the thirteen Northwest Smith stories collected
