= Travelers of Space =

1951 anthology of science fiction short stories edited by Martin Greenberg

- Dust-cover for the first edition
- Editor: Martin Greenberg
- Illustrator: Edd Cartier
- Cover artist: Edd Cartier
- Language: English
- Genre: Science fiction
- Publisher: Gnome Press
- Publication date: 1951
- Publication place: United States
- Media type: Print (hardback)
- Pages: 400

Travelers of Space is a 1951 anthology of science fiction short stories edited by Martin Greenberg. The stories were published originally in the magazines Planet Stories, Astounding SF, Thrilling Wonder Stories and Startling Stories.

== Contents ==
- Foreword, by Martin Greenberg
- Introduction, by Willy Ley
- "The Rocketeers Have Shaggy Ears", by Keith Bennett
- "Christmas Tree", by Christopher S. Youd
- "The Forgiveness of Tenchu Taen", by Frederic Arnold Kummer
- "Episode On Dhee Minor", by Harry Walton
- "The Shape of Things", by Ray Bradbury
- "Columbus Was a Dope", by Lyle Monroe (pseudonym for Robert A. Heinlein)
- "Attitude", by Hal Clement
- "The Ionian Cycle", by William Tenn
- "Trouble On Tantalus", by P. Schuyler Miller
- "Placet Is a Crazy Place", by Fredric Brown
- "Action on Azura", by Robertson Osborne
- "The Rull", by A. E. van Vogt
- "The Double Dyed Villains", by Poul Anderson
- "Bureau of Slick Tricks", by H. B. Fyfe
- "Life On Other Worlds", by Edd Cartier
- "The Interstellar Zoo", by David A. Kyle
- Science Fiction Dictionary

== Reception ==
P. Schuyler Miller noted that Greenberg had limited his selections to "largely if not entirely unanthologized stories", limiting the contents to less familiar stories concerning the main theme.

== Sources ==
- Chalker, Jack L.; Mark Owings (1998). The Science-Fantasy Publishers: A Bibliographic History, 1923-1998. Westminster, MD and Baltimore: Mirage Press, Ltd. pp. 299–300.
- Contento, William G. "Index to Science Fiction Anthologies and Collections".
- Travelers of Space title listing at the Internet Speculative Fiction Database
