= Men Against the Stars =

Short fiction anthology by Martin Greenberg

- Dust-jacket from the first edition
- Editor: Martin Greenberg
- Cover artist: Edd Cartier
- Language: English
- Genre: Science fiction Short stories
- Publisher: Gnome Press
- Publication date: 1950
- Publication place: United States
- Media type: Print (hardback)
- Pages: 351

Men Against the Stars is a 1950 anthology of science fiction short stories edited by Martin Greenberg, originally published in hardcover by Gnome Press. A British hardcover was issued by Grayson & Grayson in 1951. Pyramid Books published several abridged paperback versions in the late 1950s and early 1960s.

It was the first “theme” anthology in science fiction, where all stories are about a common idea, setting, or concept. All the stories, save one, had originally appeared in the magazine Astounding SF. The other story, "When Shadows Fall", first appeared in Startling Stories.

== Contents ==
- Foreword, by Martin Greenberg
- Introduction, by Willy Ley
- "Trends", by Isaac Asimov
- "Men Against the Stars", by Manly Wade Wellman
- "The Red Death of Mars", by Robert Moore Williams
- "Locked Out", by H. B. Fyfe
- "The Iron Standard", by Lewis Padgett
- "Schedule", by Harry Walton
- "Far Centaurus", by A. E. van Vogt
- "Cold Front", by Hal Clement
- "The Plants", by Murray Leinster
- "Competition", by E. Mayne Hull
- "Bridle and Saddle", by Isaac Asimov
- "When Shadows Fall", by L. Ron Hubbard

== Reception ==
Fletcher Pratt, writing in The New York Times, reported that editor Greenberg "has done an extremely good job of choosing his entries". Anthony Boucher praised the volume as "a pioneer among 'patterned' anthologies [and] an outstanding collection." P. Schuyler Miller called it "one of the best science fiction anthologies to date” [in 1950], praising the consistent selection of "stories of human problems and human values."

== Sources ==
- Chalker, Jack L.; Mark Owings (1998). The Science-Fantasy Publishers: A Bibliographic History, 1923-1998. Westminster, MD and Baltimore: Mirage Press, Ltd. p. 298.
- Contento, William G. "Index to Science Fiction Anthologies and Collections".
