= First Fandom Hall of Fame award =

Science fiction award

First Fandom Hall of Fame
- Awarded for: Contributions to the field of science fiction
- Presented by: First Fandom
- First award: 1963

First Fandom Hall of Fame is an annual award for contributions to the field of science fiction. Contributions can be as a fan, writer, editor, artist, agent, or any combination of the five. It is awarded by First Fandom and is usually presented at the beginning of the World Science Fiction Convention's Hugo Award ceremony.

In 1994, the Posthumous Hall of Fame Award was established for those who "should have but did not receive deserved recognition during their lifetime". In 1998, the Sam Moskowitz Archive Award was established. This award is for “excellence in collecting”.

== List of winners ==
=== 1960s ===
1963

- E. E. Smith

1964

- Hugo Gernsback

1965

- No award given

1966

- David H. Keller

1967

- Edmond Hamilton

1968

- Jack Williamson

1969

- Murray Leinster

=== 1970s ===
1970

- Virgil Finlay

1971

- John W. Campbell

1972

- C. L. Moore

1973

- Clifford D. Simak

1974

- Forrest J Ackerman
- Sam Moskowitz

1975

- Donald A. Wollheim

1976

- Harry Bates

1977

- Frank Belknap Long

1978

- E. Hoffmann Price

1979

- Raymond Z. Gallun

=== 1980s ===
1980

- George O. Smith

1981

- Stanton A. Coblentz

1982

- William L. Crawford

1983

- Manly Wade Wellman

1984

- H. L. Gold

1985

- Robert Bloch
- Wilson Tucker

1986

- Julius Schwartz
- Donald Wandrei

1987

- Beatrice Mahaffey

1988

- Lloyd Eshbach
- Charles Hornig
- Neil R Jones
- David Kyle

1989

- L. Sprague de Camp
- Donald Grant
- Frederik Pohl

=== 1990s ===
1990

- Edd Cartier
- Robert A. Madle
- Alex Schomburg

1991

- Robert A. W. Lowndes

1992

- Nelson S. Bond
- J. Harvey Haggard
- Art Saha
- Art Widner

1993

- Ray Beam

1994

- E. F. Bleiler
- Andre Norton

1995

- Jack Speer
- Harry Warner, Jr.

1996

- Frank K. Kelly
- Erle M. Korshak

1997

- Hal Clement

1998

- Jack Agnew
- John Baltadonis
- Milton A. Rothman

1999

- A. Langley Searles

=== 2000s ===
2000

- Martin Greenberg

2001

- Frank M. Robinson

2002

- Sir Arthur C. Clarke

2003

- Philip José Farmer

2004

- Brian Aldiss
- William L. Hamling
- Robert C. Peterson

2005

- Howard Devore

2006

- Joseph L. Hensley

2007

- Algis Budrys

2008

- Mike Ashley
- Ray Harryhausen

2009

- James E. Gunn
- Ben C. Indick

=== 2010s ===
2010

- Terry Jeeves
- Joseph P. Martino

2011

- Jay Kay Klein

2012

- Ray Bradbury
- Larry Farsace
- Claude Held
- Jack Robins

2013

- Sam Basham
- Earl Kemp
- Lester Mayer
- Norman F. Stanley

2014

- John Clute

2015

- Julian May

2016

- Ben Bova
- Joseph Wrzos

2017

- Les and Esther Cole

2018

- Robert Silverberg

2019

- Ray Faraday Nelson

=== 2020s ===
2020

- Roger Sims

2021

- William F. Nolan

2022

- George W. Price

2023

- Michael Moorcock
- Will Murray

2024

- Mary and Bill Burns
- David Langford

2025

- Vincent Docherty

2026

- Mike Glyer
- Craig Miller
- Bjo Trimble
