= The Robot and the Man =

1953 anthology of science fiction short stories edited by Martin Greenberg

- Dust-jacket from the first edition
- Editor: Martin Greenberg
- Cover artist: Ric Binkley
- Language: English
- Genre: Science fiction
- Publisher: Gnome Press
- Publication date: 1953
- Publication place: United States
- Media type: Print (hardback)
- Pages: 251
- OCLC: 1143109

The Robot and the Man is a 1953 anthology of science fiction short stories regarding robots edited by Martin Greenberg. The stories originally appeared in the magazines Astounding SF and Galaxy Science Fiction.

== Contents ==
- Foreword, by Martin Greenberg
- "The Mechanical Answer", by John D. MacDonald
- "Self Portrait", by Bernard Wolfe
- "Deadlock", by Lewis Padgett
- "Robinc", by Anthony Boucher using his H. H. Holmes pseudonym
- "Burning Bright", by Robert Moore Williams using his John S. Browning pseudonym
- "Final Command", by A. E. van Vogt
- "Though Dreamers Die", by Lester del Rey
- "Rust", by Joseph E. Kelleam
- "Robots Return", by Robert Moore Williams
- "Into Thy Hands", by Lester del Rey

== Reception ==
P. Schuyler Miller reported that "the theme hangs together very well," with some "whittling" by the editor to make the stories seem more consistent. He noted that many of the better stories regarding robots had already been anthologized elsewhere.
