= Gnome Press =

Defunct American small-press publishing company

- Status: Defunct 1962
- Founded: 1948
- Founder: Martin Greenberg and David A. Kyle
- Defunct: 1962
- Country of origin: United States
- Headquarters location: New York City
- Publication types: Books
- Fiction genres: science fiction

Gnome Press was an American small-press publishing company active 1948 – 1962 and primarily known for fantasy and science fiction, many later regarded as classics.

Gnome was one of the most eminent of the fan publishers of SF, producing 86 titles in its lifespan. Gnome was important in the transitional period between the genre's publication mainly in magazines up to the 1940s to mainly paperback books in the 1960s, but the company proved too underfunded to make the leap from fan-based publishing to the professional level. The company existed for just over a decade, ultimately failing due to inability to compete with major publishers who also started to publish science fiction.

In its heyday, Gnome published many major American SF authors of the era. In some cases, Gnome was the first to collect in book form narratives that were first published as separate stories, with Robert E. Howard's Conan series (published in six books from 1950 – 1955) and Isaac Asimov's Foundation series (published in three books from 1951 – 1953),

== Foundation ==
The company was founded in 1948 by Martin Greenberg and David A. Kyle, New York science fiction fans and members of the Hydra Club; Kyle was also a Futurian. Greenberg had previously been a partner of specialty press New Collectors Group, which had published The Black Wheel. The address was Gnome Press, Inc., 80 E. 11th St. New York 3, N.Y. Kyle contributed less and less to the press as other business interests took up more of his time.

Greenberg should not be confused with later SF anthologist Martin H. Greenberg, nor his company with the imprint Greenberg: Publisher, a separate firm established in 1924 and producing some science fiction between 1950 and 1958. There was no association between the two publishers, despite a common assumption among some fans.

== History ==
Gnome Press concentrated on authors who were at the height of their popularity writing for Astounding Science Fiction, the American leading science fiction magazine of the time. Authors published by Gnome included Poul Anderson, Isaac Asimov, Arthur C Clarke, L. Sprague de Camp, Gordon R. Dickson, Robert A. Heinlein, C. L. Moore, Andre Norton (as Andrew North), Clifford D. Simak, and A. E. Van Vogt.

Gnome's early books were well-printed and featured jacket work by Edd Cartier. Gnome editions featured illustrative material (cover art, illustrations, maps and designs) from science fiction artists such as Ric Binkley, Hannes Bok, Chesley Bonestell, Edd Cartier, Lionel Dillon, Frances E. Dunn, Ed Emshwiller, Frank Kelly Freas, James Gibson, Harry Harrison, Mel Hunter, David Kyle, Stan Mack, Murray Tinkelman, L. Robert Tschirky, Walter I. Van der Poel, Jr., and Wallace Wood.

Gnome Press's first book was The Carnelian Cube by Fletcher Pratt and L. Sprague de Camp, an original novel originally contracted by the New Collectors Group. It was the first to publish Isaac Asimov's I, Robot and Foundation Trilogy, brought Robert E. Howard's Conan the Barbarian stories back from pulp obscurity, first published Arthur C. Clarke, and introduced science fiction's first themed anthology, Men Against the Stars. The latter was followed by such other theme anthologies as Journey to Infinity, The Robot and the Man, Travellers of Space, All About the Future, and a book of articles about the future as seen from a science fictional point of view, Coming Attractions.

The press also published many of Robert A. Heinlein's classics, and Children of the Atom by Wilmar Shiras. Andre Norton worked as a reader for Gnome Press in the 1950s, and also had two of her novels, Plague Ship and Sargasso of Space, published by the company under the pseudonym "Andrew North".

Controversy surrounds the Gnome Press editions of Robert E. Howard's "Conan" stories. Though it placed the material in print for the first time since its original appearance in Weird Tales, the seven volumes it published also included one not written by Howard (The Return of Conan) and one of non-Conan Howard stories rewritten as Conan by L. Sprague de Camp (Tales of Conan). The works Gnome published in the Conan series are Conan the Conqueror (1950), The Sword of Conan (1952), The Coming of Conan (1953), King Conan (1953), Conan the Barbarian (1954), Tales of Conan (1955), and The Return of Conan (1957).

The worst selling book in Gnome Press history was 1955's new novel Reprieve from Paradise by H. Chandler Elliott.

Many of Gnome's titles were reprinted in England by Boardman Books.

== Book club ==
As Gnome Press started to publish new books, Greenberg and Kyle set up the Fantasy Book Club, a subscription service designed to sell Gnome publications and books from other publishers at a discount. They also produced calendars featuring the black and white fantasy art of Hannes Bok and Edd Cartier. In the waning years of the company (1955 – 1961), Gnome Press bought small quantities of unbound signatures from the defunct specialty publisher Fantasy Press and had them cheaply bound to be sold through its Pick-A-Book operation (a later, revised incarnation of the Fantasy Book Club), an early form of direct-mail sales that formed the basic idea for Doubleday's more successful Science Fiction Book Club. Most of the Gnome Press books were hardcover, but some few titles saw later paperback editions as Greenberg experimented, using his remaining stock of unbound sheets, with several titles bound in inexpensive paper covers as a test to see if such an effort could help to keep the company afloat. But with his Pick-A-Book hardcover titles already going for as little as $1.00 per book, the experiment did not save enough money to be profitable and was dropped (and these few paperbound titles are among the scarcest of Gnome Press collectibles today).

== Failure ==
Gnome Press did not have much capital or access to distribution facilities, and relied on selling its books directly to fans by mail. According to Filmfax, Greenberg couldn't keep top science fiction and fantasy writers, who wanted more money and went over to bigger publishers like Doubleday. The larger publishers had more money, marketing and distribution outlets (the ability to sell wholesale to bookstores). Financial mismanagement also cut into Gnome's ability to retain authors. The company was notorious for not paying its writers royalties due, which is ultimately what led to its failure. Author Isaac Asimov claimed he was never paid for the publication of the Foundation books, and called Greenberg "an outright crook". In his biography, I. Asimov: A Memoir, Asimov provides a short chapter on his own frustrating interactions with Gnome Press, as well as some good detail on its publisher, Martin Greenberg. Asimov and other authors were able eventually to get back the rights to their books so they could go to other, more lucrative deals.

Martin Greenberg continued to cut costs at Gnome Press, through smaller editions, cheaper paper, and various promotions to sell back inventory. He was ultimately forced to close due to financial troubles, and Gnome folded in 1962 due to a long drawn-out lawsuit, leaving Arkham House the only American viable small press in the science fiction and fantasy field. When Gnome Press went out of business, it was $100,000 in debt.

Greenberg died in the fall of 2013, and Kyle in the fall of 2016.

== Legacy ==
Gnome Press publications are collected, and many of the books in well used condition can be inexpensively obtained (as of 2015 Amazon.com was offering several in the $10–$20 range). Other items are expensive. Highly desirable examples are quite scarce due to the low quality materials typically used, especially in later publications, as well as the limited distribution. The calendars are particularly scarce. Among the books I, Robot, either in hardcover form or the Armed Forces paperback edition set from its plates, is in particular demand.

== Works published ==
=== 1940s ===
- The Carnelian Cube, by L. Sprague de Camp and Fletcher Pratt (1948)
- The Porcelain Magician, by Frank Owen (1948)
- Pattern for Conquest, by George O. Smith (1949)
- Sixth Column, by Robert A. Heinlein (1949)
- The Thirty-First of February, by Nelson Bond (1949)

=== 1950s ===
- Men Against the Stars, edited by Martin Greenberg (1950)
- The Castle of Iron, by L. Sprague de Camp and Fletcher Pratt (1950)
- Minions of the Moon, by William Gray Beyer (1950)
- Conan the Conqueror, by Robert E. Howard (1950)
- I, Robot, by Isaac Asimov (1950)
- Cosmic Engineers, by Clifford D. Simak (1950)
- Seetee Ship, by Will Stewart (1951)
- Tomorrow and Tomorrow & The Fairy Chessmen, by Lewis Padgett (1951)
- Renaissance, by Raymond F. Jones (1951)
- Typewriter in the Sky & Fear, by L. Ron Hubbard (1951)
- Travelers of Space, edited by Martin Greenberg (1951)
- Journey to Infinity, edited by Martin Greenberg (1951)
- Foundation, by Isaac Asimov (1951)
- The Mixed Men, by A. E. van Vogt (1952)
- City, by Clifford D. Simak (1952)
- Robots Have No Tails, by Lewis Padgett (1952)
- Judgment Night, by C.L. Moore (1952)
- The Sword of Conan, by Robert E. Howard (1952)
- Five Science Fiction Novels, edited by Martin Greenberg (1952)
- Sands of Mars, by Arthur C. Clarke (1952)
- The Starmen, by Leigh Brackett (1952)
- Foundation and Empire, by Isaac Asimov (1952)
- Children of the Atom, by Wilmar H. Shiras (1953)
- Space Lawyer, by Nat Schachner (1953)
- Mutant, by Lewis Padgett (1953)
- Shambleau and Others, by C.L. Moore (1953)
- The Complete Book of Outer Space, edited by Jeffrey Logan (1953)
- The Coming of Conan, by Robert E. Howard (1953)
- King Conan, by Robert E. Howard (1953)
- The Robot and the Man, edited by Martin Greenberg (1953)
- Iceworld, by Hal Clement (1953)
- Against the Fall of Night, by Arthur C. Clarke (1953)
- Second Foundation, by Isaac Asimov (1953)
- Conan the Barbarian, by Robert E. Howard (1954)
- Undersea Quest, by Frederik Pohl and Jack Williamson (1954)
- Mel Oliver and Space Rover on Mars, by William Morrison (1954)
- Northwest of Earth, by C.L. Moore (1954)
- The Forgotten Planet, by Murray Leinster (1954)
- Lost Continents, by L. Sprague de Camp (1954)
- Prelude to Space, by Arthur C. Clarke (1954)
- Star Bridge, by Jack Williamson and James E. Gunn (1955)
- Address: Centauri, by F.L. Wallace (1955)
- Sargasso of Space, by Andrew North (1955)
- Tales of Conan, by Robert E. Howard (1955)
- This Fortress World, by James E. Gunn (1955)
- All About the Future, edited by Martin Greenberg (1955)
- Reprieve from Paradise, by H. Chandler Elliott (1955)
- Science Fiction Terror Tales, edited by Groff Conklin (1955)
- Highways in Hiding, by George O. Smith (1956)
- Undersea Fleet, by Frederik Pohl and Jack Williamson (1956)
- Plague Ship, by Andrew North (1956)
- SF: The Year's Greatest Science Fiction and Fantasy, edited by Judith Merril (1956)
- Interplanetary Hunter, by Arthur K. Barnes (1956)
- The Shrouded Planet, by Robert Randall (pseudonym of Robert Silverberg and Randall Garrett) (1957)
- The Return of Conan, by Bjorn Nyberg and L. Sprague de Camp (1957)
- SF '57: The Year's Greatest Science Fiction and Fantasy, edited by Judith Merril (1957)
- Colonial Survey, by Murray Leinster (1957)
- Two Sought Adventure, by Fritz Leiber (1957)
- Coming Attractions, edited by Martin Greenberg (1957)
- They'd Rather Be Right, by Mark Clifton and Frank Riley (1957)
- The Seedling Stars, by James Blish (1957)
- Earthman's Burden, by Poul Anderson and Gordon R. Dickson (1957)
- Path of Unreason, by George O. Smith (1958)
- Starman's Quest, by Robert Silverberg (1958)
- Undersea City, by Frederik Pohl and Jack Williamson (1958)
- Tros of Samothrace, by Talbot Mundy (1958)
- SF '58: The Year's Greatest Science Fiction and Fantasy, edited by Judith Merril (1958)
- Methuselah's Children, by Robert A. Heinlein (1958)
- The Survivors, by Tom Godwin (1958)
- The Bird of Time, by Wallace West (1959)
- The Dawning Light, by Robert Randall (pseudonym of Robert Silverberg and Randall Garrett) (1959)
- Purple Pirate, by Talbot Mundy (1959)
- SF '59: The Year's Greatest Science Fiction and Fantasy, edited by Judith Merril (1958)
- The Unpleasant Profession of Jonathan Hoag, by Robert A. Heinlein (1959)
- The Menace from Earth, by Robert A. Heinlein (1959)

=== 1960s ===
- The Vortex Blaster, by Edward E. Smith (1960)
- Agent of Vega, by James H. Schmitz (1960)
- Drunkard's Walk, by Frederik Pohl (1960)
- Invaders from the Infinite, by John W. Campbell, Jr. (1961)
- Gray Lensman, by Edward E. Smith, Ph.D. (1951) (Note: Gnome Press reprinted this book directly from the Fantasy Press edition, including the "First Edition" statement, even though it is a reprint edition, making it one of the most notoriously tricky titles for collectors of science fiction first editions.)
- The Philosophical Corps, by Everett B. Cole (1962)
