= Journey to Infinity =

1951 anthology edited by Martin Greenberg

- Dust-jacket from the first edition
- Editor: Martin Greenberg
- Cover artist: Edd Cartier
- Language: English
- Genre: Science fiction
- Publisher: Gnome Press
- Publication date: 1951
- Publication place: United States
- Media type: Print (hardback)
- Pages: 381

Journey to Infinity is a 1951 anthology of science fiction short stories edited by Martin Greenberg. The stories originally appeared in the magazines Astounding SF, Amazing Stories and Future Science Fiction.

== Contents ==
- Foreword, by Martin Greenberg
- Introduction, by Fletcher Pratt
- "False Dawn", by A. Bertram Chandler
- "Atlantis", by Edward E. Smith, Ph.D.
- "Letter to a Phoenix", by Fredric Brown
- "Unite and Conquer", by Theodore Sturgeon
- "Breakdown", by Jack Williamson
- "Dance of a New World", by John D. MacDonald
- "Mother Earth", by Isaac Asimov
- "There Shall Be Darkness", by C. L. Moore
- "Taboo", by Fritz Leiber
- "Overthrow", by Cleve Cartmill
- "Barrier of Dread", by Judith Merril
- "Metamorphosite", by Eric Frank Russell

== Reception ==
Groff Conklin wrote that the idea of a collection of "possible pasts and futures for man" was fascinating, but the book was "somewhat uneven" and dissatisfying to those familiar with science fiction. He said that 12 stories were not enough, criticizing the lack of stories from Robert Heinlein's Future History, Clifford D. Simak's City, or Lewis Padgett's "Baldy" series. Villiers Gerson, writing in Astounding Science Fiction, complained that nearly half the stories in the book were "second-rate", selected to fit in along thematic lines rather than for their own merit. The New York Times noted that the anthology presented "the science-fictional History of Man."

== Sources ==
- Chalker, Jack L.; Mark Owings (1998). The Science-Fantasy Publishers: A Bibliographic History, 1923-1998. Westminster, MD and Baltimore: Mirage Press, Ltd. p. 300.
- Contento, William G. "Index to Science Fiction Anthologies and Collections". Archived from the original on 2008-06-27.
