= The Black Wheel =

1947 novel by Hannes Bok

- First edition
- Author: Hannes Bok
- Language: English
- Genre: Fantasy
- Publisher: New Collectors Group
- Publication date: 1947
- Publication place: United States
- Media type: Print (Hardcover)
- Pages: 115 (oversize)

The Black Wheel is a fantasy novel by American writers A. Merritt and Hannes Bok. Merritt had completed the first seven chapters, roughly 20,000 words, before his death in 1943. Bok wrote the remainder of the novel, twenty chapters of more than 60,000 words, working from "a sketchy plot outline" left by Merritt. The story concerns the discovery of a centuries-old shipwreck, complete with the preserved bodies of its crew, and the consequences for the passengers and crew of the cruise ship that comes across it.

== Publication history ==
The Black Wheel was originally published in 1947, by the specialty publisher New Collectors Group, in a stated hardcover edition of 1000 copies (although more were reportedly printed). According to Robert Weinberg: "The New Collectors Group was the joint effort of Paul Dennis O'Connor, Stanley Mullen and Martin Greenberg (not to be confused with Martin H. Greenberg). Their first two hardcovers were The Fox Woman and Blue Pagoda and The Black Wheel, both by A. Merritt and Hannes Bok. Bok was a science fiction artist and a lifelong fan of Merritt's work. The two books were short novels begun but never finished by Merritt. Bok finished both novels and provided the illustrations for the books as well. Both books did reasonably well considering that neither story was very good. The company broke up early in 1948 when the other partners grew disillusioned with O'Connor's business practices. Greenberg withdrew from the press and with another fan, David Kyle, formed Gnome Press."

In 1976, The Black Wheel was included in an omnibus collection of Merritt-Bok collaborations issued by Arno Press. A mass market paperback was released by Avon Books in 1981.

== Reception ==
Sam Moskowitz, reviewing the original edition, noted that the Merritt sections were unlike most of his other work, particularly since "The introduction of characters and the initial build-up is almost leisurely," concluding that "Bok has done a commendable job of completing the novel." E. F. Bleiler, however, found Bok's effort "not a very good job" (although he praised Bok's illustrations). Thrilling Wonder Stories reviewed the novel tepidly, describing it as "an entertaining oddity" even though the characters were undeveloped, the supernatural events too numerous and too repetitive, and the story "so fantastic that it stretches credibility close to the snapping point". Baird Searles, reviewing the 1981 reissue, declared the novel "years ahead of its time", although noting that some aspects of the writing had dated badly. and concluded that Bok had captured "the dreamlike -- or nightmarish -- quality that Merritt often achieved, though he never attains the extravagant, baroque splendor of Merritt at his best".
