= Five Science Fiction Novels =

1952 anthology of five science fiction novellas edited by Martin Greenberg

- Dust-jacket from the first edition.
- Editor: Martin Greenberg
- Cover artist: Frank Kelly Freas
- Language: English
- Genre: Science fiction
- Publisher: Gnome Press
- Publication date: 1952
- Publication place: United States
- Media type: Print (hardback)
- Pages: 282

Five Science Fiction Novels is a 1952 anthology of five science fiction novellas edited by Martin Greenberg. The stories originally appeared in the magazines Unknown and Astounding SF.

== Contents ==
- But Without Horns, by Norvell W. Page
- Destiny Times Three, by Fritz Leiber
- Crisis in Utopia, by Norman L. Knight
- The Chronicler, by A. E. van Vogt
- The Crucible of Power, by Jack Williamson

== Reception ==
The New York Times reviewer Basil Davenport reported the anthology contained "three hits, one near miss, and one bad miss," declaring it "almost always at least entertaining, and at its best provocative." Davenport faulted "The Crucible of Power" as "no more than a short story," and found "Crisis in Utopia," although attractively imaged, to be weakly plotted. Of the "hits," he described "But Without Horns" as a familiar tale "told with real suspense; reported "The Chronicler" to be a typical van Vogt story where action kept the reader's interest even when the ideas became murky; and praised "Destiny Times Three" as the book's high point.

== Sources ==
- Chalker, Jack L.; Mark Owings (1998). The Science-Fantasy Publishers: A Bibliographic History, 1923-1998. Westminster, MD and Baltimore: Mirage Press, Ltd. p. 301.
- Contento, William G. "Index to Science Fiction Anthologies and Collections". Archived from the original on 2008-06-27.
