= Destiny Times Three =

1945 novel by Fritz Leiber

- Cover of the first edition
- Author: Fritz Leiber
- Language: English
- Genre: Science fiction
- Publisher: Galaxy Science Fiction Novels
- Publication date: 1957 (standalone)
- Publication place: United States
- Media type: Print (Paperback)
- Pages: 126

Destiny Times Three is an alternate timeline 1945 science fiction novel by American writer Fritz Leiber. It first appeared in Astounding Science Fiction in March and April 1945. In 1952 it featured in Five Science Fiction Novels published by Gnome Press. Its first appearance as a standalone novel came in 1957 when published by Galaxy Science Fiction Novels.

== Plot summary ==
The Probability Engine made differing timelines a reality: alternate universes real enough to exist side by side – and to be invaded ...
