= NYcon =

NYcon is the name given to three Worldcons held in New York City.

1. NYcon I, 1939
2. NYcon II (a.k.a. NeYorCon), 1956
3. NYcon 3, 1967
