= Columbus Was a Dope =

Short story by Robert A. Heinlein

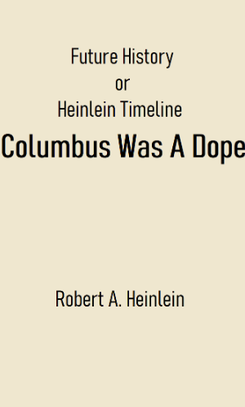
- Author: Robert A. Heinlein
- Language: English
- Genre: Science fiction
- Published: May 1947 (initial publication)
- Publication place: United States
- The story takes place in a bar on the Moon, where patrons debate the merits of space exploration in comparison to Columbus's discovery of the New World.

"Columbus Was a Dope" is a science fiction short story by American writer Robert A. Heinlein. It was first published in the May 1947 issue of Startling Stories. It later appeared in two of Heinlein's collections, The Menace from Earth (1959), and Off the Main Sequence: The Other Science Fiction Stories of Robert A. Heinlein (2005).

== Plot summary ==
Two bar patrons and a bartender debate building a generation ship to Proxima Centauri. One favors space exploration as benefiting society like Christopher Columbus's discovery of the New World; the other insists that "Columbus was a dope" and should have stayed home. At the end of the story, it is revealed that the bar is on the Moon.

== Release ==
"Columbus Was a Dope" was first published in the May 1947 issue of Startling Stories. It was subsequently released in the anthology collection Travelers of Space in 1951, through Gnome Press.

== Reception ==
William H. Patterson Jr. claimed that "Columbus Was a Dope," along with other stories collected in The Menace from Earth, occurs within Heinlein's World as Myth framework, stating that they "are happening somewhere else in the Multiverse, somewhere quite close by the Future History."
