= Hydra Club =

The Hydra Club was a social organization of science fiction professionals and fans. It met in New York City during the 1940s and 1950s.

== History ==
It was founded October 25, 1947 in the apartment of Judith Merril and Frederik Pohl on Grove Street in the Greenwich Village neighborhood of New York. As nine founders were present, the club took its name from the legendary nine-headed monster, the Hydra.

Among its members were Lester del Rey, David A. Kyle, Frederik Pohl, Judith Merril, Martin Greenberg, Robert W. Lowndes, Philip Klass, Jack Gillespie, David Reiner, L. Jerome Stanton, Fletcher and Inga Pratt, Willy Ley, George O. Smith, Basil Davenport, Sam Merwin, Harry Harrison, Jerome Bixby, Groff Conklin, Bea Mahaffey, Murray Leinster, Jack Coggins, Avram Davidson and J. Harry Dockweiler.

An article by Merril about the club in the November 1951 Marvel Science Fiction was accompanied by Harry Harrison's drawing caricaturing 41 members:

- Basil Davenport
- Bruce Elliott
- Charles Dye
- Damon Knight
- Daniel Keyes
- David A. Kyle
- Evelyn Harrison
- Fletcher Pratt
- Frank Belknap Long
- Frederik Pohl
- Fredric Brown
- George C. Smith
- Groff Conklin
- H. Beam Piper
- H. L. Gold
- Hans Stefan Santesson
- Harry Harrison
- Isaac Asimov
- James A. Williams
- Jerome Bixby
- Judith Merril
- Katherine MacLean Dye
- L. Jerome Stanton
- L. Sprague de Camp
- Larry T. Shaw
- Lester Del Rey
- Lois Miles Gillespie
- Margaret Bertrand
- Martin Greenberg
- Olga Ley
- Oswald Train
- Philip Klass
- Richard Wilson
- Robert W. Lowndes
- Sam Bowne
- Sam Merwin, Jr.
- Theodore Sturgeon
- Thomas S. Gardner
- Walter I. Bradbury
- Walter Kubilius
- Willy Ley

Harrison's caption adds, "The remaining twenty-odd members showed up too late at the meeting."

On April 29, 1984, Judith Merril, by then living in Toronto, founded a similar group for the burgeoning science-fiction community there, which she dubbed Hydra North.

Author Harlan Ellison discussed the Hydra Club and the inspiration for L. Ron Hubbard's founding of Scientology in an interview with Robin Williams.
