= All About the Future =

1953 anthology of science fiction short stories selected by Martin Greenberg

- Dust-jacket from the first edition
- Editor: Martin Greenberg
- Cover artist: Ed Emshwiller
- Language: English
- Genre: Science fiction
- Publisher: Gnome Press
- Publication date: 1955
- Publication place: United States
- Media type: Print (hardback)
- Pages: 252
- OCLC: 1371112

All About the Future is a 1953 anthology of science fiction short stories selected by American editor Martin Greenberg. The stories originally appeared in the magazines Astounding SF, Galaxy Science Fiction and the Boston University Graduate Journal.

== Contents ==
- Foreword, by Martin Greenberg
- "Where To?", by Robert A. Heinlein
- "Let’s Not", by Isaac Asimov
- "The Midas Plague", by Frederik Pohl
- "Un-Man", by Poul Anderson
- "Granny Won’t Knit", by Theodore Sturgeon
- "Natural State", by Damon Knight
- "Hobo God", by Malcolm Jameson
- "Blood Bank", by Walter M. Miller, Jr.
- "Origins of Galactic Etiquette", by Edward Wellen
- "Origins of Galactic Law", by Edward Wellen
- "Origins of Galactic Slang", by Edward Wellen
- "Origins of Galactic Medicine", by Edward Wellen

== Sources ==
- Chalker, Jack L.; Mark Owings (1998). The Science-Fantasy Publishers: A Bibliographic History, 1923-1998. Westminster, MD and Baltimore: Mirage Press, Ltd. p. 304.
- Contento, William G. "Index to Science Fiction Anthologies and Collections". Archived from the original on 2008-06-27.
