= Pattern for Conquest =

1949 novel by George O. Smith

- Dust-jacket from the first book edition.
- Author: George O. Smith
- Cover artist: Edd Cartier
- Language: English
- Genre: Science fiction
- Publisher: Gnome Press
- Publication date: 1949
- Publication place: United States
- Media type: Print (hardback & paperback)
- Pages: 252
- OCLC: 1591187

Pattern for Conquest is a science fiction novel by American writer George O. Smith. It was published in 1949 by Gnome Press Reprinted circa 1952 in paper wrappers for distribution to US military personnel. Although a later printing, the first edition statement is retained on the copyright page. [Currey] isfdb Currey

== Plot introduction ==
The novel concerns Earthmen who are overwhelmed by alien invaders, whom they then attempt to conquer from within.

== Reception ==
P. Schuyler Miller reported that the novel showed "that he [Smith] can slip right in with "Skylark" Smith and "World Wreckers" Hamilton and slap the stars around."

== Sources ==
- Chalker, Jack L.; Mark Owings (1998). The Science-Fantasy Publishers: A Bibliographic History, 1923-1998. Westminster, MD and Baltimore: Mirage Press, Ltd. p. 298.
- Tuck, Donald H. (1978). The Encyclopedia of Science Fiction and Fantasy. Chicago: Advent. p. 400. ISBN 0-911682-22-8.
