= Other Worlds, Universe Science Fiction, and Science Stories =

Two related US science fiction magazines

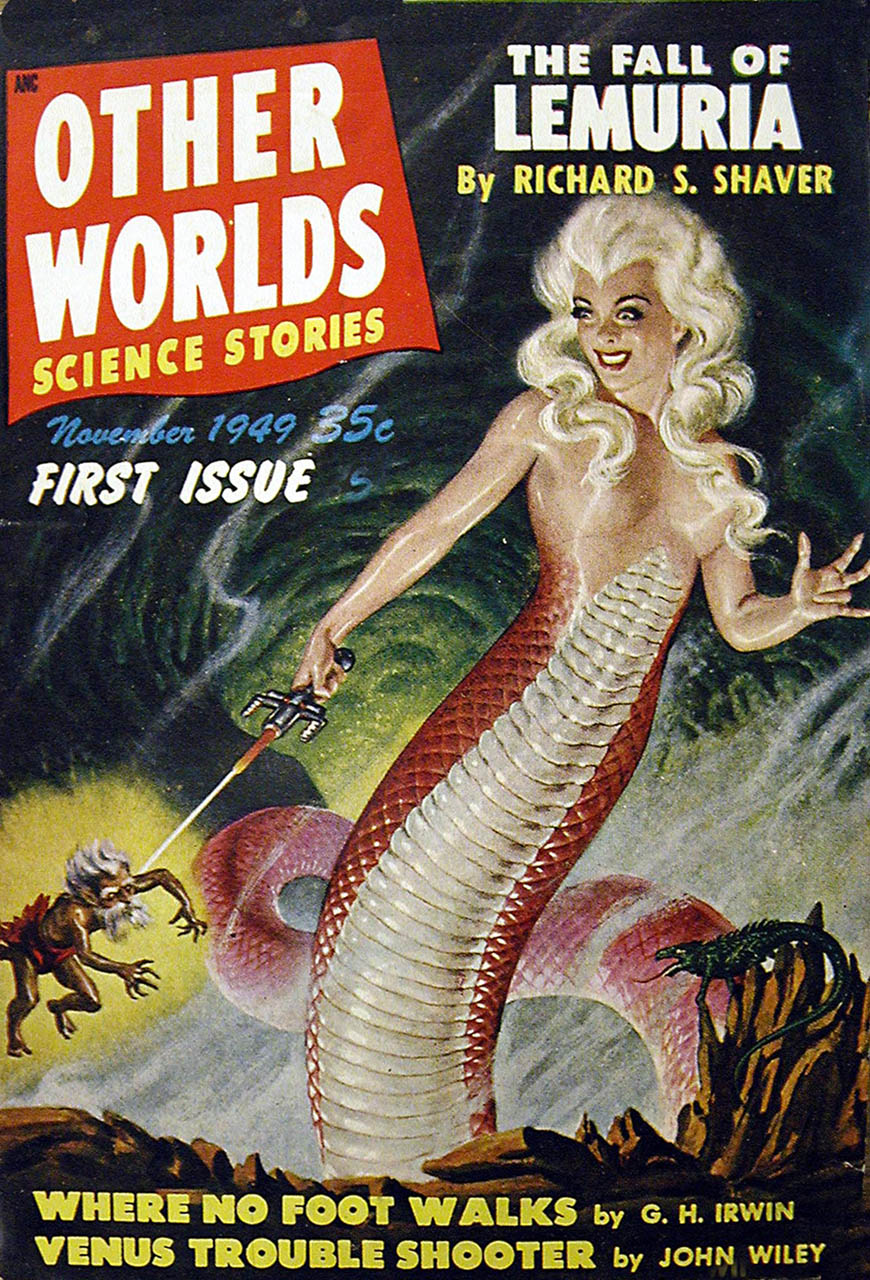
The first issue of Other Worlds, dated November 1949; cover art by Malcolm Smith

Other Worlds, Universe Science Fiction, and Science Stories were three related US magazines edited by Raymond A. Palmer. Other Worlds was launched in November 1949 by Palmer's Clark Publications and lasted for four years in its first run, with well-received stories such as "Enchanted Village" by A. E. van Vogt and "Way in the Middle of the Air", one of Ray Bradbury's "Martian Chronicle" stories. Since Palmer was both publisher and editor, he was free to follow his own editorial policy, and presented a wide array of science fiction.

Palmer entered a partnership with a Chicago businessman in 1953 to create Bell Publications, and printed Universe Science Fiction from June 1953. Palmer used the new company to abandon Other Worlds and launch Science Stories, in order to escape from Clark Publications' financial difficulties. Hence Science Stories can be considered a continuation of Other Worlds. Science Stories was visually attractive but contained no memorable fiction. Universe, on the other hand, was drab in appearance, but included some well-received stories, such as Theodore Sturgeon's "The World Well Lost", which examined homosexuality, a controversial topic for the time.

Palmer's Chicago partner lost interest, so Palmer took over both Science Stories and Universe Science Fiction under a new company. In 1955 he ceased publication of both magazines and brought back Other Worlds, numbering the issues to make the new magazine appear a continuation of both the original Other Worlds and also of Universe. In this new incarnation the magazine was less successful, but did print Marion Zimmer Bradley's first novel, Falcons of Narabedla. In 1957 Palmer changed the focus of the magazine to unidentified flying objects (UFOs), retitling it Flying Saucers from Other Worlds, and after the September 1957 issue no more fiction appeared. Palmer eventually settled on Flying Saucers, Mysteries of the Space Age as the title, and in that form it survived until June 1976.

== Publishing history ==
	Jan	Feb	Mar	Apr	May	Jun	Jul	Aug	Sep	Oct	Nov	Dec
1949											1/1	
1950	1/2		1/3		1/4		2/1		2/2	2/3	2/4	
1951	3/1		3/2		3/3	3/4			4/1	3/6		3/7
1952	3/5		4/2	4/3		4/4	4/5	4/6		4/7	4/8	4/9
1953	5/1	5/2	5/3	5/4	5/5	5/6	5/7					
The first four years of Other Worlds, showing volume and issue number. Palmer was editor throughout.

In 1945, Raymond Palmer, the editor of Amazing Stories, published "I Remember Lemuria", by Richard Shaver, in the March 1945 issue. The story, about prehistoric civilizations, explained all the disasters on Earth as the work of evil robots. Palmer presented the story as a mixture of truth and fiction, and the response from readers was strong enough that he bought more stories from Shaver, and promoted what he called the "Shaver Mystery". Circulation grew dramatically, but the publisher, Ziff-Davis, became alarmed at the ridicule the stories were drawing in the press, and ordered Palmer to tone down the material. Palmer complied, but planned to leave. He formed his own publishing company, Clark Publications, in 1947, and launched Fate in 1948. In 1949 Palmer left Ziff-Davis, and launched Other Worlds Science Stories in digest format; the editor was listed as Robert N. Webster, a pseudonym Palmer used to conceal his activities since he was still working at Ziff-Davis when the first issue appeared. Palmer had planned to distribute free copies of the first issue to fans at that year's World Science Fiction Convention in Cincinnati. Printing delays meant the magazine did not appear until late in the year. At the convention Palmer announced that "Robert N. Webster" was his pseudonym, and gave the convention organizers the original artwork for the first issue for auction. He also met, and immediately hired, Bea Mahaffey, a Cleveland fan, as his managing editor, starting with the fourth issue, dated May 1950.

Palmer planned another science fiction (sf) title, Imagination, to be launched in the fall of 1950, but in June, he suffered a serious accident and was temporarily paralyzed, and Mahaffey took over in his absence. Palmer was able to help with editing both magazines even while in the hospital, but by September he decided to sell Imagination to William Hamling, and keep Other Worlds. Despite the high cover price of 35 cents, Other Worlds did well enough for Palmer to increase the publication frequency from bimonthly to every six weeks, but faced competition from two new magazines launched at about the same time: The Magazine of Fantasy & Science Fiction, the first issue of which had appeared at the end of 1949, and Galaxy Science Fiction, which published its first issue in October 1950. Both were very successful, with higher budgets than Palmer was able to afford, and Other Worlds suffered as a result. The magazine was doing well enough for Palmer to move it to monthly publication at the end of 1952. It stayed on a regular schedule until the July 1953 issue, but Palmer's finances eventually worsened to the point that he was unable to pay his printer.

	Jan	Feb	Mar	Apr	May	Jun	Jul	Aug	Sep	Oct	Nov	Dec
1953										1		2
1954		3		4								
The four issues of Science Stories, showing issue number; all four were edited by Palmer and Mahaffey.

Palmer was contacted by a Chicago businessman interested in starting a sf magazine, and took the opportunity to resolve his financial problems by forming a new company, Bell Publications, in partnership with the businessman (whose name was never revealed), and starting two magazines: Universe Science Fiction and Science Stories. Universe's first issue appeared in June 1953, while Other Worlds was still being published. It was financed by Palmer's partner, and intended as a bimonthly, though in fact the first four issues were on a quarterly schedule. It was edited by Palmer and Mahaffey, who used the collective pseudonym "George Bell" for the first two issues. Science Stories followed in October, also edited by Palmer and Mahaffey as "George Bell", and published by Bell Publications; this was effectively the same magazine as Other Worlds Science Stories, with "Other Worlds" dropped from the title. In the second issue of Science Stories, Palmer explained the reason for the new magazine: "For a variety of reasons—and let's be honest, most of them were financial—we had to make a spur-of-the-moment decision to discontinue Other Worlds and replace it with the magazine you are now reading. We phoned the typesetter, halted work on the August OW, and lifted the editorial and stories we needed for Science Stories No. 1 from OW material on hand". Subscribers to Other Worlds were given the option to continue their subscription with whichever of the two magazines they preferred.

	Jan	Feb	Mar	Apr	May	Jun	Jul	Aug	Sep	Oct	Nov	Dec
1953						1			2			3
1954			4		5		6		7		8	
1955	9		10		11 (32)		12 (33)		13 (34)		14 (35)	
1956		15 (36)		16 (37)		17 (38)			18 (39)		19 (40)	
1957	20 (41)		21 (42)		22 (43)	23	24	25	26		27	
1958		28			29		30			31		32
Universe and Other Worlds, including the first few issues of Flying Saucers, showing issue numbers. Palmer and Mahaffey edited the ten issues of Universe, and Palmer was the editor for the subsequent issues.

When the anonymous businessman lost interest in the project Palmer bought him out, financed by the sale of his half share in Clark Publications, which had published Other Worlds and Fate. He founded Palmer Publications and took over the new magazines with Universe's third issue and Science Stories' second issue, and abandoned the pseudonym. He launched Mystic Magazine, which, like Fate, published occult material, both fact and fiction. Science Stories failed to sell well, and ceased to appear after the April 1954 issue, but Universe continued, going bimonthly after the March 1954 issue. A total of ten issues appeared under the title Universe Science Fiction, and with the May 1955 issue the title Other Worlds Science Fiction reappeared. The new version of Other Worlds initially carried both Universe's numbering and the issue numbering from the original run of Other Worlds. Palmer closed the offices in Evanston, Illinois, and edited the magazine from his home in Wisconsin; Mahaffey continued to work on the magazine by mail from Cincinnati. From November 1955 the format changed to pulp magazine size: this was against the prevailing market winds, as almost all the pulps had died out by this time. In 1956 an unexpected tax bill forced Palmer to let Mahaffey go, and he ran the magazine by himself from that point on.

The following year Palmer switched the magazine's focus to flying saucers. To try to maintain the existing readership while attracting new readers, Palmer emphasized sf and flying saucers in alternate issues: for example, the June 1957 issue was titled FLYING SAUCERS from Other Worlds, and the July issue was Flying Saucers from OTHER WORLDS. He also hoped that each issue would be kept longer on newsstands if the distributors thought they were dealing with two magazines. The experiment did not last; from the July/August 1958 issue the title was shortened to Flying Saucers, and the magazine ceased to carry fiction. Palmer retired to Amherst, Wisconsin, and took over its printing. Bibliographic sources focus on the science fiction issues, and do not index the magazine after 1958, but it continued publication until 1976 as a non-fiction magazine.

== Contents and reception ==
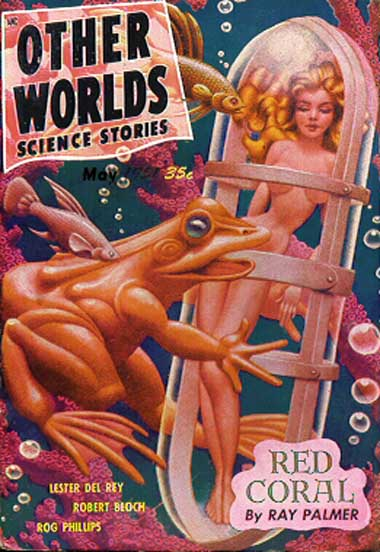
Hannes Bok cover for the May 1951 issue of Other Worlds

Palmer's interest in the Shaver Mystery did not abate when he left Amazing Stories, and the lead story for the first issue of Other Worlds was Shaver's "The Fall of Lemuria", still presented as truth in the guise of fiction. The cover illustration was by Malcolm Smith, a frequent artist for Amazing. Palmer declared in the first issue that he wanted to present science fiction from across the spectrum: hard-science stories of the kind that appeared in Astounding Science Fiction, and stories representative of the styles of the other leading magazines—Amazing, Planet Stories, and Thrilling Wonder Stories. Despite this many of the stories in the first issue were routine. Much of the first issue's contents were by Amazing regulars, and it initially appeared that the new magazine would not be very much different from Palmer's Amazing Stories, but within a few issues the quality improved noticeably.

Unlike almost every other sf magazine on the market, Other Worlds was edited and published by the same person, which meant there were no constraints on Palmer's editorial policy. He attempted to find new and daring material, and in the early years of the magazine, he obtained some of the better stories being published. Mike Ashley, a historian of science fiction, cites Eric Frank Russell's "Dear Devil"; "Portrait of a Narcissus" by Raymond F. Jones; "Way in the Middle of the Air", one of Ray Bradbury's "Martian Chronicles" stories; and two stories by A.E. van Vogt: "Enchanted Village", one of van Vogt's best-liked stories, and "War of Nerves", part of his Voyage of the Space Beagle series. Fritz Leiber contributed "The Seven Black Priests", one of his Fafhrd and the Gray Mouser stories, and E.E. Smith, who had become famous for his space operas, switched to fantasy with "Tedric", which appeared in the March 1953 issue. Poul Anderson and Gordon R. Dickson contributed "Heroes Are Made", the first in their Hoka series, and Palmer obtained fiction from other well-known writers such as Fredric Brown and Wilson Tucker. Partly because of competition from the newly-launched Galaxy Science Fiction and The Magazine of Fantasy & Science Fiction, Palmer was unable to obtain enough material of this quality to fill the magazine, and most of the remaining stories were unremarkable space adventures. Ashley comments that the stigma of the Shaver Mystery clung to Palmer and damaged the magazine; and suggests that much of the best-quality work in Other Worlds was due to the influence of Mahaffey, who in Ashley's opinion "had excellent taste in fiction". A high point of the non-fiction pieces was a series of articles by L. Sprague de Camp, abridged from his book Lost Continents: The Atlantis Theme in History, which ran from 1952 to 1953. The covers were attractive, often with artwork on both covers, by well-known artists such as Malcolm Smith, Robert Gibson Jones, Harold McCauley, and Hannes Bok.

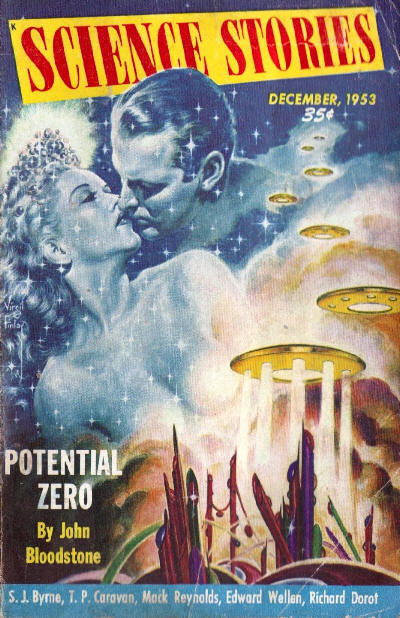
The cover of the December 1953 Science Stories, by Virgil Finlay

Science Stories maintained the same high quality of artwork. The first issue, dated October 1953, was painted by Bok, who also did the interior illustration for Jack Williamson's story based on the cover. The remaining three covers were by Virgil Finlay, Albert A. Nuetzell, and Jones; Wendy Bousfield, an sf historian, considers the last one the best, and also singles out the last issue's interior illustrations, all by Finlay, for praise. The writing was not up to the standard of the artwork, with Jack Williamson and Mack Reynolds the only two authors whose reputation has lasted. A lower page count meant less non-fiction material and readers' departments (such as letters) in Science Stories than in Other Worlds, but Palmer found space for cartoons and advertisements for his own books, such as The Coming of the Saucers, written with Kenneth Arnold.

Science Stories was visually attractive but lacked memorable fiction. Universe Science Fiction took the opposite approach, with uninteresting covers and poor interior artwork, but it had some good stories in the first two issues, which sf historian E.F. Casebeer attributes to Mahaffey's influence. Murray Leinster, Mark Clifton and Mack Reynolds contributed to the early issues, with Robert Bloch, providing "Constant Reader", Theodore Sturgeon, and "The World Well Lost"; a treatment of homosexuality controversial for the 1950s. Once Palmer became more involved with the magazine again the artwork improved, with Finlay, Lawrence Stevens, and Edd Cartier contributing good interior illustrations. In Casebeer's view the Finlay and Lawrence illustrations were the best the magazine had to offer, and he considers the quality of the fiction to have gone downhill after a fairly promising start. In the last three issues the artwork was also weak, with poor quality black-and-white covers and little interior art.

The first issue of the revived Other Worlds, in May 1955, had a black-and-white cover picture; later issues returned to colour, though until 1956 these were all reprints of covers from the first incarnation of the magazine. For the cover of the November 1955 issue (the first in pulp format) Palmer reprinted artwork by J. Allen St. John from the back cover of the November 1952 issue; St. John's artwork had saved another Palmer magazine, Fantastic Adventures, from cancellation in 1939. The quality of the fiction dropped from the occasional highs of the first run of Other Worlds. Falcons of Narabedla, the first novel by Marion Zimmer Bradley, appeared in 1957, and Palmer also bought her first Darkover novel, Sword of Aldones, though he never ran it and eventually returned the manuscript to Bradley. Palmer hoped to publish Tarzan on Mars, a novel by Stuart Byrne that used fictional worlds created by Edgar Rice Burroughs, but he was unable to get authorization from the Burroughs estate, and had to shelve the idea, however, unauthorized editions have been published since then.

Palmer had long been interested in UFOs, and ran an article in Other Worlds in 1951 titled "I Flew in a Flying Saucer", bylined "Captain A.V.G.", though Lester del Rey reports in his history of sf magazines that it may have been written by Palmer himself. Eventually Palmer decided to drop science fiction; from June 1957 only three issues—June, July and September—included fiction; thereafter it was a nonfiction magazine about UFOs. He wrote in the following issue that he would print news of flying saucers and rumors, and would debunk any claims he could prove fake. Over the next twenty years he included such fringe ideas such as that the earth was not spherical, and in December 1959 ran an article in Flying Saucers that claimed the earth was shaped like a donut, and that flying saucers originated from an unexplored source on the earth's surface. In 1965 Palmer published an article by Delmar H. Bryant that debunked the idea that the earth was hollow, but the following year again suggested that the earth might be donut shaped. On the June 1970 issue, the cover picture showed a donut-shaped earth from space; Palmer claimed this was evidence from a satellite photograph.

== Bibliographic details ==
Other Worlds was edited by Raymond Palmer and published by Clark Publications from November 1949 to July 1953, and by Palmer Publications from May 1955 until at least November 1957. Science Stories and Universe Science Fiction were initially published by Bell Publications, for one and two issues, respectively; thereafter both were published by Palmer Publications. Both magazines were edited by Palmer and Bea Mahaffey. Universe and Science Stories were in digest format for all their issues and were priced at 35 cents; Other Worlds began as a digest and switched to pulp with the November 1955 issue, and was 35 cents until at least the end of 1958. Other Worlds had 160 pages for the first run, and 128 pages when it returned in May 1955, dropping to 96 pages for the pulp issues, until at least the November 1957 issue. Both Universe and Science Stories had 128 pages throughout their runs.

After it became a non-fiction magazine, the title changed to Flying Saucers, The Magazine of Space Conquest with the July/August 1958 issue. In 1961 the title changed twice more, first to Flying Saucers, The Magazine of Space Mysteries, and finally to Flying Saucers, Mysteries of the Space Age, which it retained until it ceased publication in 1976.

== Sources ==
- Ashley, Mike (1985a). "Amazing Stories". In Tymn, Marshall B.; Ashley, Mike (eds.). Science Fiction, Fantasy, and Weird Fiction Magazines. Westport, Connecticut: Greenwood Press. pp. 14–49. ISBN 978-0-313-21221-5.
- Ashley, Mike (1985b). "Mystic Magazine". In Tymn, Marshall B.; Ashley, Mike (eds.). Science Fiction, Fantasy, and Weird Fiction Magazines. Westport, Connecticut: Greenwood Press. pp. 417–418. ISBN 978-0-313-21221-5.
- Ashley, Mike (1985c). "Other Worlds Science Stories". In Tymn, Marshall B.; Ashley, Mike (eds.). Science Fiction, Fantasy, and Weird Fiction Magazines. Westport, Connecticut: Greenwood Press. pp. 457–466. ISBN 978-0-313-21221-5.
- Ashley, Mike (2005). Transformations:The Story of the Science-Fiction Magazines from 1950 to 1970. Liverpool: Liverpool University Press. ISBN 978-0-85323-779-2.
- Ashley, Mike (2016). Science Fiction Rebels: The Story of the Science-Fiction Magazines from 1981 to 1990. Liverpool: Liverpool University Press. ISBN 978-1-78138-260-8.
- Bousfield, Wendy (1985). "Science Stories". In Tymn, Marshall B.; Ashley, Mike (eds.). Science Fiction, Fantasy, and Weird Fiction Magazines. Westport, Connecticut: Greenwood Press. pp. 551–555. ISBN 978-0-313-21221-5.
- Casebeer, E.F. (1985). "Universe Science Fiction". In Tymn, Marshall B.; Ashley, Mike (eds.). Science Fiction, Fantasy, and Weird Fiction Magazines. Westport, Connecticut: Greenwood Press. pp. 692–694. ISBN 978-0-313-21221-5.
- del Rey, Lester (1979). The World of Science Fiction: 1926–1976: The History of a Subculture. New York: Del Rey Books. ISBN 978-0-345-25452-8.
- Lawler, Donald L. (1985). "Galaxy Science Fiction". In Tymn, Marshall B.; Ashley, Mike (eds.). Science Fiction, Fantasy, and Weird Fiction Magazines. Westport, Connecticut: Greenwood Press. pp. 290–309. ISBN 978-0-313-21221-5.
- Nadis, Fred (2013). The Man From Mars: Ray Palmer's Amazing Pulp Journey. New York: Jeremy P. Tarcher/Penguin. ISBN 978-0-399-16054-7.
