= Minions of the Moon =

1939 novel by William Gray Beyer

- Dust-jacket from the first edition
- Author: William Gray Beyer
- Cover artist: Edd Cartier
- Language: English
- Genre: Science fiction
- Publisher: Gnome Press
- Publication date: 1950
- Publication place: United States
- Media type: Print (Hardback)
- Pages: 190
- OCLC: 1296689

Minions of the Moon is a science fiction novel by American writer William Gray Beyer, originally serialized in the magazine Argosy in 1939. It was published in book form in 1950 by Gnome Press in an edition of 5,000.

== Plot introduction ==
The novel is a space opera about a contemporary man who awakens in the far future.

== Reception ==
Boucher and McComas gave Minions a mixed review, describing it as "a conventional enough sleeper-wakes-into-retrograde-world story, but told with a fine blend of high romantic adventure and lively absurdity.". Damon Knight found the novel an "old-style romance, somewhat the worse for wear". P. Schuyler Miller declared that the author's treatment of "Omega, [the] puckish, hammish disembodied superintelligence, last survivor of the lunar race of whatsits," sets the novel apart from the routine.

== Sources ==
- Chalker, Jack L.; Mark Owings (1998). The Science-Fantasy Publishers: A Bibliographic History, 1923-1998. Westminster, MD and Baltimore: Mirage Press, Ltd. p. 299.
- Tuck, Donald H. (1974). The Encyclopedia of Science Fiction and Fantasy. Chicago: Advent. p. 43. ISBN 0-911682-20-1.

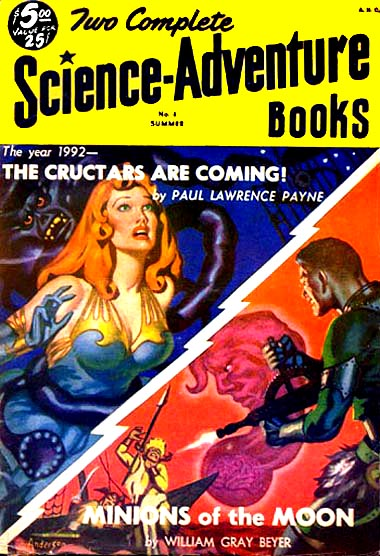
Minions of the Moon was reprinted in Two Complete Science-Adventure Books in 1952
