= Coming Attractions =

Coming Attractions may refer to:

- Coming Attractions (book), a 1957 anthology of science fiction essays edited by Martin Greenberg
- Coming Attractions (album), a 2000 album by Adrian Belew
- Previews of coming attractions or trailers
- "Coming Attractions", a song by the Vels from Velocity
- Coming Attractions, an alternative title for the 1978 film Loose Shoes

== See also ==
- "Coming Attraction", a 1950 science fiction short story by Fritz Leiber
