= The Starmen =

1952 novel by Leigh Brackett

- Dust-jacket from the first edition
- Author: Leigh Brackett
- Cover artist: Ric Binkley
- Language: English
- Genre: Science fiction
- Publisher: Gnome Press
- Publication date: 1952
- Publication place: United States
- Media type: Print (Hardcover)
- Pages: 247
- OCLC: 1722293

The Starmen is a science fiction novel by American writer Leigh Brackett. It was published in 1952 by Gnome Press in an edition of 5,000 copies. It was also published by Ballantine Books in 1976 under the original magazine title of The Starmen of Llyrdis. Ace Books published an abridged edition under the title The Galactic Breed. The Ace edition was published as an Ace Double with Conquest of the Space Sea by Robert Moore Williams. The novel was initially serialized in the magazine Startling Stories in 1951.

== Plot introduction ==
The novel is a space opera concerning the only race that is able to endure the rigors of interstellar travel.

== Reception ==
Contemporary reviews were mediocre to positive. In F&SF, Anthony Boucher and J. Francis McComas described The Starmen as "an able job of writing a completely routine and uncreative space opera." In Galaxy Magazine, Groff Conklin called the novel "a pleasurable way to pass a couple of hours" and noted that Brackett "writes well, moves her plot along at a suitable pace, and maneuvers her characters in a lifelike manner."

== Sources ==
- Chalker, Jack L.; Mark Owings (1998). The Science-Fantasy Publishers: A Bibliographic History, 1923-1998. Westminster, MD and Baltimore: Mirage Press, Ltd. p. 301.
- Corrick, James A. (1989). Double Your Pleasure: the ACE SF Double. Brooklyn, NY: Gryphon Books. pp. 18–19. ISBN 0-936071-21-4.
- Tuck, Donald H. (1974). The Encyclopedia of Science Fiction and Fantasy. Chicago: Advent. p. 61. ISBN 0-911682-20-1.
