= The Porcelain Magician =

1948 collection of short stories by Frank Owen

- Dust-jacket from the first edition
- Author: Frank Owen
- Illustrator: Frances E. Dunn
- Cover artist: Frances E. Dunn
- Language: English
- Genre: Fantasy
- Publisher: Gnome Press
- Publication date: 1948
- Publication place: United States
- Media type: Print (hardback)
- Pages: 256

The Porcelain Magician is a collection of oriental fantasy short stories by American writer Frank Owen. It was first published in hardcover by Gnome Press in 1948. The stories, except for "The Porcelain Magician" and "Monk's Blood", originally appeared in the magazines Weird Tales, Mystery Magazine and The Dance Magazine.

== Contents ==
- Foreword, by David A. Kyle
- "The Fan"
- "The Inverted House"
- "The Lantern Maker"
- "The Porcelain Magician"
- "The Purple Sea"
- "The Old Man Who Swept the Sky"
- "Doctor Shen Fu"
- "Pale Pink Porcelain"
- "The Rice Merchant"
- "The Blue City"
- "The Fountain"
- "Monk's Blood"
- "The Golden Hour of Kwoh Fan"
- "The Wind That Tramps the World"
