= Coming Attractions (book) =

1957 anthology edited by Martin Greenberg

- Dust-jacket from the first edition
- Author: edited by Martin Greenberg
- Cover artist: W.I. Van der Poel
- Language: English
- Subject: Science fiction essays
- Publisher: Gnome Press
- Publication date: 1957
- Publication place: United States
- Media type: Print (Hardback)
- Pages: 254 pp
- OCLC: 1144168

Coming Attractions is a 1957 anthology of science fiction essays edited by Martin Greenberg. Many of the articles originally appeared in the magazines Thrilling Wonder Stories, Astounding, Science Fiction Stories and Fantasy and Science Fiction.

== Contents ==
- Preface, by Martin Greenberg
- Introduction, by Dwight W. Batteau
- "A Letter to the Martians", by Willy Ley
- "How to Learn Martian", by Charles F. Hockett
- "Language for Time Travelers", by L. Sprague de Camp
- "Geography for Time Travelers", by Willy Ley
- "Time Travel and the Law", by C. M. Kornbluth
- "Space Fix", by R. S. Richardson
- "Space War", by Willy Ley
- "Space War Tactics", by Malcolm Jameson
- "Fuel for the Future", by Jack Hatche
- "How to Count on Your Fingers", by Frederik Pohl
- "Interplanetary Copyright", by Donald F. Reines
