= William Gray Beyer =

American novelist

- Occupations: Short story writer, novelist
- Writing career
- Period: 1939 to 1951
- Genres: Science fiction, Mystery

William Gray Beyer was an American writer of science fiction and mystery.

== Biography ==
William Gray Beyer worked his way through the Drexel Institute by selling radio receivers. He worked at many jobs including taxi driving, sales, railroading and police work. He joined the Philadelphia police force in approximately 1941 to gain authentic background for his detective stories. He was active as a writer from 1939 to 1951 and his stories appeared in the pulp magazines of that period including Argosy. His book, Minions of the Moon was published by Gnome Press in 1950.

== Works ==
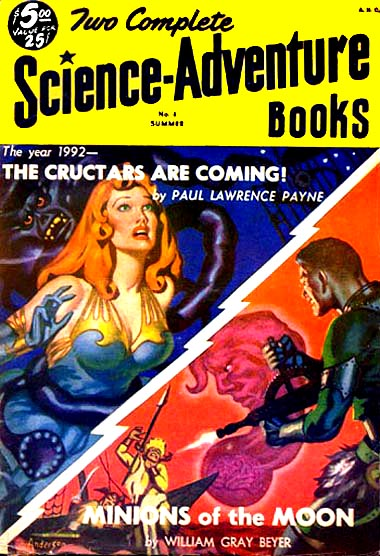
Beyer's Minions of the Moon was reprinted in Two Complete Science-Adventure Books in 1952

- Minions of the Moon (1939) [Mark Nevins Book 1]
- "Let 'Em Eat Space" (1939)
- Minions of Mars (1940) [Mark Nevins Book 2]
- Minions of Mercury (1940) [Mark Nevins Book 3]
- Minions of the Shadow (1941) [Mark Nevins Book 4]
- Eenie, Meenie, Minie — Murder! (1945)
- Murder Secretary (1945)
- Death of a Puppeteer (1946)
- Murder by Arrangement (1948)
- "The Deadly Thinkers" (1951)
- Minions of the Shadow : and the other Mark Nevin-Omega novels (omnibus, 2003)
