= H. Chandler Elliott =

American novelist

- Born: August 26, 1909; Toronto, Ontario, Canada
- Died: 1978 (aged 68–69)
- Occupations: Physician; short story writer; novelist
- Writing career
- Period: 1954 to 1969
- Genre: Science fiction

Harry Chandler Elliott (August 26, 1909-1978) was a naturalized American physician and writer of science fiction.

== Biography ==
Elliott was educated at the University of Toronto where he received a B.A. in 1930 and a M.A. in 1935. His speciality was neuroanatomy, which he taught at the University of Nebraska School of Medicine. His science fiction stories appeared in the magazines Galaxy Science Fiction, Beyond Fantasy Fiction and Astounding. His novel Reprieve from Paradise was published by Gnome Press in 1955.
