= The Cool War =

1981 novel by Frederik Pohl

- Cover of the first edition
- Author: Frederik Pohl
- Cover artist: Murray Tinkelman
- Subject: Environmental issues
- Genre: Science fiction
- Publisher: Del Rey Books
- Publication date: 1981
- ISBN: 0-394-29383-5

The Cool War is a science fiction novel by American writer Frederik Pohl, published in 1981 by Del Rey Books.

== Plot outline ==
Like many of Pohl's novels, this opens in a world reduced by a crisis, in this case the loss of fossil fuels. Solar power is a major, albeit insufficient, source of power. Electricity is metered and cut off if a home exceeds a maximum amount of usage. "Power piggery", the profligate use of electricity, is a crime.

The Rev. H. Hornswell "Horny" Hake becomes embroiled in "the Cool War", in which each country tries to sabotage the economies of its rivals, even if politically they are allies. For instance, he is put in charge of a party of schoolchildren touring Europe. The children are, however, carrying a virulent flu-like disease that affects only adults aged between 30 and 50, the "prime of life" individuals who tend to run businesses and government in industrialized countries. As a result, industrial production in Europe falls drastically. The group who created the infection is known only as "The Team" and is composed of former agents of the CIA and other organizations.

However the War has produced a group of people who profit by its continuation and can suppress technologies that might solve humanity's problems. In particular a new form of solar energy collection relies on bio-engineered "sunflowers" which, while technically plants, have extremely reflective petals and can be trained to focus light from a wide area on a furnace or power generator. The Team is determined to destroy the technology because it was invented outside the United States. Hake has to recruit his friends, and some of his enemies, to prevent this and expose the Team to the world.

== Reception ==
Kirkus characterized the book as having "a splendid opening followed up by predictable or implausible suspense formulas--an uneven frolic which Pohl fans will certainly find worth a try."
