= Everett B. Cole =

American writer

Everett Bush Cole
- Born: 1910-04-17; Jamestown, New York
- Died: 2001-08-21; Yorktown, Texas
- Occupations: Short story writer; novelist; professional soldier; teacher
- Writing career
- Period: 1951 to 1970
- Genre: Science fiction

Everett B. Cole (1910–2001) was an American writer of science fiction short stories and a professional soldier. He fought at Omaha Beach during World War II and worked as a signal maintenance and property officer at Fort Douglas, Utah, retiring in 1960. He got a bachelor's degree in Math and Physics and became a Math, Physics, and Chemistry teacher at Yorktown High School in Texas. His first science fiction story, "Philosophical Corps" was published in the magazine Astounding in 1951. His fix-up of that story and two others, The Philosophical Corps, was published by Gnome Press in 1962. A second novel, The Best Made Plans, was serialized in Astounding in 1959, but never published in book form. He also co-authored historical books about the south Texas region.
