= Stuart J. Byrne =

American screenwriter and writer

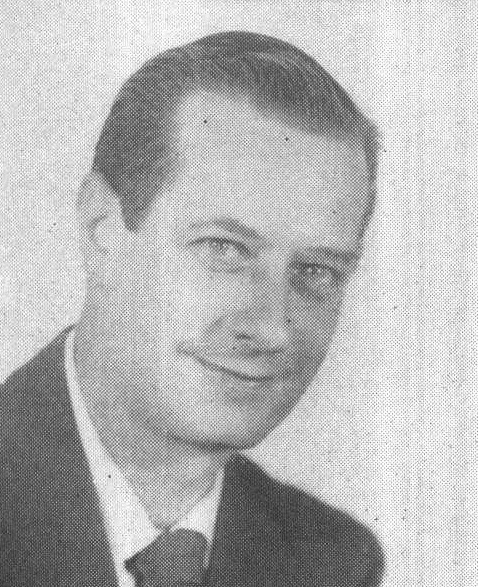
- Stuart J. Byrne c.1952
- Born: Stuart James Byrne; October 26, 1913; Saint Paul, Minnesota, U.S.
- Died: September 23, 2011; Ojai, California, U.S.
- Education: University of California, Los Angeles (MA)
- Occupations: Screenwriter and author
- Writing career
- Language: English

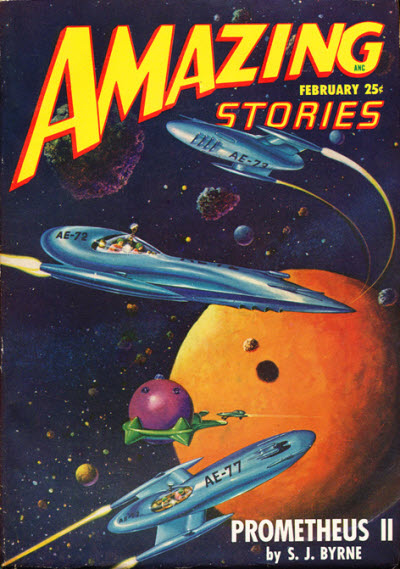
Byrne's novel Prometheus II was the cover story for the February 1948 issue of Amazing Stories. It would not be published in book form until 2012.

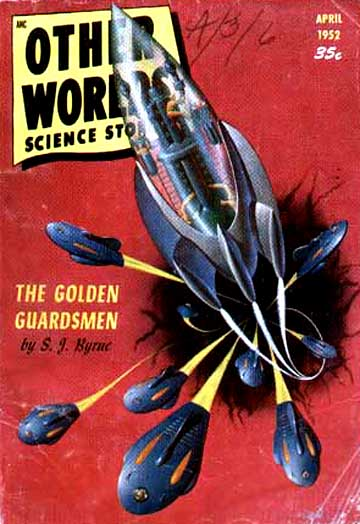
The first installment of Byrne's novel The Golden Guardsmen took the cover of the April 1952 issue of Other Worlds Science Stories. It would not be published in book form until 2013.

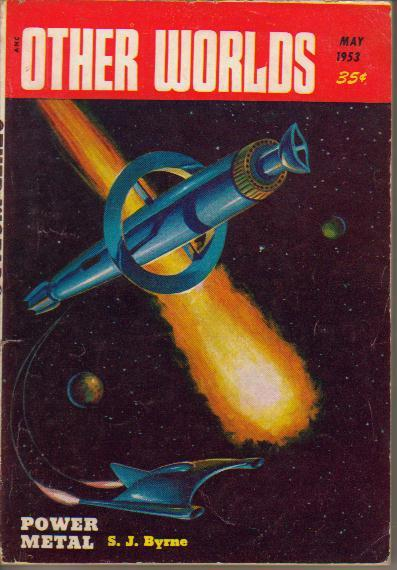
Byrne's novel Power Metal, serialized in Other Worlds in 1953, was published in book form in 2015.

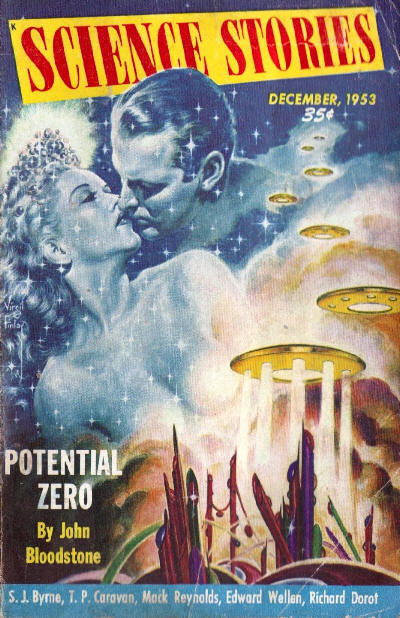
Byrne's novella Potential Zero, written under his "John Bloodstone" byline, was the cover story in the December 1953 issue of Science Stories

Stuart James Byrne (October 26, 1913 – September 23, 2011) was an American screenwriter and writer of science fiction and fantasy. He published under his own name and the pseudonyms Rothayne Amare, John Bloodstone, Howard Dare, and Marx Kaye (a house pseudonym).

== Biography ==
Byrne was born in Saint Paul, Minnesota. Later he recalled, "I was in there early enough to see magic lantern slides instead of movies, to watch the little man in the black suit climb his ladder to light our gas lamp out front, and in the early twenties I was excited by whisperings of a thing called radio!" Favorite fiction memories of the time included Grimm's Fairy Tales, Alice in Wonderland, L. Frank Baum's Oz stories, the Rover Boys, the Boy Allies, Gernsback science fiction, and "the life-changing impact of the Edgar Rice Burroughs books."

At the age of twelve, he moved with his family to California. In his teen years, his interest in science fiction continued. He also became an avid amateur astronomer. Years later, he recalled that "many a summer night ... were spent in awe ... in the Pleiades and the great Orion Nebula, or surfing the moons of Jupiter and rings of Saturn. In fact at fifteen I was grinding parabolic mirrors for my amateur telescope."

In the 1930s, he married Joey and fathered two children, Richard and Joanne; he now has three grandchildren and three great-grandchildren. He earned an M.A. at UCLA. He published his first science fiction story, entitled "Music of the Spheres" in Amazing Stories in 1935. It told how a young man sacrificed his life to send a passenger spaceship away from a fatal encounter with the sun. In their capsule review of the book, Bleiler and Bleiler state, "The story, which is purple in writing, now considers the sensations of the young man as he approaches death in the sun, fancying that he hears the music of the spheres."

In the 1940s and 1950s, Byrne published in Science Stories, Amazing Stories, Imagination, and Other Worlds.

Byrne's character, Michael Flanagan, appeared as the hero of three novels published in Amazing Stories: The Land Beyond the Lens, The Golden Gods, and The Return of Michael Flannigan, all listed as by John Bloodstone. The first two of these stories were collected as Godman (spelled "Godman!" on the cover) in 1970. All have been reprinted by Armchair Fiction as by S.J. Byrne. According to Byrne's later reminiscence, the name "John Bloodstone" was suggested by Ray Palmer to fool Howard Browne, the editor of Amazing Stories, who had requested that Palmer write a story about a picture showing a man going through some kind of lens. Palmer passed the job over to Byrne, but eventually confessed the switch to Browne.

=== Tarzan novel ===
In 1955, Byrne became known as the author of an unpublishable new Tarzan novel called Tarzan on Mars via an editorial called "Tarzan Never Dies", by editor Ray Palmer, in Other Worlds Science Stories magazine. The novel could not be published because Palmer was unable to get authorization from the estate of Edgar Rice Burroughs.

=== Men into Space ===
As a screenwriter, Byrne wrote for the Men into Space TV show in 1959 and 1960. He is credited with writing the episode entitled "Quarantine" (1959) and providing the story for the one entitled "Contraband" (1960). He received credit for the story of the 1971 film called The Deserter as well as the original story and screenplay for the 1972 film The Doomsday Machine. According to Bleiler and Bleiler, he was also a screenwriter for the 1975 film Journey into Fear, although he is not so credited in the IMdb online database.

=== Thundar ===
Byrne reverted to the Bloodstone pseudonym for the publication of his original paperback novel Thundar, about the adventures of Michael Storm, also known as Thundar, on the Earth in the far future. After a framing device concerning Michael Storm's diaries, the story begins with Storm's adventures in the Peruvian mountains searching for the legendary time-gate of Viricocha. According to Byrne, "The scenes and locale of the opening adventure in the Peruvian Andes are authenticated by the fact that I spent some years in those mouintains, following the trails of Pizarro while guided by archaic Spanish manuscript". Byrne also declared: "An ERB attorney once suggested to me that I try writing my own ERB-style fantasy adventures using my own characters. The result was Thundar - Man of Two Worlds, written also in the ERB classical fantasy style, under my fantasy pen name, John Bloodstone."

=== Perry Rhodan ===
In the 1970s, Byrne also worked as a translator on the Perry Rhodan series from German to English. He is credited as co-author with Clark Dalton of the two-part story called "Test Flight to Eden" (1975), which appeared in two consecutive Perry Rhodan books. When there were financial problems publishing Perry Rhodan books due to a change in the exchange rate between German and US currencies, Byrne undertook to write the Star Man series, of which 11 appeared in print, published by Forrest J. Ackerman's Master Publications. The first story was the Supermen of Alpha.

=== Gothic ===
Also in the 1970s, Byrne tried his hand at Gothic writing from the first-person female point of view. The result was The Visitation, originally published in 1977, and republished as Hoaxbreaker in 2003.

=== e-Books ===
Since 1998, many of Byrne's stories have been published in electronic form. They are all listed as by "Stuart J. Byrne", with "writing as John Bloodstone" and his other bynames.

== Published work ==
=== Short stories ===
- Music of the Spheres, Amazing Stories, August, 1935
- Beyond the Darkness, Other Worlds, July 1951
- Matter of Perspective, Other Worlds, October 1951
- Gsrthnxrpqrpf, Other Worlds, March 1952
- The Ultimate Death (by Howard Dare), Other Worlds, July 1952
- Lady of Flame (reprint of The Naked Goddess), Authentic Science Fiction Monthly, #30, February 1953
- Children of the Chronotron, Imagination, December 1952
- The Bridge, Science Stories, December 1953
- Beware the Star Gods, Imagination, June 1954
- The Metamorphs, Other Worlds, January 1957
- Spaceship Named Desire, Other Worlds, July 1957
- Test Flight to Eden (Part 1 of 2), by Stuart J. Byrne and Clark Darlton, in Perry Rhodan #68: Stars of Druufon, 1975
- Test Flight to Eden (Part 2 of 2), by Clark Darlton and Stuart J. Byrne, in Perry Rhodan #69: The Bonds of Eternity, April 1975
- Star Man 1: Supermen of Alpha, Perry Rhodan #137: The Phantom Horde / Star Man 1–5, Master Publications, 1979
- Star Man 2: Time Window, Perry Rhodan #137: The Phantom Horde / Star Man 1–5, Master Publications, 1979
- Star Man 3: Interstellar Mutineers, Perry Rhodan #137: The Phantom Horde / Star Man 1–5, Master Publications, 1979
- Star Man 4: The Cosmium Raiders, Perry Rhodan #137: The Phantom Horde / Star Man 1–5, Master Publications, 1979
- Star Man 5: The World Changer, Perry Rhodan #137: The Phantom Horde / Star Man 1–5, Master Publications, 1979
- Star Man 6: Slaves of Venus, Star Man 6–11, Master Publications, 1980
- Star Man 7: Lost in the Milky Way, Star Man 6–11, Master Publications, 1980
- Star Man 8: Time Trap, Star Man 6–11, Master Publications, 1980
- Star Man 9: The Centurian, Star Man 6–11, Master Publications, 1980
- Star Man 10: The Emperor, Star Man 6–11, Master Publications, 1980
- Star Man 11: The Return of Star Man, Star Man 6–11, Master Publications, 1980
- Star Man 12: The Second Empire, ebook only
- Star Man 13: The Summit Conference, ebook only

=== Novels ===
- Starman (1969), Powell Sci-Fi, PP 165, Powell Publications, Reseda, CA.
- Godman (1970) (writing as John Bloodstone), Powell Sci-Fi, PP 205, Powell Publications, Reseda, CA (front cover gives title as "Godman!").
- Thundar (1971) (writing as John Bloodstone), Leisure Books, North Hollywood, CA (front cover gives title as "Thundar: Man of Two Worlds", spine says "Thundar!", and title page says "Thundar").
- The Alpha Trap (1976), Major Books, Canoga Park, CA.
- The Visitation (1977) (writing as Rothayne Amare), Major Books, Canoga Park, CA.
- Star Quest (2006), Trafford Publishing, Victoria, BC, Canada.
- Last Days of Thronas (by John Bloodstone), Science Stories, February 1954; Armchair Fiction
- The Naked Goddess, Other Worlds, October, 1952, Armchair Fiction #D-192, 2017
- Potential Zero (by John Bloodstone), Science Stories, December 1953, Armchair Fiction #D-113, 2014
- Land Beyond the Lens (by John Bloodstone), Amazing Stories, March 1952, Michael Flannigan #1, Armchair Fiction #D-124, 2014
- The Golden Gods (by John Bloodstone), Amazing Stories May 1952, Michael Flannigan #2, Armchair Fiction #D-159, 2015
- Return of Michael Flannigan (by John Bloodstone), Amazing Stories August 1952, Michael Flannigan #3, Armchair Fiction #D-159, 2015
- Prometheus II, Amazing Stories, February, 1948, Armchair Fiction, #C-27, 2012
- The Golden Guardsmen, Other Worlds, April, June, and July, 1952 (sequel to Prometheus II), Armchair Fiction, #C-31, 2012
- Power Metal, Other Worlds, May, June, and July, 1953, Armchair Fiction #C-66, 2015
- Colossus, (reprint of Colossus I) Other Worlds, May 1950, Armchair Fiction #D-227, 2018
- Colossus Conclusion, (reprint of Colossus II, Other Worlds, July 1950 and Colossus III, Other Worlds, September, 1950), Armchair Fiction #D-246, 2019

== Sources ==
- Bleiler, Everett F. with Richard J. Bleiler. Science-Fiction: The Gernsback Years. Kent, OH: Kent State University Press, 1998. ISBN 0-87338-604-3.
