= The Philosophical Corps =

1962 novel by Everett B. Cole

- Dust-jacket from the first edition
- Author: Everett B. Cole
- Cover artist: W.I. Van der Poel
- Language: English
- Genre: Science fiction
- Publisher: Gnome Press
- Publication date: 1962
- Publication place: United States
- Media type: Print (Hardback)
- Pages: 187
- OCLC: 5068218

The Philosophical Corps is science fiction novel by American writer Everett B. Cole. It was published in 1962 by Gnome Press in an edition of 4,000 copies. The novel is a fix-up of stories that originally appeared in the magazine Astounding SF.

== Plot summary ==
The novel concerns the adventures of the philosopher Commander A-Riman who attempts to re-educate aliens from whom he brooks no nonsense.

== Contents ==
- "Fighting Philosopher"
- "Philosophical Corps"
- "The Players"

== Sources ==
- Chalker, Jack L.; Mark Owings (1998). The Science-Fantasy Publishers: A Bibliographic History, 1923-1998. Westminster, MD and Baltimore: Mirage Press, Ltd. p. 309.
- Clute, John; Peter Nicholls (1995). The Encyclopedia of Science Fiction. New York: St. Martin's Griffin. p. 242. ISBN 0-312-13486-X.
- Contento, William G. "Index to Science Fiction Anthologies and Collections".
- Tuck, Donald H. (1974). The Encyclopedia of Science Fiction and Fantasy. Chicago: Advent. p. 107. ISBN 0-911682-20-1.
