= Reprieve from Paradise =

1955 novel by H. Chandler Elliott

- Dust-jacket from the first edition
- Author: H. Chandler Elliott
- Cover artist: Mel Hunter
- Language: English
- Genre: Science fiction
- Publisher: Gnome Press
- Publication date: 1955
- Publication place: United States
- Media type: Print (Hardback)
- Pages: 256
- OCLC: 4018479

Reprieve from Paradise is a science fiction novel by American writer H. Chandler Elliott. It was published in 1955 by Gnome Press in an edition of 4,000 copies.

== Plot introduction ==
The novel is set after an atomic war and the world is run by Polynesians. The hero discovers a plot to turn the earth on its axis in order to create an Antarctic utopia.
