= This Fortress World =

1955 novel by James Gunn

- Dust-jacket from the first edition
- Author: James E. Gunn
- Cover artist: Murray Tinkelman
- Language: English
- Genre: Science fiction
- Publisher: Gnome Press
- Publication date: 1955
- Publication place: United States
- Media type: Print (Hardcover)
- Pages: 216
- OCLC: 1277712

This Fortress World is a science fiction novel by American writer James E. Gunn. It was published in 1955 by Gnome Press in an edition of 4,000 copies.

== Plot summary ==
The novel concerns a man's fight against the power of a future church.

== Sources ==
- Chalker, Jack L.; Mark Owings (1998). The Science-Fantasy Publishers: A Bibliographic History, 1923-1998. Westminster, MD and Baltimore: Mirage Press, Ltd. p. 304.
- Tuck, Donald H. (1974). The Encyclopedia of Science Fiction and Fantasy. Chicago: Advent. pp. 195–196. ISBN 0-911682-20-1.
