= Earl Mayan =

American illustrator

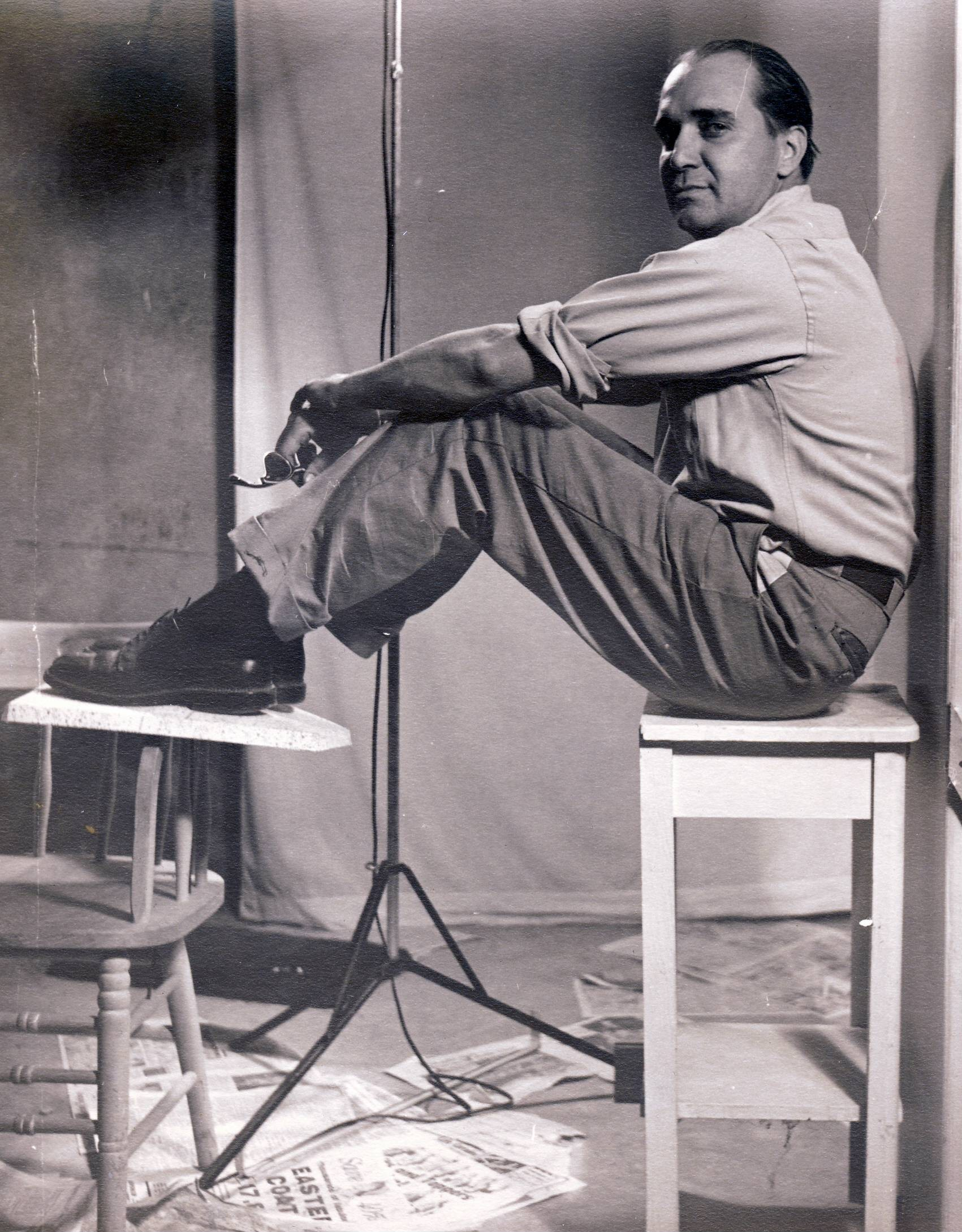
Earl Mayan in his studio

Earl Mayan (1916 – December 12, 2009) was an American illustrator whose early career spanned the era of pulp magazines to the post World War II years alongside Norman Rockwell at The Saturday Evening Post. From 1954 to 1961, he painted ten Saturday Evening Post covers and illustrated many of the stories that appeared as inside the magazine.

Chris Mullen, creator of the website The Visual Telling of Stories, wrote of Mayan's art, "He managed great visual invention, possessed excellent powers of drawing, and entertained his readers with an inventive set of references within the images."

== From Pratt to pulps ==
Mayan graduated from the Pratt Institute in Brooklyn, New York City in 1936. He majored in illustration alongside Edd Cartier. Upon graduation, one of Pratt's instructors, a Street & Smith art editor encouraged both graduates to enter the field of pulp illustration. Mayan illustrated The Shadow until he joined the army (1941–1945). After the war, his illustrations appeared often in "The Saturday Evening Post" and the "Reader's Digest Condensed Books".

Mayan also worked for Grosset & Dunlap, Argosy, Bantam Books and Random House. A portrait of César Chávez by Earl Mayan is in the National Portrait Gallery, Smithsonian Institution, Washington, D.C. From 1962 to 1995, Mayan taught drawing and illustration at the Art Student's League of New York.

Earl Mayan died in Huntington, Long Island, New York on December 12, 2009.
