= Surface Tension (short story) =

Science fiction short story by James Blish

- Short story by James Blish
- Country: United States
- Language: English
- Genre: Science fiction

Publication
- Published in: Galaxy Science Fiction
- Publication type: Magazine
- Media type: Print (Magazine)
- Publication date: August 1952

"Surface Tension" is a science fiction short story by American writer James Blish, originally published in the August 1952 of Galaxy Science Fiction. As collected in Blish's The Seedling Stars, it was revised to incorporate material from his earlier story "Sunken Universe", published in Super Science Stories in 1942.

== Plot summary ==
A human colonization ship crash-lands on a distant planet which is Earth-like but whose only landmass is completely covered in shallow puddles of water and mostly microscopic life forms. Normal humans could not survive on this planet, so the crew must genetically engineer their descendants into something that can survive. (Blish coined the term pantropy to refer to this concept.) They create a race of microscopic aquatic humanoids to complete their mission and colonize the planet.

The majority of the story concerns one group of these genetically engineered colonists and their intelligence, curiosity, and evolving technology. In particular, the tiny aquatic humanoids develop a "space ship", or rather "air ship", which enables them to pierce the previously impenetrable surface tension of the water and travel through what is, to them, hostile space—open air—to other worlds in other puddles of water.

== Reception ==
"Surface Tension" was among the stories selected in 1970 by the Science Fiction Writers of America as one of the best science fiction short stories published before the creation of the Nebula Awards. As such, it was published in The Science Fiction Hall of Fame Volume One, 1929–1964. It was adapted by George Lefferts as a radio drama for X Minus One in 1956. In this adaptation, the humanoids are part of an experiment running on a doomed Earth.

Anthony Boucher, commenting on the collected version of the story, noted that although Blish might seem "to pass the most remote bounds of scientific extrapolation, ... the details are worked out in magnificently convincing manner."

== See also ==
- Escape velocity, the barrier humans had to overcome to leave Earth
