= Starman's Quest =

1958 novel by Robert Silverberg

- Dust-jacket from the first edition
- Author: Robert Silverberg
- Cover artist: Stan Mack
- Language: English
- Genre: Science fiction
- Publisher: Gnome Press
- Publication date: 1958
- Publication place: United States
- Media type: Print (Hardback)
- Pages: 185
- OCLC: 317947

Starman's Quest is a science fiction novel by American writer Robert Silverberg. It was published in 1958 by Gnome Press in an edition of 5,000 copies, of which only 3,000 were bound. It was reprinted as a second edition in hardcover by Meredith Press in 1969.

== Plot summary ==
The story revolves around protagonist Alan Donnell, having just turned 17 and living on a space ship for all his life. While mankind has finally mastered interstellar travel, it is still bound to the speed of light using so-called Lexman drives. As a result, spacefarers experience the FitzGerald contraction, aging only a couple of weeks during their flights, where—depending on the actual distance traveled—years or even centuries pass by. This leads to the strange situation that Alan biologically is 17, but 300 in earth years.

Rumor has it that already in 2570, i.e. 1,300 years prior to the story time, the Cavour hyperdrive was invented by seclusive scientist James Hudson Cavour, who however vanished after his announcement that he finally achieved success.

As a result, spacefarers have become somewhat separated from Earth and their colonies, typically only stopping for loading, unloading and maintenance overhaul where they live in almost ghetto-like spacemen enclaves, and otherwise living in the segregated community of their ships.

For Alan, this setting feels increasingly constricted. Like his brother 8 years ago (experienced as just 6 weeks on the starship) on the last Earth stop, he leaves the starmen's enclave to explore earth. Being more lucky than his brother back then, he makes contact with a helpful wealthy gambler, Max Hawkes, who helps Alan find his brother and return him back to the ship.

This time, Alan stays on earth—and subsequently goes on a search for the Cavour hyperdrive.

Finally succeeding in retrieving crucial information and, also thanks to the wealth inherited from Max, building the Cavour hyperdrive, his maiden voyage takes him to his father's spaceship, reuniting with his brother almost 8 years later, now being twins of the same age again due to the effects of the Fitzgerald contraction.

== Reception ==
Galaxy reviewer Floyd C. Gale gave the novel a mixed review, rating it three stars out of five and finding that while "exciting story elements abound, [...] too many happenstances and line-of-least resistance writing steal too much of its effectiveness."

== Sources ==
- Chalker, Jack L.; Mark Owings (1998). The Science-Fantasy Publishers: A Bibliographic History, 1923-1998. Westminster, MD and Baltimore: Mirage Press, Ltd. p. 306.
- Tuck, Donald H. (1978). The Encyclopedia of Science Fiction and Fantasy. Chicago: Advent. p. 390. ISBN 0-911682-22-8.
