= The Bird of Time =

1959 science fiction novel

- Dust-jacket from the first edition
- Author: Wallace West
- Cover artist: W.I. Van der Poel, Jr.
- Language: English
- Genre: Science fiction
- Publisher: Gnome Press
- Publication date: 1959
- Publication place: United States
- Media type: Print (hardback)
- Pages: 191 pp
- OCLC: 1295293

The Bird of Time is a science fiction novel by American writer Wallace West. It was published in 1959 by Gnome Press in an edition of 5,000 copies, of which 2,102 were never bound. The novel is a fix-up of four of West's short stories that had originally appeared in the magazines Astounding and Thrilling Wonder Stories.

== Plot introduction ==
The novel concerns the adventures of the Martian bird-woman Yahna and Earthman Bill Newsome and the conflict between their worlds.

== Contents ==
- "En Route to Pluto"
- "The Lure of Polaris"
- "The Bird of Time"
- "Captive Audience"

== Reception ==
Galaxy reviewer Floyd C. Gale received the novel favorably, calling it "quick-paced and deftly written," but noted that the opening segment was clearly superior to the following parts.

== Sources ==
- Chalker, Jack L.; Mark Owings (1998). The Science-Fantasy Publishers: A Bibliographic History, 1923-1998. Westminster, MD and Baltimore: Mirage Press, Ltd. p. 307.
- Contento, William G. "Index to Science Fiction Anthologies and Collections".
- Tuck, Donald H. (1978). The Encyclopedia of Science Fiction and Fantasy. Chicago: Advent. p. 453. ISBN 0-911682-22-8.
