= The Seedling Stars =

1957 collection of science fiction short stories by James Blish

- Dust-jacket from the first edition
- Author: James Blish
- Cover artist: Lionel Dillon
- Language: English
- Genre: Science fiction
- Publisher: Gnome Press
- Publication date: 1957
- Publication place: United States
- Media type: Print (hardback)
- Pages: 185
- OCLC: 7013015

The Seedling Stars is a 1957 collection of science fiction short stories by American writer James Blish. It was first published by Gnome Press in 1957 in an edition of 5,000 copies. The stories concern the adaptation of humans to alien environments (a process Blish called pantropy).

== Contents ==
- "Seeding Program" (F&SF 1956) - Pantropy has been outlawed, implicitly because of lobbying by agencies who fear for their profits from regular colonisation programs. A modified human who was "rescued" by the authorities is sent to infiltrate a pantropy project on a world where regular humans cannot live, but upon finding out that he was lied to about the situation he switches sides and helps the project launch the rocket seeding adapted humans into space before the authorities can stop them.
- "The Thing in the Attic" (If 1954) - Monkey-like adapted humans banish a group of heretics from the treetops and sentence them to live on the ground. Adapting to this new and dangerous world, the outcasts eventually meet a spaceship and contact normal humans who are delighted to see how the adapted humans on this world have begun the process of moving down from the trees.
- "Surface Tension" (Galaxy 1952) - After a pantropy starship crashlands on a watery world with no hope of rescue, the crew improvise microscopic adapted humans and seed them into the world's puddles. Over the course of many seasons, the newcomers settle in, and upon realizing that they are not native to their environment, eventually build a wooden "spaceship" a few inches in length to overcome their puddle's surface tension and travel to "other worlds" - the next puddle.
- "Watershed" (If 1955) - In the far future, a starship crew of standard humans is at odds with the adapted colonists aboard. As racial tensions threaten to boil over, the leader of the colonists reveals that the forgotten planet they are going to re-colonize is none other Earth, where the original normal human form once formed, leaving the captain to contemplate whether the baseline human form might be outdated.

"Seeding Program" was originally published under the title "A Time to Survive". "Surface Tension" was revised from its magazine publication, and here incorporates material from Blish's earlier story "Sunken Universe", published in Super Science Stories in 1942. The four stories are termed 'Book One', 'Book Two', etc. and some editions refer to this as a standard novel in four sections, rather than an actual short story collection.

== Reception ==
Galaxy reviewer Floyd C. Gale praised the collection as "a thought-provoking job". Anthony Boucher also received the book favorably, saying it "nicely illustrat[ed] the characteristic Blish balance between thinking and storytelling, with each reinforcing the other".

== Sources ==
- Chalker, Jack L.; Mark Owings (1998). The Science-Fantasy Publishers: A Bibliographic History, 1923-1998. Westminster, MD and Baltimore: Mirage Press, Ltd. p. 306.
- Contento, William G. "Index to Science Fiction Anthologies and Collections".
