= The Complete Book of Outer Space =

1953 essay collection edited by Jeffrey Logan

- Dust-jacket from the first book publication
- Editor: Jeffrey Logan
- Illustrator: Frank R. Paul et al.
- Cover artist: Chesley Bonestell
- Language: English
- Subject: Space exploration
- Publisher: Gnome Press
- Publication date: 1953
- Publication place: United States
- Media type: Print (Hardback)
- Pages: 144
- OCLC: 6824625

The Complete Book of Outer Space is a 1953 collection of essays about space exploration edited by Jeffrey Logan. It first appeared as a magazine, published by Maco Magazine Corp. The first book publication was by Gnome Press in 1953 in an edition of 3,000 copies.

== Contents ==
- Preface, by Kenneth MacLeish
- "A Preview of the Future: Introduction", by Jeffrey Logan
- "Development of the Space Ship", by Willy Ley
- "Station in Space", by Wernher von Braun
- "Space Medicine", by Heinz Haber
- "Space Suits", by Donald H. Menzel
- "The High Altitude Program", by Robert P. Haviland
- "History of the Rocket Engine", by James H. Wyld
- "Legal Aspects of Space Travel", by Oscar Schachter
- "Exploitation of the Moon", by Hugo Gernsback
- "Life Beyond the Earth", by Willy Ley
- "Interstellar Flight", by Leslie R. Shepard
- "The Spaceship in Science Fiction", by Jeffrey Logan
- "Plea for a Coordinated Space Program", by Wernher von Braun
- "The Flying Saucer Myth", by Jeffrey Logan
- "The Panel of Experts"
- "Chart of the Moon Voyage"
- "Chart of the Voyage to Mars"
- "Timetables and Weights"
- "A Space Travel Dictionary"

== Reception ==
Groff Conklin of Galaxy Science Fiction said in 1954 that The Complete Book of Outer Space was "a fascinating collection" of pictures and text "of varying value ... but generally an exciting one".

== Sources ==
- Chalker, Jack L.; Mark Owings (1998). The Science-Fantasy Publishers: A Bibliographic History, 1923-1998. Westminster, MD and Baltimore: Mirage Press, Ltd. p. 299.
