= Space Lawyer =

1953 novel by Nat Schachner

- Dust-jacket from the first edition
- Author: Nat Schachner
- Cover artist: Ric Binkley
- Language: English
- Genre: Science fiction
- Publisher: Gnome Press
- Publication date: 1953
- Publication place: United States
- Media type: Print (hardback)
- Pages: 222
- OCLC: 1803979

Space Lawyer is a science fiction novel by American writer Nat Schachner. It was released in 1953 by Gnome Press in an edition of 4,000 copies. The novel is a fix-up from two short stories, "Old Fireball" and "Jurisdiction", both of which had originally appeared in the magazine Astounding.

== Sources ==
- Chalker, Jack L.; Mark Owings (1998). The Science-Fantasy Publishers: A Bibliographic History, 1923-1998. Westminster, MD and Baltimore: Mirage Press, Ltd. p. 301.
- Contento, William G. "Index to Science Fiction Anthologies and Collections".
