= 15th World Science Fiction Convention =

15th Worldcon (1957)

Loncon I, the 15th World Science Fiction Convention
- Genre: Science fiction
- Dates: 6–9 September 1957
- Venue: King's Court Hotel
- Location: London
- Country: United Kingdom
- Attendance: 268

The 15th World Science Fiction Convention (Worldcon), also known as Loncon I, was held on 6–9 September 1957 at the King's Court Hotel in London, United Kingdom. It was the first Worldcon held outside North America.

The chairman was Ted Carnell.

== Participants ==
Attendance was 268.

=== Guests of Honour ===
- John W. Campbell, Jr.

== Programming and events ==
Events included a "fancy dress ball" on the evening of Friday, 6 September.

== Awards ==
The World Science Fiction Society administers and presents the Hugo Awards, the oldest and most noteworthy award for science fiction. Selection of the recipients is by vote of the Worldcon members. Categories include novels and short fiction, artwork, dramatic presentations, and various professional and fandom activities.

Other awards may be presented at Worldcon at the discretion of the individual convention committee. This has often included the national SF awards of the host country, such as the Japanese Seiun Awards as part of Nippon 2007, and the Prix Aurora Awards as part of Anticipation in 2009. The Astounding Award for Best New Writer and the Sidewise Award, though not sponsored by the Worldcon, are usually presented, as well as the Chesley Awards, the Prometheus Award, and others. In 2021, the Nommo Awards began presenting at Worldcon.

=== 1957 Hugo Awards ===
The winners were:

- Best American Professional Magazine: Astounding Science Fiction, edited by John W. Campbell, Jr.
- Best British Professional Magazine: New Worlds, edited by John Carnell
- Best Fanzine: Science Fiction Times, edited by James V. Taurasi, Sr., Ray Van Houten, and Frank R. Prieto, Jr.

Because the 1957 International Fantasy Award was being given out in London at the same time, Loncon I chose not to compete with this similar literary award, which was given to J.R.R. Tolkien's The Lord of the Rings. As a result, only the three Hugo Awards for Best Professional Magazine and Best Fanzine were given out at the 1957 Worldcon. Both the International Fantasy Award and the Hugo Award shared the very same Chesley Bonestell-influenced finned rocketship design that year, the only time this has happened.

== See also ==
- Hugo Award
- Science fiction
- Speculative fiction
- World Science Fiction Society
- Worldcon

Preceded by 14th World Science Fiction Convention; NYCon II in New York City, United States (1956)	List of Worldcons; 15th World Science Fiction Convention; Loncon I in London, UK (1957)	Succeeded by 16th World Science Fiction Convention; Solacon in Los Angeles, California, United States (1958)
