= Frank Owen (author) =

American novelist (1893–1968)

- Born: 1893
- Died: October 13, 1968 (aged 74–75)
- Occupations: Author; novelist; anthologist
- Writing career
- Pen name: Roswell Williams

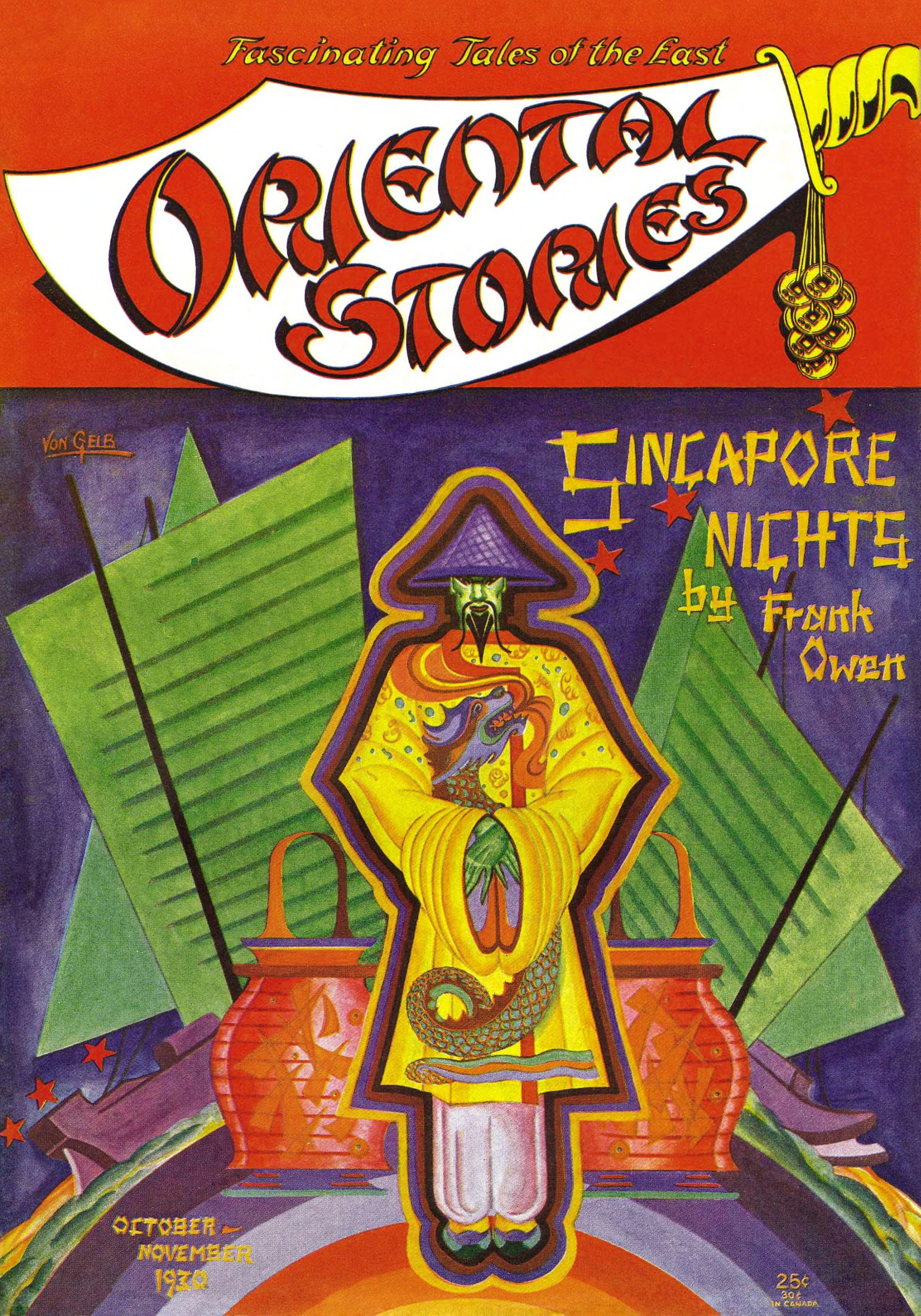
Owen's "Singapore Nights" was the cover story on the debut issue of Oriental Stories in 1930

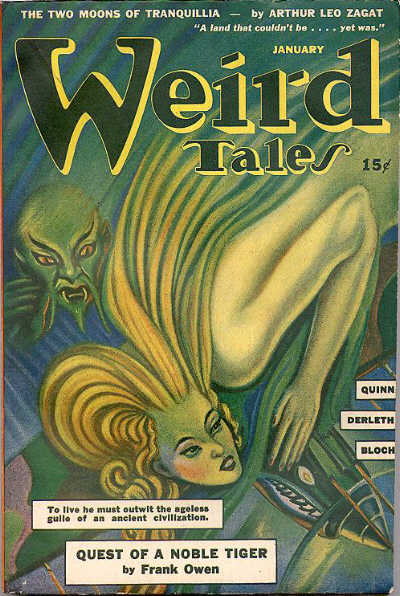
Owen's "Quest of a Noble Tiger" was the cover story in the January 1943 Weird Tales

Frank Owen (1893 – October 13, 1968) was an American author, novelist and anthologist. He wrote 10 novels in the 1930s under the pseudonym Roswell Williams, a name which is sometimes erroneously listed as his real name. Owen is best known for his oriental fantasy short stories, many of which appeared in the magazine Weird Tales. Owen also co-wrote several children's collections with his wife, Ethel Owen.

== Bibliography ==
=== Novels and collections ===
- Coat Tales from the Pockets of the Happy Giant (with Ethel Owen, collection, 1927)
- The Dream Hills of Happy Country (with Ethel Owen, collection, 1928)
- House Mother (1929)
- Pale Pink Porcelain (1929)
- The Wind that Tramps the World (1929)
- The Purple Sea (collection, 1930)
- Windblown Stories (with Ethel Owen, collection, 1930)
- The Professional Virgin (as Roswell Williams, 1931)
- Della Wu, Chinese Courtesan (collection, 1931)
- Rare Earth (1931)
- The Blue Highway (with Ethel Owen, collection, 1932)
- "Vagabond Lady" (as Roswell Williams, 1934)
- Madonna of the Damned (as Roswell Williams, 1935)
- Lovers of La Fab (as Roswell Williams, 1935)
- Dark Destiny (as Roswell Williams, 1936)
- A Husband for Kutani (collection, 1938)
- The Scarlet Hill (1941)
- The Porcelain Magician (1948)

=== Anthologies ===
- Murder for Millions (1946)
- Fireside Mystery Book (1947)
- Teen-age Mystery Stories (1948)
