= Wallace West =

American writer (1900–1980)

- Born: May 22, 1900
- Died: March 8, 1980 (aged 79)
- Occupation: Author
- Writing career
- Genre: Science fiction
- Notable work: The Bird of Time (1959)

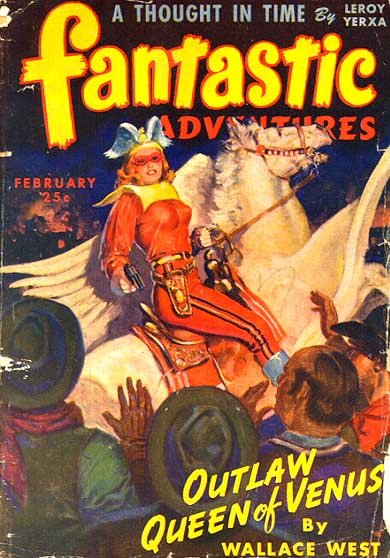
West's novelette "Outlaw Queen of Venus" was the cover story for the February 1944 issue of Fantastic Adventures

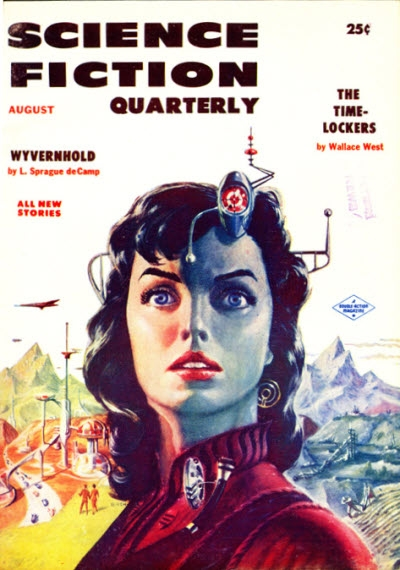
West's novelette "The Time-Lockers" was the cover story for the August 1956 issue of Science Fiction Quarterly

Wallace West (May 22, 1900 – March 8, 1980) was an American science fiction writer.

== Biography ==
West was born May 22, 1900.

He began publishing during the 1920s. His story "Static" appeared in Sea Stories Magazine in 1926 and the story "Loup-Garou" in Weird Tales in 1927. The majority of West's work, which was published prior to the 1960s, was short fiction. His few novels, mostly published after World War II, were mostly re-workings of his pre-war short fiction.

He is credited with suggesting the plot to the Arch Oboler radio play Profits Unlimited.

== Bibliography ==
=== Film history ===
- Alice in Wonderland (1934)
- Betty Boop in Snow-White (1934)
- Paramount Newsreel Men with Admiral Byrd in Little America (1934)

=== Novels ===
- The Bird of Time (1959)
- Lords of Atlantis (1960)
- The Memory Bank (1962)
- River of Time (1963)
- The Time-Lockers (1964)
- The Everlasting Exiles (1967)

=== Short stories ===
- "The Last Filibuster" (1967)
