= Murray Tinkelman =

American illustrator (1933–2016)

- Born: April 2, 1933; New York City, US
- Died: January 30, 2016 (aged 82); Westchester, New York, US
- Education: Cooper Union, Brooklyn Museum Art School
- Known for: Illustration
- Awards: Society of Illustrators Gold Medals
- Website: www.tinkelmanstudio.com

Murray Tinkelman (April 2, 1933 – January 30, 2016) was an American science-fiction and fantasy illustrator. He won gold medals from the Society of Illustrators. He provided numerous book covers for paperback reprints of science fiction and fantasy novels for Ballantine Books in the 1970s, including the reprints of many of John Brunner's novels.

== Biography ==
In 1970, the Graphic Arts Guild named him Artist of the Year. An avid baseball fan, Tinkelman’s work was presented in a rare solo exhibition in 1994 at The National Baseball Hall of Fame and Museum in Cooperstown, New York. The following year, Tinkelman was named “Sports Artist of the Year” by the United States Sports Academy in Daphne, Alabama, and was the focus of an exhibition. In 1999, he received a Distinguished Educator in the Arts award from the Society of Illustrators and in 2001 received a Faculty Service Citation from Syracuse University, where he would later become Professor Emeritus and a senior advisor.

Most recently, Tinkelman taught at the Hartford Art School which is a part of University of Hartford. Currently his collections can be found in Brooklyn Museum, the Delaware Art Museum, the International Photography Hall of Fame and Museum, and the New Britain Museum of American Art. He was awarded by the New York Art Directors Club and by Society of Publications Designers with gold medals.

On January 30, 2016, Murray Tinkelman (1933-2016) died at the age of 82. His wife and frequent artistic partner Carol preceded him in death just 15 days earlier, on January 15.

== Publications ==
Tinkelman's works appeared in such newspapers as Atlantic Monthly, The New York Times, and The Washington Post.

He illustrated William Saroyan's poem "Me" for its publication in The Saturday Evening Post on March 9, 1963. The poem and its illustrations were published as a children's book the same year, and republished in 2016.

== Book covers ==
- The Cool War
- This Fortress World
