= 14th World Science Fiction Convention =

14th Worldcon (1956)

NyCon II, the 14th World Science Fiction Convention
- Genre: Science fiction
- Dates: 31 August–3 September 1956
- Venue: Biltmore Hotel
- Location: New York City
- Country: United States
- Attendance: ~850
- Filing status: non-profit

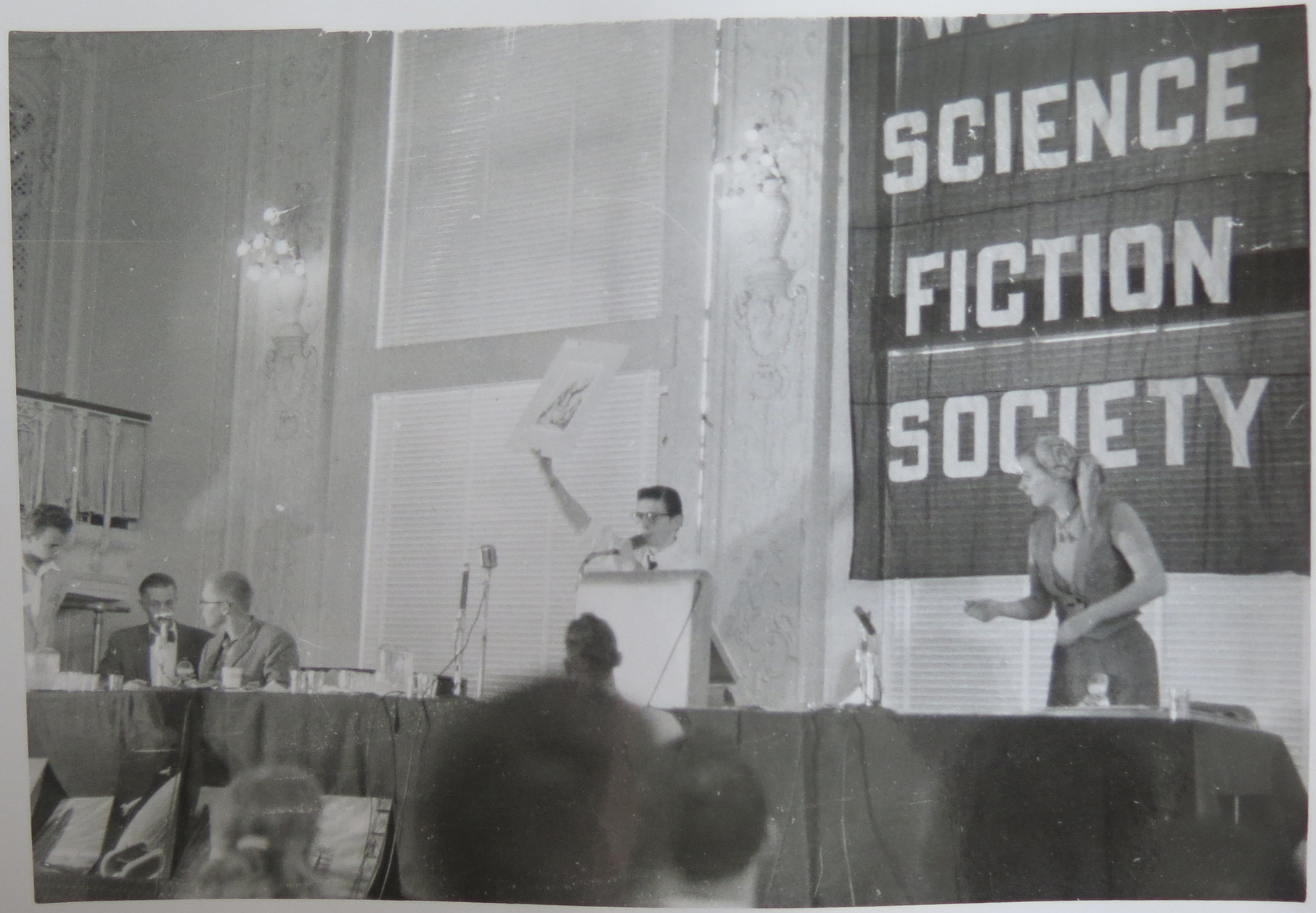
Snapshot from the 14th World Science Fiction Convention

The 14th World Science Fiction Convention (Worldcon), also known as NyCon II or NEWYORCON, was held on 31 August–3 September 1956 at the Biltmore Hotel in New York City, New York.

The chairman was David A. Kyle.

== Participants ==
Attendance was approximately 850.

=== Guests of honor ===
- Arthur C. Clarke
- Robert Bloch (toastmaster)

== Awards ==
The World Science Fiction Society administers and presents the Hugo Awards, the oldest and most noteworthy award for science fiction. Selection of the recipients is by vote of the Worldcon members. Categories include novels and short fiction, artwork, dramatic presentations, and various professional and fandom activities.

Other awards may be presented at Worldcon at the discretion of the individual convention committee. This has often included the national SF awards of the host country, such as the Japanese Seiun Awards as part of Nippon 2007, and the Prix Aurora Awards as part of Anticipation in 2009. The Astounding Award for Best New Writer and the Sidewise Award, though not sponsored by the Worldcon, are usually presented, as well as the Chesley Awards, the Prometheus Award, and others. In 2021, the Nommo Awards began presenting at Worldcon.

=== 1956 Hugo Awards ===
- Best Novel: Double Star, by Robert A. Heinlein
- Best Novelette: "Exploration Team", by Murray Leinster
- Best Short Story: "The Star", by Arthur C. Clarke
- Best Professional Artist: Frank Kelly Freas
- Best Professional Magazine: Astounding
- Best Fanzine: (tie)
  - Inside, edited by Ron Smith
  - Science Fiction Advertiser, edited by Ron Smith
- Best Feature Writer: Willy Ley
- Best Book Reviewer: Damon Knight
- Most Promising New Author: Robert Silverberg

== Future site selection ==
The primary bid for the 15th World Science Fiction Convention was for London. This would be the first Worldcon outside North America, and there was a small but vocal jingoistic faction of Americans who argued for retaining the Worldcon in North America, claiming "If we let them have it they'll never give it back". Their campaign against the London proposal was opposed by other Americans, most audibly Anthony Boucher, and the London bid won by an ample margin, to loud cheers. There were reportedly petty efforts even after the vote was over to sabotage the London bid, but they failed to hinder it.

== Notes ==
It was at this Worldcon that a group of fans (including Bob Tucker, Boyd Raeburn, Dick Eney, Ron Ellik, and Ted White) who had not paid the $7 fee for the convention banquet chose to sit in the balcony and listen to the Guest of Honor speeches. Convention chair Kyle had a messenger tell the "Balcony Insurgents" that Kyle had said they could not sit there. Since almost every fan who wrote about the convention reported the incident, "Dave Kyle Says You Can't Sit Here" became a fannish catchphrase.

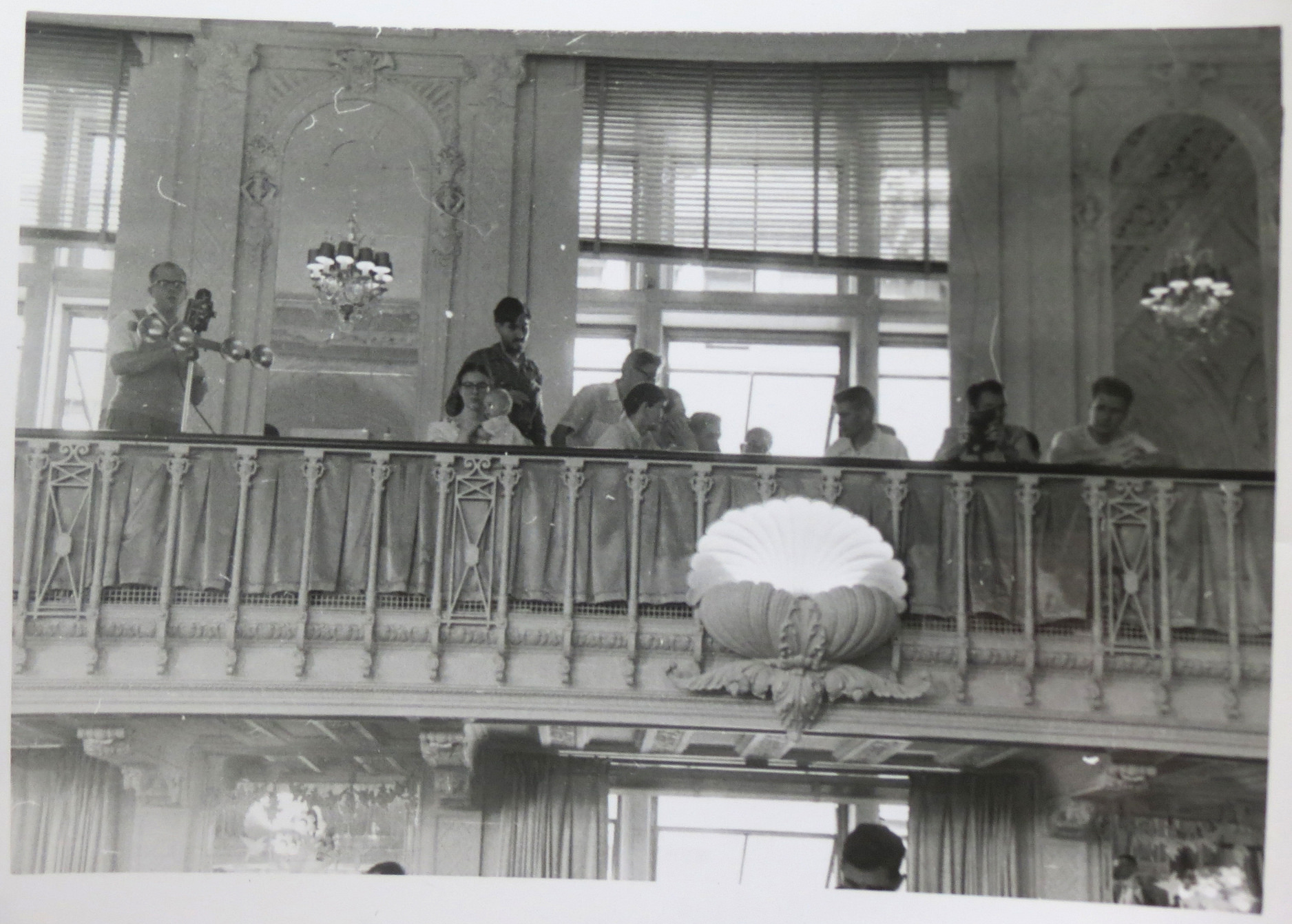
("Balcony Insurgents") 14th World Science Fiction Convention, 1956.

== See also ==
- Hugo Award
- Science fiction
- Speculative fiction
- World Science Fiction Society
- Worldcon

Preceded by 13th World Science Fiction Convention; Clevention in Cleveland, Ohio, United States (1955)	List of Worldcons; 14th World Science Fiction Convention; NyCon II in New York City, United States (1956)	Succeeded by 15th World Science Fiction Convention; Loncon I in London, UK (1957)
