= Bea Mahaffey =

American science fiction fan and editor (1928–1987)

Beatrice Mahaffey
- Mahaffey at Noreascon One (1971 Worldcon)
- Born: 1928
- Died: 1987 (aged 58–59)
- Occupation: Science fiction editor
- Writing career
- Notable work: Other Worlds

Beatrice Mahaffey (1928–1987) was an American science fiction fan and editor. She met Raymond Palmer in 1949 at the World Science Fiction Convention in Cleveland, and was hired to assist him at Clark Publications, his publishing company.

== Career ==
Mahaffey worked on Other Worlds from May 1950; Palmer was incapacitated by an accident for a while shortly after she was hired, though he remained involved from his hospital bed.

She was listed as coeditor from November 1952 to July 1953 and from May 1955 to November 1955. She coedited both Science Stories and Universe Science Fiction with Palmer, along with the first four issues of Mystic Magazine, from November 1953 to May 1954.

Science fiction historians Mike Ashley and E.F. Casebeer both consider that she had a strong positive influence on the magazines, and was probably responsible for acquiring much of the better material Palmer published.

After Palmer closed his offices in Evanston, Illinois in 1955, Mahaffey continued to work on the magazine by mail from Cincinnati. In 1956, an unexpected tax bill forced Palmer to lay off Mahaffey, and he ran the magazine by himself from that point on.

== Reception ==
Mahaffey was very popular with male science fiction fandom in the 1950s; Fred Nadis, in his biography of Palmer, records that "fans flocked to the Clark Publishing offices to get a glimpse of her", and that fans "pined for her" and "reported Bea sightings".

== Sources ==
- Ashley, Mike (1985). "Other Worlds Science Stories". In Tymn, Marshall B.; Ashley, Mike (eds.). Science Fiction, Fantasy, and Weird Fiction Magazines. Westport, Connecticut: Greenwood Press. pp. 457–466. ISBN 0-313-21221-X.
- Ashley, Mike (2005). Transformations:The Story of the Science-Fiction Magazines from 1950 to 1970. Liverpool: Liverpool University Press. ISBN 0-85323-779-4.
- Casebeer, E.F. (1985). "Universe Science Fiction". In Tymn, Marshall B.; Ashley, Mike (eds.). Science Fiction, Fantasy, and Weird Fiction Magazines. Westport, Connecticut: Greenwood Press. pp. 692–694. ISBN 0-313-21221-X.
- Nadis, Fred (2013). The Man From Mars: Ray Palmer's Amazing Pulp Journey. New York: Jeremy P. Tarcher/Penguin. ISBN 978-0-399-16054-7.

]
