= Robert Moore Williams =

American novelist

- Born: June 19, 1907; Farmington, Missouri, United States
- Died: May 12, 1977 (aged 69); United States
- Education: Missouri School of Journalism
- Occupation: Writer
- Writing career
- Language: English
- Genre: Science fiction

Robert Moore Williams (June 19, 1907 – May 12, 1977) was an American writer, primarily of science fiction. Pseudonyms included John S Browning, H. H. Harmon, Russell Storm and E. K. Jarvis (a house name).

Williams was born in Farmington, Missouri. He graduated from the Missouri School of Journalism in 1931. His first published story was "Zero as a Limit", which appeared in Astounding Science Fiction in 1937, under the pseudonym of "Robert Moore". He was a prolific author throughout his career, his last novel appearing in 1972. His "Jongor" series was originally published in Fantastic Adventures in the 1940s and 1950s, and appeared in book form in 1970. By the 1960s he had published over 150 stories.

== Bibliography ==
=== Jongor series ===
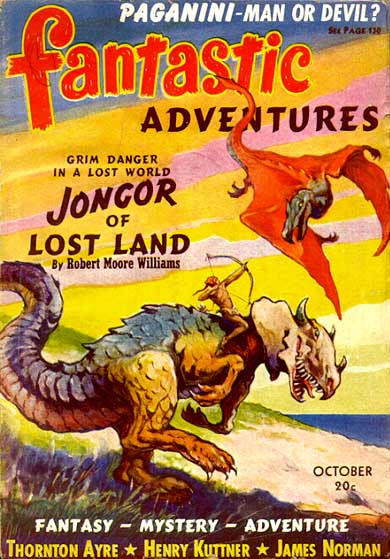
Jongor of Lost Land took the cover for the October 1940 issue of Fantastic Adventures, illustrated by J. Allen St. John

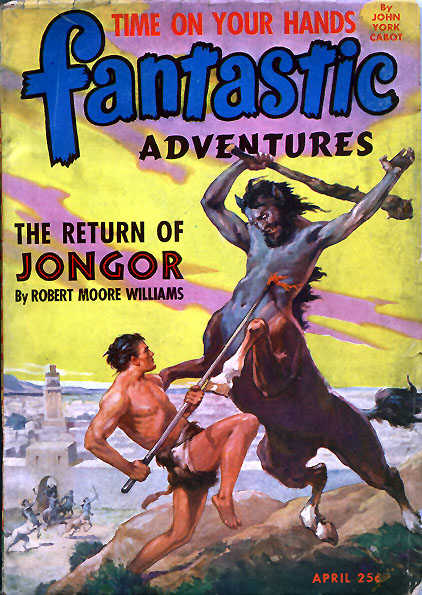
The Return of Jongor took the cover for the April 1944 issue of Fantastic Adventures, illustrated by J. Allen St. John

- Jongor of Lost Land (1940, repub. 1970)
- The Return of Jongor (1944, repub. 1970)
- Jongor Fights Back! (1951, repub. 1970 w/o exclamation point)

=== Zanthar series ===
- Zanthar of the Many Worlds (1967)
- Zanthar at Moon's Madness (1968)
- Zanthar at the Edge of Never (1968)
- Zanthar at Trip's End (1969)

=== Novels ===
- World Beyond the Sky (1943) book length novel published only in Startling Stories (January 1943)
- The Chaos Fighters (1955)
- Conquest of the Space Sea (1955) bound dos-à-dos with Leigh Brackett's The Galactic Breed
- Doomsday Eve (1957) bound dos-à-dos with Eric Frank Russell's Three to Conquer
- The Blue Atom (1958) bound dos-à-dos with The Void Beyond and Other Stories
- World of the Masterminds (1960)
- The Day They H-Bombed Los Angeles (1961)
- The Darkness Before Tomorrow (1962)
- King of the Fourth Planet (1962)
- Walk Up the Sky (1962)
- Flight from Yesterday (1963)
- The Star Wasps (1963) bound dos-à-dos with Terry Carr's Warlord of Kor
- The Lunar Eye (1964)
- The Second Atlantis (1965), Ace Books F-335 original paperback
- Vigilante 21st Century (1967)
- The Bell From Infinity (1968)
- When Two Worlds Meet (1970)
- Beachhead Planet (1970)
- Now Comes Tomorrow (1971)
- Seven Tickets to Hell (1972)
- Golden Blood, Lancer

=== Short story collections ===
- The Void Beyond and Other Stories (1958)
- To The End of Time and Other Stories (1960)
- When Two Worlds Meet: Stories of Men on Mars (1970)
- Sinister Paradise and Other Tales from the Pulps (2010)
- Time Tolls for Toro and Other Tales (2014)

=== Selected Short Stories ===
- "Missing: Millions in Radium" (Amazing Stories Dec 1939)
- “The Bridge to Earth” (1939)
- “Planet of the Gods” (1942)
- “The Lost Warship” (1943)
- “The Bees of Death” (1949)
- “Beyond the Rings of Saturn” (1951)
- “Sinister Paradise” (1952)
- “Thompson's Cat” (1952)
- “The Next Time We Die” (1957)

=== Non-fiction ===
- Love Is Forever - We Are For Tonight (1970) Called a novel on the cover, but really an autobiography

== See also ==
- List of novelists from the United States
