= David Kyle =

American science fiction writer and fan

David A. Kyle
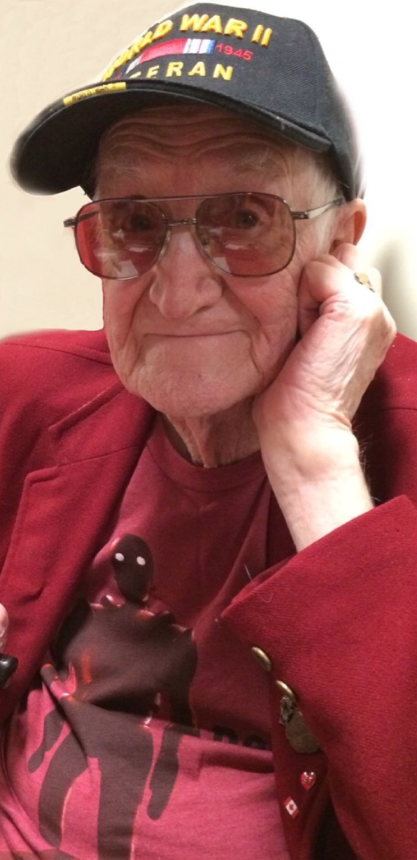
- Kyle in 2015
- Born: 14 February 1919; Middletown, Orange County, New York
- Died: 18 September 2016 (aged 97); Westchester County, NY
- Education: Columbia University
- Occupations: Writer, publisher
- Spouse: Ruth Landis (m. 1957; died 2011)
- Writing career
- Period: 1936–2016
- Genre: Science fiction

David A. Kyle (February 14, 1919 – September 18, 2016) was an American science fiction writer and member of science fiction fandom.

== Professional career ==
Kyle served as a reporter in the Air Force Reserves with the rank of lieutenant colonel, writing civil defense material, while working at radio station WPDM in Potsdam, New York.

With Martin Greenberg, Kyle founded Gnome Press in 1948. He wrote two pictorial histories of science fiction (A Pictorial History of Science Fiction and The Illustrated Book of Science Fiction Ideas and Dreams) and three licensed novels set in the Lensman universe (The Dragon Lensman, Lensman from Rigel and Z-Lensman).

He appeared with Paul Levinson, Greg Bear and many others on the History Channel's 2002 documentary, Fantastic Voyage: Evolution of Science Fiction. He died at the age of 97 on September 18, 2016.

== Fandom ==
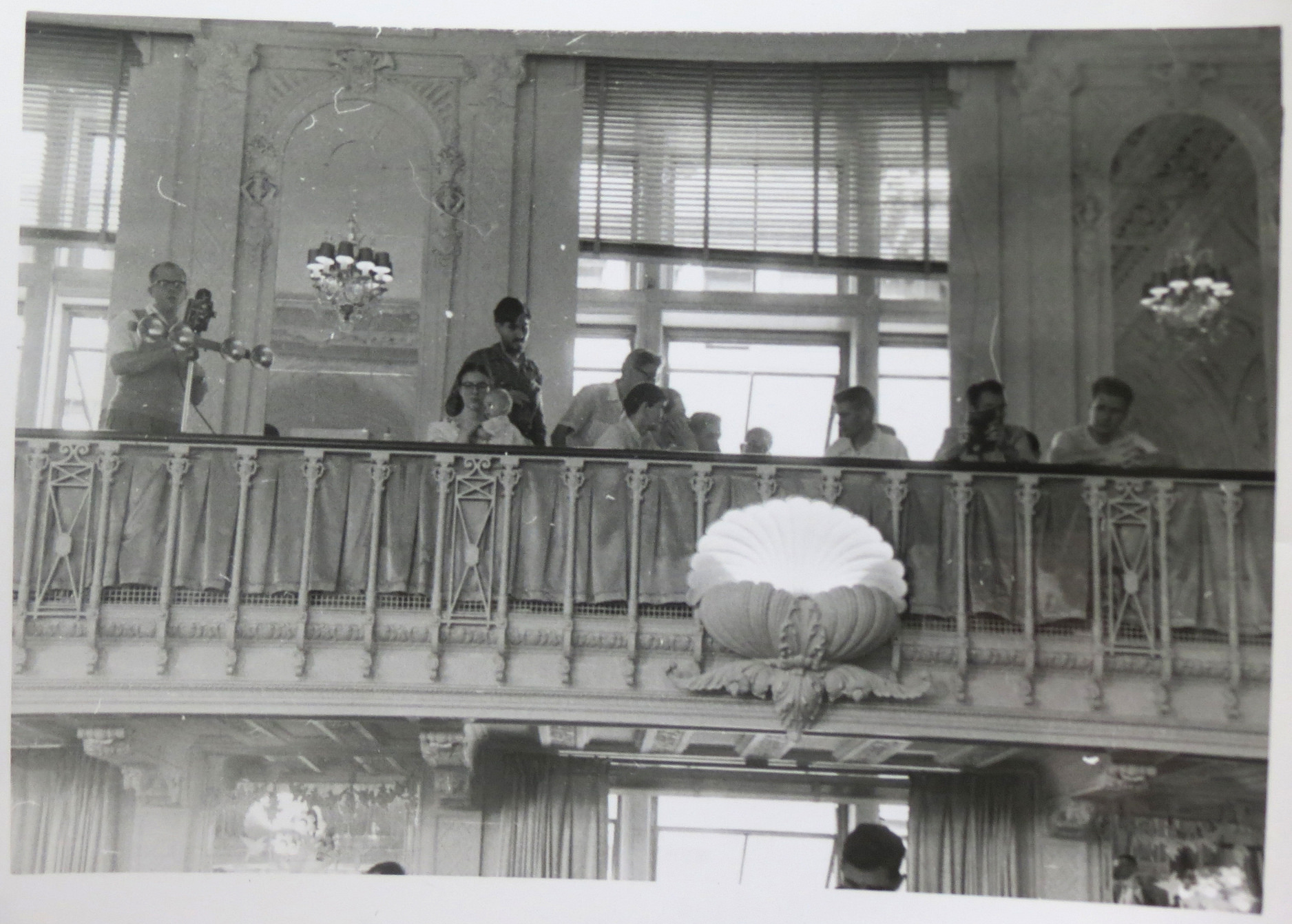
The "Balcony Insurgents" who were told at the 1956 Worldcon, "Dave Kyle says you can't sit here."

Kyle, an active fan since the earliest days of organized science fiction fandom, was an original member of New York's Futurians. In 1936, he published The Fantasy World, possibly the first comics fanzine.

He attended the first Worldcon, and both wrote and printed the "Yellow Pamphlet" condemning the organizers. The manifesto led chairman Sam Moskowitz to ban several prominent members of the Futurians from that convention.

Kyle chaired the 1956 14th World Science Fiction Convention (NyCon II), an incident at which inspired the fan catchphrase, "Dave Kyle says you can't sit here." He was created a Knight of The Order of Saint Fantony in 1961, and was awarded the Big Heart Award in 1973. Kyle was also Fan Guest of Honor at ConStellation, the 41st World Science Fiction Convention, in 1983.

In addition, he wrote hundreds of articles for various fanzines, including regular articles for Richard and Nicki Lynch's Mimosa.

Kyle married another fan, Ruth Evelyn Landis (whom he had met through fandom), on August 31, 1957; for their honeymoon they flew to England for the 1957 Worldcon there, together with 53 friends and in-laws, on a specially chartered flight. They remained married until her death on January 5, 2011. They had a son Arthur and a daughter Kerry.

== See also ==
Morojo
