= Edd Cartier =

American illustrator (1914–2008)

Pulp magazine cover illustration by Edd Cartier

Edward Daniel Cartier (August 1, 1914 – December 25, 2008), known professionally as Edd Cartier, was an American pulp magazine illustrator who specialized in science fiction and fantasy art.

Born in North Bergen, New Jersey, Cartier studied at Pratt Institute. He was taught by Harold Winfield Scott ("H.W. Scott"), also an illustrator for The Avenger, who Cartier credits as a mentor. While a student he began illustrating for The Shadow, eventually creating more than 800 drawings for the pulp. Following his 1936 graduation from Pratt, he and fellow graduate Earl Mayan opened an art studio on the Upper West Side. Cartier's first science fiction cover art was for the December 1939 issue of Unknown. The original oil painting later sold in 1998 for $35,000.

His artwork was published in Street and Smith publications and the John W. Campbell, Jr.-edited magazines Astounding Science Fiction, Doc Savage Magazine and Unknown. He provided more than 300 illustrations for Astounding and over 200 for Unknown. His work later appeared in other magazines, including Planet Stories, Fantastic Adventures and other pulps.

When drawing for The Shadow, Cartier employed dramatic thick swaths of black using the blank spaces as shafts of light. His illustrations evoked the world of the night-time vigilante. He used a different style when illustrating science fiction, employing action and crowded panels. He also injected humor into his drawings. Writers of the Future credited Cartier with a style of "not just very expressive people, but expressive creatures like fairies, gnomes, and gods". His art accompanied the writings of science fiction icons such as Isaac Asimov, Robert A. Heinlein, and Theodore Sturgeon.

== WWII ==
Cartier served in World War II as an infantryman and heavy machine gunner in France and Germany. He was severely wounded in the Battle of the Bulge. He earned a Purple Heart and Bronze Star for his service. Cartier became an active member in the Veterans of Foreign Wars and served as captain of the Color Guard.

After returning to the United States he again attended Pratt Institute. He used the G.I. Bill to continue his education. Cartier received a Bachelor of Fine Arts degree in 1953. In the post-war years, he continued providing illustrations for Astounding. He became the premier artist for Gnome Press and Fantasy Press.

As comic books emerged, the pulp industry began to decline. This led Cartier into employment as a draftsman for an engineering firm during the 1950s. He worked more than 25 years as an art director with Mosstype, a Waldwick, New Jersey, manufacturer specializing in printing machinery.

== Awards and reprints ==
Cartier was selected as one of the inaugural judges for the Writers and Illustrators of the Future in 1985. He remained a judge until his death in 2008. He received the Ron Hubbard’s Writers of the Future (Special Golden Age) Award in 1989. In 1990 he received the First Fandom Hall of Fame Award. He was awarded the 1992 World Fantasy Lifetime Achievement Award. Cartier was nominated for Retro Hugo Awards for artwork published in 1943, 1946, and 1951.

Edd Cartier: The Known and the Unknown is a 2000-copy limited edition hardcover published by Gerry de la Ree in 1977. Cartier's illustrations of L. Ron Hubbard's fiction were reprinted in Master Storyteller: An Illustrated Tour of the Fiction of L. Ron Hubbard by William J. Widder (Galaxy Press, 2003.).

== Personal life ==
Cartier was married in 1943 to Georgina.

Cartier suffered from Parkinson's disease later in life. He died at age 94 on December 25, 2008, at his home in Ramsey, New Jersey. He is interred at George Washington Memorial Park in Paramus, New Jersey.
