= Martin Greenberg (publisher) =

American publisher and editor

- Born: June 28, 1918; New York, U.S.
- Died: October 20, 2013 (aged 95); Medford, New York, U.S.
- Occupations: editor, publisher
- Writing career
- Genre: science fiction

Martin Greenberg (June 28, 1918 – October 20, 2013) was an American book publisher and editor of science fiction anthologies.

== Biography ==
Greenberg married in 1941. He was in the U.S. Army from 1942 to 1945 where he attained the rank of corporal and won five battle stars.

After leaving the Army, Greenberg was associated with the small press publisher New Collector's Group founded by Paul Dennis O'Connor and Hannes Bok. Greenberg and O'Conner clashed about the direction of the press, causing Greenberg to leave, taking the rights to The Carnelian Cube by L. Sprague de Camp and Fletcher Pratt as his buyout fee.

In 1948, Greenberg founded Gnome Press with David Kyle, a fellow member of the Hydra Club, a New York-based science fiction club. The Carnelian Cube was the first book published by the new press. Greenberg edited a number of themed anthologies for Gnome Press.

He was involved in disputes with authors concerning payment, and Isaac Asimov called him a "crook". Greenberg, with Gnome Press, was the first publisher of Asimov's epic Foundation Trilogy, but those rights were long ago transferred to Doubleday. Ultimately, Gnome Press was not successful and it went out of business in 1962. Greenberg went on to work as a mainstream editor for Abelard–Schuman.

Later on, he ran an art supply store on Long Island before retiring. Greenberg died in October 2013 at the age of 95.

== Awards ==
- 2000 First Fandom Hall of Fame award.
