= Operation Future =

1955 anthology edited by Groff Conklin

- Cover of the first edition.
- Editor: Groff Conklin
- Cover artist: Robert Schulz
- Language: English
- Genre: Science fiction
- Publisher: Permabooks
- Publication date: 1955
- Publication place: United States
- Media type: Print (paperback)
- Pages: xi, 356

Operation Future is an anthology of science fiction short stories edited by Groff Conklin. It was first published in paperback by Permabooks in July 1955 and reprinted in September 1956.

The book collects nineteen novellas, novelettes and short stories by various science fiction authors, together with an introduction by the editor. The stories were previously published from 1939-1954 in various science fiction and other magazines.

== Contents ==
- "Introduction" (Groff Conklin)
- "The Education of Drusilla Strange" (Theodore Sturgeon)
- "c/o Mr. Makepeace" (Peter Phillips)
- "Technical Slip" (John Beynon)
- "Short in the Chest" (Idris Seabright)
- "Cure for a Ylith" (Murray Leinster)
- "Exposure" (Eric Frank Russell)
- "Worrywart" (Clifford D. Simak)
- "Day Is Done" (Lester del Rey)
- "Quit Zoomin' Those Hands Through the Air" (Jack Finney)
- "Hilda" (H. B. Hickey)
- "Blood's a Rover" (Chad Oliver)
- "Call Me Adam" (Winston K. Marks)
- "Special Delivery" (Damon Knight)
- "The Garden in the Forest" (Robert F. Young)
- "The Sorcerer's Apprentice" (Malcolm Jameson)
- "Games" (Katherine MacLean)
- "The Holes Around Mars" (Jerome Bixby)
- "Project" (Lewis Padgett (Henry Kuttner and C. L. Moore))
- "The Fun They Had" (Isaac Asimov)
