= Tech Engineering News =

MIT Student publication from 1920 to 1976

Tech Engineering News was a student-run publication at the Massachusetts Institute of Technology from 1920 to 1976.

It started as an advertising supplement for The Tech in 1920, and its last issue was Volume 60 No. 1.

In 1952, it published two short stories by Norbert Wiener: The Brain (anthologized in Groff Conklin's Crossroads in Time) and The Miracle of the Broom Closet (reprinted the same year in The Magazine of Fantasy & Science Fiction).

In 1965, Allan Gottlieb became the editor of the Puzzle Corner, which was later then also carried by Technology Review starting in 1966, and still running in 2015, for a fifty-year run.

In 1967, the magazine republished Martin Graetz' fantasy short story "Building Nine" set at MIT. Graeltz was one of the developers of SpaceWar!, an early video game, while at MIT.
