= Fifty Short Science Fiction Tales =

1963 anthology edited by Isaac Asimov and Groff Conklin

- Cover of the first edition.
- Editors: Isaac Asimov and Groff Conklin
- Language: English
- Genre: Science fiction
- Publisher: Collier Books
- Publication date: 1963
- Publication place: United States
- Media type: Print (paperback)
- Pages: 287

Fifty Short Science Fiction Tales is an anthology of science fiction short stories and poems edited by Isaac Asimov and Groff Conklin. The stories are in the range of 1-4 pages or so long, so would be described now as "short short stories". It was first published in paperback by Collier Books in 1963 and reprinted in 1966, 1968, 1969, 1971, 1973, 1974, 1976, and 1978; a later reprint was issued by Scribner Paperback Fiction in August 1997. The book has been translated into Italian.

The book collects fifty short stories and two poems by various science fiction authors, together with two introductions, one by each editor. The pieces were previously published from 1941 to 1962 in various magazines, not only of science fiction.

== Contents ==
- "Introduction No. 1" (Isaac Asimov)
- "Introduction No. 2" (Groff Conklin)
- "Ballade of an Artificial Satellite" (poem) (Poul Anderson)
- "The Fun They Had" (Isaac Asimov)
- "Men Are Different" (Alan Bloch)
- "The Ambassadors" (Anthony Boucher)
- "The Weapon" (Fredric Brown)
- "Random Sample" (T. P. Caravan)
- "Oscar" (Cleve Cartmill)
- "The Mist" (Peter Cartur)
- "Teething Ring" (James Causey)
- "The Haunted Space Suit" (Arthur C. Clarke)
- "Stair Trick" (Mildred Clingerman)
- "Unwelcome Tenant" (Roger Dee)
- "The Mathematicians" (Arthur Feldman)
- "The Third Level" (Jack Finney)
- "Beautiful, Beautiful, Beautiful!" (Stuart Friedman)
- "The Figure" (Edward Grendon)
- "The Rag Thing" (David Grinnell)
- "The Good Provider" (Marion Gross)
- "Columbus Was a Dope" (Robert A. Heinlein)
- "Texas Week" (Albert Hernhuter)
- "Hilda" (H. B. Hickey)
- "The Choice" (W. Hilton-Young)
- "Not With a Bang" (Damon Knight)
- "The Altar at Midnight" (C. M. Kornbluth)
- "A Bad Day for Sales" (Fritz Leiber)
- "Who's Cribbing?" (Jack Lewis)
- "Spectator Sport" (John D. MacDonald)
- "The Cricket " (Avro Manhattan)
- "Double-Take" (Winston K. Marks)
- "Prolog" (John P. McKnight)
- "The Available Data on the Worp Reaction" (Lion Miller)
- "Narapoia" (Alan Nelson)
- "Tiger by the Tail" (Alan E. Nourse)
- "Counter Charm" (Peter Phillips)
- "The Fly" (Arthur Porges)
- "The Business, As Usual" (Mack Reynolds)
- "Two Weeks in August" (Frank M. Robinson)
- "See?" (Edward G. Robles, Jr.)
- "Appointment at Noon" (Eric Frank Russell)
- "We Don't Want Any Trouble" (James H. Schmitz)
- "Built Down Logically" (Howard Schoenfeld)
- "An Egg a Month from All Over" (Idris Seabright)
- "The Perfect Woman" (Robert Sheckley)
- "The Hunters" (Walt Sheldon)
- "The Martian and the Magician" (Evelyn E. Smith)
- "Barney" (Will Stanton)
- "Talent" (Theodore Sturgeon)
- "Project Hush" (William Tenn)
- "The Great Judge" (A. E. van Vogt)
- "Emergency Landing" (Ralph Williams)
- "Obviously Suicide" (S. Fowler Wright)
- "Six Haiku" (poem) (Karen Anderson)
