= The Science Fiction Galaxy =

1950 anthology edited by Groff Conklin

- Cover of the first edition.
- Editor: Groff Conklin
- Cover artist: Richard Powers
- Language: English
- Genre: Science fiction
- Publisher: Permabooks
- Publication date: 1950
- Publication place: United States
- Media type: Print (hardcover)
- Pages: xii, 242

The Science Fiction Galaxy is an anthology of science fiction short stories edited by Groff Conklin. It was first published in hardcover by Permabooks in 1950.

The book collects twelve novelettes and short stories by various authors, together with an introduction by the editor. The stories were previously published from 1909 to 1949 in various science fiction and other magazines.

== Contents ==
- "Introduction" (Groff Conklin)
- "The Machine Stops" (E. M. Forster)
- "As Easy as A.B.C." (Rudyard Kipling)
- "The Derelict" (William Hope Hodgson)
- "The Fires Within" (Arthur C. Clarke)
- "A Child Is Crying" (John D. MacDonald)
- "Quis Custodiet .... ?" (Margaret St. Clair)
- "The Life-Work of Professor Muntz" (Murray Leinster)
- "The Appendix and the Spectacles" (Miles J. Breuer)
- "Death from the Stars" (A. Rowley Hilliard)
- "The Hurkle Is a Happy Beast" (Theodore Sturgeon)
- "King of the Gray Spaces" (Ray Bradbury)
- "The Living Galaxy" (Laurence Manning)
