= 13 Great Stories of Science Fiction =

1960 anthology edited by Groff Conklin

- Cover of first edition
- Editor: Groff Conklin
- Cover artist: Richard Powers
- Language: English
- Genre: Science fiction
- Publisher: Fawcett Gold Medal
- Publication date: 1960
- Publication place: United States
- Media type: Print (paperback)
- Pages: 192

13 Great Stories of Science Fiction is an anthology of science fiction short stories edited by Groff Conklin. It was first published in paperback by Fawcett Gold Medal in May 1960 and reprinted by Fawcett Gold Medal in September 1962, 1964, December 1969, and July 1979. The first hardcover edition was published by White Lion in 1972. The first British edition was issued by Coronet in 1967 and reprinted in 1972 and 1973.

The book collects thirteen novelettes and short stories by various science fiction authors, together with an introduction by the editor. The stories were previously published from 1946-1957 in various science fiction and other magazines.

== Contents ==
- "Introduction" (Groff Conklin)
- "The War Is Over" (Algis Budrys)
- "The Light" (Poul Anderson)
- "Compassion Circuit" (John Wyndham)
- "Volpla" (Wyman Guin)
- "Silence, Please!" (Arthur C. Clarke)
- "Allegory" (William T. Powers)
- "Soap Opera" (Alan Nelson)
- "Shipping Clerk" (William Morrison)
- "Technological Retreat" (G. C. Edmondson)
- "The Analogues" (Damon Knight)
- "The Available Data on the Worp Reaction" (Lion Miller)
- "The Skills of Xanadu" (Theodore Sturgeon)
- "The Machine" (Richard Gehman)
