= Science Fiction Oddities =

Anthology of science fiction short stories

- cover of first edition
- Editor: Groff Conklin
- Cover artist: Don Punchatz
- Language: English
- Genre: Science fiction
- Publisher: Berkley Medallion
- Publication date: 1966
- Publication place: United States
- Media type: Print (paperback)
- Pages: 350

Science Fiction Oddities is an anthology of science fiction short stories edited by Groff Conklin. It was first published in paperback by Berkley Medallion in November 1966. It was split into two volumes for its first British edition, issued in hardcover by Rapp & Whiting as Science Fiction Oddities and Science Fiction Oddities: Second Series in June 1969.

The book collects six novellas and novelettes by various science fiction authors, together with an introduction by the editor. The stories were previously published from 1952-1964 in various science fiction and other magazines.

== Contents ==
- "Introduction" (Groff Conklin)
- "People Soup" (Alan Arkin)
- "What Is This Thing Called Love?" (Isaac Asimov)
- "Callahan and the Wheelies" (Stephen Barr)
- "Mrs. Poppledore's Id" (R. Bretnor)
- "The Teeth of Despair" (Avram Davidson and Sidney Klein)
- "The Galactic Calabash" (G. C. Edmondson)
- "Space-Crime Continuum" (H. F. Ellis)
- "The Chessplayers" (Charles L. Harness)
- "What's the Name of That Town?" (R. A. Lafferty)
- "Rump-Titty-Titty-Tum-TAH-Tee" (Fritz Leiber)
- "Rundown" (Robert Lory)
- "The Trouble With H.A.R.R.I." (Edward Mackin)
- "The Water Eater" (Winston K. Marks)
- "A Pride of Carrots" (Robert Nathan)
- "The Terra-Venusian War of 1979" (Gerard E. Neyroud)
- "The Coffin Cure" (Alan E. Nourse)
- "On Camera" (John Novotny)
- "See No Evil" (John R. Pierce)
- "Punch" (Frederik Pohl)
