= Big Book of Science Fiction =

1950 anthology edited by Groff Conklin

- cover of first edition
- Editor: Groff Conklin
- Language: English
- Genre: Science fiction
- Publisher: Crown Publishers
- Publication date: 1950
- Publication place: United States
- Media type: Print (hardcover)
- Pages: vii, 545

Big Book of Science Fiction is an anthology of science fiction short stories edited by Groff Conklin. It was first published in hardcover by Crown Publishers in August 1950. A later edition was issued by Bonanza Books/Crown Publishers in 1978 under the alternate title The Classic Book of Science Fiction. An abridged paperback edition containing ten of its 32 stories was published by Berkley Books in April 1957, and reprinted in June 1957 and September 1964; the reprints bore the variant title The Big Book of Science Fiction.

The book collects thirty-two novellas, novelettes and short stories by various science fiction authors, together with an introduction by the editor. The stories were previously published from 1889 to 1950 in various science fiction and other magazines.

== Contents ==
Stories also appearing in the abridged paperback edition annoted with "TBB"

- "Introduction" (Groff Conklin)
- "Mr. Murphy of New York" (Thomas McMorrow)
- "The Diminishing Draft" (Waldemar Kaempffert)
- "Peacebringer" (Ward Moore)
- "A Matter of Form" (Horace L. Gold)
- "The Planetoid of Doom" (Morrison Colladay)
- "One Leg Too Many" (W. Alexander)
- "The Man with the Strange Head" (Miles J. Breuer)
- "Defense Mechanism" (Katherine MacLean)
- "Margin for Error" (Lewis Padgett (Henry Kuttner and C. L. Moore))
- "Isolationist" (Mack Reynolds)
- "Nobody Saw the Ship" (Murray Leinster) TBB
- "Mewhu's Jet" (Theodore Sturgeon) TBB
- "The Outer Limit" (Graham Doar)
- "Rat Race" (Dorothy de Courcy and John de Courcy)
- "Dear Devil" (Eric Frank Russell)
- "Emergency Landing" (Ralph Williams)
- "The Ship That Turned Aside" (Green Peyton)
- "Manna" (Peter Phillips)
- "The Long Dawn" (Noel Loomis)
- "E for Effort" (T. L. Sherred)
- "The Roger Bacon Formula" (Fletcher Pratt) TBB
- "The Wings of Night" (Lester del Rey) TBB
- "Desertion" (Clifford D. Simak) TBB
- "Contact, Incorporated" (Robertson Osborne)
- "Arena" (Fredric Brown) TBB
- "Culture" (Jerry Shelton)
- "In the Year 2889" (Jules Verne)
- "Forever and the Earth" (Ray Bradbury) TBB
- "The Miniature" (Peter Reed) TBB
- "Sanity" (Fritz Leiber) TBB
- "The Only Thing We Learn" (C. M. Kornbluth) TBB
- "Not With a Bang" (Damon Knight )
