= Science-Fiction Adventures in Dimension =

1953 anthology edited by Groff Conklin

- First edition cover
- Editor: Groff Conklin
- Language: English
- Genre: Science fiction
- Publisher: Vanguard Press
- Publication date: 1953
- Publication place: United States
- Media type: Print (Hardback & Paperback)
- Pages: 336

Science-Fiction Adventures in Dimension is an anthology of science fiction stories edited by Groff Conklin, first published by Vanguard Press in hardcover in 1953. An abridged edition was issued by Grayson & Grayson in the UK, and an abridged paperback edition, with a different selection of stories from the original, was issued by Berkley Books; both abridgments carried unhyphenated titles.

== Contents ==
- "Introduction", Groff Conklin
- "Yesterday Was Monday", Theodore Sturgeon (Unknown 1941)
- "Ambition", William L. Bade (Galaxy 1951)
- "The Middle of the Week After Next", Murray Leinster (Thrilling Wonder Stories 1952)
- "And It Comes Out Here", Lester del Rey (Galaxy 1951)
- "Castaway", A. Bertram Chandler (Weird Tales 1947)
- "The Good Provider", Marion Gross (F&SF 1952)
- "Reverse Phylogeny", Amelia Reynolds Long (Astounding 1937)
- "Other Tracks", William Sell (Astounding 1938)
- "What So Proudly We Hail...", Day Keene (Imagination 1950)
- "Night Meeting", Ray Bradbury (The Martian Chronicles 1950)
- "Perfect Murder", Horace L. Gold (Thrilling Wonder Stories 1940)
- "The Flight That Failed," A. E. van Vogt and E. Mayne Hull (Astounding 1942)
- "Endowment Policy, Henry Kuttner and C. L. Moore (Astounding 1943)
- "Pete Can Fix It", Raymond F. Jones (Astounding 1947)
- "The Mist", Peter Cartur (F&SF 1952)
- "The Gostak and the Doshes", Miles J. Breuer (Amazing 1930)
- "What If...", Isaac Asimov (Fantastic 1952)
- "Ring Around the Redhead", John D. MacDonald (Startling Stories 1948)
- "Tiger by the Tail", Alan E. Nourse (Galaxy 1951)
- "Way of Escape", William F. Temple (Thrilling Wonder Stories 1948)
- "Suburban Frontiers", Roger Flint Young (Astounding 1950)
- "Business of Killing", Fritz Leiber (Astounding 1944)
- "To Follow Knowledge", Frank Belknap Long (Astounding 1942)

"Castaway" originally carried the byline "George Whitley". "The Flight That Failed" was originally credited to Hull alone. "Endowment Policy" originally carried the "Lewis Padgett" byline. "Peter Cartur" and "Roger Flint Young" were pseudonyms of Peter Grainger.

== Reception ==
P. Schuyler Miller found Conklin to be "at his very best form" in compiling this volume, which he termed "the top anthology of 1953."
