= Possible Worlds of Science Fiction =

1951 anthology edited by Groff Conklin

- dust cover of first edition
- Editor: Groff Conklin
- Language: English
- Genre: Science fiction
- Publisher: Vanguard Press
- Publication date: 1951
- Publication place: United States
- Media type: Print (hardcover)
- Pages: xi, 372

Possible Worlds of Science Fiction is an anthology of science fiction short stories edited by American anthologist Groff Conklin. It was first published in hardcover by Vanguard Press in 1951. An abridged hardback version including thirteen of its twenty-two stories was published by Grayson & Grayson in 1952; an abridged paperback version including ten of its twenty-two stories was published by Berkley Books in July 1955 and reprinted in April 1956, November 1960, January 1962 and November 1968.

The book collects twenty-two novelettes and short stories by various science fiction authors, together with an introduction by the editor. The stories were previously published from 1936-1950 in various science fiction and other magazines. The Vanguard and Berkley editions are divided into two sections, each with a separate introduction; "Part One: The Solar System", including the first five stories, and "Part Two: The Galaxy", including the last five stories.

== Contents ==
Note: stories also appearing in the abridged hardback edition annoted G&G; stories also appearing in the abridged paperback edition annoted BB)

- "Introduction" (Groff Conklin) G&G
- "Operation Pumice" (Raymond Z. Gallun) G&G
- "The Black Pits of Luna" (Robert A. Heinlein)
- "Enchanted Village" (A. E. van Vogt) G&G, BB
- "Lilies of Life" (Malcolm Jameson) G&G, BB
- "Asleep in Armageddon" (Ray Bradbury) G&G, BB
- "Not Final!" (Isaac Asimov) G&G, BB
- "Cones" (Frank Belknap Long)
- "Moon of Delirium" (D. L. James) G&G
- "Completely Automatic" (Theodore Sturgeon)
- "The Day We Celebrate" (Nelson S. Bond)
- "The Pillows" (Margaret St. Clair) G&G, BB
- "Proof" (Hal Clement)
- "Propagandist" (Murray Leinster) G&G, BB
- "In Value Deceived" (H. B. Fyfe) BB
- "Hard-Luck Diggings" (Jack Vance) G&G
- "Space Rating" (John Berryman) G&G, BB
- "Contagion" (Katherine MacLean)
- "Limiting Factor" (Clifford D. Simak) G&G, BB
- "Exit Line" (Sam Merwin, Jr.) G&G
- "Second Night of Summer" (James H. Schmitz)
- "A Walk in the Dark" (Arthur C. Clarke)
- "The Helping Hand" (Poul Anderson ) G&G, BB
