= Stuart Cloete =

South African writer (1897–1976)

- Born: Edward Fairly Stuart Graham Cloete; 23 July 1897 Paris, France
- Died: 19 March 1976 (aged 78) Cape Town, South Africa
- Occupation: Novelist, essayist, biographer and short story writer

Edward Fairly Stuart Graham Cloete (23 July 1897 – 19 March 1976) was a South African novelist, essayist, biographer and short story writer.

== Early life ==
Cloete was born in Paris to Margaret Edit Park, granddaughter of Glasgow banker Edward Fairley, and Lawrence Woodbine Cloete from South Africa, whose grandfather Henry Cloete had been Special Commissioner in the Colony of Natal. He was educated in England at Lancing College, a school which at present gives out a yearly prize in his honour to a student who excels in literature and creative writing. At Lancing he joined the Officers Training Corps and at the age of seventeen took the Sandhurst entrance exam. From there he was commissioned as a Second-Lieutenant (at the beginning of the First World War in 1914) into the Ninth King's Own Yorkshire Light Infantry, before later transferring to the Coldstream Guards. He was wounded in August 1916 and three days later arrived in London to be nursed at King Edward VII's Hospital Sister Agnes, at 9 Grosvenor Gardens, before convalescing in Hove, Sussex.

== Writing career ==
He published his first novel, Turning Wheels, in 1937: it became a best-seller, selling more than two million copies. Importation of the book was subsequently banned in South Africa, owing to its commentary on the Great Trek, the event in which the book is set.

Many of his 14 novels and most of his short stories are historically based fictional adventures, set against the backdrop of major African, and, in particular, South African historical events. Apart from Turning Wheels, another prominent novel, 1963's Rags of Glory, is set during the Boer war (with, according to its foreword, much of the historical information based on Rayne Kruger's Goodbye Dolly Gray.) Two of his novels were turned into movies: The Fiercest Heart (1961) is based on his 1955 novel of the same name, and Majuba, released in 1968, is based on his 1941 novel The Hill of the Doves. Film producer Albert R. Broccoli attempted to film Rags of Glory in the mid-1960s with David Lean directing, but Lean subsequently – despite his initial interest in the book which he called "very good in an awful sort of way" and its subject matter – rebuffed the offer. By 1974 Broccoli still intended to film the book.

He wrote short stories. He published at least eight volumes in his lifetime.

In addition to producing South-African related works, Cloete was among the pioneers of the by-now voluminous literary subgenre depicting the aftermath of nuclear war. His 1947 novelette The Blast is written as the diary of a survivor living in the ruins of New York (published in 6 Great Short Novels of Science Fiction, ed. Groff Conklin, 1954).

Other written genres to which he contributed included poetry (collected in a volume published in 1941, The Young Men and the Old) and biography (African Portraits, 1946).

He published the first part of his autobiography, A Victorian Son, in 1972 and the second, The Gambler, in 1973.

Stuart Cloete died on 19 March 1976, in Cape Town, South Africa.

Following Cloete's death, the copyright to his works passed to his widow. After her death in August 1993, the copyright passed to Cloete's American-South African friend Warren Wilmot Williams. Although Cloete never wished to have any children of his own, he regarded Williams as an "adopted" son. In the late 1960s Cloete was instrumental in launching the young Williams' career as a documentary film producer and media executive. After inheriting the Stuart Cloete literary estate, Warren Williams established a trust to hold the copyright to Cloete's works. The copyright is managed by the British-based company Stuart Cloete Print Holdings Ltd.

== Personal life ==
He lived most of his adult life in the town of Hermanus, in the Western Cape.

Cloete was married twice, first to Eileen Horsman in July 1917. After their divorce c.1940, his second marriage was to Mildred Elizabeth West, known as Tiny. She outlived him and died in August 1993. Cloete had no children.

== Bibliography ==
=== Novels ===
- Turning Wheels, 1937
- Watch for the Dawn, 1939
- Yesterday is Dead, 1940
- The Hill of Doves, 1941
- The Young Men and the Old, 1941
- Congo Song, 1943
- The Curve and the Tusk, 1953
- The Fiercest Heart, 1955
- Mamba, 1956
- The Mask, 1957
- Gazella, 1958
- Rags of Glory, 1963
- The Abductors, 1966
- How Young they Died, 1969

=== Short fiction ===
Collections

- Christmas in Matabeleland, 1942
- The Third Way, 1947
- The Soldiers' Peaches, and Other African Stories, 1959
- The Silver Trumpet, and Other African Stories, 1961
- The Looking Glass, and Other African Stories, 1963
- The Thousand and One Nights of Jean Macaque, 1964
- The Honey Bird, and Other African Stories, 1964
- The Writing on the Wall, and Other African Stories, 1968
- Three White Swans, and Other Stories, 1971
- The Company with the Heart of Gold, and Other Stories, 1973
- More Nights of Jean Macaque, 1975
- Canary Pie, 1976

Stories

Title	Year	First published	Reprinted/collected	Notes
The Silence of Mr. Prendegast	?	Esquire	Cloete, Stuart (1953). "The Silence of Mr. Prendegast". In Birmingham, Frederic A. (ed.). The Girls from Esquire. London: Arthur Barker. pp. 36–46.	

=== Non-fiction ===
- African Portraits: A Biography of Paul Kruger, Cecil Rhodes and Lobengula, Last King of the Matabele, 1946
- Against These Three, 1947
- The African Giant: The Story of a Journey, 1955
- Storm Over Africa: A Study of the Mau Mau Rebellion, its Causes, Effects, and Implications in Africa South of the Sahara, 1956
- West with the Sun, 1962
- South Africa: The Land, its People and Achievements, 1968
- A Victorian Son: An Autobiography, 1897–1922, 1972
- The Gambler: An Autobiography Volume 2, 1920–1939, 1973

== See also ==
- List of nuclear holocaust fiction
