= The Graveyard Rats =

Short story by Henry Kuttner

- Short story by Henry Kuttner
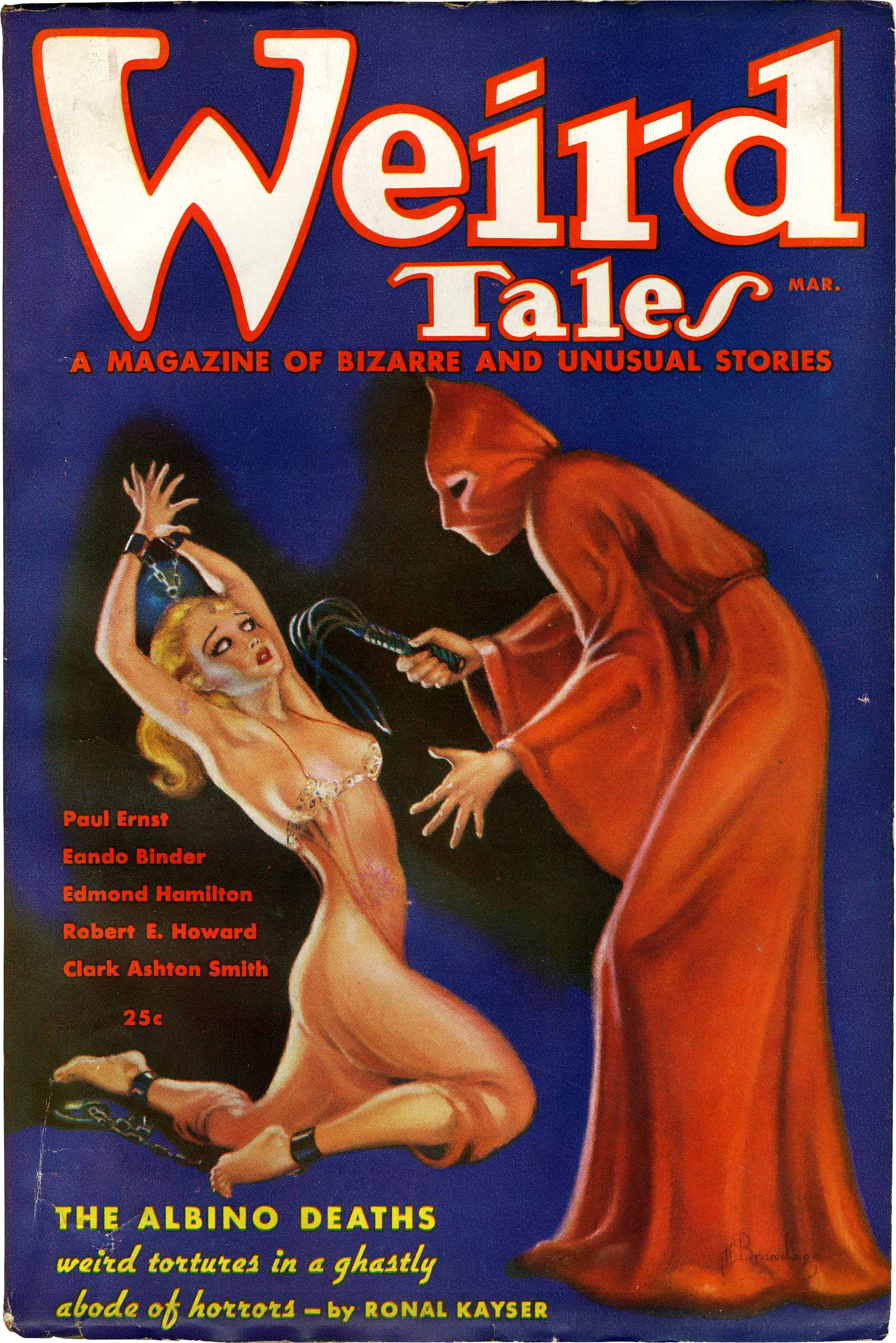
- "The Graveyard Rats" was first published in vol. 27, no. 3 of Weird Tales in March 1936

Text available at Wikisource
- Country: United States
- Language: English
- Genre: Horror fiction

Publication
- Published in: Weird Tales
- Publication type: Print, magazine
- Publication date: March 1936

"The Graveyard Rats" is a horror short story by American writer Henry Kuttner, first published in the magazine Weird Tales in March 1936.

The tale is about a grave robber who encounters supernaturally large rats underground and becomes buried alive thanks to his greed. SF Site calls it "Kuttner's most famous story" in his pulp magazine oeuvre and "a creepy, claustrophobic horror tale quickly become a classic in the genre." Prolific horror editor and scholar Stefan Dziemianowicz writes that the story remains "one of the most impressive debuts in horror fiction."

== Plot ==
At Salem, Massachusetts, cemetery caretaker "Old Masson" must deal with a teeming colony of abnormally large rats that are cutting into his grave-robbing profits; the subterranean rodents drag away newly buried corpses from holes gnawed into the coffins. One night Masson attempts to rob a grave only to see the corpse pulled into a burrow by a rat. In an attempt to retrieve the valuables, Masson crawls into the tunnels after the body. After a short time he realizes how dangerous his situation is and tries to turn back, but is set upon by the rats, which he fends off. As he climbs back up the tunnel, Masson eventually comes face-to-face with a burrowing zombie-like creature, from which he flees down a side tunnel. To escape the undead being, he collapses the tunnel behind him. He then finds himself trapped in a coffin which a rat had previously emptied. Masson, who is a claustrophobe, asphyxiates from lack of air as the rats descend upon him.

== Reprints ==
"The Graveyard Rats" became one of the most frequently reprinted stories from Weird Tales. Dziemianowicz writes, "Like most of his weird fiction, it was never collected in his lifetime and escaped inclusion in the various Best of Kuttner volumes assembled posthumously." However, "The Graveyard Rats" has been anthologized dozens of times and translated into German, Swedish, Italian, French, and other languages. Some of the more notable anthologies it was reprinted in include The Graveyard Reader (1958), edited by Groff Conklin; The Fifth Fontana Book of Great Horror Stories (1970; the anthology itself reprinted often), edited by Mary Danby; 65 Great Spine Chillers (1982; the anthology reprinted often), edited by Mary Danby; The Gruesome Book (1983), edited by Ramsey Campbell; The Horror Hall of Fame (1991- ), edited by Martin H. Greenberg and Robert Silverberg; Weird Tales: Seven Decades of Terror (1997), edited by John Gregory Betancourt and Robert Weinberg; and Zombies! Zombies! Zombies! (2011), edited by Otto Penzler.

"The Graveyard Rats" did finally appear in a Kuttner collection in 2005, with the publication of Two-Handed Engine: The Selected Stories of Henry Kuttner and C. L. Moore, edited by David Curtis.

Anthologies including "The Graveyard Rats" became available via ebook, MP3, podcasts, and audio compact discs beginning in 2010.

== Adaptations ==
- 1996: First of three parts of the made-for-cable anthology film Trilogy of Terror II, with screenplay by Dan Curtis and William F. Nolan. Starring Lysette Anthony, Geraint Wyn Davies, and Matt Clark, it is only loosely based on the Kuttner story, being chiefly a drama about a greedy wife and her chauffeur lover who murder her wealthy husband, only to be stymied by inheritance law and then to meet their rodent comeuppance. The cemetery keeper, played by Geoffrey Lewis, is a minor role.
- 2014: Episode 7 of the first season of Suspense (2014-2019), a revival of the classic television anthology series of the same title that ran from 1949 to 1954. Directed by John C. Alsedek and scripted by Alsedek and Dana Perry-Hayes, it stars Daamen J. Krall as "Old Massen" and Christopher Duva as "Simmonds," two New England body-snatchers. Aired Oct 10, 2014.
- 2022: Episode 2, "Graveyard Rats", written and directed by Vincenzo Natali, of Guillermo del Toro's Cabinet of Curiosities. The film is faithful to the story, with David Hewlett playing Masson.
- 2023: 35-minute episode of Classic Ghost Stories, a weekly podcast presenting dramatic readings of ghost stories, horror stories and weird tales; released on October 27, 2023.
- 2025: "Las Ratas del Cementerio" appears on Spanish-language podcast Selecciones de Cineficción Radio, as Act 3 of episode #32, "En el Cementerio," a trilogy of short stories. Produced by Darío Lavia and read/performed by veteran horror actor Chucho Fernández; artwork by Gustavo Adolfo Bécquer, Lee Brown Coye, José Casado del Alisal, and others; available on YouTube.

== Reception ==
Stefan Dziemianowicz writes that the story "succeeds on the strength of its claustrophobic atmosphere, well-executed plot twists, and tense, taut prose. ... Kuttner mastered the kind of neo-Gothic tale full of ghouls and graveyards that was Weird Tales' stock [in] trade." Time magazine film critic Richard Corliss said that the story had always given him "the willies." A book reviewer for The Wall Street Journal called it "an ickily claustrophobic tale of a grave-robbing gone wrong. There are classier stories out there, but they're not nearly as fun."

Two H. P. Lovecraft scholars for Reactor compare "The Graveyard Rats" with other weird fiction of the time. Anne Pillsworth writes that it "recalls several Lovecraft stories, 'The Rats in the Walls' [1923] perhaps the most superficially. ... 'Graveyard Rats,' in general structure and theme, has more in common with 'In the Vault' [1925], which also features an unsavory cemetery caretaker who in the end GETS WHAT HE DESERVES. ... For me, with its meticulously detailed build-up to horror, 'In the Vault' is the superior squirm-inducer, but Kuttner did get me good with Masson's 'premature burial.' The twist makes for a clever take on the conte cruel." Ruthanna Emrys compares the story with Lovecraft's "The Hound" [1924], another ghouls-and-grave-robbing tale, and observes, "Masson's grave robbing is not for fiendish consumption, gothic thrills, or unholy imprisonment via essential saltes, but for simple greed. ... Kuttner being Kuttner, Masson's ultimate demise is more poetically symmetrical than truly terrifying. He escapes the rats and mummies, and in doing so buries himself alive in a rat-emptied coffin."
