= Science Fiction Adventures in Mutation =

1955 anthology edited by Groff Conklin

- First edition cover
- Editor: Groff Conklin
- Language: English
- Genre: Science fiction
- Publisher: Vanguard Press
- Publication date: 1955
- Publication place: United States
- Media type: Print (hardback & paperback)
- Pages: 316

Science Fiction Adventures in Mutation is a theme anthology of science fiction stories edited by American anthologist Groff Conklin, published in hardcover by Vanguard Press in 1955. An abridged paperback edition was issued by Berkley Books in 1965.

== Contents ==
- "Introduction", Groff Conklin
- "Chain of Command", Stephen Arr (Galaxy 1954)
- "Battle of the Unborn", James Blish (Future 1950)
- "The Hungry Guinea Pig", Miles J. Breuer (Amazing 1930)
- "Keep Out", Fredric Brown (Amazing 1954)
- "The Small World of M-75", Ed M. Clinton, Jr. (IF 1954)
- "Limiting Factor", Theodore R. Cogswell (Galaxy 1954)
- "The Lysenko Maze", Donald A. Wollheim (F&SF 1954)
- "The Patient", E. Mayne Hull (Unknown 1943)
- "Cold War", Henry Kuttner (Thrilling Wonder Stories 1949)
- "Skag with the Queer Head", Murray Leinster (Marvel Science Fiction 1951)
- "Veiled Island", Emmett McDowell (Astounding 1946)
- "Experimental Station", Kris Neville (Super Science Stories 1950)
- "Family Resemblance", Alan E. Nourse (Astounding 1953)
- "And Thou Beside Me", Mack Reynolds (F&SF 1954)
- "This One’s on Me", Eric Frank Russell (Nebula 1953)
- "The Age of Prophecy", Margaret St. Clair (Future 1951)
- "Love of Heaven", Theodore Sturgeon (Astounding 1948)
- "The Impossible Voyage Home", Floyd L. Wallace (Galaxy 1954)
- "The Conspirators", James White (New Worlds 1954)
- "The Better Choice", S. Fowler Wright
- "Bibliography of Mutation Stories"

"The Lysenko Maze" appeared under the "David Grinnell" pseudonym. "Experimental Station" was originally published as "The First".

== Reception ==
J. Francis McComas, writing in The New York Times, found the volume to be less successful than Conklin's four previous theme anthologies, because the chosen theme was "too narrow," but praised Conklin's story notes as "entertaining and effective."
