= 13 Above the Night (anthology) =

1965 anthology edited by Groff Conklin

- cover of first edition
- Editor: Groff Conklin
- Language: English
- Genre: Science fiction
- Publisher: Dell Books
- Publication date: 1965
- Publication place: United States
- Media type: Print (paperback)
- Pages: 286
- OCLC: 05821976
- LC Class: PS648.S3 T382 1965

13 Above the Night is an anthology of science fiction short stories edited by American anthologist Groff Conklin. It was first published in paperback by Dell Books in October 1965; it was reprinted in November 1969.

The book collects thirteen novelettes and short stories by various science fiction authors, together with an introduction by the editor. The stories were previously published from 1951 to 1963 in various science fiction magazines.

== Contents ==
- "Introduction" (Groff Conklin)
- "Founding Father" (J. F. Bone)
- "Mating Call" (Frank Herbert)
- "Nice Girl with Five Husbands" (Fritz Leiber)
- "Prone" (Mack Reynolds)
- "The Education of Tigress McCardle" (C. M. Kornbluth)
- "Now Inhale" (Eric Frank Russell)
- "The Back of Our Heads" (Stephen Barr)
- "Button, Button" (Isaac Asimov)
- "The Deep Down Dragon" (Judith Merril)
- "The Kappa Nu Nexus" (Avram Davidson and Morton Klass)
- "Idiot Solvant" (Gordon R. Dickson)
- "Counter Security" (James White)
- "The Dreistein Case" (J. Lincoln Paine)
