= Crossroads in Time =

- Cover of the first edition.
- Editor: Groff Conklin
- Cover artist: Richard Powers
- Language: English
- Genre: Science fiction
- Publisher: Permabooks
- Publication date: 1953
- Publication place: United States
- Media type: Print (paperback)
- Pages: 312

Crossroads in Time is an anthology of science fiction short stories edited by Groff Conklin. It was first published in paperback by Permabooks in November 1953. It has also been translated into Spanish.

The book collects eighteen novellas, novelettes and short stories by various science fiction authors, together with an introduction by the editor. The stories were previously published from 1936-1953 in various science fiction and other magazines.

== Contents ==
- "Introduction" (Groff Conklin)
- "Assumption Unjustified" (Hal Clement)
- "The Eagles Gather" (Joseph E. Kelleam)
- "The Queen's Astrologer" (Murray Leinster)
- "Derm Fool" (Theodore Sturgeon)
- "Courtesy" (Clifford D. Simak)
- "Secret" (Lee Cahn)
- "Thirsty God" (Margaret St. Clair)
- "The Mutant's Brother" (Fritz Leiber)
- "Student Body" (F. L. Wallace)
- "Made in U.S.A. " (J. T. McIntosh)
- "Technical Advisor" (Chad Oliver)
- "Feedback" (Katherine MacLean)
- "The Cave" (P. Schuyler Miller)
- "Vocation" (George O. Smith)
- "The Time Decelerator" (A. Macfadyen, Jr.)
- "Zen" (Jerome Bixby)
- "Let There Be Light" (Horace B. Fyfe)
- "The Brain" (W. Norbert)
