= In the Grip of Terror =

Horror anthology

- Cover of the first edition.
- Editor: Groff Conklin
- Language: English
- Genre: Horror
- Publisher: Permabooks
- Publication date: 1951
- Publication place: United States
- Media type: Print (paperback)
- Pages: xii, 364
- OCLC: 01872109
- LC Class: PN6071.H727 I5 1951

In the Grip of Terror is an anthology of horror short stories edited by Groff Conklin. It was first published in paperback by Permabooks in 1951.

The book collects twenty-two novellas, novelettes, and short stories by various authors, together with an introduction by the editor. The stories were previously published from 1842-1950 in various magazines.

== Contents ==
- "Introduction" by Groff Conklin
- "The Last Kiss" by Maurice Level
- "The Illustrated Man" by Ray Bradbury
- "The Upturned Face" by Stephen Crane
- "The Incredible Elopement of Lord Peter Wimsey" by Dorothy L. Sayers
- "The Horror-Horn" by E. F. Benson
- "Night Drive" by Will F. Jenkins
- "In the Vault" by H. P. Lovecraft
- "The Diary of a Madman" by Guy de Maupassant
- "The Tool" by William F. Harvey
- "Bianca's Hands" by Theodore Sturgeon
- "The Cross of Carl" by Walter Owen
- "Hathor's Pets" by Margaret St. Clair
- "A Terribly Strange Bed" by Wilkie Collins
- "The Well" by W. W. Jacobs
- "Revenge" by Samuel Blas
- "The Pit and the Pendulum" by Edgar Allan Poe
- "Macklin's Little Friend" by H. W. Guernsey
- "The Easter Egg" by H. H. Munro
- "Problem in Murder" by H. L. Gold
- "The Moth" by H. G. Wells
- "A Resumed Identity" by Ambrose Bierce
- "Bubbles" by Wilbur Daniel Steele
