= Great Science Fiction by Scientists =

Science fiction anthology

- Cover of the first edition.
- Editor: Groff Conklin
- Language: English
- Genre: Science fiction
- Publisher: Collier Books
- Publication date: 1962
- Publication place: United States
- Media type: Print (paperback)
- Pages: 313

Great Science Fiction by Scientists is an anthology of science fiction short stories edited by Groff Conklin. It was first published in paperback by Collier Books in 1962; it was reprinted twice in that year and again in 1966, 1967, 1968, 1970 and 1978.

The book collects sixteen novellas, novelettes and short stories by various science fiction authors who also happened to be actual scientists, together with an introduction by the editor. The stories were previously published from 1926-1961 in various science fiction and other magazines.

== Contents ==
- "On Science Fiction by Scientists" (Groff Conklin)
- "What If ..." (Isaac Asimov)
- "The Ultimate Catalyst" (Eric Temple Bell)
- "The Gostak and the Doshes" (Miles J. Breuer, M.D.)
- "Summertime on Icarus" (Arthur C. Clarke)
- "The Neutrino Bomb" (Ralph S. Cooper)
- "Last Year's Grave Undug" (Chan Davis)
- "The Gold-Makers" (J. B. S. Haldane)
- "The Tissue-Culture King" (Julian Huxley)
- "A Martian Adventure" (Willy Ley)
- "Learning Theory" (James McConnell)
- "The Mother of Necessity" (Chad Oliver)
- "John Sze's Future" (John R. Pierce)
- "Kid Anderson" (Robert S. Richardson)
- "Pilot Lights of the Apocalypse" (Dr. Louis N. Ridenour)
- "Grand Central Terminal" (Leo Szilard)
- "The Brain" (Norbert Wiener)

== Reception ==
Floyd C. Gale of Galaxy Science Fiction rated the collection 4.5 stars out of five, stating that "Conklin has come up with an engrossing 'idea' anthology".
