= MS Fnd in a Lbry =

Short story by Hal Draper

MS Fnd in a Lbry (probably intended to be understood as "Manuscript Found in a Library") is a satirical science fiction short story about the disastrous effects of the exponential growth of information. The story was written by Hal Draper in 1961. Its title is a play on the Edgar Allan Poe story "MS. Found in a Bottle".

== Plot ==
The story is in the form of a report written by Yrlh Vvg, an anthropologist from an alien civilization who investigates the remains of human civilization approximately 175,000 yukals into the future. It turns out that humankind's fall was brought about by information overload and the inability to catalog and retrieve that information properly.

The title of the short story comes from the fact that all redundancy - and vowels - had been removed from our language in order for the information volume to shrink. Finally the sum of all human knowledge was compressed by means of subatomic processes and stored away in a drawer-sized box. However the access to that information required complicated indices, bibliographies etc., which soon outgrew the size of all knowledge.

The use of indices grew exponentially, comprising a pseudo-city, pseudo-planet and eventually a pseudo-galaxy devoted to information storage. At this point, a case of circular reference was encountered, and the civilization needed to refer to the first drawer-sized box to find the error. However, this drawer had been lost in the pseudo-galaxy, and soon the civilization fell apart while trying to locate the first drawer.

It turns out that the anthropologist's civilization is actually heading down the same path.

== History ==
In a December 12, 1960 article in Time magazine, Richard Feynman predicted that the explosion of information and storage made possible by the computer revolution would necessitate shrinking the size of information. Feynman offered a prize for anyone who could shrink a page of information down 1/25,000 size that could still be read by an electron microscope. MIT librarian Malcolm Ferguson wrote that Feynman's idea "may provoke discussion and perplexity" in an article for Library Journal in November 1961. Draper's satirical story "MS Fnd in a Lbry" envisaged a world where information was reduced to a microscopic scale and required indices of indices to retrieve the data.

The short story first appeared in the December 1961 issue of The Magazine of Fantasy and Science Fiction. It was anthologized in the collections 17 X Infinity (1963) edited by Groff Conklin and Laughing Space (1982), edited by Isaac and Janet Asimov. It was also published as "Ms Fnd in a Lbry: or, the Day Civilization Collapsed".

The story inspired a discussion on adopting computers in libraries at a symposium on technological advances in medical librarianship in 1963.

== See also ==
- Metadata, the modern concept satirised in the story.
- The Book of Sand, fiction story about a book with infinite pages
- The Library of Babel, fiction story about a library containing every possible book
- LCARS, fictional computer operating system containing the sum of human knowledge
- Fortress of Solitude, fictional repository of the knowledge of an extinct planet
