= Omnibus of Science Fiction =

1952 anthology edited by Groff Conklin

- Dust cover of first edition.
- Editor: Groff Conklin
- Language: English
- Genre: Science fiction
- Publisher: Crown Publishers
- Publication date: 1952
- Publication place: United States
- Media type: Print (hardcover)
- Pages: xiii, 562

Omnibus of Science Fiction is an anthology of science fiction short stories edited by Groff Conklin. It was first published in hardcover by Crown Publishers in 1952, and reprinted in 1953; a book club edition was issued by the same publisher with the Science Fiction Book Club in the same year. Later editions were issued by Bonanza Books/Crown Publishers in 1984, Chatham River Press in 1984, and Random House in 1988. An abridged paperback version including eleven of its forty-three stories was published by Berkley Books in August 1956 under the variant title Science Fiction Omnibus and reprinted in November 1963. A two-volume British edition, also abridged, was published in hardcover by Grayson & Grayson in 1953-1954 under the variant titles Strange Travels in Science Fiction and Strange Adventures in Science Fiction; together, they included twenty-two of the original forty-three stories.

The book collects forty-three novellas, novelettes and short stories by various science fiction authors, together with an introduction by the editor. The stories were previously published between 1912 and 1952 in various science fiction and other magazines.

== Contents ==
Note: stories also appearing in one of the abridged editions annotated OM (Science Fiction Omnibus), AD (Strange Adventures in Science Fiction) or TR (Strange Travels in Science Fiction).

- "Introduction" (Groff Conklin)
- "John Thomas's Cube" (John Leimert) TR
- "Hyperpilosity" (L. Sprague de Camp)
- "The Thing in the Woods" (Fletcher Pratt and B. F. Ruby)
- "And Be Merry ..." (Katherine MacLean)
- "The Bees from Borneo" (Will H. Gray)
- "The Rag Thing" (David Grinnell)
- "The Conqueror" (Mark Clifton)
- "Never Underestimate ..." (Theodore Sturgeon) AD
- "The Doorbell" (David H. Keller) AD
- "A Subway Named Mobius" (A. J. Deutsch) OM TR
- "Backfire" (Ross Rocklynne)
- "The Box" (James Blish) AD
- "Zeritsky's Law" (Ann Warren Griffith)
- "The Fourth Dynasty" (R. R. Winterbotham)
- "The Colour Out of Space" (H. P. Lovecraft) OM TR
- "The Head Hunters" (Ralph Williams)
- "The Star Dummy" (Anthony Boucher) OM TR
- "Catch That Martian" (Damon Knight) AD
- "Shipshape Home" (Richard Matheson) TR
- "Homo Sol" (Isaac Asimov) OM
- "Alexander the Bait" (William Tenn)
- "Kaleidoscope" (Ray Bradbury) OM TR
- ""Nothing Happens on the Moon"" (Paul Ernst) TR
- "Trigger Tide" (Norman Menasco)
- "Plague" (Murray Leinster) OM TR
- "Winner Lose All" (Jack Vance)
- "Test Piece" (Eric Frank Russell) OM
- "Environment" (Chester S. Geier) AD
- "High Threshold" (Alan E. Nourse) TR
- "Spectator Sport" (John D. MacDonald) OM AD
- "Recruiting Station" (A. E. van Vogt) AD
- "A Stone and a Spear" (Raymond F. Jones) TR
- "What You Need" (Lewis Padgett (Henry Kuttner and C. L. Moore))
- "The Choice" (Wayland Hilton-Young) AD
- "The War Against the Moon" (André Maurois)
- "Pleasant Dreams" (Ralph Robin) TR
- "Manners of the Age" (H. B. Fyfe) TR
- "The Weapon" (Fredric Brown) OM TR
- "The Scarlet Plague" (Jack London) TR
- "Heritage" (Robert Abernathy)
- "History Lesson" (Arthur C. Clarke) OM
- "Instinct" (Lester del Rey) OM
- "Counter Charm" (Peter Phillips)
