= 4 for the Future =

1959 anthology

- cover of first edition
- Editor: Groff Conklin
- Cover artist: Richard Powers
- Language: English
- Genre: Science fiction novelettes
- Publisher: Pyramid Books
- Publication date: 1959
- Publication place: United States
- Media type: Print (paperback)
- Pages: 160 pp.

4 for the Future is an anthology of science fiction novelettes edited by Groff Conklin. It was first published in paperback by Pyramid Books in August 1959 and was reprinted in June 1962. The first British edition, also in paperback, was issued by Consul Books in 1961.

The book collects four novelettes by various science fiction authors. The stories were previously published from 1944 to 1956 in various science fiction magazines.

== Contents ==
- "Enough Rope" (Poul Anderson)
- "The Claustrophile" (Theodore Sturgeon)
- "The Children's Hour" (Henry Kuttner and C. L. Moore)
- "Plus X" (Eric Frank Russell)
