= The Man Who Corrupted Earth =

1980 novel

The Man Who Corrupted Earth is a novel by G. C. Edmondson published in 1980.

== Plot summary ==
The Man Who Corrupted Earth is a novel about the wealthy eccentric Gus Dampier whose son-in-law swindled the directorship of his company away from him.

== Reception ==
Greg Costikyan reviewed The Man Who Corrupted Earth in Ares Magazine #5 and commented that "The Man Who Corrupted Earth is only the second novel I've seen by Edmonson- the excellent (and recently reprinted) The Ship that Sailed the Time Stream is the other. One awaits the next eagerly; Edmonson is a writer."

== Reviews ==
- Review by Keith Soltys (1981) in Science Fiction Review, Spring 1981
