= Elsewhere and Elsewhen =

1968 anthology by Groff Conklin

- Cover of first edition.
- Editor: Groff Conklin
- Cover artist: Don Punchatz
- Language: English
- Genre: Science fiction
- Publisher: Berkley Medallion
- Publication date: 1968
- Publication place: United States
- Media type: Print (paperback)
- Pages: 253

Elsewhere and Elsewhen is an anthology of science fiction short stories edited by Groff Conklin. It was first published in paperback by Berkley Medallion in May 1968. It was split into two shorter anthologies for British publication; Science Fiction Elsewhere and Science Fiction Elsewhen, both issued in hardcover by Rapp & Whiting in July 1970.

The book collects nine novelettes and short stories by various science fiction authors, together with an introduction by the editor. The stories were previously published from 1953 to 1965 in various science fiction and other magazines.

== Contents ==
- "Introduction" (Groff Conklin)
- "Shortstack" (Leigh Richmond and Walt Richmond)
- "How Allied" (Mark Clifton)
- "The Wrong World" (J. T. McIntosh)
- "World in a Bottle" (Allen Kim Lang)
- "Think Blue, Count Two" (Cordwainer Smith)
- "Turning Point" (Poul Anderson)
- "The Book" (Michael Shaara)
- "Trouble Tide" (James H. Schmitz)
- "The Earthman's Burden" (Donald E. Westlake)
