= The Graveyard Reader =

- Cover of the first edition
- Editor: Groff Conklin
- Cover artist: Richard Powers
- Language: English
- Genre: Horror
- Publisher: Ballantine Books
- Publication date: 1958
- Publication place: United States
- Media type: Print (paperback)
- Pages: 156

The Graveyard Reader is an anthology of horror short stories edited by Groff Conklin. It was first published in paperback by Ballantine Books in 1958, and reprinted in November 1965.

The book collects twelve novelettes and short stories by various authors, together with an introduction by the editor. The stories were previously published from 1861-1958 in various magazines.

== Contents ==
- "Introduction" by Groff Conklin
- "The Screaming Woman" by Ray Bradbury
- "A Bottomless Grave" by Ambrose Bierce
- "The Cart" by Richard Hughes
- "The Graveyard Rats" by Henry Kuttner
- "Skin" by Roald Dahl
- "Night Court" by Mary Elizabeth Counselman
- "Free Dirt" by Charles Beaumont
- "Listen, Children, Listen!" by Wallace West
- "Special Delivery" by John Collier
- "The Child That Loved a Grave" by Fitz-James O'Brien
- "The Outsider" by H. P. Lovecraft
- "The Graveyard Reader" by Theodore Sturgeon
