= Br-r-r-! =

- Cover of the first edition.
- Editor: Groff Conklin
- Cover artist: Richard Powers
- Language: English
- Genre: Horror
- Publisher: Avon
- Publication date: 1959
- Publication place: United States
- Media type: Print (paperback)
- Pages: 192

Br-r-r-! is an anthology of horror short stories edited by Groff Conklin. It was first published in paperback by Avon in 1959.

The book collects ten novelettes and short stories by various authors, together with an introduction by the editor. The stories were previously published between 1915 and 1957 in various magazines.

== Contents ==
- "Introduction" (Groff Conklin)
- "It" (Theodore Sturgeon)
- "Nursery Rhyme" (Charles Beaumont)
- "Doomsday Deferred" (Will F. Jenkins)
- "Warm, Dark Places" (Horace L. Gold)
- "Legal Rites" (Isaac Asimov and James MacCreigh)
- "An Egyptian Hornet" (Algernon Blackwood)
- "White Goddess" (Idris Seabright)
- "The Handler" (Ray Bradbury)
- "The Sound Machine" (Roald Dahl)
- "The Worm" (David H. Keller, M.D.)

== See also ==
- The dictionary definition of brrr at Wiktionary
