= 12 Great Classics of Science Fiction =

1963 anthology edited by Groff Conklin

- Cover of first edition
- Editor: Groff Conklin
- Language: English
- Genre: Science fiction
- Publisher: Gold Medal Books
- Publication date: 1963
- Publication place: United States
- Media type: Print (paperback)
- Pages: 192

12 Great Classics of Science Fiction is an anthology of science fiction short stories edited by Groff Conklin. It was first published in paperback by Gold Medal Books in December 1963 and reprinted by Fawcett Gold Medal in May 1966, February 1970, and 1973.

The book collects twelve novelettes and short stories by various science fiction authors, together with an introduction by the editor. The stories were previously published from 1953 to 1963 in various science fiction and other magazines.

== Contents ==
- "Introduction" (Groff Conklin)
- "Due Process" (Algis Budrys)
- "Earthmen Bearing Gifts" (Fredric Brown)
- "Things" (Zenna Henderson)
- "The Top" (George Sumner Albee)
- "My Object All Sublime" (Poul Anderson)
- "Human Man's Burden" (Robert Sheckley)
- "On the Fourth Planet" (J. F. Bone)
- "The Ballad of Lost C'Mell" (Cordwainer Smith)
- "Thirty Days Had September" (Robert F. Young)
- "The Cage" (A. Bertram Chandler)
- "Star-Crossed Lover" (William W. Stuart)
- "Immortality ... for Some" (J. T. McIntosh)
