= Worlds of When =

Anthology of science fiction short stories by Geoff Conklin

- Cover of the first edition.
- Editor: Groff Conklin
- Cover artist: John Schoenherr
- Language: English
- Genre: Science fiction
- Publisher: Pyramid Books
- Publication date: 1962
- Publication place: United States
- Media type: Print (paperback)
- Pages: 159

Worlds of When is an anthology of science fiction short stories edited by Groff Conklin. It was first published in paperback by Pyramid Books in May 1962.

The book collects four novelettes and one short story by various science fiction authors, together with an introductory note by the editor. The stories were previously published from 1954 to 1961 in various science fiction and other magazines.

== Contents ==
- "Introductory Note" (Groff Conklin)
- "Transfusion" (Chad Oliver)
- "Bullet With His Name" (Fritz Leiber)
- "Death and the Senator" (Arthur C. Clarke)
- "Farmer" (Mack Reynolds)
- "Rations of Tantalus" (Margaret St. Clair)
