= Science Fiction Terror Tales =

1955 anthology of science fiction horror short stories edited by Groff Conklin

- Dust-jacket from the first edition
- Editor: Groff Conklin
- Cover artist: Ed Emshwiller
- Language: English
- Genre: Science fiction, horror
- Publisher: Gnome Press
- Publication date: 1955
- Publication place: United States
- Media type: Print (hardback)
- Pages: x, 262
- OCLC: 01418106
- Dewey Decimal: 808.83
- LC Class: PZ1.C64 S24

Science Fiction Terror Tales is an anthology of science fiction horror short stories edited by Groff Conklin. It was first published in hardcover by Gnome Press in January 1955; it was reprinted, unabridged, by Pocket Books in March 1955, and reprinted again in June 1971. The first British edition was published under the alternate title Possible Tomorrows in hardcover by Sidgwick & Jackson in June 1972; a paperback edition was issued by Coronet under the same title in September 1973. It was later gathered together with the Donald A. Wollheim-edited anthology Trilogy of the Future into the omnibus anthology Science Fiction Special 9 (Sidgwick & Jackson, April 1974).

The book collects fifteen novelettes and short stories by various science fiction authors, together with an introduction by the editor. The stories were previously published from 1936-1954 in the magazines Other Worlds, Astounding SF, Galaxy Science Fiction, Fantasy and Science Fiction, Thrilling Wonder Stories, Unknown and Universe.

== Contents ==
- "Introduction" (Groff Conklin)
- "Punishment Without Crime" (Ray Bradbury)
- "Arena" (Fredric Brown)
- "The Leech" (Robert Sheckley)
- "Through Channels" (Richard Matheson)
- "Lost Memory" (Peter Phillips)
- "Memorial" (Theodore Sturgeon)
- "Prott" (Margaret St. Clair)
- "Flies" (Isaac Asimov)
- "The Microscopic Giants" (Paul Ernst)
- "The Other Inauguration" (Anthony Boucher)
- "Nightmare Brother" (Alan E. Nourse)
- "Pipeline to Pluto" (Murray Leinster)
- "Impostor" (Philip K. Dick)
- "They" (Robert A. Heinlein)
- "Let Me Live in a House" (Chad Oliver)
