= Giants Unleashed =

1965 anthology edited by Groff Conklin

- Cover of the first edition.
- Editor: Groff Conklin
- Cover artist: Louis S. Glanzman
- Language: English
- Genre: Science fiction
- Publisher: Grosset & Dunlap
- Publication date: 1965
- Publication place: United States
- Media type: Print (hardcover)
- Pages: viii, 248
- OCLC: 01144061
- Dewey Decimal: 808.83
- LC Class: PS648 .S3 C6

Giants Unleashed is an anthology of science fiction short stories edited by Groff Conklin. It was first published in hardcover by Grosset & Dunlap in 1965. A paperback edition followed from the publisher's Tempo Books imprint in April 1966. It was reprinted, minus the introduction and under the alternate title Minds Unleashed, in October 1970.

The book collects twelve novelettes and short stories by various science fiction authors, together with an introduction by the editor. The stories were previously published from 1939-1958 in various science fiction and other magazines.

== Contents ==
- "The Non-Limitation of Intelligence" (introduction) (Groff Conklin)
- "Microcosmic God" (Theodore Sturgeon)
- "Commencement Night" (Richard Ashby)
- "The Deep Range" (Arthur C. Clarke)
- "Machine Made" (J. T. McIntosh)
- "Trip One" (Edward Grendon)
- "Venus is a Man's World" (William Tenn)
- "Good-Bye, Ilha!" (Lawrence Manning)
- "Misbegotten Missionary" (Isaac Asimov)
- "The Ethical Equations" (Murray Leinster)
- "Misfit" (Robert A. Heinlein)
- "Genius" (Poul Anderson)
- "Basic Right" (Eric Frank Russell)

== Reception ==
John ONeill, covering the 1970 reprint edition retrospectively on blackgate.com, writes "[n]ot that everything was better in the good ‘ole days, ... [b]ut you could get terrific original anthologies in spinner racks at the supermarket for under a buck ... like Groff Conklin's Minds Unleashed [with] great science fiction stories about 'the potential of human imagination and the range of strength of human intelligence' by Arthur C. Clarke, Theodore Sturgeon, Murray Leinster, Robert A. Heinlein, Poul Anderson, Eric Frank Russell, Isaac Asimov, William Tenn, and many others."

The anthology was also reviewed by P. Schuyler Miller in Analog Science Fiction -> Science Fact v. 78, no. 2, October 1966, Spider Robinson in Galaxy v. 37, no. 3, March 1976, and Bud Webster in The New York Review of Science Fiction v. 14, No. 6, February 2002.
