= 17 X Infinity =

1963 anthology edited by Groff Conklin

- Cover of first edition
- Editor: Groff Conklin
- Language: English
- Genre: Science fiction
- Publisher: Dell
- Publication date: 1963
- Publication place: United States
- Media type: Print (paperback)
- Pages: 272

17 X Infinity is an American anthology of science fiction short stories edited by Groff Conklin. It was first published in paperback by Dell in August 1963 and reprinted in April 1969. The first British edition was issued by Mayflower-Dell in 1964 and reprinted in 1965.

The book collects seventeen novelettes and short stories, plus one poem, by various authors, together with an introduction by the editor. The stories were previously published from 1909-1962 in various science fiction and other magazines.

== Contents ==
- "Introduction" (Groff Conklin)
- "The Simian Problem" (Hollis Alpert)
- "Strikebreaker" (Isaac Asimov)
- "Come Into My Cellar" (Ray Bradbury)
- "MS Fnd in a Lbry" (Hal Draper)
- "Cato the Martian" (Howard Fast)
- "The Spaceman Cometh" (Henry Gregor Felsen)
- "The Machine Stops" (E. M. Forster)
- "Frances Harkins" (Richard Goggin)
- "The Day They Got Boston" (Herbert Gold)
- "A-W-F, Unlimited" (Frank Herbert)
- "As Easy as A.B.C." (Rudyard Kipling)
- "MacDonough's Song" (poem) (Rudyard Kipling)
- "Silenzia" (Alan Nelson)
- "What to Do Until the Analyst Comes" (Frederik Pohl)
- "Short in the Chest" (Idris Seabright)
- "The Last of the Spode" (Evelyn E. Smith)
- "Never Underestimate" (Theodore Sturgeon)
- "Brooklyn Project" (William Tenn)
