= Great Detective Stories About Doctors =

1965 short story anthology

- Cover of first edition
- Editors: Groff and Noah D. Fabricant
- Language: English
- Genre: Science fiction
- Publisher: Collier Books
- Publication date: 1965
- Publication place: United States
- Media type: Print (paperback)
- Pages: 288
- OCLC: 08986281

Great Detective Stories About Doctors is an anthology of science fiction short stories edited by Groff Conklin and Noah D. Fabricant. It was first published in paperback by Collier Books in 1965 and was reprinted on a number of occasions. The two had previously collaborated on another anthology, Great Science Fiction About Doctors.

The book collects seventeen novelettes and short stories by various authors, together with an introduction by the editors.

== Contents ==
- "Introduction" (Groff Conklin and Noah D. Fabricant, M.D.)
- "Midnight in the Grand Babylon Hotel" (Arnold Bennett)
- "Murder in a Motel" (Lawrence G. Blochman)
- "The Doctor Takes a Case" (George Harmon Coxe)
- "The Adventure of the Blanched Soldier" (Arthur Conan Doyle)
- "The Gifts of Oblivion" (Dorothy Canfield Fisher)
- "The Testimony of Dr. Farnsworth" (Francis Leo Golden)
- "Miracle of the Fifteen Murderers" (Ben Hecht)
- "The Grave Grass Quivers" (MacKinlay Kantor)
- "The Eye" (Gerald Kersh)
- "The Seven Good Hunters" (Rufus King)
- "The Head" (Manuel Komroff)
- "The Other Side of the Curtain" (Helen McCloy)
- "The Memorial Hour" (William Miller and Robert Wade (as by Wade Miller))
- "The Man in the White Mask" (Alan E. Nourse)
- "The Mirrored Room" (Alan Rinehart)
- "The Cyprian Bees" (Anthony Wynne)
- "A Busman's Holiday" (Francis Brett Young )
