= 5 Unearthly Visions =

1965 short story anthology

- cover of first edition
- Editor: Groff Conklin
- Cover artist: Richard Powers
- Language: English
- Genre: Science fiction
- Publisher: Fawcett Gold Medal
- Publication date: 1965
- Publication place: United States
- Media type: Print (paperback)
- Pages: 175

5 Unearthly Visions is an anthology of science fiction short stories edited by Groff Conklin. It was first published in paperback by Fawcett Gold Medal in 1965 and reprinted in December 1967. The book has also been issued in German.

The book collects five novellas and novelettes by various science fiction authors. The stories were previously published from 1952 to 1957 in various science fiction and other magazines.

== Contents ==
- "Legwork" (Eric Frank Russell)
- "Conditionally Human" (Walter M. Miller, Jr.)
- "Stamped Caution" (Raymond Z. Gallun)
- "Dio" (Damon Knight)
- "Shadow World" (Clifford D. Simak)
