= 6 Great Short Novels of Science Fiction =

1954 short story anthology

- Cover of the first edition.
- Editor: Groff Conklin
- Illustrator: David Stone
- Cover artist: Richard Powers
- Language: English
- Genre: Science fiction
- Publisher: Dell Books
- Publication date: 1954
- Publication place: United States
- Media type: Print (paperback)
- Pages: 384

6 Great Short Novels of Science Fiction is an anthology of science fiction short stories edited by Groff Conklin. It was first published in paperback by Dell Books in 1954. The book should be distinct from his similarly titled later anthology, Six Great Short Science Fiction Novels.

The book collects six novellas and novelettes by various science fiction authors, together with an introduction by the editor. The stories were previously published from 1940-1952 in various science fiction and other magazines.

== Contents ==
- "Introduction" (Groff Conklin)
- "The Blast" (Stuart Cloete)
- "Coventry" (Robert A. Heinlein)
- "The Other World" (Murray Leinster)
- "Barrier" (Anthony Boucher)
- "Surface Tension" (James Blish)
- "Maturity" (Theodore Sturgeon)
