= Science Fiction Thinking Machines =

Short stories

- Cover of the first edition.
- Editor: Groff Conklin
- Language: English
- Genre: Science fiction
- Publisher: Vanguard Press
- Publication date: 1954
- Publication place: United States
- Media type: Print (hardcover)
- Pages: xiii, 367 pp.

Science Fiction Thinking Machines: Robots, Androids, Computers is an anthology of science fiction short stories edited by American anthologist Groff Conklin. It was first published in hardcover by Vanguard Press in May 1954. An abridged paperback edition titled, Selections from Science Fiction Thinking Machines was later published by Bantam Books in August 1955 and was reprinted in September 1964.

The book consists of twenty-two novelettes and short stories by various science fiction authors, together with an introduction and bibliography by the editor. The stories were previously published from 1899-1954, in various science fiction and other magazines.

== Contents ==
Note: stories also appearing in the abridged edition annotated A.

- "Introduction" (Groff Conklin)
- "Automata: I" (S. Fowler Wright)
- "Moxon's Master" (Ambrose Bierce)
- "Robbie" (Isaac Asimov) A
- "The Scarab" (Raymond Z. Gallun)
- "The Mechanical Bride" (Fritz Leiber)
- "Virtuoso" (Herbert Goldstone) A
- "Automata: II" (S. Fowler Wright)
- "Boomerang" (Eric Frank Russell) A
- "The Jester" (William Tenn) A
- "R. U. R." (Karel Čapek)
- "Skirmish" (Clifford D. Simak) A
- "Soldier Boy" (Michael Shaara)
- "Automata: III" (S. Fowler Wright)
- "Men Are Different" (Alan Bloch) A
- "Letter to Ellen" (Chan Davis) A
- "Sculptors of Life" (Wallace West)
- "The Golden Egg" (Theodore Sturgeon) A
- "Dead End" (Wallace Macfarlane) A
- "Answer" (Hal Clement)
- "Sam Hall" (Poul Anderson) A
- "Dumb Waiter" (Walter M. Miller Jr.) A
- "Problem for Emmy" (Robert Sherman Townes) A
- "Selected List of Tales About Robots, Androids, and Computers" (Groff Conklin)
