= Six Great Short Science Fiction Novels =

Fictional anthology

- cover of first edition
- Editor: Groff Conklin
- Cover artist: Richard Powers
- Language: English
- Genre: Science fiction
- Publisher: Dell
- Publication date: 1960
- Publication place: United States
- Media type: Print (paperback)
- Pages: 350

Six Great Short Science Fiction Novels is an anthology of science fiction short stories edited by Groff Conklin. It was first published in paperback by Dell in November 1960. The book should not be confused with his similarly titled earlier anthology, 6 Great Short Novels of Science Fiction.

The book collects six novellas and novelettes by various science fiction authors, together with an introduction by the editor. The stories were previously published from 1954 to 1960 in various science fiction and other magazines.

== Contents ==
- "Introduction" (Groff Conklin)
- "Galley Slave" (Isaac Asimov)
- "Project Nursemaid" (Judith Merril)
- "Final Gentleman" (Clifford D. Simak)
- "Chain Reaction" (Algis Budrys)
- "Rule Golden" (Damon Knight)
- "Incommunicado" (Katherine MacLean)
