= Hyperpilosity =

- Short story by L. Sprague de Camp
- Charles Schneeman's illustration of the story in Astounding Stories, Apr. 1938
- Country: United States
- Language: English
- Genre: Science fiction

Publication
- Published in: Astounding Stories
- Publisher: Street & Smith Publications, Inc.
- Media type: Print (Magazine)
- Publication date: April, 1938

"Hyperpilosity" is a science fiction story by American writer L. Sprague de Camp. It was first published in the magazine Astounding Stories for April, 1938, and first appeared in book form in the de Camp collection The Wheels of If and Other Science Fiction (Shasta, 1949; It later appeared in the anthologies Omnibus of Science Fiction (Crown, 1952), Science Fiction of the Thirties (Bobbs-Merrill, 1975), The Edward De Bono Science Fiction Collection, (Elmfield Press, 1976) and The Road to Science Fiction #2: From Wells to Heinlein (Mentor, 1979), as well as the magazine Fantastic Story Magazine (September, 1953) and the de Camp collection The Best of L. Sprague de Camp (Doubleday, 1978). In 2014 the story was shortlisted for the Retro Hugo Award for Best Short Story.

== Plot summary ==
In the Great Change of 1971, a virus infects humanity that causes everyone to grow fur all over their bodies. Initial reaction to the plague, dubbed "hyperpilosity" by the news media, is one of panic and horror. Various examples of the troubles resulting are told; the cast of the latest Tarzan movie, for instance, is reduced to frequent all-over shaving to be able to continue filming. There is a run on depilatory products.

An immense financial reward is offered to whoever can identify the condition's cause and develop a cure. Against the playing out of plague-fueled societal crisis and change, protagonist Pat Weiss relates how he and his employer, virology professor Oliveira, strive and ultimately succeed in doing just this. Alas for their dreams of riches; by the time their work is complete, mankind has become accustomed to the new state of things and moved on; those who end up profiting are not the scientists but purveyors of currycombs and such.

== Reception ==
Sam Moskowitz called the story "an entertaining episode on the sociological impact of the spontaneous growth of a furlike coating of hair on all men and women" though noting that "reader reception was only mild."

To science fiction historians Alexei and Cory Panshin the story exemplifies de Camp's reaction to the pessimistic attitudes toward change with which the genre was rife at the time; "for de Camp, mankind was by no means inevitably doomed. There was an obvious way forward, and that was for us to embrace nature, and not to rebel against it. ... Rather than resistance and denial, the course recommended by de Camp was adaptation to circumstances."

In 2014 the story was among the nominees for the 1939 Retro-Hugo Award for Best Short Story.
