= Great Science Fiction About Doctors =

Short story anthology

- cover of first edition
- Editors: Groff and Noah D. Fabricant
- Language: English
- Genre: Science fiction
- Publisher: Collier Books
- Publication date: 1963
- Publication place: United States
- Media type: Print (paperback)
- Pages: 412

Great Science Fiction About Doctors is an anthology of science fiction short stories edited by Groff Conklin and Noah D. Fabricant, M.D. It was first published in paperback by Collier Books in 1963, and was reprinted in 1965, 1966, and 1970. The two later collaborated on a second anthology, Great Detective Stories About Doctors.

The book collects eighteen novelettes and short stories by various authors, together with a general introduction and short introductions to each story by the editors. Several of the stories are by as well as about doctors. They were previously published from 1844-1959 in various magazines.

== Contents ==
- "Introduction" (Noah D. Fabricant, M.D. and Groff Conklin)
- "The Man Without an Appetite" (Miles J. Breuer, M.D.)
- "Out of the Cradle, Endlessly Orbiting" (Arthur C. Clarke)
- "The Brothers" (Clifton Dance, Jr., M.D.)
- "The Great Keinplatz Experiment" (Arthur Conan Doyle, M.D.)
- "Compound B" (David Harold Fink, M.D.)
- "Rappaccini's Daughter" (Nathaniel Hawthorne)
- "The Psychophonic Nurse" (David H. Keller, M.D.)
- "The Little Black Bag" (C. M. Kornbluth)
- "Ribbon in the Sky" (Murray Leinster)
- "Mate in Two Moves" (Winston K. Marks)
- "Bedside Manner" (William Morrison)
- "The Shopdropper" (Alan Nelson)
- "Family Resemblance" (Alan E. Nourse, M.D.)
- "Facts in the Case of M. Valdemar" (Edgar Allan Poe)
- "Emergency Operation" (Arthur Porges)
- "A Matter of Ethics" (J. R. Shango)
- "Bolden's Pets" (F. L. Wallace)
- "Expedition Mercy" (J. A. Winter, M.D.)
