= Seven Trips Through Time and Space =

1968 anthology edited by Groff Conklin

- Cover of the first edition.
- Editor: Groff Conklin
- Language: English
- Genre: Science fiction
- Publisher: Fawcett Gold Medal
- Publication date: 1968
- Publication place: United States
- Media type: Print (paperback)
- Pages: 256

Seven Trips Through Time and Space is an anthology of science fiction short stories edited by Groff Conklin. It was first published in paperback by Fawcett Gold Medal in 1968. The first British edition was issued by Coronet in February 1969 and reprinted in 1972 and 1973, and the first hardcover edition (also in Britain) was issued by White Lion in 1972.

The book collects seven novelettes and short stories by various science fiction authors, together with an introduction by the editor. The stories were previously published from 1958-1967 in various science fiction and other magazines.

== Contents ==
- "Introduction" (Groff Conklin)
- "Flatlander" (Larry Niven)
- "The Crime and the Glory of Commander Suzdal" (Cordwainer Smith)
- "Overproof" (Jonathan Blake MacKenzie)
- "Poor Planet" (J. T. McIntosh)
- "Shamar's War" (Kris Neville)
- "The Tactful Saboteur" (Frank Herbert)
- "Ministry of Disturbance" (H. Beam Piper)
