= Dimension 4 =

Anthology of science fiction short stories

- Cover of first edition.
- Editor: Groff Conklin
- Cover artist: Jack Gaughan
- Language: English
- Genre: Science fiction
- Publisher: Pyramid Books
- Publication date: 1964
- Publication place: United States
- Media type: Print (paperback)
- Pages: 159

Dimension 4 is an anthology of science fiction short stories edited by Groff Conklin. It was first published in paperback by Pyramid Books in February 1964.

The book collects four novelettes by various science fiction authors. The stories were previously published from 1942-1958 in the science fiction magazines Astounding Science Fiction and Nebula Science Fiction.

== Contents ==
- "Won't You Walk?" (Theodore Sturgeon)
- "Sense of Proportion" (E. C. Tubb)
- "Trojan Horse Laugh" (John D. MacDonald)
- "Some Day We'll Find You" (Cleve Cartmill)
