= Five-Odd =

1964 anthology edited by Groff Conklin

- Cover of first edition
- Editor: Groff Conklin
- Cover artist: John Schoenherr
- Language: English
- Genre: Science fiction
- Publisher: Pyramid Books
- Publication date: 1964
- Publication place: United States
- Media type: Print (paperback)
- Pages: 188
- OCLC: 05270903
- Dewey Decimal: 813.5
- LC Class: PS648.S3 C66556

Five-Odd is an anthology of science fiction novelettes edited by Groff Conklin. It was first published in paperback by Pyramid Books in August 1964; it was reprinted in June 1971. The first British edition was published under the alternate title Possible Tomorrows in hardcover by Sidgwick & Jackson in June 1972; a paperback edition was issued by Coronet under the same title in September 1973. It was later gathered together with the Donald A. Wollheim-edited anthology Trilogy of the Future into the omnibus anthology Science Fiction Special 9 (Sidgwick & Jackson, April 1974).

The book collects one novella, three novelettes and one short story by various science fiction authors, together with an introduction by the editor. The stories were previously published from 1954-1961 in various science fiction magazines.

== Contents ==
- "Introduction" (Groff Conklin)
- "The Dead Past" (Isaac Asimov)
- "Something Strange" (Kingsley Amis)
- "Unit" (J. T. McIntosh)
- "Gone Fishing" (James H. Schmitz)
- "Big Ancestor" (F. L. Wallace)
