= William J. Fielding =

William John Fielding (April 10, 1886 in Wharton, New Jersey–1973) was an American author and sexologist.

== Bibliography ==
- Pebbles from Parnassus comprising rhymes of revolt and flitting fancies (1917)
- Psycho-analysis : the key to human behavior (1920)
- Sanity in sex (1920)
- The caveman within us (1922)
- What every boy should know (1924)
- What every married man should know (1924)
- What every young man should know (1924)
- Teeth and mouth hygiene (1924 or 1925)
- Homo-sexual Life (1925)
- Man's sexual life (1925)
- Dual and multiple personality (1926)
- Sex and the Love Life (1927)
- Boccaccio : lover and chronicler of love (1930)
- Strange customs of courtship and marriage (1942)
