= Unhuman Sacrifice =

- Short story by Katherine MacLean
- Country: USA
- Genre: Science fiction

Publication
- Published in: Astounding Science Fiction
- Media type: Print
- Publication date: November 1958

"Unhuman Sacrifice" is a short story by the American writer Katherine MacLean. It was first published in Astounding Science Fiction in November 1958, and has appeared in several anthologies.

In the story, a space ship brings a missionary and skeptical crew members to an alien planet; they get to understand unexpected features of the inhabitants' lives.

== Story summary ==
The space ship of a missionary society has landed on a planet, and the Reverend Winton is preaching to the natives, by means of a translator machine. Henderson, who is the navigator and chief engineer, and Charlie, the junior engineer, are scornful. Henderson thinks it is dangerous to interfere with the inhabitants, and that the machine does not yet know their language. The natives regard the box (the translator), which says a few disjointed words in their language, with curiosity.

To improve the translator's understanding of the language, Henderson and Charlie interview the natives, such as Spet, who talks politely to his interviewer, thinking he is the ghost of a relative. Spet later tells Winton, using the improved power of the translator, that when the rains come, young people like himself, in order to become adults, must hang upside down; some die, and the rest become long and thin. (Parts of the story are seen from Spet's point of view; he regards the coming ordeal with calm acceptance.) Winton, appalled, tells Henderson that they should stop the practice, but Henderson, assuming that Winton is always wrong, disagrees. Henderson is shocked when Spet describes the procedure to him.

The rains come and Spet has been hung upside down from a tree by the elders. He is cut down by Henderson and Charlie, and is taken to the ship, which is in a riverbed that until now was dry. Near the ramp of the ship. as the water rises, Spet "felt his feet sending roots down into the mud.... As the water rushed into his lungs, the rooted sea-creature that was the forgotten adult stage of Spet's species began its thoughtless pseudo-plant existence...."

== Reception ==
In New Maps of Hell: A Survey of Science Fiction (1960), Kingsley Amis commented: "I take this, not too fancifully I hope, as a justifiably horrifying little allegory of what you can do to people when you interfere with them for their own good.... [A] satire on organised religion, such as the story patently is, has its own place."

It was included in the anthology A Century of Science Fiction (1962), editied by Damon Knight; in his introduction to the story, Knight wrote that it is "a subtle interweaving of anthropology, social comment, depth psychology, irony, deadpan humor....What the whole story means is not expressible in a formula or a plot outline: it hits you below the level on which simple declarative sentences are put together".
