= Seven Come Infinity =

- Cover of first edition
- Editor: Groff Conklin
- Cover artist: Richard Powers
- Language: English
- Genre: Science fiction
- Publisher: Fawcett Gold Medal
- Publication date: 1966
- Publication place: United States
- Media type: Print (paperback)
- Pages: 288

Seven Come Infinity is an anthology of science fiction short stories edited by Groff Conklin. It was first published in paperback by Fawcett Gold Medal in 1966. The first British edition was published by Coronet in 1967.

The book collects seven novellas, novelettes and short stories by various science fiction authors, together with a preface by the editor. The stories were previously published from 1950 to 1960 in various science fiction and other magazines.

== Contents ==
- "Preface" (Groff Conklin)
- "The Golden Bugs" (Clifford D. Simak)
- "Special Feature" (Charles V. de Vet)
- "Panic Button" (Eric Frank Russell)
- "Discontinuity" (Raymond F. Jones)
- "The Corianis Disaster" (Murray Leinster)
- "The Servant Problem" (William Tenn)
- "Rite of Passage" (Chad Oliver)
