= Another Part of the Galaxy =

1966 anthology edited by Groff Conklin

- Cover of the first edition.
- Editor: Groff Conklin
- Language: English
- Genre: Science fiction
- Publisher: Fawcett Gold Medal
- Publication date: 1966
- Publication place: United States
- Media type: Print (paperback)
- Pages: 224

Another Part of the Galaxy is an anthology of science fiction short stories edited by Groff Conklin. It was first published in paperback by Fawcett Gold Medal in 1966.

The book collects six novelettes and short stories by various science fiction authors, together with a general introduction and brief introductions to each story by the editor. The stories were previously published from 1953-1959 in various science fiction and other magazines.

== Contents ==
- "Introduction: 'Act III. Scene V. Another Part of the Forest'" (Groff Conklin)
- "The Red Hills of Summer" (Edgar Pangborn)
- "Big Sword" (Paul Ash)
- "First Lady" (J. T. McIntosh)
- "Insidekick" (J. F. Bone)
- "The Live Coward" (Poul Anderson)
- "Still Life" (Eric Frank Russell)
