= Morton Klass =

American anthropologist (1927-2001)

- Born: June 24, 1927; Brooklyn
- Died: April 28, 2001 (aged 73); Washington Heights
- Occupation: Anthropologist, university teacher
- Employer: Barnard College (1965–)

Morton Klass (June 24, 1927 – April 28, 2001) was an American anthropologist known for his studies of caste and kinship in India, as well as his work on religion and culture among the Bhojpuri-speaking Indo-Caribbean population.

Klass completed his doctoral degree at Columbia University, where he later taught anthropology for many years. He conducted extensive fieldwork in both India and the Caribbean, beginning with Trinidad from 1957 to 1958. From 1962 to 1963, he began Indian studies at Columbia University under the direction of Conrad M. Arensberg in West Bengal. With a sponsorship from the Social Science Research Council, Klass returned to India from 1972 to 1973 for a second period of study.

Klass wrote widely on the anthropology of religion, contributing to understanding of ritual, belief, and religious change. He died in 2001.

== Publications ==
- East Indians in Trinidad: A Study of Cultural Persistence (1961)
- The Kinds of Mankind: An Introduction to Race and Racism (1971)
- From Field to Factory: Community Structure and Industrialization in West Bengal (1978)
- Caste: The Emergence of the South Asian Social System (1980)
- Singing with Sai Baba: The Politics of Revitalization in Trinidad (1991)
- Ordered Universes: Approaches To The Anthropology Of Religion (1995)
- Across The Boundaries Of Belief: Contemporary Issues In The Anthropology Of Religion (1999)
- Mind Over Mind: The Anthropology and Psychology of Spirit Possession (2003), posthumous publication
