= Charles Muñoz =

American writer and publisher (1926–2018)

Charles Carroll Muñoz
- Born: July 2, 1926; Bronx, New York, U.S.
- Died: February 22, 2018 (aged 91); Doylestown, Pennsylvania, U.S.
- Occupations: Novelist; short story author; poet
- Writing career
- Genres: mainstream fiction, science fiction, poetry

Charles Carroll Muñoz (July 2, 1926 – February 22, 2018) was an American poet, fiction writer and publisher. He wrote as Charles Muñoz and under the pseudonyms T. P. Caravan and TP Caravan.

== Life and career ==
Muñoz served as a WWII navy aerial gunner in Grumman TBF Avenger torpedo bombers. After the war he worked as a United States Merchant Marine radio officer, sailing on freighters, tankers, and passenger ships, and later for several years on munitions ships bound for duty in the wars in Korea and Vietnam. He came ashore for good and married the former Bernardine Martin. For a while, he entertained himself as an explorer of caves, a walker in the desert, and a writer on arctic survival for the Air Force. He then chose a more formal profession, becoming vice president of Springhouse Corporation, a publisher of books and magazines.

== Writing ==
Muñoz was a specialist in eighteenth-century literature, a member of the Gunroom of HMS Surprise, a novelist, a science fiction writer, and especially a poet. He attended Columbia University and wrote his masters thesis on English poet Edward Young in 1953. Stowaway, his contemporary/mimetic sea novel, was published in 1957. His science fiction and fantasy short stories appeared in the 1950s and 1960s under the pseudonym T. P. Caravan. One ("Random Sample," 1953) was recently reprinted in the anthology Worst Contact (Baen Books, 2016). Muñoz's varied experiences form the background that enriches his poems, which are often conventionally suburban in their location but wildly mythic in their subtext.

Muñoz was poet laureate of Bucks County, PA, spent five years as poetry editor of Jewish Spectator magazine, and became the official list bard to the Gunroom of HMS Surprise. His poems earned four nominations for the Pushcart Prize.

== Bibliography ==
=== Novels ===
- Stowaway (Random House, 1957)

=== Thesis ===
- Edward Young and his Search for Patronage (Columbia University, unpublished, 1953)

=== Short stories (all as by T. P. Caravan) ===
- "Happy Solution" (1952)
- "Last Minute" (1952)
- "Fish Story" (1952)
- "Dinosaur Day" (1953)
- "Random Sample" (1953)
- "The Cold, Cold Grave" (1953)
- "A Stitch in Time" (1954) (with Howth Castle)
- "The Soluble Scientist" (1954)
- "Problem ???????????? in ? Geometry" (1954)
- "Fission Story" (1955)
- "The Shoemaker of Lan" (1955)
- "Moonshine" (1955)
- "The Immortality of Professor Bickerstaffe" (1956)
- "The Censors: A Sad Allegory" (1963)
- "The Court of Tartary" (1963)
- "Blind Date" (1965)

=== Poetry collections ===
- Fragments of a Myth - Modern Poems on Ancient Themes (Time Being Books, 2001)
