= Sex and the Love Life =

1927 book by William J. Fielding

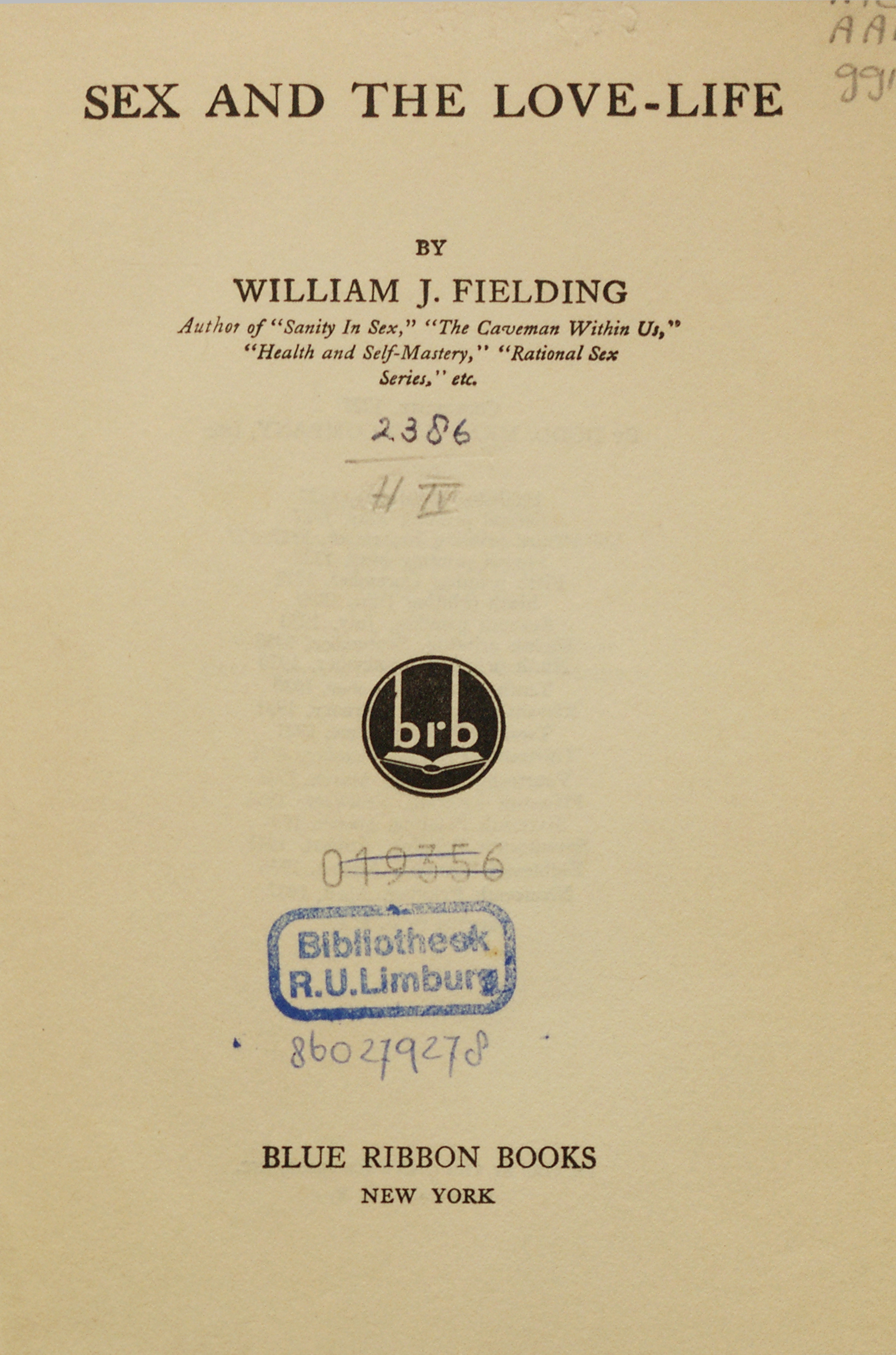
- Title page of the book
- Author: William J. Fielding
- Language: English
- Genre: Non-fiction
- Publication date: 1927
- Publication place: United States

Sex and the Love Life by the American author William J. Fielding is a non-fictional book published in 1927 in New York. It deals with the contemporary understanding of sexuality and its relation to the love life in many fields of life.

The book consists of 14 chapters and a glossary in which all biological, sexual and medical terms that are discussed in the book itself are defined and explained. The first chapter gives an introduction to different conceptions of the function of sex and mentions cultural influences on these conceptions. Chapter Two deals with the Development of the Love Life and focuses especially on the sex life of the child. Besides that, Man’s and Woman’s Sexual Nature are described in Chapter three and four respectively, whereby biological aspects of the male and female reproductive systems are elaborated on in detail. In the fifth chapter the author gives advice about the Preparation of Marriage and in the sixth Chapter Sex Hygiene in Marriage is the topic. Hygiene is not referring solely to personal hygiene but rather to how sexual intercourse can be used to improve marital happiness and satisfaction. Women’s Love Rights are presented in the following chapter (chapter 8) in which the (at that time) novel notion is described which says that women also have the right to enjoy sexuality. In chapter nine the Birth Control in Relation to the Love Life is being addressed and Chapter nine gives information about The Hygiene in Pregnancy (again not referring solely to personal hygiene). Chapter 10 deals with The Menopause and its symptoms. The following two chapters (11 and 12) present different kinds of Sexual Disorders of Women and Men, respectively and Chapter 13 depicts Venereal Diseases that are being transmitted by sexual intercourse. The last Chapter 14 gives information on the relationship between The Parent and the Child with special focus on sex education.

== Structure ==
A detailed table of contents is present on the first few pages of the book. Important keywords that come up during the chapter are also mentioned alongside the table of contents. The exact outline appears also at the beginning of each chapter respectively. Although the chapters do indeed contain sub-headings, they are not reflected exclusively in the outline at the beginning of the chapter (reference to image). The nine-page glossary (reference to image) at the end of the book gives approximately 180 short definitions of different loan words that may not be familiar to a reader that has no expertise in medicine or biology (ordered alphabetically). Following the glossary, an index is contained at the very end.

== Content ==
=== Chapter 2: Development of the Love Life ===
In chapter 2 of his book, Fielding describes the Development of the Love Life in successive stages from childhood up until adolescence in which the child firstly expresses auto-erotic feelings towards itself. In later development these feelings shift towards a significant other person, usually in the family until the erotic attachment is transferred upon someone outside the family and according to Fielding, usually someone of the opposite sex. It is pronounced that these erotic feelings in the beginning of childhood appear unconsciously and that they are expressed in the pleasure of sucking or rubbing own body parts. Later on, memories of those sexual desires will not be present due to repression. Fielding advises to encourage sublimation in children to channel their sexual energy "to outlets that have cultural and social value". It is the context of sublimation where Fielding quotes Freud whose opinion was very influential in the 1920s and which can be clearly seen throughout the whole book. Another example would be Fielding's explanation of how adolescents start to become attracted to the opposite sex. According to him, boys will be attracted to women because "the mother is identified with the good things and comforts of life" and "a woman tends to marry a man resembling her father" because "the girl child shows a disposition [...] to discriminate in expressing her affections in favour of the father". The last part of this second chapter depicts so-called Aberrations of the Love-Life in which, besides fetichism, anti-fetiches, exhibitionism, sadism and masochism, masochism and hermaphroditism, also homosexuality is being mentioned which would appear due to "abnormal home conditions" and a pre-occupation with the same-sexed parent.

=== Chapter 9: Birth Control in Relation to the Love Life ===
This chapter deals mainly with the contemporary misunderstanding of contraception in general. All too often it was equalized with abortion and murder of an embryo. Fielding begins with enlightening the reader and explains the advantages of contraception, one of which concerning a moral aspect: "a practice which increases marital happiness, which assures people of greater economic security [...] and which permits more extensive educational and cultural advantages to the fewer and better children that are born [...] is a good practice". Furthermore, he argues that the fear of pregnancy (as many women experienced at that time) would lead to marital disharmony and that contraceptive methods should be used to establish an unstressed atmosphere between married couples. Fielding also criticizes the church's position towards contraception at that time by saying that "the church [...] has been and still is the most powerful influence against the principle of parenthood by choice instead of accident". The institutional church would be ignorant of the benefits that contraception offers to the people. The position that is still held by the Catholic Church, namely that "Contraception is wrong because it’s a deliberate violation of the design God built into the human race, often referred to as "natural law." The natural law purpose of sex is procreation" is countered by Fielding as well. He states that humans with their increasing knowledge and skills are already compassing the natural laws, for example by "using artificial light and heat, wearing clothes, [...] and doing a thousand odd other things that are commonplace and proper in our civilization [but are] unnatural". He concludes that the view of contraceptive methods must change in society so that the physiological, psychological and social benefits of contraception can be experienced by every individual.

== The 1920s and Sexuality ==
The 1920s, also known as the Roaring Twenties, depict a time of great economic prosperity after the First World War, especially in America. Many people were still conservative about the topic of sexuality, especially due to poor knowledge about sexuality and their own bodies but also because sexual intercourse not intended for reproduction was depicted as sinful by the church. However, the role of women changed: within or after WWI women had to go to work to earn money for their families while their husbands left to join the army which led to a "near-equality in making money". Women got more and more self-confident and independent which also led to a change in dating and sexual behaviour, away from conservatism and taboos towards more open-mindedness regarding their sexual behaviour. This shift is also promoted by Fielding in his book "Sex and the Love Life".

=== Homosexuality ===
Homosexuality in the late 1920s was slowly being more accepted. However, this did not last a long time and "Homosexuals received a level of acceptance that was not seen again until the 1960s". This acceptance was mainly due to the increasing mentioning of homosexuality in entertaining media such as films or songs (see also LGBT History). Nevertheless, in the late 1930s homosexuality was made illegal and declared as a mental illness. It was not until 1973 where "the American Psychiatric Association removed the diagnosis of "homosexuality" from the second edition of its Diagnostic and Statistical Manual (DSM)".

=== Contraception ===
In the early 20th century contraception was increasingly favoured and accepted (see History of Birth Control) although it was still subject to the discussion if sexual intercourse was meant solely for reproduction or if it was also part of the normal love life between spouses. In his book Sex and the Love Life, Fielding clearly takes a more liberal view and promotes contraceptive methods as they would increase marital happiness and harmony.

== See also ==
- LGBT history
