= The Fun They Had =

1951 Short story by Isaac Asimov

- Short story by Isaac Asimov
- Country: United States
- Language: English
- Genre: Science fiction

Publication
- Published in: Boys and Girls Page
- Publication type: Periodical
- Media type: Print (Newspaper, Magazine, Hardback & Paperback)
- Publication date: 1 December 1951

"The Fun They Had" is a science fiction story by American writer Isaac Asimov. It first appeared in a children's newspaper in 1951 and was reprinted in the February 1954 issue of The Magazine of Fantasy and Science Fiction, Earth Is Room Enough (1957), 50 Short Science Fiction Tales (1960), and The Best of Isaac Asimov (1973).

Written as a personal favor for a friend, "The Fun They Had" became "probably the biggest surprise of my literary career", Asimov wrote in 1973. He reported that it had been reprinted more than 30 times with more being planned. It is about computerized homeschooling, and what children miss out on by not being in school together. He surmised that the story was popular with children because "the kids would get a bang out of the irony."

== Summary ==
Set in the year 2157, when children learn individually at home using a mechanical (robotic) teacher, the story tells of 11-year-old Margie Jones, whose neighbour Tommy finds a "real" book in the attic of his house. This reminds Margie of the stories her grandfather used to tell about the earlier school days. The book tells about a time when children used to learn in a group of the same age of students in large schools that were not merely designated rooms in private houses as in Margie and Tommy's time. Margie and Tommy discuss what it must have been like to study together with a real person as a teacher, and though at first Margie is sceptical about the notion, by the end of the story she daydreams while sitting on the chair before the mechanical teacher about "the fun they had".
