= G. C. Edmondson =

American novelist

G. C. Edmondson was the working name of science fiction author Garry Edmonson (full name "José Mario Garry Ordoñez Edmondson y Cotton") (October 11, 1922 in Washington state – December 14, 1995 in San Diego, California). According to the obituary published in Locus Magazine, Edmondson was born in Washington state During World War II he served as a U. S. Marine.

Although generally called a science fiction writer, he wrote Westerns using the names Kelly P. Gast, J. B. Masterson, and Jack Logan. As he could also speak six languages he did translating work as well. His science fiction career began during 1955 with a story in the magazine Astounding. He later produced several novels which gained some note for their interest in time travel and Latin America. Several writers, including Gardner Dozois, tend to consider him as a neglected author.

== Bibliography ==
=== Novels ===
- The Ship That Sailed the Time Stream (1965) Nebula Award nominee for Best Novel
- Chapayeca also published as Blue Face (1972)
- T.H.E.M. (1974)
- The Aluminum Man (1975)
- The Man Who Corrupted Earth (1980)
- To Sail the Century Sea (1981)

==== Novels written with C. M. Kotlan ====
- The Takeover (1984)
- The Cunningham Equations (1986)
- The Black Magician (1986)
- Maximum Effort (1987)

=== Collections ===
- Stranger Than You Think (1965)

== External resources ==
- G. C. Edmondson at the Internet Speculative Fiction Database
- Biographical information at George C. Willick's SPACEFLIGHT
