= Miles Breuer =

American physician and writer

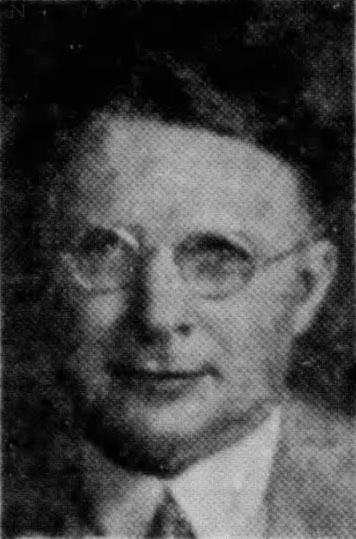
Miles J. Breuer

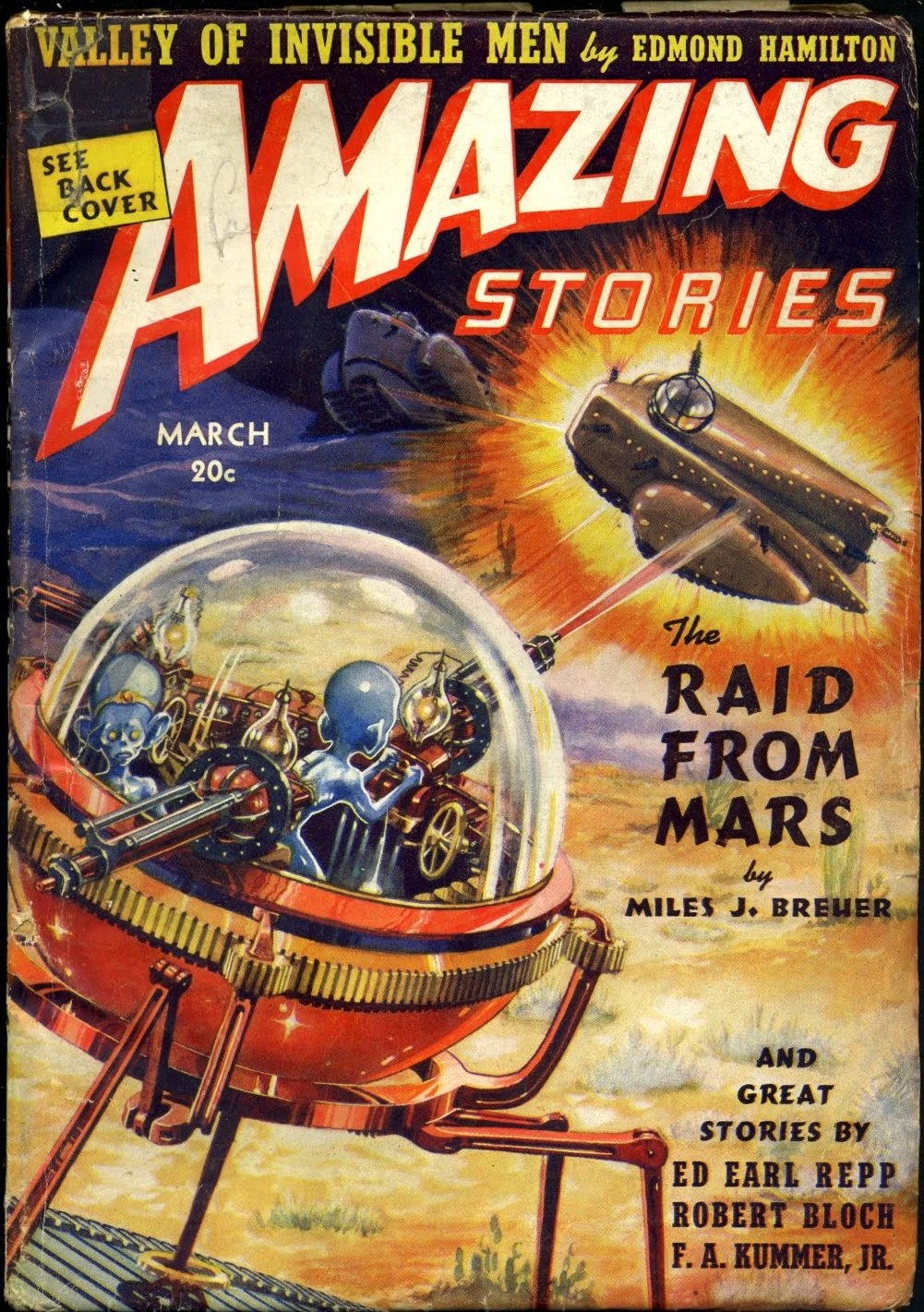
Breuer's "The Raid from Mars" was the cover story in the March 1939 issue of Amazing Stories

Miles John Breuer (January 3, 1889 – October 14, 1945) was an American physician and science fiction writer of Czech origin. Although he had published elsewhere outside of the genre publications since the early 20th century, he is considered the part of the first generation of writers to appear regularly in the pulp science fiction magazines, publishing his first story, "The Man with the Strange Head", in the January 1927 issue of Amazing Stories. His best known works are "The Gostak and the Doshes" (1930) and two stories written jointly with Jack Williamson, "The Girl from Mars" (1929) and The Birth of a New Republic (1931).

== Early life and medical career ==
Miles J. Breuer was born in Chicago, in 1889, to Charles (Karel) and Barbara Breuer, Czech immigrants from the Austro-Hungarian Empire. The family moved to Nebraska in 1893 while Charles pursued a medical degree at Creighton University in Omaha. Miles grew up in the Czech community of Crete, Nebraska. He graduated from Crete High School in 1906.

He attended the University of Texas, where he earned a master's degree in 1911. After earning a medical degree in 1915 from Rush Medical College, which was then at the University of Chicago, Breuer returned to Nebraska to join his father's medical practice. In 1916 Miles married Julia Strejc. The couple had three children together, Rosalie, Stanley, and Mildred.

During World War I Miles Breuer served for twenty months in France as a first lieutenant in the Army Medical Corps. Rejoining his father's medical practice after the war, Breuer contributed frequent medical articles to Czech-language newspapers, as well as a monthly health column in the country's largest Czech-language agricultural monthly. In 1925 he published a handbook called Index of Physiotherapeutic Technic, cataloging a variety of methods for physical therapy.

Breuer suffered a nervous breakdown in December 1942. Shortly afterward he moved to Los Angeles, where he continued his medical practice until 1945. He died that year after a brief illness.

== Writing career ==
Breuer's first published works of fiction appeared as early as in 1908 in various English-language (e.g. The University of Texas Magazine, and early monthly pulp 10 Story Book) as well as US-based Czech-language publications (e.g. Amerikán Národní Kalendář almanac, monthly Bratrský věstník). Breuer had long been interested in scientific romances, particularly those by H. G. Wells. When Hugo Gernsback founded the first science fiction magazine, Amazing Stories, Breuer began submitting stories, publishing his first, "The Man with the Strange Head", in the January 1927 issue. Only a few months earlier, this story was published in Chicago in Czech as "Muž se zvláštní hlavou" in the yearly Czech-language Amerikán Národní Kalendář almanac for 1927.

Over the next fifteen years Breuer published two novels, thirty-six shorter stories, and several other items for science fiction magazines, including collaborations with Jack Williamson and Clare Winger Harris. "The Fitzgerald Contraction" and "The Time Valve" were among the earliest science fiction stories exploring the time dilation effect. A great majority were published in Amazing Stories (a monthly) and Amazing Stories Quarterly. Of these stories, at least a dozen were previously published in various non-genre publications, either in English, or Czech, or both languages.

Several of Breuer's stories have been included in anthologies. In the early 21st century, Michael R. Page of the University of Nebraska edited a collection, The Man with the Strange Head and Other Early Science Fiction Stories (2008), comprising ten stories, the novel Paradise and Iron, and Breuer's editorial essay "The Future of Scientifiction". This book only covered Breuer's literary career in SF pulps. It was not until 2019, when his writing in Czech as well as early texts in English were discovered and presented by Jaroslav Olša, Jr. in the Czech SF monthly XB-1 (November 2020). Its abbreviated version is a chapbook The Amazing Breuer. Early Czech-American Science Fiction Author Miloslav (Miles) J. Breuer (1889-1945) (2020). – chapbook available online. Jaroslav Olša, Jr. also wrote Czech-language book Miloslav (Miles) J. Breuer. Česko-americký spisovatel u zrodu moderní science fiction (Miloslav /Miles/ J. Breuer: Czech-American Writer at the Birth of Modern Science Fiction.) Praha: Nová vlna 2023, which also includes three Breuer's SF short stories originally written in Czech. Expanded version of the Czech-language book is recently published Olša's monograph Dreaming of Autonomous Vehicles: Miloslav (Miles) J. Breuer, Czech-American Writer, and the Birth of Science Fiction Joshua Tree: Space Cowboy 2025, which also includes unknown early 1924 version of Breuer's pulp magazine novel Paradise and Iron (1930).

Jack Williamson has described Breuer as "among the first and best of the amateurs whose work Gernsback began to print." Walter Gillings said that Breuer wrote "some of the most intriguing tales that appeared in the early volumes of Amazing Stories ". John Clute described his work as crudely written, but intelligent and noted for new ideas.

== Works by Miles J. Breuer ==
This list is limited to speculative fiction as cataloged by the Internet Speculative Fiction Database. For Breuer as author or co-author, ISFDB lists the following one 1916 story and 44 items published from 1927 to 1942. It also catalogs ten letters to Amazing Stories and one to Wonder Stories, all 1927–31, and one 1930 illustration. Bibliography of all known Breuer's short stories and poems (including those published in Czech-American press) is included in monograph Dreaming of Autonomous Vehicles: Miloslav (Miles) J. Breuer: Czech-American Writer and the Birth of Science Fiction (Space Cowboy Books - Nová vlna 2025) by Jaroslav Olša, Jr.

=== Short stories (only those listed in ISFDB) ===
- "The Man Without an Appetite" (Czech language, Bratrský věstník, 1916), Great Science Fiction About Doctors, ed. Noah D. Fabricant and Groff Conklin, Collier Books, 1963.
- "The Man with the Strange Head", Amazing Stories, January 1927. Reprinted in Big Book of Science Fiction, ed. Groff Conklin, Crown, 1950; Amazing Science Fiction Anthology: The Wonder Years 1926 - 1935; ed. Martin H. Greenberg, TSR, 1987; The Man with the Strange Head and Other Early Science Fiction Stories, ed. Michael R. Page, University of Nebraska Press, 2008.
- "The Stone Cat", Amazing Stories, September 1927.
- "The Riot at Sanderac", Amazing Stories, December 1927.
- "The Puzzle Duel", Amazing Stories Quarterly, Winter 1928.
- "The Appendix and the Spectacles", Amazing Stories, December 1928. Reprinted in The Science Fiction Galaxy, ed. Groff Conklin, Perma Books, 1950; The Mathematical Magpie, ed. Clifton Fadiman, Simon & Schuster, 1962; The Man with the Strange Head.
- "The Captured Cross-Section", Amazing Stories, February 1929. Reprinted in Avon Fantasy Reader #12, ed. Donald A. Wollheim, Avon Novels, 1950; Fantasia Mathematica, ed. Clifton Fadiman, Simon & Schuster, 1958; Other Dimensions, ed. Robert Silverberg, Hawthorn Books, 1973.
- "Buried Treasure", Amazing Stories, April 1929.
- "The Book of Worlds", Amazing Stories, July 1929. Reprinted in Avon Science Fiction Reader #2, ed. Donald A. Wollheim, Avon Novels, 1951; Fantastic Stories, April 1969; New Horizons: Yesterday's Portraits of Tomorrow, ed. August Derleth, Arkham House, 1999.
- "Rays and Men", Amazing Stories Quarterly, Summer 1929.
- "The Girl from Mars" (with Jack Williamson), Science Fiction Series #1, November 1929. Reprinted in The Early Williamson, Jack Williamson, Doubleday, 1975; The Metal Man and Others: The Collected Stories of Jack Williamson, Volume One, Jack Williamson, Haffner, 1999.
- "A Baby on Neptune" (with Clare Winger Harris), Amazing Stories, December 1929. Reprinted in Away from the Here and Now, Clare Winger Harris, Dorrance, 1947; Flight into Space, ed. Donald A. Wollheim, Fredrick Fell, 1950; Gosh! Wow! (Sense of Wonder) Science Fiction, ed. Forrest J. Ackerman, Bantam, 1982.
- "The Fitzgerald Contraction", Science Wonder Stories, January 1930. Reprinted in Startling Stories, January 1942.
- "The Hungry Guinea Pig", Amazing Stories, January 1930. Reprinted in Science Fiction Adventures in Mutation, ed. Groff Conklin, Vanguard Press, 1955; Amazing Stories, October 1961; Science Fiction Classics Annual, 1970; The Ascent of Wonder: The Evolution of Hard SF eds. David Hartwell and Kathryn Cramer, Tor, 1994.
- "The Gostak and the Doshes", Amazing Stories, March 1930. Reprinted in Avon Fantasy Reader #10, ed. Donald A. Wollheim, Avon Novels, 1949; Science Fiction Adventures in Dimension, ed. Groff Conklin, Vanguard Press, 1953; Great Science Fiction by Scientists, ed. Groff Conklin, Collier Books, 1962; Science Fiction Classics, Fall 1967; The Arbor House Treasury of Science Fiction Masterpieces, eds. Robert Silverberg and Martin H. Greenberg, Arbor House, 1983; Amazing Stories: 60 Years of the Best Science Fiction, eds. Isaac Asimov and Martin H. Greenberg, TSR, 1985; Great Tales of Science Fiction, eds. Robert Silverberg and Martin H. Greenberg, Galahad Books, 1988; The Man with the Strange Head.
- "The Driving Power", Amazing Stories, July 1930.
- "The Time Valve", Wonder Stories, July 1930.
- "The Inferiority Complex", Amazing Stories, September 1930.
- "A Problem in Communication", Astounding Stories of Super-Science, September 1930. Reprinted in The Man with the Strange Head.
- "On Board the Martian Liner", Amazing Stories, March 1931. Reprinted in The Man with the Strange Head.
- "The Time Flight", Amazing Stories July 1931.
- "The Demons of Rhadi-Mu", Amazing Stories Quarterly, Fall 1931.
- "Mechanocracy", Amazing Stories, April 1932. Reprinted in The Man with the Strange Head.
- "The Einstein See-Saw", Astounding Stories, April 1932. Reprinted in Avon Fantasy Reader #15, ed. Donald A. Wollheim, Avon Novels, 1951.
- "The Perfect Planet", Amazing Stories, May 1932.
- "The Finger of the Past", Amazing Stories, November 1932. Reprinted in The Man with the Strange Head.
- "The Strength of the Weak", Amazing Stories, December 1933.
- "Millions for Defense", Amazing Stories, March 1935. Reprinted in The Man with the Strange Head.
- "Mars Colonizes", Marvel Tales, Summer 1935. Reprinted in The Garden of Fear and Other Stories, ed. William L. Crawford, Crawford Publication, 1949; The Man with the Strange Head.
- "The Chemistry Murder Case", Amazing Stories, October 1935.
- "Mr. Dimmitt Seeks Redress", Amazing Stories, August 1936. Reprinted in Amazing Stories, October 1966.
- "The Company or the Weather", Amazing Stories, June 1937.
- "Mr. Bowen's Wife Reduces", Amazing Stories, February 1938. Reprinted in Amazing Science Fiction, September 1970.
- "The Raid from Mars", March 1939.
- "The Disappearing Papers", Future Fiction, November 1939.
- "The Oversight", Comet Stories, December 1940. Reprinted in The Man with the Strange Head.
- "The Sheriff of Thorium Gulch", Amazing Stories, August 1942.

=== Novels ===
- Paradise and Iron, Amazing Stories Quarterly, Summer 1930. Reprinted in The Man with the Strange Head.
- The Birth of a New Republic (with Jack Williamson), Amazing Stories Quarterly, Winter 1931. Reprinted in The Metal Man and Others.

=== Poems ===
- "The Specter", Weird Tales, March 1927.
- "Via Scientiae", Amazing Stories, May 1930.
- "Sonnet to Science", Amazing Stories, December 1930.

=== Essays ===
- "The Future of Scientifiction", Amazing Stories Quarterly, Summer 1929. Reprinted in Science Fiction Classics, Summer 1968; The Man with the Strange Head.
- "Meet the Authors", Amazing Stories, March 1939, by Isaac Asimov and five others.
- "The New Frontier", Startling Stories, May 1940.
