= Permabooks =

- Logo
- Status: Defunct
- Founded: 1948
- Successor: Pocket Books
- Country of origin: United States
- Publication types: Books

Cover of a 1949 Permabook combining aspects of both hardcover and paperback

Permabooks was a paperback division of Doubleday, established in 1948. Although published by Doubleday's Garden City Publishing Company in Garden City, Long Island, the Permabooks editorial office was located at 14 West 49th Street in Manhattan.

Promoted with the slogans Books of Permanent Value for Permanent Use and Books to Keep, the early Permabooks were priced at 35 cents. They did not feature the flexible covers usually associated with paperback books. Instead, as the name implies, the first Permabooks were designed in a more durable format with board covers. The interior looked like a paperback, but the exterior, measuring 4 3/8 in (110 mm) wide by 6 1/2 in (170 mm) tall, gave the impression of a reduced-size hardcover. The edges of the stiff, unflexible board cover extended 1/8 in (3 mm) past the trim of the interior pages.

The concept was heralded in a back cover blurb:

Permabooks combine the virtues of handiness for the pocket and durability for the library shelf. They are selected with care to provide reliable books for education and recreation. Each has been printed from new plates and bound in boards with special wear-resistant finish.

The initial format only lasted three years, with Doubleday switching to the standard paperback appearance in 1951, as indicated by Hyde Park Books' breakdown of the numbering sequence:

The binding influenced editorial decisions. There was no sense publishing a durable book that no one had reason to keep, so the first titles were Best-Loved Poems, How to Write Letters, Best Quotations for All Occasions and other reference-style works. The numbering sequence: P1-P92, hardbacks; there was no P93; P94-P97, hardbacks; P98, paper; P99-P101, hard; P102 on were all paperback. Plus, P5, P7, P25, P65, P89 were re-issued as paperback without being re-numbered. In 1954, the company was purchased by Pocket Books, which began numbering Permabooks with M1000, skipped to M1600, skipped for the third title to M2001, skipped yet again to M3002 for the fourth title, and then numbered sequentially until M5014, when it jumped to M7500.

The Perma Star imprint began in 1952. Perma Special, which also began that year, was a higher quality line selling for 50 cents. These imprints included originals by Richard Stark (a Donald E. Westlake pseudonym) and Ed McBain (an Evan Hunter pseudonym).

In 1954, Doubleday sold Permabooks to Pocket Books, which kept the Permabooks name as one of their imprints, issuing both originals and reprints.

== Partial list of the 1948–1950 Permabooks ==

- P1 Best Loved Poems edited by Richard Charlton MacKenzie, 1948
- P2 How to Write Letters for All Occasions by Sheff and Ingalls
- P3 Best Quotations for All Occasions
- P4 Common Errors in English and How to Avoid Them by Alexander M. Witherspoon, PhD
- P5 The Standard Bartender's Guide by Patrick Gavin Duffy, 1948
- P6 Sex and the Love Life by William J. Fielding, 1948
- P7 Eat and Reduce! by Victor H. Lindlahr
- P8 The Stainless Steel Kimono by Elliott Chaze, 1948 - *PB Best Jokes for All Occasions edited by Moulton
- P9 Ida Bailey Allen's Cookbook
- P10 The Conquest of Fear by Basil King, 1948
- P11 How Shall I Tell My Child? A Parent's Guide to the Sex Education of Children by Belle S. Mooney, 1948
- P13 Something to Live By by Dorothea Kopplin
- P14 Sight Without Glasses by Dr. Harold M. Peppard
- P15 Blackstone's Tricks Anyone Can Do by Harry Blackstone, 1948
- P16 Fortune Telling for Fun and Popularity by Paul Showers
- P17 The Handy Encyclopedia of Useful Information by Lewis Copeland (editor). Research Editors: Robert Rahtz, Leonard D. Abbott and Paul Doring
- P19 Good English Made Easy by J. Milnor Dorey
- P20 Mathematics for Home and Business by William L. Schaaf, Ph.D.
- P21 Modern Sex Life by Edwin W. Hirsch, B.S., M.D.
- P25 Handy Legal Adviser for Home and Business by Samuel G. Kling
- P26 What Your Dreams Mean by Herbert Hespro
- P32 Photography as a Hobby by Fred B. Barton
- P33 Winning Poker by Oswald Jacoby
- P34 The Handy Book of Hobbies by Geoffrey Mott-Smith, 1949
- P36 Astrology for Everyone by Evangeline Adams
- P37 Numerology by Morris C. Goodman
- P38 Three Famous French Novels (Abridged) Madame Bovary, Mlle. de Maupin and Sapho
- P39 Character Reading Made Easy by Meier
- P40 Stop Me If You've Heard This One by Lew Lehr, Cal Tinney and Roger Bower, 1949
- P41 Best Short Stories of Jack London
- P42 The Art of Living by Norman Vincent Peale, D.D.
- P43 The Human Body and How it Works by Tokay
- P44 A Handy Illustrated Guide to Football
- P45 The Golden Book of Prayer edited by D. B. Aldrich
- P47 A Handy Illustrated Guide to Basketball
- P48 Better Speech for You by Daniel P. Eginton, PhD
- P50 Psychoanalysis and Love by Andre Tridon
- P52 A Handy Illustrated Guide to Bowling
- P53 A Handy Illustrated Guide to Boxing
- P54 Magic Explained by Walter B. Gibson
- P55 The Handy Book of Indoor Games by Geoffrey Matt-Smith
- P57 Understanding Human Nature by Alfred Adler
- P58 Charles H. Goren's Bridge Quiz Book
- P59 Reading Handwriting for Fun and Popularity by Dorothy Sara
- P60 Be Glad You're Neurotic by louis E. Bisch, PhD
- P61 Grammar Made Easy by Richard D. Mallery
- P62 Permabook of Art Masterpieces, Explanatory Text by Ray Brock
- P63 The Handy Book of Gardening by Wilkinson and Tiedjens
- P64 The Meaning of Psychoanalysis by Martin W. Peck
- P65 Know Your Real Abilities by C. V. and M. E. Broadley
- P66 Stories of Famous Operas by Harold V. Milligan
- P67 The Science Fiction Galaxy edited by Groff Conklin
- P68 How to Use Your Imagination to Make Money by C. B. Roth
- P69 Favorite Verse of Edgar A. Guest
- P70 Perma Handy World Atlas
- P71 Goren's Canasta Up-to-Date by Charles H. Goren
- P72 Meditations and My Daily Strength by Preston Bradley
- P73 Personality Pointers by Jill Edwards
- P74 South Sea Stories of W. Somerset Mougham
- P75 Manners for Millions by Sophie C. Hadida
- P76 The Care and Handling of Dogs by Jack Baird
- P77 A Handy Illustrated Guide to Baseball
- P78 Buried Treasure by Ken Krippene
- P79 Everyday Speech by Bess Sondel
- P80 The New Standard Ready Reckoner
- P81 How to Read Palms by Litzka Raymond, 1950
- P82 The Perma Week-End Companion edited by E. Mitchell
- P83 How to Travel for Fun by Helen Eva Yates

Robert K. Abbett art for Spearhead (1958)

== Sources ==
- Davis, Kenneth C. Two-Bit Culture: The Paperbacking of America, Boston: Houghton Mifflin, 1984.
- Permabooks List of Published Titles from the Back Cover of P81 How to Read Palms by Litzka Raymond, 1950
