= Katherine MacLean =

American science fiction author (1925–2019)

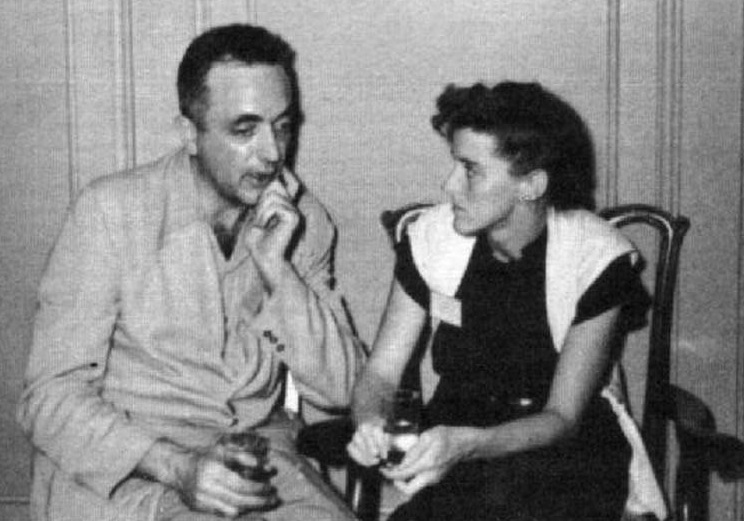
- MacLean and Fritz Leiber at the 1952 World Science Fiction Convention
- Born: Katherine Anne MacLean; January 22, 1925; Glen Ridge, New Jersey
- Died: September 1, 2019 (aged 94)
- Occupations: Novelist; short story author; essayist
- Writing career
- Period: 1949–1997
- Genre: Science fiction
- Notable awards: Nebula Award (novella) (1971) (The Missing Man) Science Fiction Writers of America Author Emeritus (2003) Cordwainer Smith Rediscovery Award (2011)

Katherine Anne MacLean (January 22, 1925 – September 1, 2019) was an American science fiction author best known for her short fiction of the 1950s which examined the impact of technological advances on individuals and society.

== Profile ==
Damon Knight wrote, "As a science fiction writer she has few peers; her work is not only technically brilliant but has a rare human warmth and richness." Brian Aldiss noted that she could "do the hard stuff magnificently," while Theodore Sturgeon observed that she "generally starts from a base of hard science, or rationalizes psi phenomena with beautifully finished logic."

According to The Encyclopedia of Science Fiction, she "was in the vanguard of those sf writers trying to apply to the soft sciences the machinery of the hard sciences".

Her stories have been included in anthologies and a few have had radio and television adaptations. Three collections of her stories have been published.

It was while she worked as a laboratory technician in 1947 that she began writing science fiction. Strongly influenced by Ludwig von Bertalanffy's General Systems Theory, her fiction has often demonstrated foresight about scientific advances.

She died on September 1, 2019, at the age of 94.

== Awards and honors ==
MacLean received a Nebula Award in 1971 for her novella "The Missing Man" (Analog, March, 1971) and she was a Professional Guest of Honor at the first WisCon in 1977. She was honored in 2003 by the Science Fiction Writers of America as an SFWA Author Emeritus. In 2011, she received the Cordwainer Smith Rediscovery Award.

== Short stories and novelettes ==
- "Defense Mechanism" (1949). This tale of hidden telepathic abilities was Katherine MacLean's first story to see print when it was published in Astounding Science Fiction (October, 1949).
- "And Be Merry" (1950). Originally in Astounding Science Fiction (February, 1950), this story was first anthologized in Groff Conklin's Omnibus of Science Fiction (Crown, 1952) and has also been published under the title "The Pyramid in the Desert." In January 2006, MacLean reflected on the science behind the story:

"And Be Merry" (Eat Drink and Be Merry for Tomorrow We Die) A lab biologist, female, takes advantage of her husband going off on an archeology trip, to use the privacy to experiment on herself for rejuvenation by a severe and dangerous method. Succeeding, she contemplates immortality, finding that safety from accidental death has become so valuable to her that she becomes a coward, cowering from all possible risk, seeing shelter in a hospital, and is only rescued from mindless panic by her husband finding her, realizing the source of her terror and rescuing her from immortality by claiming she has a slow growing tumor in an unreachable part of the body.

Finding she has no chance of evading eventual death, she immediately loses her obsession with safety, becomes interested in biochemistry again, and invents a new theory. (New at the time.) Mutation from background radiation does not just strike the sperm and egg making chromosome changes in the embryo and mutated progeny, it also strikes the chromosomes in each cell of any living creature, damages and mutates them also, and produces cancer. This cannot be prevented. She called it "somatic mutation" and used the new concept of body deterioration by slow radiation damage (age) to underpin her rediscovered recklessness, and be happy.

Even now most biotechs have not fully accepted the implication that every cell in the body can generate an entire copy of the person. But perhaps a copy will be changed and mutated for the worse by exposure to ambient radiation and other mutagens. Perhaps a cell needs to generate a placenta around it to develop into an entire body. Something like that is holding up the biochemists from successfully making copies of individuals from body or blood cells. Not for long! I wrote three more stories with novel genetic ideas before 1953. Some have not been followed up by scientists yet.

- "Incommunicado" (1950). In this novelette about communication and computers, written by MacLean in 1947, she demonstrated an ability to foresee the future evolution of personal computers. Passages in this story anticipate such latter-day digital configurations as Google Book Search, Google Video Search, PDA devices, podcasting and portable music players. At a space station operated by a computer, the station's workers begin to unconsciously develop a musical rapport with their computer in a feedback loop. When published in the June 1950 issue of Astounding Science Fiction, cover artist Miller contributed one of the more striking Astounding covers of the 1950s, blending an emotional musical performance with cyber technology. The story was reprinted a decade later in Groff Conklin's anthology, Six Great Short Science Fiction Novels (Dell, 1960), followed by MacLean's collection, The Diploids (Avon, 1962). In January, 2006, MacLean recalled this incident, trying to gate-crash a convention of electronic engineers a few years after Incommunicado was published in 1950:

In the 1930s and 1940s, scientists and boys planning to be scientists read Astounding (Analog) with close attention to the hottest most promising ideas and took them up as soon as they could get funded lab space. They did not openly express their gratitude to science fiction, because the funding depended on keeping claim to have originated the ideas they had put so much work into testing and verifying....

"I hastily looked around for a door to a lecture hall where I could sneak some listening time and get a line on current research, and be out of sight before the desk was reoccupied by the guardian of the gate....

Too late, a man built like a fullback in a business suit was bearing down on me. "I see you don't have your badge. May I have your name? I'll look it up in the registry...."

"Katherine MacLean, I came in because I am interested in--"

He interrupted. "Katherine MacLean! Are you that Katherine MacLean?" He gripped my hand and hung on. Who was that Katherine Maclean? Was I being mistaken for someone else?

"Are you the Katherine MacLean who wrote 'Incommunicado'?"

Speechless with relief, I nodded. I would not be arrested or thrown out if they would accept me as a science fiction writer. He kept his grip on my hand and turned around and bellowed to his group of chatting friends, "Guess who I've got here. The little woman who wrote 'Incommunicado'!"

...I had not been aware that my playing with communication ideas would attract the attention of prestigious Bell Telephone researchers. I had left radio and wavelength theory to my Dad as one of his hobbies and learned early that I could get a nasty shock from playing with his wiring. I could not account for their enthusiasm. I went back to the typewriter and lost myself in the story again.

The point is, that scientists not only read Astounding-Analog, they were fans of the writers and understood all the Ideas, even the obscure Ideas that were merely hinted at.

- "Contagion" (1950). Originally published in Galaxy Science Fiction (October 1950), reprinted in Women of Wonder (1975).
- "Feedback" (1951). A sociological setback occurs when conformity becomes a closed circle, prompting even more conformity; a teacher who speaks in favor of individuality is regarded as subversive. Originally in Astounding Science Fiction (July, 1951).
- "Syndrome Johnny" (1951). Published before it was even certain that DNA carried genetic information, this story is about a series of engineered retroviral plagues, initially propagated by blood transfusion, that are genetically re-engineering the human race. First published in Galaxy Science Fiction (July, 1951).
- "Pictures Don't Lie" (1951). Radio contact with extraterrestrial ship arriving on Earth. Originally in Galaxy Science Fiction (August, 1951), it was adapted to radio, television and comic books. The adaptation on the UK series Out of This World was telecast August 11, 1962. The EC Comics version of this story was "Chewed Out!", illustrated by Joe Orlando for Weird Science 12 (March–April 1952). In expanding the basic premise and adding comedic elements, scripter Al Feldstein established the setting as Blytheville, Arkansas. On several occasions MacLean noted that she ranked EC's interpretation as superior to her own story.
- "The Man Who Staked the Stars" (1952, as Charles Dye). A business mobster under investigation is slowly turned against himself by an internal doppelgänger. Originally in Planet Stories (July, 1952). This story is available online free in Project Gutenberg.
- "The Snowball Effect" (1952). A sociology professor, challenged to prove his theories of the dynamic growth of organizations, rewrites the rules of a smalltown sewing circle to have "more growth drive than the Roman Empire." He is far more successful than he ever anticipated. Originally in Galaxy Science Fiction (September, 1952), and adapted for the X Minus One radio series in 1956.
- "Games" (1953). A boy becomes the characters in his make-believe games. Originally in Galaxy Science Fiction (March, 1953). Available online
- "The Diploids" (1953). In this novella, a young lawyer suspects he may be an alien because of certain physical and biochemical abnormalities but discovers that he is a commercial human embryonic cell line, sold for research and illegally grown to maturity. Originally in Thrilling Wonder Stories (April, 1953). Also titled "Six Fingers."
- "Cosmic Checkmate" (1958). This collaboration by MacLean and Charles V. De Vet, published in Astounding Science Fiction (March, 1958), was nominated for a 1959 Hugo. It was expanded as Second Game in 1962 and again in 1981. Two gamers play a multi-level game to determine whether Earth's civilization wins.
- "Unhuman Sacrifice" (1958). Published in Astounding Science Fiction (November, 1958), reprinted in Damon Knight's anthology A Century of Science Fiction (1962). The attempts of a missionary to spread the word on an alien planet are frustrated by the aliens' life cycle.
- "Interbalance" (1960). Published in Fantasy & Science Fiction (October 1960).
- "The Kidnapping of Baroness 5" (1995) Originally published in Analog; republished in the anthologies Women of Other Worlds (edited by Helen Merrick & Tess Williams) and A Woman's Liberation (edited by Connie Willis and Sheila Williams). In a post-apocalyptic world, a geneticist struggles to help preserve and lengthen the lives of the genetically damaged descendants of the survivors of a genetic experiment to extend the human lifespan that went horribly wrong. Instead, with each generation, lifespan gets shorter, and as less and less knowledge is passed down to each succeeding generation, society has regressed to a feudal state. She fits into society by casting herself as a sort of "good witch" cum healer, passing off her medical expertise and her efforts to correct the damage to the human aging process as magic.

== Bibliography ==
=== Novels ===
- The Man in the Bird Cage (1971)
- Missing Man (1975). In a balkanized New York City, an engineer working for the city's disaster planning section has his inside knowledge exploited to cause disasters. The novel is a fix-up of MacLean's three Rescue Squad stories, including the 1971 Nebula Award-winning novella of the same name.
- Dark Wing (1979). Co-written with husband Carl West. In a world where medical knowledge has been outlawed, a young man discovers a medical kit, remnant of times past, which he uses to help those around him and to fight his way towards a better understanding of science and medicine.

=== Short story collections ===
- The Diploids and Other Flights of Fancy (Avon, 1962). Her first short story collection, it comprises: "The Diploids" (a.k.a. "Six Fingers" or "The Diploids–Die, Freak"), "Feedback", "Pictures Don't Lie", "Incommunicado", "The Snowball Effect", "Defense Mechanism", "And Be Merry" (a.k.a. "The Pyramid in the Desert"), and "Games".
- The Trouble with You Earth People (Donning/Starblaze, 1980). Contains "The Trouble with You Earth People", "The Gambling Hell and the Sinful Girl", "Syndrome Johnny", "Trouble with Treaties" (with Tom Condit), "The Origin of the Species", "Collision Orbit", "The Fittest", "These Truths", "Contagion", "Brain Wipe" and her Nebula Award-winning "The Missing Man".

=== Memoir ===
- For Martin Greenberg's Fantastic Lives: Autobiographical Essays by Notable Science Fiction Writers (Southern Illinois University Press, 1981) she wrote "The Expanding Mind," a memoir of her youth and the impact of science fiction on the mind of a young girl.
- For Eric Leif Davin's Partners in Wonder: Women and the Birth of Science Fiction, 1926-1965, MacLean supplied a detailed description of her negotiations with John W. Campbell in regard to the publication of her earliest stories.

== Listen to ==
- X Minus One: "The Snowball Effect" (August 14, 1956)
- X Minus One: "Pictures Don't Lie" (October 24, 1956)
- Episode 4 of the podcast Buxom Blondes with Ray Guns (Hannah Wolfe, February 17, 2018) features two 1954 stories by Katherine MacLean.
