= Groff Conklin =

American science fiction editor

Edward Groff Conklin (September 6, 1904 – July 19, 1968) was an American science fiction anthologist. He edited 40 anthologies of science fiction, one of mystery stories (co-edited with physician Noah Fabricant), wrote books on home improvement and was a freelance writer on scientific subjects as well as a published poet. From 1950 to 1955, he was the book critic for Galaxy Science Fiction.

Born in Glen Ridge, New Jersey, Conklin was educated at Dartmouth College and Harvard University, and graduated from Columbia University in 1927. At Columbia, Conklin was a member of the Philolexian Society. He drifted through a series of jobs in the 1930s and 1940s, working for several government agencies during WWII. He was a book editor for Robert M. McBride & Co. and did public relations work for the Federal Home Loan Bank, the Office of Strategic Services, the Department of Commerce, the National Cancer Institute and the American Diabetes Association. He was also a former scientific researcher for the N.W. Ayer & Son advertising agency.

== Short fiction ==
It was as an editor of fiction that Conklin found his niche, beginning as early as 1930. At the age of 26, while employed as an assistant manager at New York's Doubleday Bookstore, he arranged for the hardcover publication of a story first published in The Smart Set (November 1913), reprinting "A Flood" by the Irish writer George Moore in a limited edition of 185 signed copies. In 1934, Conklin and Burton Rascoe published The Smart Set Anthology (reissued in 1944 as The Bachelor's Companion), the first collection of stories from that literary magazine.

Conklin's interest in short fiction continued with the 1936 publication of The New Republic Anthology: 1915-1935, edited with Bruce Bliven. The following year, he married Lucy Tempkin on October 1. During the next decade, he wrote books about subways, rental libraries and home construction, in addition to poetry and numerous magazine articles.

== Science fiction ==
Conklin did not grow up as a reader of science fiction, but came to it later in life. In his Galaxy Five-Star Shelf column of December, 1954, he states, "...I actually did not become an earnest devotee of the form until 1944, about a year before the Atomic Age actually opened....The first item I remember reading that could be classified as science fiction was H. G. Wells' Men Like Gods, back in 1924 when I was a college sophomore. It had a tremendous effect on me...." A roommate from 1930 provided him with "bound volumes of tear-sheets of early weirds, fantastics and 'scientifictions' from the old Argosy, All-Story and others...." He sent a proposal for his first science fiction anthology to Crown Publishers in 1944, and the book was issued in 1946, several months ahead of the other great sf anthology of that year, Adventures in Time and Space edited by Raymond J. Healy and J. Francis McComas.

After his first science fiction anthology, The Best of Science Fiction (1946), weighing in at 785 pages, he followed with A Treasury of Science Fiction (1948). Readers soon began to seek out books with his strikingly unusual and exotic name on the cover—The Science Fiction Galaxy (1950), The Big Book of Science Fiction (1950) and Possible Worlds of Science Fiction (1951). The prominent display of Conklin's huge hardcover anthologies in the "New Titles" section of libraries led numerous American readers to discover science fiction during the genre's early 1950s boom. In the Grip of Terror (Permabooks, 1951) was an offbeat collection of horror tales, and he collaborated with Lucy Conklin on The Supernatural Reader in 1953, a year before her death. Four years later, he married Florence Alexander Wohlken.

His book review column, "Galaxy's Five-Star Shelf", was a key feature in Galaxy Science Fiction from its premiere issue (October 1950) until October 1955. During that period, he also edited Grosset & Dunlap's Science Fiction Classics series, which he conceived as an inexpensive alternative to hard-to-find small-press editions of such titles as Robert A. Heinlein's Beyond This Horizon and Isaac Asimov's I, Robot, although the first title in the series (Henry Kuttner's Fury) was that story's first book publication.

The Weather-Conditioned House (1958) is not science fiction but a practical discussion of methods involved in weather-conditioning a house. The book was authoritative enough that it was reissued with an update in 1982.

In the last three years of his life, Conklin was the staff science editor for The American Heritage Dictionary of the English Language. He lived in New York at 150 West 96th Street. At the age of 63, he died of emphysema in his summer home at Pawling, New York.

A major survey of Conklin's contribution to science fiction is contained in Bud Webster's 41 Above the Rest: An Index and Checklist for the Anthologies of Groff Conklin. Webster's study prompted this comment from Barry N. Malzberg:

Groff Conklin was the most important science fiction anthologist through the years of the genre's true second generation, that point at which its previously magazine-bound masterpieces were being systematically located, aligned and placed into permanent format. His contribution over the period of two decades was irreplaceable and all of our postwar history exists in the penumbra of his work. Bud Webster has in this index granted an act of scholarship and homage of equal irreplaceability.

Groff Conklin was also a contributor of definitions to the American Heritage Dictionary of the English Language. He can be found listed under the heading of Definitions, along with others.

== Bibliography ==
=== Non-fiction ===
- How to Run a Rental Library (1934)
- All About Subways (1938)
- All About Houses (1939)
- Good News About Diabetes (1954) with Lucy Conklin
- Insulate and Air Condition Your Home (1955) with Arthur Watkins
- The Weather Conditioned House (1958)
- Diabetics Unknown (1961)
- The Dangerous Cold: Its Cures and Complications (1965) with Noah D. Fabricant

=== Anthologies edited ===
- The Smart Set Anthology (1934) (variant title: The Bachelor's Companion (1944)) with Burton Rascoe
- The New Republic Anthology, 1915-1935 (1936) with Bruce Bliven
- The Best of Science Fiction (1946) (variant title: The Golden Age of Science Fiction (1980))
- A Treasury of Science Fiction (1948)
- Big Book of Science Fiction (1950) (variant title: The Classic Book of Science Fiction (1978))
- The Science Fiction Galaxy (1950)
- In the Grip of Terror (1951)
- Possible Worlds of Science Fiction (1951)
- Invaders of Earth (1952) (variant title: Invaders of Earth (abridged) (1955), Enemies in Space (abridged) (1962))
- Omnibus of Science Fiction (1952) (variant titles: Strange Travels in Science Fiction (abridged) (1953), Strange Adventures in Science Fiction (abridged) (1954), Science Fiction Omnibus (1956))
- Crossroads in Time (1953)
- Science-Fiction Adventures in Dimension (1953) (variant title: Adventures in Dimension (1955))
- The Supernatural Reader (1953) with Lucy Conklin
- 6 Great Short Novels of Science Fiction (1954)
- Science Fiction Thinking Machines (1954) (variant title: Selections from Science Fiction Thinking Machines (abridged) (1955))
- Operation Future (1955)
- Science Fiction Adventures in Mutation (1955)
- Science Fiction Terror Tales (1955)
- The Graveyard Reader (1958)
- Br-r-r-! (1959)
- 4 for the Future (1959)
- 13 Great Stories of Science Fiction (1960)
- Six Great Short Science Fiction Novels (1960)
- Great Science Fiction by Scientists (1962)
- Twisted (1962)
- Worlds of When (1962)
- 12 Great Classics of Science Fiction (1963)
- 17 X Infinity (1963)
- Fifty Short Science Fiction Tales (1963) with Isaac Asimov
- Great Science Fiction About Doctors (1963) with Noah D. Fabricant
- Great Stories of Space Travel (1963)
- Human and Other Beings (1963) with Allen de Graeff
- Dimension 4 (1964)
- Five-Odd (1964) (variant title: Possible Tomorrows (1973))
- Great Detective Stories About Doctors (1965) with Noah D. Fabricant
- 13 Above the Night (1965)
- 5 Unearthly Visions (1965)
- Giants Unleashed (1965) Variant Title: Minds Unleashed (1965)
- Another Part of the Galaxy (1966)
- Science Fiction Oddities (1966) (variant titles: Science Fiction Oddities (abridged) (1969), Science Fiction Oddities, Second Series (abridged) (1969))
- Seven Come Infinity (1966)
- Elsewhere and Elsewhen (1968) (variant titles: Science Fiction Elsewhere (abridged) (1970), Science Fiction Elsewhen (abridged) (1970))
- Seven Trips Through Time and Space (1968)

=== Single-author collections edited ===
- 28 Science Fiction Stories by H. G. Wells (1952)
- A Way Home by Theodore Sturgeon (1955)
- Thunder and Roses by Theodore Sturgeon (1957)
- Ten Great Mysteries by Edgar Allan Poe (1960)

== Sources ==
- R. Reginald. Science Fiction and Fantasy Literature: A Checklist; Volume 2: Contemporary Science Fiction Authors II (p. 860). Detroit, Michigan: Gale Research Company, 1979. ISBN 0-8103-1051-1
