= Tanith Lee bibliography =

Bibliography of British science fiction and fantasy writer Tanith Lee:

== Series ==
=== Birthgrave series ===
- The Birthgrave (1975)
- Shadowfire (1978) (US title: Vazkor, Son of Vazkor)
- Quest for the White Witch (1978) (2016 ed. titled: Hunting the White Witch)

=== The Blood Opera Sequence ===
- Dark Dance (1992)
- Personal Darkness (1993)
- Darkness, I (1994)

=== The Claidi Journals ===
- Law of the Wolf Tower (1998) (US title: Wolf Tower)
- Wolf Star Rise (2000) (US title: Wolf Star)
- Queen of the Wolves (2001) (US title: Wolf Queen)
- Wolf Wing (2002)
- The Claidi Journals (2002) (omnibus of the first three novels)

=== Colouring Book ===
- L'Amber (2006)
- Greyglass (2011)
- To Indigo (2011)
- Killing Violets (2012)
- Ivoria (2012)
- Cruel Pink (2013)
- Turquoiselle (2014)

=== Four-BEE (Don't Bite the Sun) ===
- Don't Bite the Sun (1976)
- Drinking Sapphire Wine (1977)
- Biting the Sun (1999) (omnibus of both novels)

=== Ghosteria ===
- Ghosteria Volume One: The Stories (2014)
- Ghosteria Volume Two: Zircons May Be Mistaken (2014)

=== The Lionwolf Series ===
- Cast a Bright Shadow (2004)
- Here In Cold Hell (2005)
- No Flame but Mine (2007)

=== Marcheval ===
- A Different City (2015)
- Idoll (2015)
- Not Stopping at Heaven (2015)
- The Portrait in Gray (2015)

=== The Piratica Series ===
- Piratica: Being a Daring Tale of a Singular Girl's Adventures Upon the High Seas (2004)
- Piratica II: Return to Parrot Island (2006)
- Piratica III: The Family Sea (2007)

=== Sabella ===
- Sabella, or the Blood Stone (1980)
- Kill the Dead (1980)
- Sometimes, After Sunset (1980) (omnibus of both novels)

=== Secret Books of Paradys ===
- The Book of the Damned (1988)
- The Book of the Beast (1988)
- The Book of the Dead (1991) (short story collection)
- The Book of the Mad (1993)
- The Book of the Damned & The Book of the Beast (1988) (omnibus, a.k.a. The Secret Books of Paradys 1 & 2, 1991)
- "The Nightmare's Tale" (1990)
- The Secret Books of Paradys 3 & 4 (1993) (omnibus)
- The Secret Books of Paradys (2006) (omnibus of all four books)

=== Secret Books of Venus ===
- Faces Under Water (1998)
- Saint Fire (1999)
- A Bed of Earth (2002)
- Venus Preserved (2003)
- The Secret Books of Venus I & II (1999) (omnibus)
- The Secret Books of Venus III & IV (2003) (omnibus)

=== S.I.L.V.E.R. series ===
- The Silver Metal Lover (1981)
- Metallic Love (2005)
- The Tin Man (TBD)

=== Tales from the Flat Earth ===
- Night's Master (1978) (interior illustrations by George Barr, and Alicia Austin in 1985)
- Death's Master (1979)
- Delusion's Master (1981)
- Delirium's Mistress (1986)
- Night's Sorceries (1986) (a collection of novellas)
- Tales from the Flat Earth: The Lords of Darkness (1987) (omnibus of first three novels)
- Tales from the Flat Earth: Night's Daughter (1987) (omnibus of fourth and fifth books)
- "I Bring You Forever" (1998) (short fiction)
- "The Man Who Stole the Moon" (2001) (short fiction)
- "Our Lady of Scarlet" (2009) (short fiction)
- The Earth is Flat: Tales from the Flat Earth and Elsewhere (2023)

=== The Unicorn Series ===
- Black Unicorn (1991)
- Gold Unicorn (1994)
- Red Unicorn (1997)

=== Voyage of the Basset ===
A tie-in to Voyage of the Basset

- Islands in the Sky (1999)

=== Wars of Vis ===
- The Storm Lord (1976)
- Anackire (1983)
- The White Serpent (1988)

== Other novels ==
- The Dragon Hoard (1971)
- East of Midnight (1977)
- Volkhavaar (1977)
- The Castle of Dark (1978)
- Shon the Taken (1979)
- Electric Forest (1979)
- Day by Night (1980)
- Lycanthia, or The Children of Wolves (1981)
- Prince on a White Horse (1982)
- Sung in Shadow (1983) (a fantasy retelling of Romeo and Juliet)
- Days of Grass (1985)
- A Heroine of the World (1989) (cover artwork by Anne Yvonne Gilbert)
- The Blood of Roses (1990)
- Heart-Beast (1992)
- Elephantasm (1993)
- Eva Fairdeath (1994)
- Vivia (1995)
- Reigning Cats and Dogs (1995)
- When the Lights Go Out (1996)
- The Gods Are Thirsty (1996) (a historical novel set during the French Revolution)
- White As Snow (2000) (a retelling ofSnow White)
- Mortal Suns (2003)
- Death of the Day (2004)
- 34 (2004) (as Esther Garber)
- Indigara (2007)

== Collections ==
- Princess Hynchatti & Some Other Surprises (1972) (collection of original fairy tales)
- Unsilent Night (1981)
- Cyrion (1982) (collection of short stories framed by a novella, all centred on the title character)
- Red as Blood, or Tales from the Sisters Grimmer (1983) (collection of fantasy retellings of fairy tales)
- Tamastara, or The Indian Nights (1984) (collection of stories and novellas themed around India)
- The Gorgon and Other Beastly Tales (1985) (collection of various short stories)
- Dreams of Dark and Light: The Great Short Fiction of Tanith Lee (1986) (collection of various short stories)
- Dark Castle, White Horse (1986) (omnibus of the two unrelated novels The Castle of Dark and Prince on a White Horse)
- Forests of The Night (1989) (collection)
- Women as Demons: The Male Perception of Women through Space and Time (1989) (collection of various short stories)
- Nightshades: Thirteen Journeys Into Shadow (1993) (collection of short stories and a novella)
- Fatal Women (2004) (as Esther Garber)
- Tempting The Gods: The Selected Stories of Tanith Lee, Volume One (2009)
- Hunting The Shadows: The Selected Stories of Tanith Lee, Volume Two (2009)
- Sounds and Furies: Seven Faces of Darkness (2010)
- Disturbed By Her Song (2010)
- Cold Grey Stones (2012)
- Animate Objects (2013)
- Space is Just a Starry Night (2013) short story collection, Aqueduct Press, Seattle
- Colder Greyer Stones (2013)
- Phantasya (2014)
- Dancing Through The Fire (2015)
- Blood 20: Tales of Vampire Horror (2015)
- Legenda Maris (2015)
- Redder Than Blood (2017)
- The Weird Tales of Tanith Lee (2017)
- Tanith by Choice: The Best of Tanith Lee (2017)
- Venus Burning: Realms (2018)
- Tanith Lee A-Z (2018)
- Strindberg's Ghost Sonata and Other Uncollected Tales (2019)
- Love in a Time of Dragons & Other Rare Tales (2019)
- A Wolf at the Door and Other Rare Tales (2019)
- The Heart of the Moon (2019)
- The Empress of Dreams (2021)
- The Earth is Flat: Tales from the Flat Earth and Elsewhere (2023)

== Chapbooks ==
- The Betrothed (1968)
- Animal Castle (1972)
- Companions on the Road (1975)
- The Winter Players (1976)
- Companions on the Road and The Winter Players: Two Novellas (1977) (omnibus)
- The Beautiful Biting Machine (1984)
- Madame Two Swords (1988)
- Into Gold (1991)
- Louisa the Poisoner (1996)

== Short fiction ==
- The Thaw (1979)
- "Pied piper". F&SF. 61 (1): 53–67. July 1981.
- "All the birds of hell". F&SF. October 1998.
- "The eye in the heart". F&SF. 98 (3): 37–40. March 2000.
- "Persian Eyes" (2002) (appeared in both the DAW 30th Anniversary: Fantasy and Year's Best Fantasy 3 anthologies)
