= The Piratica Series =

Book series by Tanith Lee

The Piratica Series is a series of young adult fantasy novels by Tanith Lee.

== Piratica: Being a Daring Tale of a Singular Girl’s Adventures Upon the High Seas ==
Piratica: Being a Daring Tale of Singular Girl's Adventures Upon the High Seas is a fantasy novel in The Piratica Series. The novel was written in 2004.

Piratica: Being a Daring Tale of Singular Girl's Adventures Upon the High Seas
- Author: Tanith Lee
- Cover artist: Glenn Harrington
- Language: English
- Series: The Piratica Series
- Genre: Fantasy novel
- Publisher: Dutton Juvenile
- Publication date: 2004
- Publication place: England
- Media type: Print (hardback & paperback)
- Pages: 304 pp
- ISBN: 0-525-47324-6
- OCLC: 54693328

=== Plot summary ===
The novel takes place in a world somewhat parallel to Earth, in the year Seventeen-Twelvety, which is equivalent to approximately 1802 in Earth years. The main character is sixteen-year-old Artemesia Fitz-Willoghby Weatherhouse, who is an amnesiac student at the Angels Academy of Young Maidens. On the afternoon of Christmas Eve, while practising deportment, she tumbles down the stairs and hits her head on the banister, restoring her memories from six years previous – of her life aboard a pirate ship led by her mother, Molly Faith, more commonly known as Piratica, until a misfired cannon caused Molly's death and Artemesia's amnesia.

Her sudden change in behaviour and into men's clothing due to the restoration of her memories convince her teachers and fellow students that she is mad, and she is locked in a room for safety. She quickly escapes up the chimney and sets off to locate her mother's former crew members. On the way she meets Felix Phoenix, a traveller, and forces him to trade clothes with her. She locks him in a sooty, abandoned house and continues on her way.

From there, she locates some of her mother's old 'crew' and commandeers a ship. When she meets them they all think it is her mother Molly. She finds out that they advertise coffee and have a small ship. Heading out the stop at a town where they show her a theatre. They then explain to her that her mother and themselves were only actors and not pirates. Confused Art makes a plan to become the REAL Piratica, and sail the seas. She holds by her mother's (stage) code of honour- she steals by guile and trickery, and never takes a life. When stealing a boat Felix Phoenix joins them. Together they set out to find a mysterious treasure isle.

== Piratica II: Return to Parrot Island ==
Piratica II: Return to Parrot Island
- Author: Tanith Lee
- Cover artist: Wilson Ong
- Language: English
- Series: The Piratica Series
- Genre: Fantasy novel
- Publisher: Dutton Juvenile
- Publication date: 2006
- Publication place: England
- Media type: Print (hardback & paperback)
- Pages: 360 pp
- ISBN: 0-525-47769-1
- OCLC: 73693174

Piratica II: Return to Parrot Island is a fantasy novel by Tanith Lee. The novel was published in 2006 and is part of The Piratica Series.

== Piratica III: The Family Sea ==
Piratica III: The Family Sea
- Author: Tanith Lee
- Language: English
- Series: The Piratica Series
- Genre: Fantasy novels
- Publisher: Hodder Children's Books
- Publication date: 6 September 2007
- Publication place: England
- Media type: Print (hardback & paperback)
- Pages: 416 pp
- ISBN: 0-340-93085-3
- OCLC: 153554846

Piratica III: The Family Sea is a fantasy novel from The Piratica Series by Tanith Lee. It was published in 2007. Piratica III explores the reason behind Golden Goliath's hatred of Molly and also explains why Art cannot love her child. It also features the return of Goldie Girl. The UK edition was released in 2007 but the US edition has yet to be released.

== Characters ==
=== Art Blastside (Piratica) ===
Artemesia Fitz-Willoughby Weatherhouse/Art Blastside
- The Piratica Series character
- First appearance: Piratica
- Last appearance: Piratica III
- Created by: Tanith Lee

In-universe information
- Aliases: Art Blastside, Piratica
- Species: Human
- Gender: Female
- Occupation: Pirate
- Family: George Weatherhouse (father), Molly Faith (mother)
- Spouse: Felix Phoenix
- Children: One unknown child
- Nationality: English

The protagonist of the series, Artemesia Fitz-Willoghby Weatherhouse is the only child of Landsir Weatherhouse and actress Molly Faith. When she escapes from the Angels Academy for Young Maidens after the restoration of her memory, Artemesia dresses in boy's clothes and changes her name to "Art Blastside". Determined to return to the life she remembers so clearly, though others tell her it was fiction, she gathers her crew and sets out to sea to become known throughout the land and seas she as "Piratica", the stage name of her mother.

==== Pre-Piratica ====
As soon as she was born, Art's mother took her from her father's house. When she was two, Molly and Ebad took her with them on a sea voyage around the world. The voyage ended when their ship was attacked by the Golden Goliath. However, Art retained memories of this time and regained them along with her other memories after the accident at the Angels Academy.
Molly became a stage actress and Art participated in her shows until the age of ten, when a cannon accident caused Molly's death and Art's amnesia.
Her father regained custody of her and sent her to the Angels Academy of Young Maidens.

=== Felix Phoenix ===
Felix Phoenix has dark blue eyes and ice blond hair. His father was killed by the Golden Goliath and he is a good singer. While being chased by an angry mob who thinks that Felix is the notorious Highway man Cuckoo Jack, Felix is rescued by Art and her crew.. Felix travels with Art and her crew but says he doesn't want to stay; however when the chance arrives to leave and be freed from Art's ship, "The Unwelcome Stranger", he decides to stay. Art, under the belief that Felix has just taken a liking to her crew, thinks nothing much of his stay but it turns out that Felix has many more reasons to stay, some more sinister than others.

=== Original Crew (Piratica) ===
- Ebadiah "Ebad" Vooms is a former slave who was freed when England became a republic. He was brought to England from Africay when he was nine; during that voyage he learned how to man a ship. He and Molly Faith became lovers after she left Art's father, and they sailed together until their ship was attacked by the Golden Goliath. They began acting out their former adventures on the stage. Served in Molly's fictional crew as second officer. When Art becomes Captain of the Unwelcome Stranger he serves as first officer.
- Eerie O'Shea is an Irish actor who was in the Piratica plays with Molly Faith. Served in Molly's fictional crew as third officer. When Art becomes Captain of the Unwelcome Stranger he serves as second officer.
- Dirk is an actor who was in the Piratica plays with Molly Faith. Has a tendency to be preoccupied with his clothes and looks and calls others by terms of endearment.
- Whuskery is an actor who was in the Piratica plays with Molly Faith. His most distinguishing feature is his blue-black moustache. Fans have suggested he may be in a relationship with Dirk.
- Salt "Pete" Peter is an actor who was in the Piratica plays with Molly Faith. He was 20 years old at the time. He is Salt Walter's older brother.
- Salt "Walt" Walter is an actor who was in the Piratica plays with Molly Faith. He is Salt Peter's younger brother and is two years older than Art. He has red hair and is very sensitive.
- Honest Liar is an actor who was in the Piratica plays with Molly Faith. He has a round moon face and wears a red handkerchief around his head and brass earrings. He is the youngest crew member. He is illiterate, having never received formal education; however he possesses a keen intuition and picks up skills easily.
- Black Knack is an actor who was in the Piratica plays with Molly Faith. A bad-tempered man with black stubble, a black eye patch, and blackened nails. He worked as a double agent for Little Goldie Girl. She shot him in the back at the end of Piratica.
- Glad Cuthbert is a former sailor who had served on an English vessel, who chose to join Art's crew when she attacked the Royal. He changed his first name to Glad after his wife, Gladys. He serves as a gunner. He is skilled in playing the hurdy-gurdy and teaches some of the crew to play.

=== Privateer Crew (Piratica II) ===
- Tazbo Lightheart, "an experienced primer", ten years old
- Ert Liemouse
- Doran Bell, the pseudonym of Kassandra Holroyal, when she operates under the name Belladora Fan and dresses as a man.
- Shemps, a gunner
- de Weevil
- Gideon Squalls
- Sikkars Eye, second primer, twelve years old
- Mothope
- Stott Dabbet
- Plinke, pronounced "Pey-Lin-Kee". Cathay.
- Grug
- Oscar Bagge
- Boozle O'Nyons
- Lupin Hawkscoot
- Larry Lully, a gunner from Own Accord in the Blue Indies
- Nib Several
- Shadrach Lost
- Feasty Jack, "a long, lank, grizzled man, age about forty, bristly with stubble". The cook of the Unwelcome Stranger.

=== Other Pirates ===
- Golden Goliath was the most fearsome pirate ever. Among his victims was Felix's uncle. He supposedly died at the hands of Mary Hell. Recent rumours have indicated he may still be alive.
- Hurkon Beare is a Canadee who was the former First Officer of Molly's fictional crew. He is described as "grizzled but young" and "a little short in one leg". He now collects art and makes his former off of double crossing others.
- Little Goldie Girl is the daughter of the Golden Goliath. She is stunningly beautiful, with dragon-green cat's eyes, black curls, and white skin. She also has a small cross on one cheek where Art scarred her. She is deceitful, vicious, and cunning. She uses slang when teasing or trying to deceive.
  - Mr. Beast – First Officer. Usually richly dressed. Described as shaggy and beastly. Has a large attachment to his hat. Presumably died along with Little Goldie Girl at the end of Piratica II.
  - Mr. Pest – Second Officer. Usually richly dressed. Described in comparison to Mr. Beast as thinner and "not so beastly". Presumably hung at the end of Piratica.
  - Tattoo – Crew member. Stocky, fit and fleet. Tattoo on nose. Presumably hung at the end of Piratica.
- Mary Hell
- Molly Faith was the mother of Art Blastside. She had strawberry blonde hair and gooseberry green eyes. She originally worked as an actress. She married George Fitz-Willoughby Weatherhouse, but grew to hate him and stayed with him only long enough for the birth of Art. She left him to return to the stage, and there she met Ebadiah Vooms. They went out to sea together, until the Golden Goliath attacked their ship. They were forced to return to England, where they gathered an acting troupe and began performing the Piratica plays. Molly played Piratica until Art was ten, when their cannon exploded in the accident that caused Molly's death and Art's amnesia.
- Michael Holroyal

=== English Citizens ===
- Adam Makepeace was Felix's father. He had black hair. He was a Landsir who took good care of his workers. At the death of his brother Solomon Makepeace and the resulting poverty of his workers, his hair became white. He died of heartbreak when Felix was 8.
- Miss Eeble One of the teachers at the Angels Academy for Young Maidens. She is nicknamed "The Evil Eeble" by her students because of her strict manner.
- Fan and Ann are two young ladies who invite Felix to join them on their ice skating trip up a river to their aunt and uncle's house on Christmas Day. When they learn he is wanted for arrest, they help him escape out a window.
- Miss Grash The Principal of the Angels Academy for Young Maidens. She is nicknamed "Grasping Miss Grash" by her students.
- Kassandra "Kassie" Holroyal is a famous actress who works undercover as a woman named Belladora Fan, who dresses as a man named Dorian Bell, to aid the French Revolution. Her brother is Michael Holroyal.
- Lansir George Fitz-Willoughby Weatherhouse is the wealthy English landowner of Richman's Park and the biological father of Art Blastside. Usually impeccably dressed in ornate finery. He had nothing to do with Art until the death of her mother, at which he sent her to the Angels Academy of Young Maidens. Six years later, when she regained her memory and went to sea, he disowned her entirely.
- Solomon Makepeace was Adam Makepeace's brother and Felix's uncle. He took Adam's ship, loaded with all his cargo, to sea. The ship was attacked by the Golden Goliath, and Solomon was killed.

=== Ships ===
- Unwelcome Stranger – The name of Molly's ship in the Piratica plays. Later, Art and her crew capture the Elephant and turn her into a real Unwelcome Stranger.They give the Unwelcome stranger the figurehead off the small thirty-foot ship "Pirate coffe"
- Enemy – Formerly the Golden Goliath's ship, now owned by Little Goldie Girl.
- Pirate Coffee – a ship made for transporting coffee. Stolen and used by Art and her crew until it sank as they captured the Elephant.
- FRS Elephant – Originally the Free Republican Ship Elephant. Captured by Art and her crew and made into the Unwelcome Stranger.
- Royal A Franco-Spanish trader, with a round-looking hull. Art's crew robbed her of all her goods, and Glad Cuthbert, a member of their crew.
- Unnamed Amer Rican clipper Robbed by Art and her crew.
- Saucy Mrs. Minnie A vessel owned by Hurkon Beare.
- Utterly Matchless – The Naval Destroyer FRS Utterly Matchless. Felix was taken back to England on this ship.
- Voyager – Adam Makepeace's ship. Destroyed and sunk by the Golden Goliath after he slaughtered all of the passengers.
- We Do The Impossible – Naval Destroyer FRS We Do The Impossible. The ship on which Art and her crew were taken back to England to be tried.
- Total Devastation – Naval Destroyer FRS Total Devastation. The ship on which Goldie and her crew were taken back to England to be tried.

=== Miscellaneous characters ===
- Teeboa Sinjohn Sniff is the owner of the Punch and Sniff Tavern. He is a 7-foot-tall (2.1 m) black man; bulky, broad, and muscular, with tattoos across his arms and shoulders. He has white teeth, except for one gold tooth with a tiny diamond in the center.

=== Animals ===
- Plunqwette, a red and green parrot formerly belonging to Molly Faith, now in the care of Art
- Muck, also known as "The Cleanest Dog in England". A free spirited dog who often travels with Art and her crew.
- Maudy, a white parrot belonging to Feasty Jack.
- Lucinda, a chicken that becomes a pet for Salt Walter and the crew. Lucinda is the happy mother hen of a crocodile egg.
- Jack, a crocodile that the chicken, Lucinda, looks after as if it were her own.
- Towser, the cat that acts like a dog who befriends Muck in Piratica III
