= The Gods Are Thirsty (Tanith Lee) =

1996 novel by Tanith Lee

- First edition
- Author: Tanith Lee
- Cover artist: The Execution of Louis XVI - 1793 (Danish School)
- Language: English
- Genre: Historical fiction
- Publisher: The Overlook Press
- Publication date: 1996
- Media type: Print

The Gods Are Thirsty is a 1996 historical novel by British author Tanith Lee set during the French Revolution. It follows the rise and fall of journalist Camille Desmoulins, who launches the Revolution and is eventually sent to the guillotine.

== Synopsis ==
During a night out at the bar, struggling writer Camille Desmoulins hears that the popular finance minister Jacques Necker has been dismissed from office. At Georges Danton's behest, Camille stands on a table and tells the people of the Third Estate to rise against the monarch of France, King Louis XVI. The people of the Third Estate storm the Bastille and the French Revolution begins. Camille is in love with a noble 19-year-old girl, Lucile Duplessis, whose father will not allow them to be together. Camille writes pro-revolutionary newspapers and pamphlets with Comte de Mirabeau as his benefactor, but soon begins writing pamphlets criticizing Mirabeau. Drunk on wine, Camille tries to convince Lucile's father to let them wed, and after Camille is put on trial for his writings and saved by Maximilien Robespierre, Lucile's father agrees to the marriage.

Mirabeau gets sick and dies. Camille writes an article questioning Mirabeau's death and his methods. He and Danton lead the people to Champ de Mars, fighting with the National Guard. Camille learns that Lucile is pregnant and Camille runs off to live in the country. Danton sends him a letter, asking him to return and help rebuild Paris. Anarchy breaks out over a bread shortage; the people blame the King. The people break into the King's palace and capture him; learning of Louis' capture, Prussia sends troops into France. Hotel de Ville becomes a battleground and the people drive the Prussians out of the country. Riots erupt as the people purge traitors and anti-revolutionists. Danton creates The Committee of General Defense to arrest and try anti-revolutionists, who are beheaded by the guillotine, a symbol for the Reign of Terror.

Robespierre denounces the acts of the revolution. He has the heads of the committee of general defense step down and becomes the head of the renamed Committee of Public Safety. Camille begins to distrust Robespierre, and his worry is confirmed when Robespierre takes down those whom he deems a threat. Camille wants an end to the revolution. Robespierre tells Camille of his plans to become France's new king, which Camille protests. Camille writes an article asking for moderation and an end to beheadings and then he is promptly arrested along with Danton and other Dantonists. All are tried by the Revolutionary Tribunal, found guilty, and sent to the guillotine. Lucile is guillotined. In the months following, Robespierre and his allies are also guillotined.

== Background and writing process ==
Tanith Lee began writing The Gods Are Thirsty in 1982, and finished her first draft in the beginning of 1985. As of 2009, this was one of only two books that she wrote multiple drafts of, the other being The Storm Lord.

Lee was inspired to write this book ten years before writing it, while watching a play on the television called Danton's Death that dramatized Georges Jacques Danton's trial and death. She also read about a newspaperman who was intimately associated with both Danton and Maximilien Robespierre. However, people said it would be a poor decision to work on because the story was too horrible, so she held off on writing it for years.

When she wrote the novel, she put much effort into researching the French Revolution. Tanith wanted to make the characters seem like actors. She focused more on Camille Desmoulins because he was the link between the two main figures of the French Revolution, Robespierre and Danton. Desmoulins had a love story to tie into it as well with Lucile Duplessis. Finally, Desmoulins is one of the more unknown characters in the Revolution, so Tanith Lee wanted to bring awareness to the importance of his actions. One of Lee's difficulties was that the characters were not fictional and the ending of her book had already been written by history, contrary to her usual strategy of knowing characters first and letting plots proceed from their interactions.

== Critical reception ==
Critics agreed that the Gods Are Thirsty was beautifully written despite Tanith Lee's inexperience with historical fiction. Tanith Lee is known as a science fiction writer, but The Gods Are Thirsty is an historical novel. However, critics were divided on other aspects of the book, citing for instance its length and switches between first and third person narrative which made it confusing to read and difficult to understand, the bloodiness of the narrative, and the density of the research. The Gods Are Thirsty was given a 3.3 out of 5 average customer review.
