= Venus Preserved =

Book by Tanith Lee

- Cover of Venus Preserved
- Author: Tanith Lee
- Cover artist: J. K. Potter
- Language: English
- Genre: Science fiction, Fiction, Fantasy
- Publisher: The Overlook Press
- Publication date: November 2003
- Publication place: United States
- Media type: Print (Hardback & Paperback)
- Pages: 316
- ISBN: 978-1-58567-653-8
- Preceded by: Faces Under Water (Book I), Saint Fire (Book II), A Bed of Earth (Book III)

Venus Preserved is a 2003 fantasy/science fiction novel by World Fantasy Award and British Fantasy Award winner Tanith Lee. Set in a doomed state of a fictitious, alternate Venice, Venus Preserved is the fourth installment in Lee's The Secret Books of Venus series. The novel, set centuries in the future, follows the main character, Picaro, as he follows his cursed fate to the undersea city of Venus. Over the course of the story, the city, controlled by a futuristic computer automated network, is experimenting with human revitalization, which ultimately takes a turn for an absurdly shocking worse.

== Synopsis ==
=== Part 1 ===
The reader is introduced to two main characters: Picaro, who is a professional musician and Flayd, who is an archaeologist. They both visit the underwater city of Venus and upon his arrival, Picaro meets a woman named Cora who idolizes him and his music, and he also meets a woman named India. Flayd insists that he has important information to tell Picaro. In a flashback to 2000 years ago, Jula, an ancient, undefeated, gladiatrix, thinks about her fight with Phaetho, a gladiator she defeats, and her death. Flayd keeps on trying to meet up with Picaro to tell him this important information, but Picaro isn’t interested. Eventually, Flayd informs Picaro that they are bringing back two people from the ancient times: Jula and Cloudio del Nero who is a possible bloodline to Picaro. A dinner celebration is held for Jula. Her master's comrade asks for him to have Jula. Picaro has an encounter with a woman who prophesies his death. Picaro eventually meets Cloudio del Nero and learns that he is a former musician and composer.

=== Part 2 ===
Part Two opens up with the revival of Jula within the lab. Flayd is there to accompany Jula into her new existence; meanwhile Picaro is somewhere deep in a flashback. The memories are in clear detail; he remembers how his father sat in fear of his mother across the family dinner table. He remembers how his father sent him away to keep him safe from the woman, Simoon, who they believed to be a witch. Picaro then begins reflect on the death of his father. He was just a boy sent home to reunite with his father, only met by the very woman who sent him away. In search of his father at the, Picaro finds him dead; a victim of an aneurysm. Simoon then proceeds to predict Picaro's demise by a large body of water. Picaro cannot forget this not even after Cloudio is brought back to life, a musician who shows potential to be a main antagonist.

=== Part 3 ===
In the University, Jula mistakes Picaro for the Ethiopian she killed in Stagna Maris and attacks him. Picaro, in and out of consciousness after the attack, learns from Leonillo that Cora was killed by Del Nero's germs. As Jula leaves the University with Flayd, Picaro reflects on his past and of the time he ran away from Simoon after Omberto's incident. Simoon followed him to the city he was living in, but she was sick, her organs turning to rock. She explained that this was a disease inherited from her family and from Picaro's father's, and that Picaro would eventually develop the disease in his thirties. She warned him of three signs: first, at twenty-one, he would see a man fall from the sky; second, at twenty-seven, he would see a gray dog with a pig's face; finally, at twenty-nine, a snake coiled under a flower on his pillow. She also warned that he would die underwater, but not from drowning. Later that night, in his anger, he kills her. All the signs later come true, and Picaro receives an invitation to a concert by Cloudio del Nero that seems poised to kill everyone in the audience.

=== Part 4 ===
The final book of Venus preserved focusing on the true history of Venus: fallen angels, purgatory, and religion. Characters have their true forms revealed. India, Claudio, and Picaro are angels where as everyone else, except for Flayd and Jula, are fallen angels who have forgotten their history. Stuck in purgatory and hell, Venus tells a story that rewrites Catholicism. God isn't a person but an idea. The fallen angels were given the choice to leave and take on human bodies where they would dwell in Venus. After this truth is told to Picaro, Jula, and Flayd they fight one last battle against the evil angel of death, Claudio, before sinking the great city of Venus.

== Setting ==
Far into the future in an alternate world, the city of Venus has descended into the sea, where it has been reconstructed under a dome and sustained by an infrastructure of computers. This technology is able to control the surroundings that the public sees encompassing when the sun rises and sets, holographic projections of convincing fauna and flora, air and noise regulation, and weather creation. With such technology comes an entirely novel vocabulary of words such as camerecxi, decx, linguisticx, and optecx, all of which are items incorporating computerization that is currently unfeasible in the real world. However, Lee does allude to familiar foods and clothing styles that are accepted as societal norms in the cultured society of Venus. These include Italian cuisine (e.g. grappa, absinthe, antipasto), ancient Roman dishes (e.g. roast hares, skewered peacock, braised thrushes, rose-pink lobster), and historical fashion (e.g. renaissance dresses with high waists, Victorian tailcoats, Easternized chlamys).

== Characters ==
=== Main characters ===
Picaro: He is the protagonist of Venus Preserved. He is a successful black musician also known as Magpie. He travels to Venus from the surface to pursue the deadly prophecy that has been cast upon him by his mother Simoon. He eventually saves the world of Venus from Claudio Del Nero the demonic angel by sucking up his soul.

Jula: She is a first century enslaved gladiatrix, who was named after her master, Julus. She was one of the best gladiators in her time before she died. Jula was brought back to life in the underwater city of Venus, where she meets new people and learn about her true self.

Flayd: An American archeologist for the University in Venus. He helped retrieve and reanimate Jula's corpse. He becomes one of Picaro's friends throughout the novel after he hears that the University is doing something that involves Picaro.

Cora: Picaro's love interest, and a huge fan of his music. Constantly found with her best friend India. Meets an unfortunate demise at a party where everyone died.

India: Cora's best friend, protector and a "fallen angel." India helps out Picaro, Jula, and Flayd by explaining to them know who they really are; angels as well.

Leonillo: One of the scientists at the University in Venus, who led the expedition to bring Jula and Cloudio del Nero back to life.

Cloudio del Nero: Del Nero was a very skilled musician from the eighteenth century that composed many popular pieces of music from his time. He then dies from a mysterious alchemic way. Later, he is then reanimated in the Venus Project. Being the antagonist of Venus Preserved, It turns out that he is a demonic angel. During a concert, he kills more than 2000 people of Venus with his demonic angelic aura.

Simoon: Mother of Picaro. Haunts Picaro and reminds him of a curse set upon him. She is, as India explained it, a demonic angel.

=== Minor characters ===
Talio: Another first century gladiator and Jula's rival. He was ordered to poison Jula because the powers of Rome believed she had the ability to overthrow them.

Julus: Jula's slavemaster. Jula's name is actually derived from his name. He treated Jula fairly well, however she was still nothing more than a slave to him.

Drusus and Stirius: Both guests at Julus’ party.

Phaetho: First century gladiator. He was killed in his duel against Jula. Vaguely resembles Picaro.

Jenefra: A University agent who is the only one who survived Cloudio del Nero's first performance. She was kept in a capsule to be observed.

Chossi: A physician for the University that dies during the Del Nero concert.

Dianus Schaachen: He is the alchemist that the name of the building Picaro is staying in is named after.

Furian: The distant ancestor of Picaro. He also appears in book one of the series, "Faces Under Water".

Eurydiche: She is Picaro's ancestor and she resided in Schaachen's palace. She also appears in book one of the series, "Faces Under Water".

Coal: Picaro's friend in the past and member of the Soundless Ban, who plays the korah.

Omberto: Member of Picaro's band, The Soundless Band.

Carlo: Picaro's band member.

Alessio: Wealthy and well-kept businessman, who was Picaro's friend when he was young.

== Background ==
Venus Preserved is the conclusion to Tanith Lee's four-part series, The Secret Books of Venus. The series is composed of fantasy novels including: Faces Under Water (1998), Saint Fire (1999), A Bed of Earth (2002), and Venus Preserved (2003) (The Secret Books of Venus) which are all set in an alternate version of Venice. In this series, Tanith Lee writing connects the plots of each separate book to one of each of the elements: water, fire, earth, and air (The Secret Books of Venus) in that sequential order with the books. The four different books take place in different time periods ranging from the sixteenth century all the way into the future. Many themes are covered over the course of the course of the entire series but some of the most used include: love, loyalty, apocalypse, murder, revenge, feuds, family, music, wealth, and religion.

== Critical reception ==
A short review of the novel Venus Preserved by Frieda Murray states, "Lee builds to a totally unexpected climax, not to mention an interesting afterword". She goes on to recommend this novel to acclimated science fiction readers and teens who have already read the three previous novels [Faces Under Water, Saint Fire, A Bed of Earth] of The Secret Books of Venus tetralogy. Critics agree that the writing style on this piece of literary art is "gorgeously written". The major characters are considered to be "genuine with personalities". The book did face some criticism for having "a potentially powerful futuristic science fiction novel with a strong cast that grips the reader (that) drowns by the ending". Some of the harsher reviews state that there is not an explanation as to why the main plot was happening, leaving readers wondering about the massive conspiracy and the city full of purposeless subplots.

== Publishing history ==
Venus Preserved was published in two versions in English. It was also translated into Japanese.

Language	Location	Publishing Company	Year Published	Kind of Book	Translator	Illustrator
English	NY and New York	Overlook Press	2003	Paper-covered boards, issued with pictorial dust wrapper	N/A	J.K. Potter
English	NY and New York	Overlook Press	2005	Trade paperback	N/A	J.K. Potter
Japanese	Tokyo	Sangyo Henshu Publishing	2007	Trade paperback	"Fukkatsuno Venusu" by Eiko Kakinuma	Tanno Shinobu
