= Tales from the Flat Earth =

Series of books by Tanith Lee

Tales From The Flat Earth
- First edition cover of Night's Master
- Night's Master, Death's Master, Delusion's Master, Delirium's Mistress, Night's Sorceries
- Author: Tanith Lee
- Country: United States
- Language: English
- Genre: Fantasy
- Publisher: DAW Books
- Published: 1978-1987

Tales from the Flat Earth is a fantasy series by British writer Tanith Lee. The novels take inspiration from One Thousand and One Nights and are similarly structured as interconnected stories. The series has been well received, and Death's Master, the second book in the series, won the British Fantasy Award for Best Novel in 1980.

== Works in the series ==
=== Novels and collections ===
- Night's Master (1978; nominated for the World Fantasy Award for Best Novel, 1979)
- Death's Master (1979; British Fantasy Award for Best Novel, 1980)
- Delusion's Master (1981)
- Delirium's Mistress (1986)
- Night's Sorceries (1987; nominated for the World Fantasy Award for Best Anthology/Collection, 1988)
- The Earth is Flat (2023)

=== Short stories ===
- "I Bring You Forever" (1998)
- "The Man Who Stole the Moon" (2001)
- "The Origin of Snow" (2002)
- "The Snake" (2008)
- "The Pain of Glass" (2009)
- "Our Lady of Scarlet" (2009)

== Geography of the Flat Earth ==
In the Flat Earth series, the world is a flat square, with area approximating that of the Earth. The Flat Earth floats amid formless chaos; the sun and moon rise out of the chaos in the east, travel across the upper ethers of the world, and then descend back into chaos in the west. What happens to the sun and moon while in chaos is not clear.

The cosmology of the books is composed of four "layers": the Underearth, which is the realm of demons; the Flat Earth itself; the Upperearth, which is the realm of the gods; and the Innerearth, the realm of the dead.

The Underearth is most often reached through the shaft of a gigantic extinct volcano; this shaft is guarded by three gates: the first is made of agate, the second is made of blue steel, and the third gate is made of black fire. There is only one city in the Underearth – Druhim Vanashta, the city of demons. It is made of precious minerals, gems, and metals.

The Flat Earth appears to include temperate, sub-tropical, and tropical zones, including many deserts. Since "polar" regions would be impossible on a flat world, they are not mentioned in the series. There are many seas, but bodies of water large enough to be called "oceans" do not appear to be present.

The Upperearth is an ethereal realm not visited by humans, and infrequently visited by demons. It is a blue, cloudy realm, with hazy mountains ever at the horizon but impossible to reach. One feature is a glass well that contains the water of immortality; it is guarded by two "angelic" beings. The Upperearth is inhabited by "gods" – extremely powerful, ethereal beings that are invisible, formless, genderless, and absorbed in their own thoughts. They are utterly unconcerned with the affairs of humanity, except for one or two occasions when they meted out a terrible, world-altering punishment.

== Characters ==
- Azhrarn, called "Azhrarn the beautiful", Night's Master, or Prince of Demons. Azhrarn is the ruler of the demonic Underworld and lord of all three castes of demons. Azhrarn is the most powerful of the Lords of Darkness, being the personification of wickedness (though the demons are also said to have invented love). In the mythology of the Flat Earth, Azhrarn is said to have existed before the gods created humankind, whereas the other Lords of Darkness are personifications of lesser human fears and weaknesses. Azhrarn's role in the series varies between protagonist and worker of random cruelty. In appearance, Azhrarn is an unspeakably handsome man with pale white skin, night-black hair and eyes, and black clothes. His touch provokes ecstasy. He often takes on disguised human forms or the form of a black eagle, and his black robes often unfurl in a manner suggestive of eagle's wings. Azhrarn's home and capital is the city Druhim Vanashta.
- Uhlume – called Death's Master, or Lord Death. Uhlume is the personification of death. He did not exist before the creation of humankind, as demons and gods (the inhabitants of the world before humans) are deathless. In appearance, Uhlume is a beautiful man with polished jet-black skin, milk-white hair and eyes, and white clothes. He does not relish his role as bringer of death, finding it rather boring. Uhlume also lives in the Innerearth, in a featureless, colorless desert. The only other inhabitants are the ghosts of mortals who struck bargains with him during their normal lives and are thus condemned to spend a certain time on this plane after their deaths. Eventually, he abdicates much of his role to the woman Narasen, who was a warrior queen during her lifetime.
- Chuz, called "Chuz the Mad", or Delusion's Master. Chuz is the personification of madness, and like Uhlume, did not exist before the creation of humankind. Of all the Lords of Darkness, Chuz is most likely to change shape, appearing as a beggar, servant, priest, and so on. His "true" form is that of a man who is handsome and young on his right side, and withered, ugly, and demonic on his left side. His right hand is entirely demonic: the fingers are brass snakes, and the thumb is a black beetle. Chuz typically wears white gloves and a damson-colored robe embroidered with sharp fragments of glass. He carries dice that have no markings, and the jawbones of an ass. Chuz does not have a realm; he wanders the world at will, both spreading and attracted to madness.
- Kheshmet, called "Fortune's Master". Kheshmet is the personification of fate. He appears as a king dressed in orange and gold robes, and carries a wooden staff and a large, sullen lizard. Like Chuz, he may vary his form as needed, and does not have a realm. Instead he travels where threads of fate lead him. It is not clear if he determines fate, or merely appears where strange fates occur. He plays only a minor role in the series (unless he is covertly responsible for various events).
- Azhriaz, also known as "Delirium's Mistress" and "Night's Daughter". She has also called herself or been called Soveh, Sovaz, and Atmeh. Azhriaz is the daughter of Azhrarn and a mortal woman named Dunizel. Although mortal, Dunizel was not merely human; she was infused at conception with the magical energy of the sun itself. Azhriaz is thus part demon, part human, and part solar being. Azhrarn created her with the intention of sowing mischief and woe upon the world, specifically to teach humans the folly of worshiping the gods, but she is initially unwilling to accept this role and eventually abandons it. For much of her life she and Chuz are in love. She accepts death, and her reincarnation appears in Night's Sorceries. In appearance, Azhriaz is a beautiful woman with milk-white skin, sapphire-blue eyes, and night-black hair. She appears to be about seventeen years of age, and often wears all black.
