= Night's Sorceries =

1987 book by Tanith Lee

- First edition
- Author: Tanith Lee
- Cover artist: Michael Whelan
- Language: English
- Series: Tales from the Flat Earth
- Genre: Fantasy
- Publisher: DAW Books
- Publication date: 1987
- Publication place: United States
- Media type: Print (Paperback)
- Preceded by: Delirium's Mistress
- Followed by: The Earth is Flat

Night's Sorceries (1987) is a fantasy collection by British writer Tanith Lee, the fifth volume in her series Tales from the Flat Earth. Composed of seven novellas and novelettes, it was nominated for World Fantasy Award's Best Anthology/Collection in 1988.
