= The Blood Opera Sequence =

Book series by Tanith Lee

- Cover of Dark Dance
- Dark Dance, Personal Darkness, and Darkness, I
- Author: Tanith Lee
- Language: English
- Genre: Thriller, horror
- Published: 1992-1994

The Blood Opera Sequence is a thriller/horror novel series by English writer Tanith Lee. The series consists of three novels: Dark Dance, Personal Darkness, and Darkness, I.

== Dark Dance (1992) ==
Published in 1992, Dark Dance begins The Blood Opera Sequence.

=== Plot summary ===
Rachaela is a young woman who lives alone in London, working in a meaningless job. She is apparently without friends or family until one day, she is invited to join the family of the father she has never known.

This family, known as the Scarabae, lives together in a large and luxurious but secluded house in the countryside. Aside from Rachaela, all of them appear to be old and eccentric until the day she first meets her father, Adamus. Adamus had fathered her on a woman outside the family many years ago, but he still appears to be a young man close to Rachaela's own age.

Since Rachaela's birth had broken a long pattern of sterility among the Scarabae, the family decides to continue the breeding plan by coupling her to Adamus. The resulting daughter, Ruth, is also intended for the same fate, but Ruth's unexpected madness brings death among the Scarabae and burns their ancient house around them.

Ruth flees to wreak havoc in the normal world; those events and the fate of the surviving Scarabae are told in the sequel, Personal Darkness.

== Personal Darkness (1993) ==
Personal Darkness was published in 1993 as the second book in The Blood Opera Sequence.

=== Plot summary ===
From the bookjacket: "Emerging from the burned remains of their old home, the ancient, elegant Scarabae ready themselves for a new life of seduction and feasting, until little Ruth ignites a blaze of chaos through the streets of London that threatens them all."

== Darkness, I (1994) ==
Released in 1994, Darkness, I is the third book in the series.

=== Plot summary ===
Anna and other children are kidnapped by an immortal named Cain.

=== Reviews ===
Publishers Weekly criticized the novel, saying, "Although filled with mystery and foreboding, the story takes too long to gel" and that the narrative is "mired in a decadence that impedes forward momentum."

Library Journal, however, wrote, "Lee mesmerizes the reader with her exquisite rhythm as she tells a complex tale of adventure permeated with surreal and erotic images."

== Other works ==
In addition to the novels, Lee has written a separate short story set in the same world, titled "Scarabesque, The Girl Who Broke Dracula."
