= The Unicorn Series =

Book series by Tanith Lee

The Unicorn Series is a trilogy of young adult fantasy novels by Tanith Lee consisting of Black Unicorn (1994), Gold Unicorn (1994), and Red Unicorn (1997). It follows Tanaquil, the seemingly unmagical daughter of a sorceress, who by accident brings a unicorn back to life and pursues it into another world.

== Black Unicorn ==
Black Unicorn
- Cover of Black Unicorn
- Author: Tanith Lee
- Cover artist: Heather Cooper
- Language: English
- Series: The Unicorn Series
- Genre: Young adult fantasy
- Publisher: Atheneum Books
- Publication date: 1991
- Publication place: England
- Media type: Print
- Pages: 138
- ISBN: 0-689-31575-9
- OCLC: 23693904
- LC Class: PZ7.L5149 Bl 1991

Black Unicorn (1991) is the first novel of The Unicorn Series.

=== Plot summary ===
It was big and beautiful and so black that it was like a hole in space, and it was completely impossible. Unicorns didn't belong in this world except in legends. But there it stood, radiating magical power, in the shattered wreck of the party.

Nobody knew where it had come from, or what it wanted. Not even Jaive, the sorceress, could fathom the mystery of the fabled beast. But Tanaquil, Jaive's completely unmagical daughter, understood it at once. She knew why the unicorn was there: It had come for her. It needed her.

Yet she was the girl with no talent for magic. She could only fiddle with broken bits of machinery and make them work again. What could she do for a unicorn?

This unicorn, which once was of radiant mother of pearl hue, became of this world through majestic being and wondrous magnificence.

== Gold Unicorn ==
Gold Unicorn
- Author: Tanith Lee
- Language: English
- Series: The Unicorn Series
- Genre: Young adult fantasy
- Publisher: Tor Books
- Publication date: 1994
- Publication place: England
- Media type: Print
- Pages: 244
- ISBN: 978-0-8125-4320-9
- OCLC: 34346024

Gold Unicorn (1994) is the second novel of The Unicorn Series.

=== Plot summary ===
After traveling the world, young sorceress Tanaquil begins her return home. On the way she discovers a vast army led by an empress - Lizra, Tanaquil's half-sister.

Tanaquil's magical power of mending is exactly what Lizra needs. Lizra makes Tanaquil use her talent on her giant mechanical gold unicorn, which Tanaquil learns is a war-machine that her sister is planning on using to perfect a world she sees as flawed. Tanaquil is repelled by Lizra's acts of destruction, but her attraction to Lizra's betrothed, a young man named Honj, keeps her from leaving, so she follows the unicorn, even when it leads into a terrifying alternate world.

== Red Unicorn ==
Red Unicorn
- Author: Tanith Lee
- Language: English
- Series: The Unicorn Series
- Genre: Young adult fantasy
- Publisher: Tor Books
- Publication date: November 15, 1998
- Media type: Print
- Pages: 192
- ISBN: 0-8125-3938-9

Red Unicorn (1997) is the third and final novel of The Unicorn Series.

=== Plot summary ===
Tanaquil finally returns to her mother's fortress in the desert, but only disappointment and heart-ache await her. As she contemplates leaving once again when a red unicorn appears, and she follows it into a mirror where she finds a world that exact opposite of her own, complete with a version of herself named Tanakil. As Tanaquil grapples with her twin, she faces not only the darkness of this new world, but the darkness within herself.

== Characters ==
- Tanaquil- The young daughter of a powerful sorceress. Though born to a witch mother, Tanaquil has no skills for spells and such, she instead, is a 'mender' who can fix anything and it will never break again.
- Jaive- Tanaquil's sorceress mother.
- The Peeve- Tanaquil's familiar, a desert creature similar to a mongoose or a weasel who can speak thanks to Jaive's magic.
- Lizra- A beautiful princess and Tanaquil's half-sister.
- Honj- Lizra's betrothed and Tanaquil's love interest in the story.
