= The Castle of Dark =

1978 novel by Tanith Lee

- Author: Tanith Lee
- Cover artist: Bridie Page
- Language: English
- Genre: Fantasy
- Published: 1978
- Publisher: Macmillan
- Pages: 180
- ISBN: 9780333247921
- OCLC: 6041496

The Castle of Dark is a novel by Tanith Lee published in 1978.

== Plot summary ==
The Castle of Dark is a novel in which a magical harpist seeks to rescue a maiden from a castle.

== Reception ==
Dave Langford reviewed The Castle of Dark for White Dwarf #58, and stated that "Fluid writing and effortless atmosphere make this a success."

Colin Greenland reviewed The Castle in the Dark for Imagine magazine, and stated that "Tanith Lee starts with the most traditional of material, pure Brothers Grimm; but she goes over and over it, peeling away layer after layer of assumptions and illusions, inverting our expectations of good and evil time and time again. There's nothing simple about a fairytale by the time she's told it."

== Reviews ==
- Review by Pamela Cleaver (1979) in Foundation, #16 May 1979
- Review by Faren Miller (1984) in Locus, #286 November 1984
- Review by Brian Stableford (1984) in Fantasy Review, December 1984
