= Electric Forest (novel) =

1979 novel

- First edition
- Author: Tanith Lee
- Cover artist: Jack Woolhiser
- Language: English
- Genre: Sci-fi
- Publisher: Nelson Doubleday
- Publication date: 1979
- Publication place: UK
- Media type: Hardcover
- Pages: 150
- OCLC: 5678976

Electric Forest is a novel by Tanith Lee published in 1979.

== Overview ==
Electric Forest is a novel about a disabled woman for whom a scientist provides a new body in return for her participation in an espionage effort.

== Reception ==
Greg Costikyan reviewed Electric Forest in Ares Magazine #1. Costikyan commented that "Electric Forest is more than an excellent novel - it is, in my opinion, one of the best works science fiction has so far produced, something I will reread for the rest of my life [...] The story is gripping, the writing is excellent, the plot twists are dazzling, but even more, Electric Forest turns the reader inside-out, emotionally."

== Reviews ==
- Review by Baird Searles (1979) in Isaac Asimov's Science Fiction Magazine, October 1979
- Review by Tom Easton (1980) in Analog Science Fiction/Science Fact, March 1980
