= Sabella or The Blood Stone =

1980 novel by Tanith Lee

- Author: Tanith Lee
- Language: English
- Publication date: 1980

Sabella or The Blood Stone is a novel by British writer Tanith Lee, first published in 1980.

== Plot summary ==
Sabella or The Blood Stone is a novel in which the vampire Sabella runs into trouble on colonized Mars.

== Reception ==
Dave Langford reviewed Sabella or The Blood Stone for White Dwarf #100, and stated that "The lurid fantasy and SF images mix well, like shaken oil and vinegar, but Lee eventually takes it too far by introducing a dubious SF rationale for the vampire theme [...] High marks nevertheless."

== Reviews ==
- Review by Susan M. Shwartz (1980) in Science Fiction Review, August 1980
- Review by Tom Easton (1980) in Analog Science Fiction/Science Fact, November 1980
- Review by Elizabeth Stanford (1980) in Thrust, #15, Summer 1980
- Review by Lee Montgomerie (1988) in Interzone, #23 Spring 1988
