= The Claidi Journals =

Book series by Tanith Lee

Law of the Wolf Tower
- Author: Tanith Lee
- Cover artist: Brad Gray
- Language: English
- Series: The Claidi Journals
- Genre: Fantasy
- Published: 1998 Hodder Children's Books
- Publication place: England
- Media type: Print
- ISBN: 0-340-91812-8
- OCLC: 64097345

The Claidi Journals is a fantasy novel quartet by British writer Tanith Lee. It includes Law of the Wolf Tower (1998); Wolf Star Rise (2000); Queen of the Wolves (2001); and Wolf Wing (2002). An omnibus volume of the first three novels was released in 2003.

== Law of the Wolf Tower ==
Law of the Wolf Tower (US title: Wolf Tower) is the first book in The Claidi Journals. It was written in 1998.

=== Plot ===
Claidi is a teen girl who has been raised as a maid within an isolated palace-city called "the House." The main buildings are surrounded by a manmade jungle called "the Garden." All this is cut off from the outside world by the giant "Wall."

Claidi steals a journal and begins to record her unhappy existence in the House, writing to the reader as if her journal was a long set of letters. Amongst the things Claidi notes is the House's residents' fear of the world beyond the safety of their Wall, as they believe outside is a poisonous land known as "the Waste."

Life changes for Claidi when a stranger crashes his hot air balloon into the Garden. Captured and imprisoned, he is revealed to be a handsome young man named Nemian who is clearly of foreign royal blood. The House's eldest princess calls upon Claidi and tells the girl that she is no ordinary slave, but a child born from a slave father and royal mother. The elderly princess requests that Claidi help Nemian escape.

Happy to leave the House, Claidi and Nemian steal away into the Waste. They travel on foot until they hitch a ride on a caravan of chariots. They arrive in Chariot Town, a place inhabited by people who can speak the same language as sheep, and therefore communicate and live as equals with their four-legged friends. While Nemian and Claidi's stay is pleasant enough, it is ended by bandits who raid the town.

Claidi and Nemian escape into the Waste once more, but are chased and caught by the bandits. However, the leader of the frightening group allows our heroes to go on their way unharmed.

The Sheepers bring Claidi and Nemian to a village where the residents worship in a bird cult. In a religious ceremony, the locals offer up Claidi as a sacrifice. As Claidi is about to be thrown from a cliff, the bandits arrive and save both Claidi and Nemian from their murderous hosts.

Claidi and Nemein begin travelling with the bandits, who call themselves the Hulta. It is soon revealed that the Hulta aren't true bandits, but instead are a nomadic village of traders. They are led by a young man named Argul, who becomes a love interest to Claidi.

The Hulta arrive in a technologically advanced city called Peshamba. In the city Claidi begins to fall in love with Argul. Claidi, however, is afraid of being indecisive with love and decides to leave the Hulta. She continues travelling with Nemian.

Nemian and Claidi eventually arrive in his home city, a dark and dreary metropolis ruled by the dominating Wolf Tower. The city's ruling family has been led to believe Claidi is of royal blood, so she is trained to fill the important position of the "Wolf's Paw." The Wolf's Paw is a lawmaker who creates orders by methods of dice and books. Claidi soon figures out the whole process is non-sensical.

The Hulta arrive in the city to spirit Claidi away. Claidi is overjoyed to see Argul, as she is now positive she truly loves him. Argul reveals to Claidi that when they first met, after she and Nemean fled from Sheep Town, he gazed into a magical trinket and it showed him that Claidi was his one true love. As both are sure of their feelings, Argul and Claidi become engaged to be married. Before leaving the city, however, Claidi destroys the Wolf's Paw's tools, effectively ending that method of law making.

As Argul, Claidi, and the Hulta ride away from the city, fireworks begin to go off. The people of the city, Claidi realises, are celebrating the end of the repressive laws.

== Wolf Star Rise ==
Wolf Star Rise is the second book in The Claidi Journals and was published in 2000.

Wolf Star Rise
- Author: Tanith Lee
- Language: English
- Series: The Claidi Journals
- Genre: Fantasy
- Published: 20 Jan 2000 Hodder Children's Books
- Publication place: England
- Media type: Print
- ISBN: 0-340-74647-5
- OCLC: 45327691
- LC Class: PZ7.L5149 Wk 2000b

=== Plot ===
Claidi prepares for her wedding to Argul, and is living quite comfortably with the Hulta. While bathing with the other Hulta women, she is kidnapped by men from the City. After a long journey across a sea with two men, She arrives at a place called "The Rise". The palace is full of strange creatures and mechanical slaves; rooms move at their own will and create a maze. She is told that The prince Venarion Yllar Kaslem-Idoros has brought her there at what he thinks to be her own request. Venn was given a letter saying that her name 'Cladis', and is given to fits, rages, and inventing very convincing versions of her own life. After failing in an attempt to convince prince Venn that she is telling the truth, Venn makes the terrible decision to steal Claidi's book and read it. This enrages Claidi, but ultimately bonds the two characters and puts them on a level of trust. Venn tells Claidi everything she wants to know about the palace, and she learns a great deal about his mother Ustareth and her magic/science abilities. Ustareth left her son Venn when he was nine, and stopped speaking to him when he was two. After a while in the palace, Venn suggests the two take a journey to the library, to learn about Claidi's supposed mother, Twilight Star. When they finally arrive at the library, Venn gives Claidi Ustareth's diary. She discovers that Ustareth was sent to the Rise to create the jungle that is now spreading in the major cities. They also discover that the ring which Argul gave to Claidi has Ustareth's magical properties, and that Argul is Venn's brother. Venn creates a plan to get Claidi back to Argul and the Hulta, although Claidi starts to have feelings for Venn, she decides that she truly does love Argul and goes through with the plan to take Ustareth's ship, The Wolf Star, and search for the Hulta.

== Queen of the Wolves ==
Queen of the Wolves
- Author: Tanith Lee
- Language: English
- Series: The Claidi Journals
- Genre: Fantasy
- Published: 2001 Hodder Children's Books
- Publication place: England
- Media type: Print
- ISBN: 0-340-91814-4
- OCLC: 76361199

Queen of the Wolves (US title: Wolf Queen) is the third book in The Claidi Journals and published in 2001.

=== Reception ===
In a review of Wolf Queen, Kirkus Reviews said, "Loose ends are tied up with almost painful tidiness", arguing that "while racing through the episodic plot, Lee barely sketches in the remaining characters."

=== Plot ===
After weeks of flying in the Star-ship with her servant/companion Yinyay, Claidi finally reaches the Hulta. She rushes to greet them only to find that she has been tricked – after her kidnapping, the Wolf Tower had sent Nemian to the Hulta to tell them that Claidi had arranged the balloons herself. The lie is that she was in love with Nemian all along, and wrote love letters to him asking him to take her away from Argul and bring her to the City. Because Nemian brought a fake imitation of Claidi's diary containing long passages about how much she loves and misses Nemian, and also of her "plans", the Hulta are convinced that she is a cheat and liar. They receive her with disgust and anger, and inform her that after reading her diary Argul left the Hulta forever. Blurn is now leader.

Claidi is devastated, but vows to find Argul and tell him the truth. After being informed by Dagger, who visits her in secret, that Argul went north to a town called Panther's Halt, Claidi sets out in the Star-ship.

Before she reaches the town, the Star-ship abruptly loses its power. Yinyay shrinks down to a molecular size, leaving Claidi to travel the last distance to Panther's Halt herself. Here she sees Argul during an enormous ceremony, and rushes across town to meet him. He disappears for the night, and in the morning Claidi finds out that he has ridden off on his horse. She races to follow him on a graff. While riding she realises that she is being followed by a mysterious, seemingly friendly, slightly disconcerting man named Jelly whom she met at Panther's Halt.

The two of them finally stumble upon Argul camping in a field. Claidi finds that he is completely cold and indifferent with her, and refuses to hear what she has to say. He has a short confrontation with Jelly, who reveals that he is a Wolf Tower man, culminating in Argul knocking out Jelly. Then Argul tells Claidi that she may come with him to a town further north, where he will tell her when she can talk to him. He warns her not to touch him, and the two set off.

Their trip is lonely, sad, and desperate for Claidi. Once they reach the snowy north, Claidi finally tells Argul the whole story. Much to her displeasure, he does not react at all, simply sits where he is without reacting whatsoever. Angrily Claidi leaves him to go back to her hotel, where her crying is interrupted by the entrance of a young, beautiful, powerful woman named Winter Raven. Claidi dislikes her at once, but agrees to go with her. She finds out that Winter is from the Raven Tower – a tower originally from the City that was destroyed and later rebuilt at a different location. Winter and her men have Jelly captive, for he is from the Wolf Tower which the Raven Tower despises.

During the journey Jelly tells Claidi that the Argul she had travelled with wasn't Argul at all; it was simply a mechanical doll made to look like Argul. The doll was a creation of the Raven Tower, who were apparently taught by Ustareth. Although the doll was able to move and communicate, in a complicated and emotional situation like when Claidi told her story it was unable to respond. The Raven Tower had set the whole thing up to bring Claidi to them. Claidi is made to stay with Winter although she wants to leave, and finds out that she is being taken to the Raven Tower to meet Winter's mother – Twilight Star.

The group reaches Chylomba, a town near the Raven Tower, where Claidi waits for days to meet with Twilight Star. One evening Jelly comes into her hotel room through her window, badly injured and bandaged, and gives her a letter from Ironel Novendot at the Wolf Tower. It begins by summing up the history of Ironel's family, and then informs her that, while the Wolf Tower had planned to have her kidnapped and imprisoned, Ironel had "saved" her by sending balloons of her own to take her to the Rise. Though their original plans were thwarted, the Wolf Tower still carried out the second half of their plan, tricking the Hulta into believing that Claidi was a traitor. Ironel also reveals to Claidi an even bigger surprise – upon reading her fake diary, Argul had not believed a word of it. He had such strong faith in her that he guessed the Wolf Tower's plan and left the Hulta to rescue her. He had allowed the Hulta to believe Nemian's lies to protect them from the plots of the Wolf Tower. Argul had travelled all the way to the City, where he had met Ironel and demanded the safe release of Claidi.

Jelly tells Claidi that Ironel and Argul sent him to deliver the letter to her. He leaves abruptly. The very next day Claidi is called to the Raven Tower by Twilight Star. Before she leaves, Heepo, an old servant of Venn's who was kidnapped from the Rise by lords of the Raven Tower, warns her that lords and ladies of the Raven Tower can fly using their special necklaces that cancel out gravity using magnets.

Claidi meets with Winter Raven and Twilight Star in a magnificent hall at the splendid and intimidating Raven Tower. Here Twilight Star tells her a terrible story that reveals the truth about Claidi's past: Twilight was the daughter of Jizania Tiger and Wasilwa, and grew up a lady at the House. She disliked all the rules and rituals of the place, and strove to rebel when she had the chance. As she grew up, she fell in love with her slave, Fengrey Raven. He was not just any slave; he was a Raven slave, meaning fallen royalty of the Raven Tower, whose many inhabitants were enslaved by the City and the House. Against the House's will, Twilight and Fengrey were married and had a baby. Because they violated some of the most important rules of the House – no having children without permission, no relationships between people of different rank – Twilight and Fengrey were banished to the Waste. But their unborn child was sentenced a harsh life of service in the House as a maid. To save her baby, Twilight and her mother Jizania devised a plan. When Twilight gave birth, a slave-woman did as well. Jizania took the slave's baby and forced her to lie and say it died. Twilight then made out the slave-baby as her own, allowed it to be taken from her, and then secretly brought her real child with her into the Waste.

Winter Raven is Twilight's daughter. Claidi is the unknown slave's child.

The revelation confuses and upsets Claidi, although she eventually decides that she does not care about her bloodline. Later, Twilight tells Claidi the rest of the story. She and Ustareth were apparently good friends in their youth, when Twilight and Fengrey were rebuilding the Raven Tower in the north. They admired each other for their great feats, acts of rebellion, and brilliance. They created a dream-plan together to "breed" a sort of super-human, a woman of incredible powers and abilities. It was that Twilight's daughter, obviously possessive of even greater prowess of Twilight, should marry one of Ustareth's sons, Argul or Venarion, once she had grown up. Their child would be great by far than Ustareth, Twilight, Winter, Ironel, or Jizania – a Queen of the Wolves.

This is the reason why Winter disliked Claidi so: Claidi had won over not one but both of her intendeds. But Twilight assures her that everything will work out fine in the end – Claidi will marry Argul and Winter will marry Venarion, and one of their children will be the Wolf Queen. Claidi finds the notion of being bred and used revolting.

The story's climax occurs when Jelly bursts once again into Claidi's room, this time quickly catching her into an embrace. The moment this happens Claidi knows that Jelly is Argul. The two share a whispered conversation, saying "darling" periodically to fool any Raven Tower people who may be watching through hidden cameras. Argul tells Claidi that they must convince Twilight that they trust the Raven Tower, must lie and make it seem like they will do as they say. At last they break apart, and Argul explains to Claidi how he secretly left the City and disguised himself using chemicals and creations of Ustareth. He also subtly advises Claidi to keep her wedding ring on. Twilight, Winter, and Fengrey Raven soon join the scene, greeting Argul with admiration and pleasure, commending him on clever hoax. Fengrey Raven informs them that their wedding is very soon – Twilight wants to see her Dream-plan continued.

The wedding, as Claidi calls it, is an "over-marriage", with too much extravagance and pettiness and unkind notions. It takes place in a glass hall floating in the sky, which all the Raven Tower people reach by flying. Argul tells Claidi his plan under the cover of the cheering and chatter: he tells her to touch the Raven-god-icon at the altar and then to jump over the fountain. She does so, and both Argul and Claidi suddenly fly through the ceiling and escape. Argul explains that the Raven is what is used to "recharge" the Raven Tower's flight-inducing jewellery, and that when she touched it her wedding ring was recharged. He also tells Claidi that Ironel gave him a small sapphire attachment to his glass charm that allows him to fly as well.

After a day of rest Claidi flies back to the Raven Tower to confront Twilight briefly. The two argue, and Twilight attempts to murder Claidi. Claidi's ring deflects the blow, her power leading Twilight to believe that she is the Wolf Queen. On her way back to Argul, Claidi bumps into Winter Raven, who apologises for the tricks and games of her mother. Winter also tells Claidi that her mother had ordered her to plant another Tag into Claidi's diary. Although Winter was able to access the diary, she chose not to attach the Tag. Claidi advises Winter to use her flight necklace to fly to the Rise and meet Venarion, whom she believes will be powerless against falling in love with Winter.

The story closes with the return of Yinyay, who has turned herself into a full-fledged seven floor Tower. Argul and Claidi decide to fly south in Yinyay to marry in Peshamba beneath the CLOCK.

== Wolf Wing ==
Wolf Wing
- Author: Tanith Lee
- Language: English
- Series: The Claidi Journals
- Genre: Fantasy
- Published: 12 Dec 2002 Hodder Children's Books
- Publication place: England
- Media type: Print
- ISBN: 0-340-79938-2
- OCLC: 50528009
- LC Class: PZ7.L5149 Wr 2002

Wolf Wing is the fourth and final book in The Claidi Journals series. It was published in 2002.

=== Reception ===
A review in School Library Journal commended Lee's use of Claidi's journal writing "to build suspense and provide background on characters and events from previous books", and that "complex jealousies and romantic relationships" among the main characters "adds interest and allows [them] to develop as their journey progresses".

=== Plot ===
The book begins in Yinyay's Tower, in which Claidi and Argul are flying south towards Peshamba to have their wedding. They reach Peshamba and find that they cannot be married beneath the CLOCK, for this is a custom reserved for native Peshambans. They instead are married in a quick, cold ceremony by a doll. Argul makes up for the disappointment by getting horses for Claidi and himself, and a dog named Thu for them both. While wandering about one of Peshamba's parks, Claidi comes across the Mask Grove, a place filled with hidden statue-dolls with masks. While going back to her hotel she find that they are silently following her. She is frightened, but manages to make them stay put in the square.

Claidi and Argul soon decide to fly in Yinyay back to the House to try to rescue Claidi's old slave-maid friends, Daisy, Patoo and Dengwi, from a lifetime of brutal servitude. But upon entering the Garden, they find out that after Claidi's rescue of Nemian a great Revolution had taken place among the slaves and maids of the House. Led by Jizania Tiger and Dengwi, the servants had exiled all the royals to the Waste and established a new regime. Claidi is regarded as a heroine. That evening at a Lion Night celebration of the Revolution, Claidi finds out that Jade Leaf had been kept at the House and used as Jizania's servant. It is also revealed by Jizania Tiger to the entire House that Dengwi's father was Prince Lorio, a savage royal who had been exiled during the Revolution, and her mother was a slave. This revelation hurts Dengwi deeply, for she finds association with any of the royals as an insult. Dengwi decides to fly away with Argul and Claidi.

Back at the Human Tower, Yinyay tells Claidi and Argul that a flying letter had arrived for them. It turns out to be a message from Ironel Novendot, Argul's grandmother, beseeching them to come quickly to her private house near the City so that she may tell them some crucial news. The letter tells them to make sure to bring Dengwi, and Claidi and Argul decide to go. The three arrive at Ironel's house soon, only to find that she would spend the next days refusing to tell them the crucial news. After a few days Nemian and his wife Moon Silk arrive from the City, much to the distaste and astonishment of Argul and Claidi. Mere minutes after his arrival, Prince Venarion from the Rise, his supposed girlfriend Winter Raven, and Winter's "bodyguard" Ngarbo enter through a window, windswept, weatherbeaten, and exhausted. They too had received a flying letter, and had made a long, gruelling journey from the Rise to come.

Ironel now tells the eight of them the crucial information – her daughter Ustareth is in fact alive, living in a country she had built across the southern sea. Ironel herself had found out recently, and had received instructions from Ustareth to invite Venn, Argul, Winter, Claidi, Dengwi, and Ngarbo to come to her country in Yinyay and visit her. She tells them that once they reach Ustareth's country their Power jewels, including Claidi's ring, will stop working. Ustareth also provided them with a gem encoded scientifically with the route to her country that Yinyay could read and follow.

The six begin their long journey south. During this time Venn reveals to Claidi that he came to Ironel's house to confess that he was still in love with her. Despite the fact that he and Winter were meant to be a perfect match, he found her "ridiculous" and wanted to be with Claidi. Venn also develops a prickly and argumentative relationship with Dengwi. Halfway across the sea, Yinyay's tower stops functioning and comes down in the middle of the ocean. The six stragglers are rescued by an enormous ship-tower of Ustareth's make inhabited by Sharkians. Sharkians are shark-like mammals capable of speech and living above water. But the six friends are separated as soon as they are brought aboard, and are kept apart throughout the journey. Once they reach the shores Ustareth's continent, they are dropped off at different locations.

Claidi journeys towards the center of the country with her horse Mirreen and Thu. She passes through a mysterious door in a cliff, and finds that Ustareth's country is in an enormous place of many types of landscapes. She encounters many wonders, including marble trees that provide water and strange fruit, and forests that supply meals. At one point she is nearly drowned by a river that abruptly changes course, but her ring reactivates suddenly and carries herself, Thu, and Mirreen to the surface. After this episode, Claidi is able to make herself, her horse, and Thu fly. Halfway through her journey she finds out that three of the statues from the Mask Grove are following her, and that if she looks through their eyes she can see her companions. In this way she finds out that Venn and Dengwi are travelling together, apparently friends, as are Winter and Ngarbo. Argul, like herself, is travelling alone.

At last Claidi reaches a deep valley containing Ustareth's palace – a huge golden face on the side of a mountain. Ustareth greets her and explains many things, including why she faked her own death to the Hulta. She had contracted a rare, fatal, slow-acting disease. She believed that with her talents she could cure it, but the cure would be very complicated and almost worse than the disease itself. She knew that she could devise the cure better if she was not with the Hulta. In order avoid worrying the Hulta by allowing them to see her go through the pain of the cure, she took a special potion that made her fall into a deathlike sleep and had herself buried with a mechanical servant. Later, when she woke, her mechanical servant dug her a tunnel out of the grave. She was able to cure herself, but since the disease was long term and could kill her anytime, she did not return to the Hulta for fear of getting their hopes up only to die later. Claidi finds out that Jade Leaf is at Ustareth's palace, brought there through mystical scientific means.

Ustareth also tells Claidi that her ring had never activated. Many of strange occurrences during the trip had been because her very strong and potent power. Claidi had saved her companions when Yinyay had fallen into the ocean, had caused the mysterious door to appear, and had saved herself from drowning. She had caused the marble trees to move towards her, can fly at will, and had woken up the statues. It was her own power that made it possible for see her companions. Ustareth tells Claidi that Argul is the same in some ways, like being able to make the door appear and to fly. He arrives shortly later, and Claidi has Yinyay reactivated and sent to retrieve Winter, Ngarbo, Venn, and Dengwi. When they arrive, Dengwi tells Claidi something Jizania Tiger had told her – that they share the same mother and are half sisters. Claidi is also told by Ustareth that Jade Leaf is the half-sister of Winter Raven, for Fengrey Raven is their father. It is also revealed that Venn and Dengwi have fallen in love when they share a kiss.

The story ends with Argul and Claidi deciding to return to the Hulta, whom Claidi believes will make Argul their leader again. Ustareth also explains to Claidi the origins of her name. It comes from the roots "claaii" (wolf), "i" (on the), and "dii" (wing). So "Claidi" means "Wolf on the Wing" – Wolf Wing.

== Characters ==
- Argul – A leader of the Hulta, a band of travelling thieves. He is the son of Ustareth and Kirad (a Hulta man), half-brother of Venarion, and husband of Claidi.
- Claidi – Born a slave of the House, Claidi was used to replace Twilight Star's baby to help her escape. She is the half-sister of Dengwi and wife of Argul.
- Dengwi – Half slave, half royal leader of the House. A leader of the Revolution, an old maid of Jade Leaf. Half-sister of Claidi and lover of Venarion.
- Fengrey Raven – Prince of the Raven Tower, former slave of the House. Husband of Twilight Star (the House) and father of Winter Raven.
- Ironel Novendot – Princess of the Wolf Tower, former Wolf's Paw of the City. Wife of Khiur Novendot (Wolf Tower), mother of Ustareth and Alabaster.
- Ngarbo – Man of the Raven Tower, "body guard" and old friend of Winter Raven. Later becomes Winter's lover.
- Prince Nemian – His hot air balloon is shot down by the House Guards. He takes Claidi back with him to the Wolf Tower.
- Twilight Star – A Lady of the Raven Tower, exiled from the House. Old friend of Ustareth's, wife of Fengrey Raven (Raven Tower), daughter of Jizania Tiger (Tiger Tower) and Wasilwa Star (House), mother of Winter Raven.
- Ustareth – Also known as Zeera, a Wolf Tower princess who was exiled to a desert waste that she made into the Rise. She is an incredibly talented and powerful scientist, a genius capable of flight, creating mechanical servants and lifelike dolls, generating enhanced natural landscapes, and disintegrating humans. Wife of Narisdent Vulture-Ax and Kirad, mother of Venarion and Argul.
- Venarion – Prince of the Rise, abandoned by his mother to be taken care of by dolls at age 2. Son of Narisdent (Vulture Tower) and Ustareth, half-brother of Argul, lover of Dengwi.
- Winter Raven – Originally called Claidis, princess of the Raven Tower and forbidden daughter of Twilight Star (the House) and Fengrey Raven (Raven Tower). Intended for Venarion or Argul, lover of Ngarbo, half-sister of Jade Leaf.
