= The Birthgrave =

1975 novel by Tanith Lee

The Birthgrave: Birthgrave Trilogy: Book One
- 1975 cover of The Birthgrave, first edition
- Author: Tanith Lee
- Cover artist: George Barr
- Language: English
- Genre: Science fantasy
- Published: June 1975 (DAW Books of America)
- Publication place: United States
- Pages: 408
- OCLC: 21206180
- Followed by: Vazkor, Son of Vazkor

The Birthgrave is a 1975 science fantasy novel by British author Tanith Lee. The novel was Lee's first published novel for adults, and also the first novel in The Birthgrave Trilogy. Inspired by Lee's own personal dreams from her early twenties, the story follows a nameless protagonist through various towns on a journey to discover who she really is and what she is capable of. The Birthgrave received mostly positive reviews and was nominated for the 1975 Nebula Award for best novel.

== Setting ==
The book opens in the heart of a dormant volcano and takes place in a brutal ancient world transformed by genocidal pestilence, war, fierce beauty, and cultural devastation. This world has an early medieval culture with “decadent imperial civilizations,” small city states, nomadic groups, constant little wars and skirmishes and conquests, swords and primitive cannons, multiple religions worshipping various deities, and powerful but mysterious magic. Although the main setting is mostly medieval, Karrakaz's world is later revealed to be just one of many planets visited by the mysterious “hollow star” exploration spaceship.

== Synopsis ==
The novel begins with the unnamed narrator awakening inside a volcano with no idea who she is. The story follows her quest to discover her past and her true identity. Compelled by a mysterious entity called “Karrakaz,” the narrator sets off in search of a glistening jade that may hold answers to her questions.

After emerging from the volcano, the narrator encounters a village that reveres her as a goddess due to her healing powers and her inhuman face, which she considers hideous. The leader of this village, a bandit-king named Darak, persuades the narrator to join him on his expeditions to raid a merchant caravan, trade for weapons, explore a cursed, ruined city, and compete in a deadly chariot race, leading to Darak's demise.

She continues to the cities of the White Desert and becomes the goddess of a decadent civilization fighting for the deceitful sorcerer-conqueror Vazkor, who uses the narrator as his instrument of power. However, thanks to Vazkor, the narrator learns about her people, a long-lost omnipotent civilization of Old Ones who once ruled the world as cruel, arbitrary gods. In the end, she also kills Vazkor.

Leaving the cities, she is enslaved by a tribal krarl, gives birth to Vazkor's son, wanders onward, battles a dragon, and encounters a spaceship from a distant advanced civilization. The spaceship computer reveals the narrator's forgotten past. Karrakaz, the entity that spoke to her in the volcano, is actually part of herself—her lost name—and she was a princess of the Old Ones, who were wiped out by a plague at the height of their power. She sought refuge within a volcano temple and lay dormant for 16 years. Ultimately, her guilt at the evil of her race caused her to create Karrakaz as an alternate personality commanding her to destroy herself. In the end, at peace with herself, Karrakaz discovers the jade she sought in her own forehead, and learns that behind the mask, her face is not hideous, but unimaginably beautiful.

== Characters ==
- Narrator: The heroine, an amnesiac member of an ancient race with incredible powers, always masked.
- Karrakaz: A mysterious voice that speaks to the narrator, urging her to die.
- Darak: Leader of the bandits and hill people, an excellent charioteer, and the narrator's lover.
- Giltt, Kel, and Maggur: The narrator's first bodyguards/followers.
- Asutoo: Part of the tribe called The Dark Ones. Fell in love with the narrator and revealed the true identity of Darak to the Warden of Arkunum. Because of this, he was killed by the narrator.
- Uasti: She was the caravan healer. She was killed by the girl she owned.
- Javhovor: Vazkor wants the narrator to marry him, raise his child, and get the Old Ones back.
- Arsen: The first Javhovor the reader meets. Marries the narrator to please the people. Had no further interest in her.
- Vazkor: The Javhovor of Ezlann (after he supposedly murdered Arsen), conqueror and deceiver. Used the narrator as an instrument of power, and even fathered a child with her.
- Mazlek: Head of the narrator's bodyguards. Faithful and loyal to her until the end.

== Background ==
When writing The Birthgrave in 1975, Tanith Lee changed her genre to adult fiction and focused on planetary romance. The novel was inspired by Tanith Lee's experience of waking up from a dream in her early twenties haunted by mental images of a white female curled up inside of a live volcano, images which led to a fascination with the protagonist and later to the opening paragraph in the novel. With the publication of The Birthgrave by DAW, Tanith Lee entered the science fiction field, and her career rapidly took off thanks to the emotional depth of her narrative and her female protagonists.

=== Writing process ===
The Birthgrave was written by Tanith Lee around the age of 22; her mother typed the manuscript. Much of the novel is based on Lee's own dreams where she was in the place of its narrator, which she describes as, ”we rose from fire and from death, fell deep into passions of love, raced the chariots…and withered and regained our destiny." When she first dreamed of the book's heroine, Lee described her as “white as ice, unknown to me as the back of the moon". Lee usually doesn’t plan out her stories, often starting with creating the characters and “just writing” the story around their personalities. The process of writing, Lee stated in a 2009 interview, usually takes about two weeks for her novels. Tanith Lee's influences when writing mainly come from music, literature, film, and prominent public figures. The Birthgrave was Lee's first adult novel, but was initially rejected by many publishers until it was picked up by DAW Books of America, launching her career After reading fantasy novelist Jane Gaskell's “The Serpent” and noticing that she didn’t stick to the typical Real World setting, Lee was influenced to do just the same. She was also very fascinated by Gaskell's take on sexual romance and psychology and how she flowed the two different writing styles into one ^{[14]}. DAW was very interested in her story and chose to publish her, which turned out to be quite the success^{[15]}.

== Creation ==
Lee had just finished a year at art college and had been taking minor jobs, such as waitressing and shop work. She had been in a bookstore, looking through books published by DAW, whom she admired. She then had a thought of why not taking a chance and sending one of her own stories to DAW to be published. That story was “The Birthgrave” and its creation came from her very own imagination. The opening scene was formed from the mental image of a woman being curled up in a ball inside a volcano, which was based on a strange awakening Lee had in her early twenties After reading fantasy novelist Jane Gaskell's “The Serpent” and noticing that she didn’t stick to the typical Real World setting, Lee was influenced to do just the same. She was also fascinated by Gaskell's take on sexual romance and psychology and how she flowed the two different writing styles into one DAW was very interested in her story and chose to publish her, which turned out to be quite the success.

== Critical reception ==
Following its publication in 1975, The Birthgrave was met with favorable reviews, and continues to be widely praised today . Critics have praised its “genius”, emotional depth, uniqueness and Lee's immense talent at creating a fluent and imaginative map for the reader through a sword and sorcery epic plot. "Many of exciting conventions included show blood-and-thunder pulp fantasy without making the reader feel cheated. That is, I did not feel as if I'd been lied to -- being promised a sword-and-sorcery story and then given something else entirely." Critics reveal that the author effortlessly sustains both ultramodern and primeval genre's integrity of the world she has created, no matter how unusual or unique her writing approach may be. Its literary elements succeed within the service of The Birthgrave's story and its authentic characters, which embellish her cross-genre ability. Although some have objected that the plot is repetitive and predictable, critics are near-unanimous in praising the prose and the memorable female protagonist, who is the first in a series of widely praised protagonists in Lee's writing.

== Themes ==
Critics have noted numerous themes in The Birthgrave, particularly the theme of power. Within the different societies the narrator encounters, the image of a healer recurs. The narrator takes on the role of the healer in these societies and then abuses her ranking and her use of power to control the societies. While the narrator travels through the different societies, gender issues affect the narrator while she stays in these societies. The narrator also struggles with self-discovery, trying to find out who she was and how her race became extinct. The Washington Post noted Birthgrave as a novel featuring "vigorous heroines, often a warrior or a sorceress” who eventually finds herself as she travels on her quests.

== Writing style ==
Critics have highly regarded Tanith Lee's writing style; her style crosses new boundaries in a fantasy setting. Lee's writing focuses mainly on fantasy and science fiction. Her writing features very complex writing and emotions. Her books often show a “sword and sorcery” genre with battling for oneself and battling for love. Her style is able to capture the reader and is often described as having “the talent and ability for painting with words”. Readers and viewers have also described Tanith Lee's writing, especially for The Birthgrave, as having “hidden humor”. The Birthgrave’s symbols are most prominent as a “sword and sorcery.”

== Publication history ==
- Mass market paperback, 408 pages, published September 1977 by Orbit
- Published December 1981 by DAW Books DAW Book No. 463, mass market paperback, 408 pages
- Published 17 June 1981 by DAW, paperback, 408 pages
- Published 10 November 2010 by Taleka, paperback, 554 pages
- Published 1 November 2010 by Taleka, hardcover, 554 pages
