= Dreams of Dark and Light: The Great Short Fiction of Tanith Lee =

Book by Tanith Lee

- Dust-jacket illustration by Max Ernst for Dreams of Dark and Light
- Author: Tanith Lee
- Illustrator: Douglas Smith
- Cover artist: Max Ernst
- Language: English
- Genre: Fantasy, Science fiction, Horror short stories
- Publisher: Arkham House
- Publication date: 1986
- Publication place: United States
- Media type: Print (hardback)
- Pages: ix, 507 pp
- ISBN: 0-87054-153-6
- OCLC: 12945696
- Dewey Decimal: 823/.914 19
- LC Class: PR6062.E4163 D7 1986

Dreams of Dark and Light: The Great Short Fiction of Tanith Lee is a collection of fantasy, horror and science fiction stories by author Tanith Lee. It was released in 1986 and was the author's first book published by Arkham House . It was published in an edition of 3,957 copies.

== Contents ==
Dreams of Dark and Light contains the following tales:

1. "Foreword", by Rosemary Hawley Jarman
2. "Because Our Skins Are Finer"
3. "Bite-Me-Not or, Fleur de Fur"
4. "Black as Ink"
5. "Bright Burning Tiger"
6. "Cyrion in Wax"
7. "A Day in the Skin (Or, The Century We Were Out of Them)"
8. "The Dry Season"
9. "Elle Est Trois, (La Mort)"
10. "Foreign Skins"
11. "The Gorgon"
12. "La Reine Blanche"
13. "A Lynx With Lions"
14. "Magritte's Secret Agent"
15. "Medra"
16. "Nunc Dimittis"
17. "Odds Against the Gods"
18. "A Room With a Vie"
19. "Sirriamnis"
20. "Southern Lights"
21. "Tamastara"
22. "When the Clock Strikes"
23. "Wolfland"
24. "Written in Water"
