= Tempting the Gods =

Book by Tanith Lee

Tempting The Gods: The Selected Stories of Tanith Lee, Volume One
- Author: Tanith Lee
- Cover artist: Rita Isabel
- Language: English
- Genre: Fantasy
- Publisher: Wildside Press
- Publication date: February 2009
- Publication place: United States
- Media type: Print (hardback)
- Pages: 258 pp
- ISBN: 978-0-8095-5765-3

Tempting The Gods: The Selected Stories of Tanith Lee, Volume One is a 2009 collection of 12 fantasy and science fiction short stories by author Tanith Lee, published by Wildside Press. Only one story, '"God and the Pig", is a previously unpublished work. The book includes Lee's very first published short story, "Eustace", originally issued in 1968. The book includes an introduction by Donald Wollheim.

The story "The Lady of Shalott House" was nominated for a British Science Fiction Award, and "Where Does the Town Go at Night?" was nominated for a British Fantasy Award.

Volume Two of this collection, titled Hunting The Shadows, was released in December 2009.

== Contents ==
Tempting the Gods contains the following tales:

- "Tiger I"
- "Death Loves Me"
- "Anna Medea"
- "Ondralume"
- "After I Killed Her"
- "God and the Pig"
- "The Kingdoms of the Air"
- "Eustace"
- "These Beasts"
- "Cain"
- "The Lady of Shalott House"
- "Where Does the Town Go at Night?"
