= Delusion's Master =

1981 book by Tanith Lee

- First edition cover.
- Author: Tanith Lee
- Series: Tales from the Flat Earth
- Genre: Fantasy
- Publisher: DAW Books
- Publication date: 1981
- Pages: 208
- ISBN: 0886771978
- Preceded by: Death's Master
- Followed by: Delirium's Mistress

Delusion's Master (1981) is a fantasy novel by British writer Tanith Lee, the third book in her Tales From The Flat Earth.
