= Night's Master =

1978 novel by Tanith Lee

- First edition
- Author: Tanith Lee
- Illustrator: George Barr (1978); Alicia Austin (1985)
- Cover artist: George Barr (1978); Alicia Austin (1985)
- Language: English
- Series: Tales from the Flat Earth
- Genre: Fantasy
- Publisher: DAW Books
- Publication date: 1978
- Publication place: United States
- Media type: Print (Paperback)
- ISBN: 1607620448
- Followed by: Death's Master

Night's Master is a 1978 fantasy novel by British writer Tanith Lee, the first in the Tales from the Flat Earth series. It has been translated into Dutch, Italian, French, German and Spanish. It was published with illustrations by George Barr in 1978 and by Alicia Austin in 1985. It was nominated for a World Fantasy Award for Best Novel in 1979.

== Plot summary ==
=== Part One ===
Azhrarn, Prince of Demons, falls in love with the mortal boy Sivesh and raises him in Azhrarn's kingdom, the Underearth. Sivesh longs for the surface of the earth and ultimately for the sun, which is fatal to Azhrarn. Even Azhrarn's creation of a beautiful woman, Ferazhin, does not satisfy Sivesh. Eventually Sivesh remains on earth and Azhrarn tricks him to his death.

A grotesque minor demon called a Drin makes seven of Ferazhin's tears into a necklace. Azhrarn takes it to the earth, where desire for it creates mischief, as he hoped. It finally comes into the hands of the blind poet Kazir, who intuits its nature and enters the Underearth. Azhrarn offers to let him meet Ferazhin if he can name anything Azhrarn needs. Kazir shows him in a song that he needs humanity, his plaything. Kazir and Ferazhin spend a happy year together, till Azhrarn causes Ferazhin's death, but Kazir brings her back with a song.

=== Part Two ===
Azhrarn overthrows a vainglorious king. Zorayas, one of the king's daughters, survives but is horribly disfigured by injuries. After suffering humiliation and rape and learning her parentage, she ruthlessly regains her father's kingdom. To avenge herself on Azhrarn, she tricks him into remaining above ground after sunrise in a dome simulating the night sky, but releases him when he makes her peerlessly beautiful.

Becoming used to getting whatever she likes, she wants a collection of diamonds that are cursed if stolen. They are owned by two brothers. She makes one of them fall in love with her and give her the diamonds, but then she spurns him and he dies. The surviving brother gives her a magic mirror that makes her fall in love with her image; when she tries to embrace it, she annihilates herself.

=== Part Three ===
Azhrarn tries to seduce an engaged girl and is rejected. In retaliation, after her groom impregnates her on their wedding night, he has a Drin turn the groom into a monster. Furthermore, another demon separates the male part of her daughter's soul from the female part, and has the male part animate a still-born baby far away. The baby girl, Shezael, grows up beautiful but passive, while the baby boy, Drezaem, grows up wild, victorious in every fight, and unmatchably virile. When Shezael comes into possession of a strand of Drezaem's hair (attached to a traveling minstrel's harp), she searches for him, unaccountably finding the way and surmounting every obstacle. Azhrarn tries to keep them apart, but at last they join each other and he gives them his blessing.

The monstrous bridegroom is restored to humanity and named Qebba by a magician, Kaschak. At first a good servant, he comes to resent Kaschak and fights him with the magic he has learned. Kaschak cannot destroy him but imprisons him on a remote island, where Qebba's hate increases without limit. When he dies, he becomes a disembodied spirit, Hate, who causes all kinds of violence over the earth. Eventually humankind is about to become extinct, so Azhrarn, remembering Kazir's song, sacrifices himself by exposing himself to sunlight and thus overcomes Hate with love. Without Hate and the Prince of Wickedness, humanity enters an Age of Innocence, but Azhrarn is reborn, ending it.

== Reception ==
Susan L. Nickerson praised Lee's "mastery of the English language" and noted the "pervading mood of the book... unearthly beauty", unlike Lee's previous works.

David Langford called this book and its sequel "very atmospheric".
