= The Book of the Damned (Tanith Lee) =

1988 book by Tanith Lee

- Author: Tanith Lee
- Cover artist: Peter Goodfellow
- Language: English
- Genre: Fantasy, horror
- Published: 1988
- Publisher: Unwin Paperbacks
- Pages: 229
- ISBN: 9780044401513
- OCLC: 17619975

The Book of the Damned is a 1988 fantasy/horror novel by World Fantasy Award winner Tanith Lee. It is the first book in her Secret Books of Paradys series. Set in Paradys, an alternative version of Paris, it takes place in three novellas set in different periods in the city's dark history.

== Synopsis ==
The Book of the Damned consists of three short novellas set in Paradys, an alternate world version of Paris: Stained with Crimson, Malice in Saffron, and Empires of Azure. Each novella focuses around a single color; with each transition between novellas, the era and color and writing style change, but themes of dark magic, murder, love, gender, and identity persist. Each novella "centers visually on a stained glass window... [whose] colors are reflected in three pieces of ancient jewelry: a ruby scarab ring, a topaz crucifix plundered during the crusades[,] and an Egyptian sapphire earring shaped like a spider. Each jewel is fateful for its possessor".

=== Stained With Crimson ===
Stained With Crimson is the story of Andre St. Jean, a poet in 19th-century Paradys, who is given a ruby scarab ring by a mysterious stranger and falls in love with Antonina, a sinister noblewoman who only comes out at night. Following the death of Philippe, Andre's friend and occasional lover, Antonina and Andre begin an affair, and Antonina bites Andre. Antonina falls sick and dies mysteriously, and her brother Anthony arrives demanding the scarab ring from Andre and challenging him to a duel, where Andre is killed by a silver bullet. Andre soon awakens, as Anna Sanjeanne, leaves Paradys for the countryside following Anthony—who is revealed to be Antonina, similarly transformed by the scarab ring. They renew their affair in different bodies; Anthony dies; Antonina returns; the cycle continues.

=== Malice in Saffron ===
Malice in Saffron presents a story during the medieval times era of violence and the abuse of women. The main character, Jehanine, is brutally raped by her stepfather, Belnard. One of her brothers goes after her and tries to rape her so she fights back and knocks him out under a tree where he is left naked. She flees to the city of Paradys along with a dwarf named Fero and finds her brother, Pierre, who does not believe her after she tells him what her stepfather did to her. Seeking shelter in a nunnery, Jehanine leads a dual life: by day she is Jehanine/Jhane, while by night she disguises herself as a boy, Jehan, a murderous burglar who works with a gang of thieves. She uses the group of thieves to get revenge on Pierre who gets mugged by them. Here, Jehan steals a crucifix necklace with a yellow topaz embedded in it. It is the only prize kept by the character during their plunders. Osanne, a novice nun, realizes that there is evil in Jhane (Jehanine) and tries to help her. Later, Osanne's corpse is found disemboweled inside a well. Jehan, then, confronts Master Motius, an artisan and Pierre's teacher. Master Motius recognizes Jehan as a sibling of Pierre and showed Jehan Pierre's his works, but Jehan sets his works on fire along with Master Motius while escaping from a window. After numerous murders, sexual assaults and an encounter with a demon, Jehanine repents her violent ways as the city falls to a demon-inflicted plague. Tending her plague-stricken brother, she rips off her arm and feeds it to him to save his life and finds a sort of redemption. When Pierre wakes up, he has a vision that mankind is doomed.

=== Empires of Azure ===
Empires of Azure is narrated by St Jean, a journalist. The story is about Louis de Jenier, a celebrated female impersonator in early 20th-century Paradys who discovers a spider-shaped sapphire earring in his new house and becomes haunted by a ghost named Timonie, all the while imprisoned by his manager and bodyguard. Louis' friends, Curt and Vlok, attempt to save Louis by moving him away from the Paradys. Louis is in the hospital, but it is too late for anyone to save him. The sorceress turns out to be Tuamon/Tiyamonet, who possesses Louis. Jenier then dies. St Jean confronts Tuamon and in the end Tuamon has to finish the journal that Jenier started.

== Characters ==
=== Stained With Crimson ===
- Andre St Jean/Anna Sanjeanne: A poet from Paradys, he is given a crimson scarab ring by a mysterious stranger, falls in love with the elusive Antonina, is killed by her brother Anthony (actually Antonina herself), and returns as Anna Sanjeanne.
- Philippe: Andre's best friend from childhood and secret lover. After death, he is turned into an infant.
- Anna Sanjeanne: The female reincarnation of Andre.
- Antonina: A noblewoman in Paradys. She is seen only at night, has pitch black eyes, and later bites Andre. She is plagued with illness and dies. She is revived as her male counterpart, Anthony.
- Anthony: Male reincarnation of Antonina after she becomes ill and dies.

=== Malice in Saffron ===
- Jehanine: A young peasant girl who is raped by her stepfather, she runs away to Paradys to be with her brother but is abandoned and left alone and hides in a convent.
- Jehan: Jehanine in male disguise; only comes out at night and is a savage thief and killer.
- Pierre: Jehanine's brother, he refuses to help Jehanine when he hears about her rape, is later beaten by thieves at her behest, and nearly dies of plague.
- Osanne: A nun from the convent Jehanine comes across, who takes her in and gives her a saffron crucifix.
- Dwarf: A dwarf who leads Jehannine to the nunnery when her brother abandons her.

=== Empires of Azure ===
- Louis: A writer who is assigned to record what happens in a house haunted by past spirits.
- Timonie: One of the spirits who haunts the house in Paradys where Louis is working.
- Tiyamonet/Tuamon: The other spirit who haunts the house where Louis is working; an ancient Egyptian sorceress.
- Manager: Kurt

== Setting ==
=== Stained With Crimson ===
- Takes place in the 19th-century French city of Paradys. The city is based on Paris, and has carriages that are a source of transportation. It also contains a pub where its people can grab a drink and talk.

=== Malice in Saffron ===
- Takes place in the city of Par Dis, France, in the early 1300s. The book begins on a farm and later moves into the city.

=== Empires of Azure ===
- Takes place in the city of Paradis in the 1930s or 1940s. Just as in the other books, the city is based on Paris in the early 20th century. It features automobiles, a police force, trains, and hospitals.

== Background and writing process ==
While writing The Book of the Damned, Lee was already an award-winning horror writer. She created another world that involved demons, vampires and supernaturals. Lee said that her writing process came naturally to her; she didn't plot her stories out before writing them, but rather started with an idea, and the rest just came to her. "All ... [she] need[ed] [to] do is dive in for a swim," and if she couldn't think of a certain detail, she went to her "backbrain," which poured out all of the unknown to her.

== Themes and writing style ==
In these three stories, the emphasis of color and gender change bring out the evil and darkness. The shades of red, yellow and blue pop out in the world painted black and white, and "all three [colors] portray physical and spiritual attractions, changes of sex, either through impersonation, transformation or androgyny". While the novellas are connected by their themes of death, rebirth, identity, and the usage of color schemes that represent each novella, "love or the longing for it is the central motif of the book". Lee uses changes of sex, and spiritual changes throughout all three novellas. All of the novellas have a source of identity, and there are many character changes throughout the novellas. Each story has a precious jewel that describes its mood. Stained with Crimson has a ruby scarab ring; Malice in Saffron has a topaz crucifix; and Empires of Azure has a sapphire earring.

Critics have described Lee's work as "prolific... and highly descriptive, drawing heavily on folk tale, often inverting the well-known outcome to produce something altogether more disturbing". Her style has been described as "lush, vibrant, exotic, elegant, perverse, and darkly beautiful." The stories demonstrate Gothic backgrounds, complete with the use of demons, ghosts, and transformation of genders.

== Awards ==
Critics describe The Book of the Damned as erotic, horror-filled, grim and dark, its three novellas united by the setting of Paradys, and praise Lee's use of language and imagination. Because of this, The Book of the Damned was nominated in 1989 for a Locus Award in the category of Best Collection, and placed 15th of 25. It has not been nominated for any other awards since then.

== Critical reception ==
In The Black Letters, The Book of the Damned was reviewed by a reviewer named Emera, who stated that the book was very well written due to the Gothic style of the novellas and the recurring themes. "The Secret Books of Paradys are among the most exquisitely aestheticized and unabashedly Gothic works I've ever read."

The recurring themes in The Book of the Damned seem to be an important catch to readers. The books are also often praised by critics for their uniqueness in regards to writing style, setting, themes and their general departure from the typical horror novel.

Booklist Review critic Roland Green said, "The whole work is an astonishingly good mix of horror, historical fantasy, and intense but well-handled eroticism... all of which no fantasist but Lee could probably achieve."

Pat Royal from the School Library Journal Review in Crossland High School, Camp Springs, Maryland commended Lee on her creative language, also advising readers that The Book of the Damned is not for everyone.

== Publication history ==
Type of book	Publisher	Country published	Year published	Price	Language	Cover artist
Trade issue	London Sydney Wellington: Unwin Paperbacks (imprint of Unwin Hyman Limited)	Great Britain	1988	£6.95	English	Peter Goodfellow
Limited edition (250 signed copies)	London Sydney Wellington: Unwin Paperbacks (imprint of Unwin Hyman Limited)	Great Britain	1988	£45.00	English	Uncredited
Hardcover	The Overlook Press	New York, United States	1990	$19.95	English	Wayne Barlowe
Paperback	The Overlook Press	New York, United States	1997	$13.95	English	Wayne Barlowe
Trade paperback - Empires of Azure	Arnoldo Mondadori Editore	Milan, Italy	1991	N/A	Italian (translated by Maria Grazia Griffini)	Stephan Hickman
Paperback (Paradeisu No Hi Roku Ochi Taru Mono No Kaki)	Kadokawa Shoten	Tokyo, Japan	1992	¥2,500	Japanese (translated by Sayako Asabca)	Mari Kotani
