= Delirium's Mistress =

1986 book by Tanith Lee

- First edition cover of Delirium's Mistress
- Author: Tanith Lee
- Language: English
- Series: Tales From The Flat Earth
- Genre: Fantasy
- Publisher: DAW Books
- Publication date: 1986
- Preceded by: Delusion's Master
- Followed by: Night's Sorceries

Delirium's Mistress (1986) is a fantasy novel by British writer Tanith Lee, the fourth book in her series Tales From The Flat Earth.

== Plot summary ==
During the demon's age, when the planet was still flat, Azhriaz, daughter of Azhrarn, Demon Lord of the Night and a mortal, was hidden on an isle surrounded by mist and her spirit was protected to live forever in dreams. But Azhriaz's destiny is about to change unexpectedly. Her powerful energy and beauty attracted Azhrarn’s enemy, Prince Chuz, who created a spell to free Azhriaz from her confinement and convert her into the Delirium’s Mistress.
