= The Lionwolf Series =

Book series by Tanith Lee

- First edition cover of Cast a Bright Shadow
- Cast a Bright Shadow, Here In Cold Hell, No Flame but Mine
- Author: Tanith Lee
- Country: United States
- Language: English
- Genre: Fantasy
- Publisher: Tor Books
- Published: 2005-2007

The Lionwolf Series is a fantasy novel trilogy by British writer Tanith Lee, consisting of:

- Cast a Bright Shadow (2005)
- Here In Cold Hell (2006)
- No Flame but Mine (2007)

The Lionwolf series has been described as a "Sword and sorcery" trilogy by fantasy historian Steve Tompkins.
