= Don't Bite the Sun =

1976 novel by Tanith Lee

- Cover of Don't Bite the Sun
- Author: Tanith Lee
- Cover artist: Brian Froud
- Language: English
- Genre: Science fiction, Utopian fiction, Dystopian fiction
- Publisher: DAW Books
- Publication date: 1976
- Publication place: United Kingdom
- Media type: Print
- Pages: 158
- ISBN: 9780879974862
- Followed by: Drinking Sapphire Wine

Don't Bite the Sun is a 1976 science fiction novel by Tanith Lee set in a utopian world which the main character comes to reject. The main character and her friends are wild, crazy "Jang" teenagers whose lifestyle is full of reckless behaviour, promiscuous sex, repeated suicide (upon dying, they are reborn), and a constant search for thrills. Over the course of the story, the nameless narrator fails to relate to her seven Jang friends but finds herself, feels emotion, and learns love.

== Synopsis ==
=== Setting ===
On a desert planet in the distant future, humanity inhabits three domed utopian cities: Four-BEE, Four-BOO, and Four-BAA. Humans have no responsibilities; their daily needs are served by quasi-robots which even run the government through a Committee. Young humans known as "Jang" are rigidly expected to do whatever they please, indulge in various forms of drugs, have sex (as long as they marry first, even if it is just for the afternoon), and live for their own pleasures. They can visit, have their dreams constructed for them, buy or steal anything they want at will, and even sabotage the city (though the robots instantly repair any damage). Robots handle everything, and nothing is left for the humans to do. Nor can they die in any meaningful sense; when they do, they are resurrected in a body customised to their wishes.

=== Technology ===
People can change bodies every thirty "units" (days) or commit suicide if they want a change before the allotted time. They can be male or female, and body designs can get very fanciful, with wings and antennae frequently worn. They can travel by bird plane or bubbles on waterways, or teleportation through a Body Displacer. Travel between the cities is by sky-boat, a large floating cruise vessel, or sandship, a cruiser that hovers just off the ground. News is transmitted via "flashes," perhaps on public screens at various points in the cities and on viewscreens in private homes. "Picture-Vision" is an endless transmission of artistic images on film, both live-action and animation, usually plotless erotica; when the narrator tries to create an animated Picture-Vision piece in her search for work, she's told it's good, but has too much of a story to it. Android or quasi-android animals are common as pets, but real animals are also not unusual. Children go to hypno-school to learn complex math that will never be used again except in meditation, all while completely asleep. The cities are completely climate-controlled. Consumer goods and services are paid for through emotional energy; one goes into a pay booth and expresses fervent, enthusiastic gratitude, often aided by drugs. Outside the domes, however, lies uninhabitable desert, plagued with sandstorms, volcanic eruptions, and furry, long-eared, egg-laying beasts that wander the great expanses.

=== Plot ===
The book opens with the narrator visiting Hergal, a close friend, after his fortieth suicide-by-birdplane. Offended by his insensitivity, she kills herself, then, in a new body, embarks on a series of mundane attempts to amuse herself, including stealing a white fluffy desert animal that she keeps as a pet, programming elaborate dreams for herself, having unsatisfying sex with her peers, and employing a wide variety of legal drugs. Incapable of making emotional connections with anyone, she finds her life increasingly unsatisfying, though her demanding and difficult pet does interest her.

Soon after going through the mundane rituals of her life the narrator feels like she should not be a Jang teenager any more. However, the quasi-robots who run the city determine that she is not ready to become an older person. Soon she tries looking for a useful job, but to no avail: robots and computers perform every useful task. She then attempts to have a child, but is unable to find a suitable partner, tries to have a child with herself by taking a male body, and ends up causing the child to die. Unable to fill the emptiness she feels, she joins an expedition to explore the deserts outside the city. During this expedition, the narrator realises the beauty of life outside of the domes and she gains a strong emotional connection with her stolen pet. However, it is then accidentally killed, devastating her. Upon returning to the city, she is still unable to make lasting emotional connections with her peers. She considers death and wonders if she really belongs in the city or somewhere else.

=== Drinking Sapphire Wine ===
In this sequel, the narrator has spent the past several years in male form and studying ancient history, learning the art of swordsmanship as a pastime. His friend Danor returns from the city of Four-BAA; their circle of friends gathers to welcome her, and the narrator deceives them and escapes with Danor to his home. Danor has had an illegal affair with an older person, Kam, whom she still loves. Infuriated at the trick, another circle member, Zirk, challenges the narrator to a duel. The narrator's superior skill wins the bout, but he commits the supreme crime by killing Zirk (even though Zirk is resurrected). For her intent while committing the crime, the narrator is given a choice between having her mind wiped and having to start life anew (Ego Death), or being sentenced to exile outside the domes (until natural death, at which point they are to be recollected, wiped, and renewed). Demanding a refitted sandship, a luxury cruiser ordinarily used to travel between cities, the narrator (now female) tries to reconnect with the desert, including befriending local wildlife. A little "Grey-Eyes" creature falls into the food/water processor, and while it's unharmed, the processors explode. When the resulting spout of water irrigates the surrounding desert into blooming life, the narrator decides to cultivate the "garden" and demands equipment from the city, whose "news flash" teams create a documentary with her permission. Danor and Kam arrive, having chosen exile even before the film so they can be together; Jang teens soon follow, and the quasi-robot government forms a plan to quell the rapidly growing out-dome community.

== Characters ==
=== Jang ===
- Danor – A friend of the narrator's who loses the ability to "have love" successfully and becomes celibate, surrounded by adoring fans. Predominantly female. She later finds connection and joy with Kam, an Older Person, but their relationship is forbidden.
- Hatta – An unusual character. Unlike the other Jang members, Hatta is not obsessed with outward beauty but instead focuses on individualism, going so far as to always be physically ugly. Loves the narrator and wants her to accept him for his inward beauty.
- Hergal – A young Jang male fascinated with suicide, sex, and ecstasy. Bird-plane enthusiast.
- Kley – A friend of the main character, tending to be sadistic and bullying as a woman, shy and retiring as a man.
- Zirk – A member of the narrator's circle, although they dislike each other. As a female, usually small, delicate and twee: as a male, usually huge, muscular, short-tempered and loud.
- Lorun – The epitome of a Jang male. The narrator falls in love with him while she searches for a suitable parent for her child-to-be.
- Sarl – Lorun's Jang friend.
- Narrator – The main character, predominantly female. She has only known the Jang way of life, but tires of it and wants more out of life. As a female, she often chooses exotic beauty; as a male, favors robust, competent bodies or slender "poetic" forms.
- Thinta – Predominantly female and one of the narrator's close friends, she is fussy and anxious but has a warm, caring demeanor. She loves cats and would like a more catlike body but is told this is impossible. Her name is an anagram of "Tanith".

=== Older people ===
- Glar Assule – A self-styled archaeologist who sets out to explore desert ruins on an expedition (a glar is a professor or teacher).
- Narrator's Makers – Both male older people who created the Narrator and looked after her until after she graduated from hypno-school.
- Kam – An older male from BAA who develops a committed bond with Danor. A very steady, knowledgeable, resourceful but romantic character, he favors blue and violet colors.

=== Other ===
- Pet – The pet is a possession of value for the main character. It has white fur, whiskers and orange eyes. It resembles a dog, but has six legs.
- Quasi-Robot – The Quasi-Robot is an android, a robot that has human qualities and may even pass for a human.
- Quasi-Robot Medicine Man – The Quasi-Robot Medicine Man is there when the main character wakes up in Limbo. Another assists her when she asks to be examined to see if she is ready to graduate to Older Person status.
- Grey-Eyes – Technically named binnimasts, they are desert animals, yellow with brown ruffs and grey eyes, look adorable, and travel in groups. The narrator attempts to make a pet of one.

== Context ==
Tanith Lee wrote Don’t Bite the Sun in the early 1970s, and it represents the New Wave of science fiction, in which feminist writers played a substantial role. Fantastic fiction can be a way of describing an imperfect world that can provoke social change. Women writing science fiction as part of the New Wave "recuperate[d] female archetypal roles that have fallen into stereotypes; … recover[ed] a lost matriarchal tradition in myth and history … deal[t] explicitly with woman-centered issues such as rape and gender inequality … and … reenvision[ed] traditional fantasy from a feminized perspective of caring and community". Don't Bite the Sun formed part of a projected trilogy (with Drinking Sapphire Wine and an unwritten third novel); such long novels and multibook series became increasingly common during the 1970s. Don’t Bite the Sun features considerable technology developed in the 1970s, including robots, game rooms and virtual reality, and compact computers.

Tanith Lee also credits feminist writers such as Elizabeth Bowen and Angela Carter as significant influences during her early career. While she did not consider herself a feminist author during the period in which she wrote Don't Bite the Sun, she later acknowledged her feminist influences The New Wave fascination with soul-crushing dystopian worlds is apparent in Don't Bite the Sun but is subverted into an apparent soul-crushing utopia.

Lee planned a third book, about the dome city of Four-BII which hadn't even been mentioned in the first two books

I had wished... to write a third book in which I would try to set out an alternative life-style, adventurous and stretching to mind and heart, but still, and importantly, free of the retributions of unprotected life. I did and do think a world would be feasible which gives pleasure and safety alongside excitement and development.

== Reception ==
Don’t Bite the Sun has received largely positive reviews on online sources such as Amazon, barnesandnoble.com, and Goodreads. The standalone book Don’t Bite The Sun has 4.2 of 5 on Goodreads with 228 ratings, with reviewers citing its light yet fantasy-rich storyline and referring to it as a "comfort book" that readers like to escape to, although some consider it challenging for a first-time reader. It has 4.5 of 5 stars on Amazon with 11 total reviews to date. The omnibus edition Biting the Sun, which includes the sequel, has 4.23 of five on Goodreads with 813 ratings, 4.8 of 5 stars on Amazon with 40 reviews (only five rate it less than 5 of 5), and 4.5 of 5 on BarnesandNoble with 15 ratings. Biting the Sun is the 22nd most popular item on alibris.com for work authored solely by Tanith Lee and her highest-ranked Amazon title. Review bloggers have described Don’t Bite the Sun as "a fun, addictive read" "written in a wonderful vernacular style."

=== Editions ===
There are three available editions of Don’t Bite the Sun. The book was originally published in February 1976 by science fiction, fantasy, and horror publisher DAW Books as a mass-market paperback with a front cover by English fantasy illustrator Brian Froud Don’t Bite the Sun was re-released by DAW on 7 August 1979, again as a mass-market paperback, this time under a new cover by Spanish artist Enrich Torres. In 1987, Starmont House Inc. published a hardcover offset of the 1976 DAW Books edition. The illustrator is unknown and not credited. All three editions differ only in cover illustrations and publishers.

In 1999, Bantam Books combined Don’t Bite the Sun and its sequel, Drinking Sapphire Wine (originally published by DAW Books in February 1977) in a single volume, Biting the Sun.

== Publishing history ==
Don’t Bite the Sun, as well as Biting the Sun, is one of the many books Tanith Lee has written that has been translated into different languages and published in other countries. In total, Don’t Bite the Sun and Biting the Sun has been translated into 8 different languages including English, French, German, Hebrew, Italian, Japanese, Portuguese, and Swedish.

=== Dutch ===
- De Dageraad De Jang-generatie (1976) Mass-market paperback. Cover illustration by Ruvanti.
- Meulenhoff Het Jang-fenomeen (1981) Mass-market paperback. Cover illustration by Paul Lehr.

=== English ===
- DAW Books, Inc. New York. Don’t Bite the Sun. (1976) Mass-market paperback. Cover Illustration by Brian Froud
- DAW Books, Inc. New York. Don’t Bite the Sun. (1979) Mass-market paperback. Cover Illustration by Enrich
- Hamlyn Paperbacks. Middlesex. Drinking Sapphire Wine. (1979) 'A' format paperback, omnibus of Don't Bite the Sun and Drinking Sapphire Wine. Cover Art by Peter Goodfellow
- Bantam Books. New York City, Sydney, Toronto, London, Auckland. Biting the Sun. (1999) Mass-market paperback. Cover Illustration by Kinuko Y. Craft

=== French ===
- Librairie des Champs-Élysées. Paris. Ne Mords Pas Le Soleil. (1979) Mass-market paperback. Translated by Maxime Barriere
- Presses-Pocket. Paris. Ne Mords Pas Le Soleil. (1991) Mass-market paperback. Translated by Maxime Barriere. Cover Illustration by Wojtek Siudmak

=== German ===
- Arthur Moewig Verlag. Germany. Beiss nicht in die Sonne. (1982) Mass-market paperback. Translated Irmhild Hubner. Cover Illustration by Don Maitz

=== Hebrew ===
- Elisar Publishing House. Israel. Al Tin 'ats Shinekha Ba-Shemesh. (1982) Trade paperback. Translated by Tamar Stern. Cover Illustration by Brian Froud
- Astrolog. Israel. Al Tin 'ats Shinekha Ba-Shemesh. (2001) Trade paperback. Translated by Tamar Stern. Cover Illustration by Brian Froud

=== Italian ===
- Libra Editrice. Bologna. Non mordere il sole. (1978) Dustwrapper over paper covered books. Translated by Roberta Rambelli

=== Japanese ===
- Sanpen Books. Tokyo. Baiteingu Za San. (2004) Paperback. Translated by Sanae Tamaki. Cover Illustration by Shou Shi Su Masayuki Design

=== Portuguese ===
- Distri Editora. Lisbon. Nao Mordam O Sol. (1985) Trade paperback. Translated by Maria Teresa Pinto Pereira. Cover Illustration by Catarina Rebello

=== Swedish ===
- Delta Forlags. Stockholm. Bit Inte Solen. (1977) Trade paperback. Translated by Gunnar Gallmo
- Delta Forlags. Stockholm. Bit Inte Solen. (1979) Laminated Paper Overboards. Translated by Gunnar Gallmo
