= Women as Demons: The Male Perception of Women through Space and Time =

Book by Tanith Lee

- First edition
- Author: Tanith Lee
- Cover artist: Juliette Pearce
- Language: English
- Genre: Fantasy, science fiction
- Publisher: The Women's Press
- Publication date: 1989
- Publication place: England
- Media type: Print (Trade Paperback)
- Pages: 274
- ISBN: 0-7043-4169-7
- OCLC: 18881555

Women as Demons: The Male Perception of Women through Space and Time is a 1989 book by British author Tanith Lee, compiling science fiction and fantasy short stories, all but two previously published at the time of release, and centered on female characters. It was published by The Women's Press.

== Contents ==
Women as Demons: The Male Perception of Women through Space and Time contains the following tales:

- "The Demoness"
- "Deux Amours D'une Sorcière"
- "The Unrequited Glove"
- "Gemini"
- "Into Gold"
- "The Lancastrian Blush"
- "You Are My Sunshine"
- "The One We Were"
- "The Truce"
- "The Squire's Tale"
- "Discovered Country"
- "Winter White"
- "Written in Water"
- "Mirage and Magia"
- "The Thaw"
- "Northern Chess"
