= The Thaw (novelette) =

Book by Tanith Lee

- Short story by Tanith Lee
- Genre: Science fiction

Publication
- Published in: Isaac Asimov's Science Fiction Magazine
- Publication type: Magazine
- Publication date: June 1979
- Publication place: United States
- Media type: Print (Paperback)

The Thaw (1978) is a novelette by British writer Tanith Lee. It was first published in Isaac Asimov's Science Fiction Magazine in June 1979 and has been reprinted in various anthologies.

== Plot synopsis ==
Carla Brice, a famous scientist, is diagnosed with a fatal and incurable disease. She is frozen in cryogenic suspension against a time in the future when her disease may be curable.

Some centuries later, in the year 2139, technology and medicine have advanced; she and several other frozen bodies are thawed out and their diseases cured. To help reorient Carla with her new life, she is placed with her great-great-great-great-great granddaughter Tacey Brice. Tacey is an unsuccessful illustrator and artist who makes a bare living and is glad to receive the support payments for hosting Carla. But she's intimidated by Carla's great beauty and intellect.

Visiting doctors and scientists detect gaps in Carla's memory, and Tacey also slowly realises that all is not well, when Carla starts eating the houseplants. She graduates to devouring a visiting doctor and Tacey now realises with horror that Carla is an insatiable flesh-eater.

The story is told by Tacey in flashback; she has had it explained to her by Carla that during suspension, Carla's body and the other frozen bodies were invaded by extraterrestrial intelligences. They have occupied the bodies and plan to use Earth's population as a source of food. But Carla has taken a liking to Tacey and keeps her alive in the manner of a household pet.
