= Glenn Harrington =

American painter

- Born: 1959 (age 66–67)
- Education: Pratt Institute, BFA 1981

Glenn Harrington is an American painter, born in New York in 1959.

In 1981, Harrington graduated from Pratt Institute in New York City. His early career included illustrating posters, magazines and over 600 book jackets. Harrington has created paintings for children's books on the works of William Shakespeare and W.B. Yeats as well as a limited edition book for Disney's Tarzan.

Harrington is noted for his enigmatic portraits, figurative paintings and landscapes, as well as for his paintings of the sport of golf. He was commissioned by the Jack Nicklaus Museum in Columbus, Ohio for thirty oils, highlighting the career of Jack Nicklaus. Harrington has also been commissioned for portraits of notable figures such as Wilbur Ross, and many of the inductees into the World Golf Hall of Fame. In 2006, Harrington completed three murals highlighting golfers Greg Norman and Pádraig Harrington that were installed at Doonbeg Golf Club, County Clare, Ireland.

Harrington currently works at studios in Bucks County, Pennsylvania and Coastal South Carolina. His paintings have been exhibited in galleries and museums throughout the United States as well as in Tokyo, London, and Barcelona.

== Selected exhibitions ==
- 2015 George Lucas' Star Wars: Visions Exhibition, Tokyo, Japan – Interpretive painting commissioned by George Lucas.
- 2014 Wells Gallery, Father and Son Show with Evan Harrington, Kiawah, SC.
- 2013 Galleria Silecchia, One-Man Exhibition, Sarasota, FL
- 2012 Eleanor Ettinger Gallery, "The Figure in American Art", New York, NY
- 2011 Eleanor Ettinger Gallery, Two-Man Show with Frank Arcuri, New York, NY
- 2010 Gratz Gallery, Solo Show, "Bucks County Figures and Landscapes", Doylestown, PA
- 2010 J. Willott Gallery, International Guild of Realism, Palm Desert, CA - Editor's Choice Award
- 2009 Sagecreek Gallery, Oil Painters of America 18th National Juried Exhibition, Santa Fe, NM- Jack Richeson Award of Excellence

== Selected awards ==
- 2005 Portrait Society of America, Honor Award, Annual Juried Exhibit, Washington, D.C.
- 2007 Portrait Society of America, Draper Grand Prize, Washington DC.
- 2007 Award of Excellence, Annual Juried Exhibit, Oil Painters of America, Fredericksburg, Texas.
- 2008 Award of Excellence, Annual Juried Exhibit, Oil Painters of America, Fredericksburg, Texas.
- 2008 Portrait Society of America, Honor Award, Washington, DC.
- 2009 Portrait Society of America, Certificate Award, Washington, D.C.
- 2011 John August Dietrich Memorial Figurative Award of Excellence, Oil Painters of America, Devin Galleries, Coeur d'Alene, Idaho
- 2013 Portrait Society of America, Finalist, Atlanta, GA.

== Publications and reviews ==
- 2013 Fine Art Connoisseur Magazine, "The Evocative Paintings of Glenn Harrington", Feature Article
- 2011 American Art Collector Magazine, "Setting the Stage", Feature Article
- 2006 American Art Collector Magazine, Exhibition Review
- 2005 American Artist Magazine, "A Timeless Brush", Cover Article
