= Death's Master =

1979 book by Tanith Lee

- Author: Tanith Lee
- Cover artist: David Schleinkofer
- Language: English
- Series: Tales from the Flat Earth
- Genre: Fantasy
- Publisher: DAW Books
- Publication date: 1979
- Publication place: United States
- Media type: Print (paperback)
- ISBN: 0879974419
- Preceded by: Night's Master
- Followed by: Delusion's Master

Death's Master is a fantasy novel by British writer Tanith Lee, the second book in her series Tales from the Flat Earth. It won the British Fantasy Award for best novel of 1979.

== Plot summary ==
Unlike Night's Master, which is told as separate stories, Death's Master is a continuous narrative.

The lesbian queen Narasen is forced by a curse to become pregnant in order to save her city. After fruitless sex with many men, she realizes that she cannot lift the curse until she has sex with a dead man. She makes a pact with Uhlume, Lord Death, and brings this about. Her child, Simmu, is beautiful and can change easily from male to female. Narasen is assassinated. Simmu, only a few days old, sees Death come for Narasen and forms a permanent hatred for death. Simmu is raised by the minor demons called Eshva, then by priests at a temple.

Zhirem, the son of a king and one of his wives, is made invulnerable by his mother. This arouses suspicion and hostility, and he is sent to the same temple as Simmu. The two become friends and briefly lovers (while Simmu is female). Simmu deflowers Zhirem by seduction while Zhirem wanted to remain a virgin for pious reasons. Zhirem becomes angry at Simmu for this corruption. Azhrarn, the Prince of Demons, rejects Zhirem's offer of service, increasing his bitterness, but takes Simmu as a lover because she hates Lord Death and makes her forget Zhirem. He starts Simmu on a quest to gain immortality to oppose Lord Death.

Narasen, in Death's kingdom, defies Uhlume and begins a power struggle with him.

Simmu and Azhrarn learn the location of a well on the flat earth directly under the well of the gods' water of immortality in "Upperearth". The earthly well is guarded by walls and by nine beautiful virgins whose intactness symbolizes the inviolability of the well. One of the virgins, Kassafeh (biological daughter of a god-like figure), is able to reject the illusions intended to make her time as a guardian paradisal due to her god-like heritage. Simmu goes through the wall and enters each virgin's bed as a woman but seduces each one as a man. He ends with Kassafeh, who becomes his ally. The virgins being deflowered, the upper well cracks, and Simmu and Kassafeh collect some of the water of immortality in a flask.

They each drink a drop. As they travel to the east to found a city of immortals, a rogue named Yolsippa unknowingly drinks a little water from their flask. They grudgingly accept him. With help from the demons, they build the beautiful city of Simmurad and bring the most brilliant people of the time to be immortal there. However, with no fear of death, the people of Simmurad stagnate.

Zhirem, shipwrecked, sinks to the bottom of the sea and becomes a captive of the sea people. By forming a relationship with their princess, he learns their magic and escapes to land. Now named Zhirek, he uses magic for selfishness and cruelty.

At the suggestion of Azhrarn, who is bored with Simmurad, Uhlume makes Zhirek his agent to destroy it. Zhirek enters the city, magically creates and kills an insect to introduce death there, and raises the sea to flood the city. Kassafeh and, by a fluke, Yolsippa escape and become Uhlume's representatives. Zhirek takes Simmu away and tries to consign him to everlasting torment. However, Simmu eventually becomes an Eshva. Zhirek, overwhelmed with guilt and hate, becomes an ascetic living on a pillar. Narasen takes on most of Uhlume's work of giving death to the dying.

== Reception ==
Death's Master won the British Fantasy Society's August Derleth Award for best novel.

David Langford said this book and Night's Master were "very atmospheric".

Alison Flood found the characters "unique and brilliant" but the story "too splintered, too multi-stranded".
