= Tanith Lee =

British science fiction and fantasy writer (1947 – 2015)

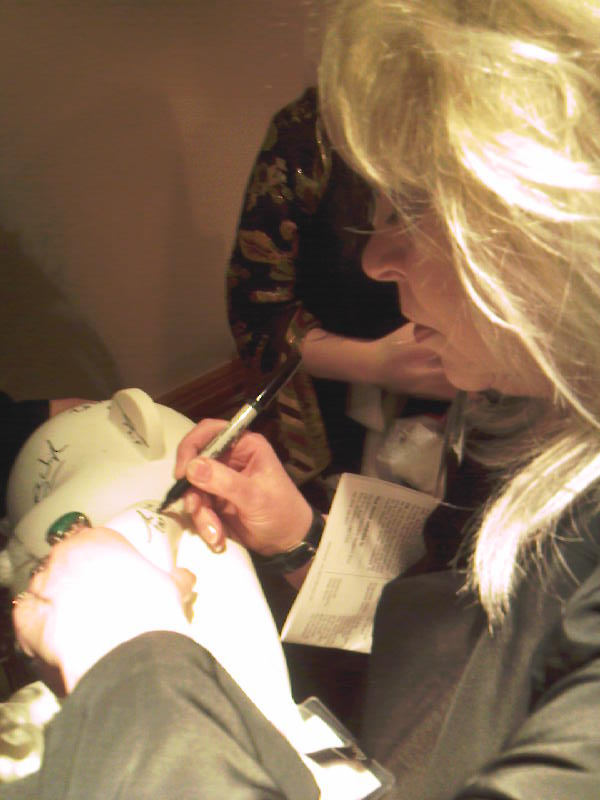
- Raising money for the Alzheimer's Research Trust during the 2011 campaign Match It For Pratchett (Terry Pratchett)
- Born: 19 September 1947; London, England
- Died: 24 May 2015 (aged 67); East Sussex, England
- Occupation: Writer
- Spouse: John Kaiine (m. 1992)
- Writing career
- Pen name: Esther Garber; Judas Garbah
- Genre: Speculative fiction
- Notable awards: 1980 British Fantasy Award, 1983 & 1984 World Fantasy Award

Tanith Lee (19 September 1947 – 24 May 2015) was a British science fiction and fantasy writer. She wrote more than 90 novels and 300 short stories, and was the winner of multiple World Fantasy Awards, the World Fantasy Lifetime Achievement Award and the Bram Stoker Award for Lifetime Achievement. She also wrote a children's picture book (Animal Castle), and many poems. She wrote two episodes of the BBC science fiction series Blake's 7 ("Sand" and "Sarcophagus").

She was the first woman to win the British Fantasy Award for Best Novel (also known as the August Derleth Award), for her book Death's Master (1980).

== Biography ==
=== Early life ===
Tanith Lee was born on 19 September 1947 in London, to professional dancers Bernard and Hylda Lee. Despite a persistent rumour, she was not the daughter of Bernard Lee (the actor who played "M" in the James Bond series films between 1962 and 1979). According to Lee, although her childhood was happy, she was the "traditional kid that got bullied," and had to move around frequently due to her parents' work. Although her family was poor, they maintained a large paperback collection, and Lee read weird fiction, including "Silken Swift" by Theodore Sturgeon and "Gabriel Ernest" by Saki, and discussed such literature as Hamlet and Dracula with her parents. Lee attended many different schools in childhood. She was at first "incapable" of reading due to a mild form of dyslexia, which was diagnosed later in life, but when she was aged 8, her father taught her to read in a few months, and she began to write at the age of 9.

=== Education ===
Because Lee's parents had to move for jobs, Lee attended numerous primary schools, then the Prendergast Grammar School for Girls. After secondary school, Lee attended Croydon Art College for a year. Realising that was not what she wanted to do, she dropped out of her course and held a number of jobs, including file clerk, waitress, shop assistant, and assistant librarian.

=== Writing career ===
She began publishing with The Betrothed (1968), a short story privately printed by a friend, but started serious writing with several children's fantasies. Of these, The Dragon Hoard (1971), her first novel, is a comic fantasy, in which an enchantress compels the quest-ridden protagonist to shapeshift into a raven at unpredictable moments. Princess Hynchatti & Some Other Surprises (collection of linked stories in 1972) puts its cast through various travails. In Companions on the Road (1975) the companions are the villains, a trio of hellish revenants who kill through their control of Dreams as they search for the holders of a magic chalice. The Winter Players (1976) – assembled with the previous book as Companions on the Road and The Winter Players: Two Novellas (1977) – dramatises the interaction between a young woman and the accursed wanderer whom she ultimately redeems. Even in these early works, several characteristic motifs dominate: the Rite of Passage whereby a young protagonist comes to terms – often via Metamorphosis – with his or her extraordinary nature, and strives for Balance in a riven world; vivid, but indeterminate, landscapes serving as almost interchangeable backdrops for psychic dramas; and a fine indifference to any moralistic settling of scores, her tales tending to close with Good and Evil characters settling into uneasy equipoise.

Her first professional sale came from "Eustace," a ninety-word vignette at the age of 21 in 1968. She continued to work in various jobs for almost another decade, due to rejection of her books. Her first novel (for children) was The Dragon Hoard, published in 1971 by Macmillan. Her career took off with the acceptance in 1975 by DAW Books USA of her adult fantasy epic The Birthgrave – a mass-market paperback. Many British publishers rejected The Birthgrave so she approached DAW Books. Lee subsequently maintained a prolific output in popular genre writing. The Birthgrave allowed Lee to be a full-time writer and stop doing "stupid and soul-killing jobs."

During the nineties her "career went through the doldrums" because of trends in publishing. Major publishing companies were less accepting of Lee's later works. The companies which Lee worked with for years refused to look at her proposals. Smaller companies were publishing just a few of Lee's works. The refusals did not stop her from writing and she had numerous unpublished novels and short stories. Letters from fans asked if she were dead because no new work had been published. Lee tried changing her genre, but to no success. However, Internet sales succeeded in reviving her writing.

==== Book sales ====
Lee had "quietly phenomenal sales" at certain periods throughout her career. When she tried changing genres, some of her works were liked by critics and published by small publishers, but it made no difference. The royalties were good before the publishers went bankrupt.

=== Personal life and death ===
In 1987, Lee met artist and writer John Kaiine. In 1992, the couple married. They lived in the south of England.

Lee died at her home in East Sussex of breast cancer on 24 May 2015.

== Works ==
Lee often used the transitional character of the bildungsroman, or coming-of-age stories. For instance, the protagonist of Lee's The Birthgrave undertakes a journey to understanding her identity and culture.

Lee's two longest werewolf stories, "Wolfland" and Lycanthia, followed Lee's custom of reversing the images of popular culture icons. Lee approximated the werewolves' behaviours according to the social and hunting patterns of wild wolves. In altering this trope, she endowed werewolf stories with a new and more positive mythos.

Lee's 1971 debut was the children's book The Dragon Hoard; her first adult book was The Birthgrave in 1975. Lee's prolific output spans a host of different genres, including adult fantasy, children's fantasy, science fiction, horror, Gothic horror, Gothic romance, and historical fiction. Her series of interconnected tales called The Flat-Earth Cycle, beginning with Night's Master and Death's Master, is similar in scope and breadth to Jack Vance's The Dying Earth.

Night's Master contains allegorical tales involving Azhrarn, a demonic prince who kidnaps and raises a beautiful boy and separates him from the sorrow of the real world. Eventually, the boy wants to know more about the earth, and asks to be returned, setting off a series of encounters between Azhrarn and mankind, some horrific and some positive. Later tales are loosely based on Babylonian mythology. In the science fiction Four-BEE series, Lee explores youth culture and identity in a society which grants eternally young teenagers complete freedom. They are even killed and receive new bodies, gender and/or identity over and over again. Lee has also written a historical novel with The Gods are Thirsty, set during the French Revolution.

During the late 1980s she published three collections - Dreams of Dark and Light (1986), Women as Demons (1989) and The Forests of the Night (1989).

A large part of Lee's output was children's fantasy, which spanned her career from The Dragon Hoard in 1971 to The Claidi Journals containing Wolf Tower, Wolf Star, Wolf Queen and Wolf Wing in the late 1990s and early 2000s.

Lee was published by various imprints, particularly depending on whether she was offering adult fiction or children's fantasy. Her earlier children's fantasy novels were published in hardcover by Macmillan UK and subsequently printed as paperbacks in the US often by DAW, with occasional hardcovers by St. Martin's Press. Some of her work was only printed in paperback, mainly in the US by DAW in the 1970s to the early 1980s. She received some small press treatment, such as the Arkham House edition of short stories Dreams of Dark and Light: The Great Short Fiction of Tanith Lee in 1986, and in the first "Night Visions" instalment published by Dark Harvest.

== Writing style ==
Lee's style is frequently remarked upon for its use of rich poetic prose and striking imagery. Critics describe her style as weird, lush, vibrant, exotic, erotic, rich, elegant, perverse, and darkly beautiful. The technique she used is very descriptive and poetic to match the themes she used in her mythical stories. She was praised for her ability to balance her weird style with the challenges of writing a faraway world, but some critics counter that her style is not always easy on the reader; she sometimes leaves the reader with unanswered questions.

== Themes ==
Lee's writing frequently featured nonconformist interpretations of fairy tales, vampire stories, myths, and the fantasy genre; as well as themes of feminism and sexuality. She also wrote lesbian fiction under the pseudonym Esther Garber. Other than feminism and sexuality, Lee used a wide range of other themes in her stories. From 1975 to 1980, she began writing Gothic science fiction; her first Gothic novel "Sabella or the Bloodstone" features themes of loneliness and fear. Lee's most celebrated story "Elle Est Trois", which examines the relationship between self-destruction and creativity "has themes of psychosis and sexuality, the subjugation of women, and the persuasive power of myth interwoven through it". Myth is again apparent (along with race) in her stories "The Storm Lord", "Anackire", and "The White Serpent". Three unique horror series were produced by Lee in the '90s; the first story, The Book of the Damned, features themes of body thievery and shape-shifting. Themes of homophobia, racism, and sexism are seen in Lee's sequence The Blood Opera, and The Venus Cycle features themes of love, loss, and revenge. Her collection Disturbed by Her Song features themes of eroticism, despair, isolation, and the pressure of an unforgiving and unwelcoming society. These themes reoccur in her 1976 novel Don't Bite the Sun where the characters are involved in a very erotic lifestyle and the protagonist experiences despair. Eroticism shows up again in her novel "Death's Master" which examines the childhood origins of eroticism and the "later conflicts that arise from it". The sequel to Don't Bite the Sun, Drinking Sapphire Wine, is thematically similar to her other works, in that it features themes of death and renewal, sexuality, and love. The theme of recognition also appears in Drinking Sapphire Wine, where the characters are forced to recognize others and themselves in a world where physical form is so readily alterable.

== Influences ==
Lee was influenced by multiple genres, as well as various media formats including music and film. Her Flat Earth series was inspired by a game she played with her mother; some of her other works are influenced by fairy tales her mother told her. Much of her work comes from "small things" rather than major inspirations.

=== Authors ===
Lee was inspired by writers and playwrights, including Graham Greene, Rebecca West, Elizabeth Bowen, Jack Vance, Fritz Leiber, Theodore Sturgeon, Angela Carter, Jane Gaskell, Charles Dickens, William Shakespeare, William Blake, Anton Chekhov, Harold Pinter, Tennessee Williams, Arthur Miller, Henrik Ibsen, August Strindberg, Ivan Turgenev, Ivan Bunin, Henry James, Rosemary Sutcliff, Mary Renault, Jean Rhys, John Fowles, John le Carré, the Brontë family, E. M. Forster, W. Somerset Maugham, Isabel Allende, Margaret Atwood, Ruth Rendell, Lawrence Durrell, Elroy Flecker, and Ted Hughes. Lee considered Virginia Woolf and C. S. Lewis to be influential on her from a young age.

=== Other genres ===
Lee was influenced by painters, movies, television, and music. She cites Sergei Prokofiev, Sergei Rachmaninoff, Dmitri Shostakovich (whose symphonies influenced certain scenes in Anackire), George Frideric Handel, Annie Lennox and Johnny Cash as musical influences. Film influences include Ben-Hur, Caesar and Cleopatra (with Vivien Leigh and Claude Rains), Coppola's Dracula, Brotherhood of the Wolf (subtitled version), Olivier's Hamlet. The various Quatermass TV series and films inspired Lee, along with the films Forbidden Planet (1956), Ingmar Bergman's The Seventh Seal (1957) and Plunkett & Macleane (1999). The TV version of Georg Büchner's play Danton's Death (1978), inspired her to write her French historical novel. The painters that have inspired her include Vincent van Gogh, Cotman, J. M. W. Turner, Gustav Klimt, Rousseau, Leonardo da Vinci, Sandro Botticelli, Lawrence Alma-Tadema, and several Pre-Raphaelites.

== Reception ==
In Issue 30 of Abyss (Summer 1984), Dave Nalle called her "an outstandingly fine writer, but her writing is not for everyone. Her work is very philosophically and atmospherically oriented, and examines themes which may not appeal to many readers, usually having to do with interpersonal relationships, commitment and the fringe areas of madness and self-delusion." Nalle also noted "Her style is brilliant and getting better all the time, but she has a dark and depressing vision at times and doesn't pack each story with action and adventure." Nalle warned that "the content of many stories is mature in nature, both in concept and in specific content, often dealing with erotic and sexually variant topics which I've found deters some readers." Nalle concluded, "Lee's work is not for every reader, but she creates excellent and imaginative examples of 'Dark Fantasy', mixing elements of horror, fantasy and mythology with remarkable success.""

== Awards ==
Nebula Awards

- 1975: The Birthgrave (nominated, best novel)
- 1980: Red as Blood (nominated, best short story)

World Fantasy Awards

- 1979: Night's Master (nominated, best novel)
- 1983: The Gorgon (winner, best short story)
- 1984: Elle Est Trois, (La Mort) (winner, best short story)
- 1984: Nunc Dimittis (nominated, best novella)
- 1984: Red as Blood (nominated, best anthology/collection)
- 1985: Night Visions 1 (nominated, best anthology/collection)
- 1987: Dreams of Dark and Light (nominated, best anthology/collection)
- 1988: Night's Sorceries (nominated, best anthology/collection)
- 1999: Scarlet and Gold (nominated, best novella)
- 2006: Uous (nominated, best novella)
- 2013: Life Achievement Award

World Horror Convention

- 2009: Grand Master Award

British Fantasy Awards

- 1979: Quest for the White Witch (nominated, best novel)
- 1980: Death's Master (winner, best novel)
- 1980: Red as Blood (nominated, best short story)
- 1981: Kill the Dead (nominated, best novel)
- 1999: Jedella Ghost (nominated, best short story)
- 2000: Where Does the Town Go at Night? (nominated, best short story)

Lambda Awards

- 2010: Disturbed by Her Song (nominated, best LGBT speculative fiction)

Infinity Award

- 2024: Posthumous lifetime achievement award
