= Donald M. Grant, Publisher =

American fantasy and science fiction publisher

- Predecessor: Grandon, Publishers
- Founded: 1964
- Founder: Donald M. Grant
- Country of origin: United States
- Headquarters location: Hampton Falls, New Hampshire
- Publication types: Books
- Fiction genres: Fantasy
- Official website: grantbooks.com

Donald M. Grant, Publisher, Inc. is a fantasy and science fiction small press publisher in New Hampshire that was founded in 1964. It is notable for publishing fantasy and horror novels with lavish illustrations, most notably Stephen King's The Dark Tower series and the King/Peter Straub novel The Talisman.

== History ==
Donald M. Grant first entered the small field back in 1945; he served as the revitalising spark for the specialty presses. He was one of the founders of Grant-Hadley Enterprises and was associated with the two other publishing imprints, The Buffalo Book Company and The Hadley Publishing Co., that grew out of the original company. After Hadley folded in 1948, Grant decided to start a new imprint with a new partner, James J. Donahue. Grant and Donahue named their new imprint The Grandon Company. Their first book was The Port of Peril by Otis Adelbert Kline. Grandon put out four other books over the next nine years before ceasing operations.

Six years later, in 1964, Grant re-entered publishing. This time he used his own name for the imprint, as Donald M. Grant, Publisher, Inc. The first book published under the new imprint was a huge, attractively done bibliography, A Golden Anniversary Bibliography of Edgar Rice Burroughs, by Rev. Henry Hardy Heins. It was a success and sold out of its printing of 2,000 within two months of publication, providing needed capital. Grant had developed a relationship with Glenn Lord, the executor of the Robert E. Howard estate. Lord suggested reprinting a new edition of Howard's incredibly rare first book, A Gent from Bear Creek, a collection of westerns. Done in an edition of only 400 copies, the book sold with appalling slowness. However, Grant went on to cautiously publish several additional works by Howard.

In 1968, his edition of Red Shadows by Howard featuring color plates by Jeff Jones sold out so quickly that Grant was forced to print a second edition. It was a turning point. Howard was beginning to sell in hardcover as the Conan books became bestsellers in paperback and comic book form. More importantly, Grant saw that there was a market for attractively done books, even at higher prices. Fans had become disenchanted with cheaply produced and poorly packaged hardcovers as issued by the major publishers. After years of books without illustrations, done on the cheapest pulp paper available, science fiction collectors were looking for something better. Grant recognised this desire and offered books with interior illustrations, some even featuring tipped-in color plates, as well as good bindings and fine paper. It was the start of a trend.

Grant was approached by Stephen King, in 1981, with an offer to publish a collection of King's Gunslinger stories that had appeared in the magazine Fantasy and Science Fiction. King thought the stories would not appeal to his mainstream readers. Grant and King signed an agreement giving Grant exclusive hardcover rights to all the stories, including future ones.

== Works published by The Grandon Company ==
- The Port of Peril by Otis Adelbert Kline (1949)
- Dwellers in the Mirage by A. Merritt (1950)
- 333: A Bibliography of the Science-Fantasy Novel, by Joseph H. Crawford, Jr., James J. Donahue and Donald M. Grant (1953)
- The Return of Tharn by Howard Browne (1957)
- The Werewolf of Ponkert by H. Warner Munn (1958)

== Works published by Donald M. Grant, Publisher, Inc. ==
- A Golden Anniversary Bibliography of Edgar Rice Burroughs, by Rev. Henry Hardy Heins (1964)
- A Gent from Bear Creek, by Robert E. Howard (1966)
- The Pride of Bear Creek, by Robert E. Howard (1966)
- The Goddess of Ganymede, by Michael Resnick (1967)
- Red Shadows, by Robert E. Howard (1968)
- Singers in the Shadows, by Robert E. Howard (1970)
- Red Blades of Black Cathay, by Robert E. Howard and Tevis Clyde Smith (1971)
- Virgil Finlay, compiled and edited by Donald M. Grant (1971)
- Marchers of Valhalla, by Robert E. Howard (1972)
- Echoes from an Iron Harp, by Robert E. Howard (1972)
- The Sowers of the Thunder, by Robert E. Howard (1973)
- The Temple of the Ten, by H. Bedford-Jones and W. C. Robertson (1973)
- Tigers of the Sea, by Robert E. Howard (1973)
- The People of the Black Circle, by Robert E. Howard (1973)
- Worms of the Earth, by Robert E. Howard (1974)
- Almuric, by Robert E. Howard (1975)
- A Witch Shall be Born, by Robert E. Howard (1975)
- The Tower of the Elephant, by Robert E. Howard (1975)
- Virgil Finlay: An Astrology Sketchbook, by Virgil Finlay (1975)
- Out of the Storm, by William Hope Hodgson (1975)
- The Bowl of Baal, by Robert Ames Bennet (1975)
- Red Nails, by Robert E. Howard (1975)
- The Banner of Joan, by H. Warner Munn (1975)
- To Quebec and the Stars, by H. P. Lovecraft (1976)
- The Iron Man & Other Tales of the Ring, by Robert E. Howard (1976)
- Rogues in the House, by Robert E. Howard (1976)
- The Last Celt: A Bio–Bibliography of Robert Ervin Howard, by Glenn Lord (1976)
- Black Vulmea's Vengeance, by Robert E. Howard (1976)
- Upon the Winds of Yesterday and Other Explorations by George Barr (1976)
- The Devil in Iron, by Robert E. Howard (1976)
- The Chronicles of Lucius Leffing, by Joseph Payne Brennan (1977)
- The Dream of X, by William Hope Hodgson (1977)
- Marchers of Valhalla, by Robert E. Howard (1977)
- Black God's Shadow, by C. L. Moore (1977)
- The Three Palladins, by Harold Lamb (1977)
- King—of the Khyber Rifles, by Talbot Mundy (1978)
- Emperor of Dreams: A Clark Ashton Smith Bibliography, by Donald Sidney-Fryer (1978)
- The Magic Pen of Joseph Clement Coll, by Walt Reed (1978)
- Alicia Austin's Age of Dreams, by Alicia Austin (1978)
- Queen of the Black Coast, by Robert E. Howard (1978)
- Bazaar of the Bizarre, by Fritz Leiber (1978)
- The Revenge of Dracula, by Peter Tremayne (1978)
- Act of Providence, by Joseph Payne Brennan and Donald M. Grant (1979)
- The Road of Azrael, by Robert E. Howard (1979)
- Black Colossus, by Robert E. Howard (1979)
- The Black Wolf, by Galad Elflandsson (1979)
- Tales of the Werewolf Clan: Volume One, by H. Warner Munn (1979)
- Jewels of Gwahlur, by Robert E. Howard (1979)
- Lovecraft's Providence and Adjacent Parts, by Henry L. P. Beckwith, Jr. (1979)
- Mayhem on Bear Creek, by Robert E. Howard (1979)
- Hawks of Outremer, by Robert E. Howard (1979)
- Fields of Sleep, by E. C. Vivian (1980)
- Science Fiction in Old San Francisco: Volume One, History of the Movement From 1854 to 1890, by Sam Moskowitz (1980)
- Science Fiction in Old San Francisco: Volume Two, Into the Sun & Other Stories, by Robert Duncan Milne (1980)
- A Vision of Doom: Poems by Ambrose Bierce, by Ambrose Bierce (1980)
- Tales of the Werewolf Clan: Volume Two, by H. Warner Munn (1980)
- Ealdwood, by C. J. Cherryh (1981)
- Lord of the Dead, by Robert E. Howard (1981)
- Durandal, by Harold Lamb (1981)
- Creep to Death, by Joseph Payne Brennan (1981)
- Scarlet Dream, by C. L. Moore (1981)
- Heroes and Hobgoblins, by L. Sprague de Camp (1981)
- The Wonderful Lips of Thibong Linh, by Theodore Roscoe (1981)
- The Dark Tower: The Gunslinger, by Stephen King (1982)
- As it is Written, by "Clark Ashton Smith" (1982)
- Evil Always Ends, by Joseph Payne Brennan (1982)
- The Soft Whisper of the Dead, by Charles L. Grant (1982)
- The General's Wife, by Peter Straub (1982)
- Talbot Mundy: Messenger of Destiny, compiled by Donald M. Grant (1983)
- The Sea of the Ravens, by Harold Lamb (1983)
- Yellow Men Sleep, by Jeremy Lane (1983)
- Christine, by Stephen King (1983)
- The Hundred-Year Christmas, by David Morrell (1983)
- The Last Adventurer: The Life of Talbot Mundy by Peter Berresford Ellis (1984)
- Daughter of Regals, by Stephen R. Donaldson (1984)
- The Adventures of Samurai Cat, by Mark Rogers (1984)
- The Talisman, by Stephen King and Peter Straub (1984)
- The Far Islands and Other Tales of Fantasy, by John Buchan (1984)
- Kull, by Robert E. Howard (1985)
- The Book of Kane, by Karl Edward Wagner (1985)
- A Monster at Christmas, by Thomas Canty (1985)
- The Dark Cry of the Moon, by Charles L. Grant (1985)
- The Undying Land, by William Gilmour (1985)
- The Borders Just Beyond, by Joseph Payne Brennan (1986)
- One Who Walked Alone: Robert E. Howard, The Final Years, by Novalyne Price Ellis (1986)
- The Pool of the Black One, by Robert E. Howard (1986)
- Winter Reckoning, by Noel-Anne Brennan (1986)
- Lovecraft's Providence and Adjacent Parts: Second Edition Revised and Enlarged, by Henry L. P. Beckwith, Jr. (1986)
- The Curious Quests of Brigadier Ffellowes, by Sterling E. Lanier (1986)
- The Long Night of the Grave, by Charles L. Grant (1986)
- Yellow Fog, by Les Daniels (1986)
- My Lady of Hy-Brasil and Other Stories, by Peter Tremayne (1987)
- The Dark Tower II: The Drawing of the Three, by Stephen King (1987)
- Madame Two Swords, by Tanith Lee (1988)
- Prime Evil, edited by Douglas E. Winter (1988)
- The Hour of the Dragon, by Robert E. Howard (1989)
- Shadows of Dreams, by Robert E. Howard (1989)
- The Magician Out of Manchuria, by Charles G. Finney (1989)
- Post Oaks & Sand Roughs, by Robert E. Howard (1990)
- The Adventures of Lucius Leffing, by Joseph Payne Brennan (1990)
- At the Mountains of Madness, by H. P. Lovecraft (1990)
- Mrs. God, by Peter Straub (1991)
- The Face in the Abyss, by A. Merritt (1991)
- The Aeneid of Virgil, translated by Edward McCrorie (1991)
- The Dark Tower III: The Waste Lands, by Stephen King (1991)
- The Dark Tower Portfolio, by Ned Dameron (1991)
- The Haunted Pampero, by William Hope Hodgson (1992)
- Dragons Teeth: The Art of Patricia Lucas-Morris, by Patricia Lucas-Morris with Poems by Ross Whitney (1992)
- Here There Be Dragons, by Roger Zelazny (1992)
- Way Up High, by Roger Zelazny (1992)
- Metahorror, edited by Dennis Etchison (1992)
- Double Memory: Art & Collaborations, by Rick Berry & Phil Hale (1993)
- Gummitch and Friends, by Fritz Leiber (1993)
- Fur Magic, by Andre Norton (1993)
- The Totem, by David Morrell (1994)
- Stonecutter by Jon J. Muth and John Kuramoto (1994)
- It's Garbage Coming!, by Jeff Jones (1994)
- Terror of the Sea, by William Hope Hodgson (1996)
- Time and Chance, by L. Sprague de Camp (1996)
- Desperation, by Stephen King (1996)
- Wastelands Portfolio, by Ned Dameron (1997)
- The Dark Tower IV: Wizard and Glass, by Stephen King (1997)
- Dark Tower Boxed Set, by Stephen King (1998)
- Marcia on the Doorstep, by Edgar Rice Burroughs (1999)
- You Lucky Girl!, by Edgar Rice Burroughs (1999)
- The Crow: Shattered Lives and Broken Dreams, edited by J. O’Barr and Ed Kramer (2001)
- Goad: The Many Moods of Phil Hale, by Phil Hale (2002)
- A Golden Anniversary Bibliography of Edgar Rice Burroughs, by Rev. Henry Hardy Heins (2002)
- Black House, by Stephen King and Peter Straub (2002)
- The Dark Tower V: Wolves of the Calla, by Stephen King (2003)
- The Dark Tower VI: Song of Susannah, by Stephen King (2004)
- The Dark Tower VII: The Dark Tower, by Stephen King (2004)
- The Talisman/Black House, by Stephen King and Peter Straub (2005)
- Mockingbirds/Relaxeder, by Phil Hale (2005)
- The Paperback Art of James Avati, by James Avati, Piet Schreuders & Kenneth Fulton (2006)
- The Dark Tower: The Wind Through the Keyhole, by Stephen King (2012)
- Idyl/I'm Age, by Jeffrey Jones (2015)
- Goblin Market, by Christina Rossetti (2016)
