= Breckinridge Elkins =

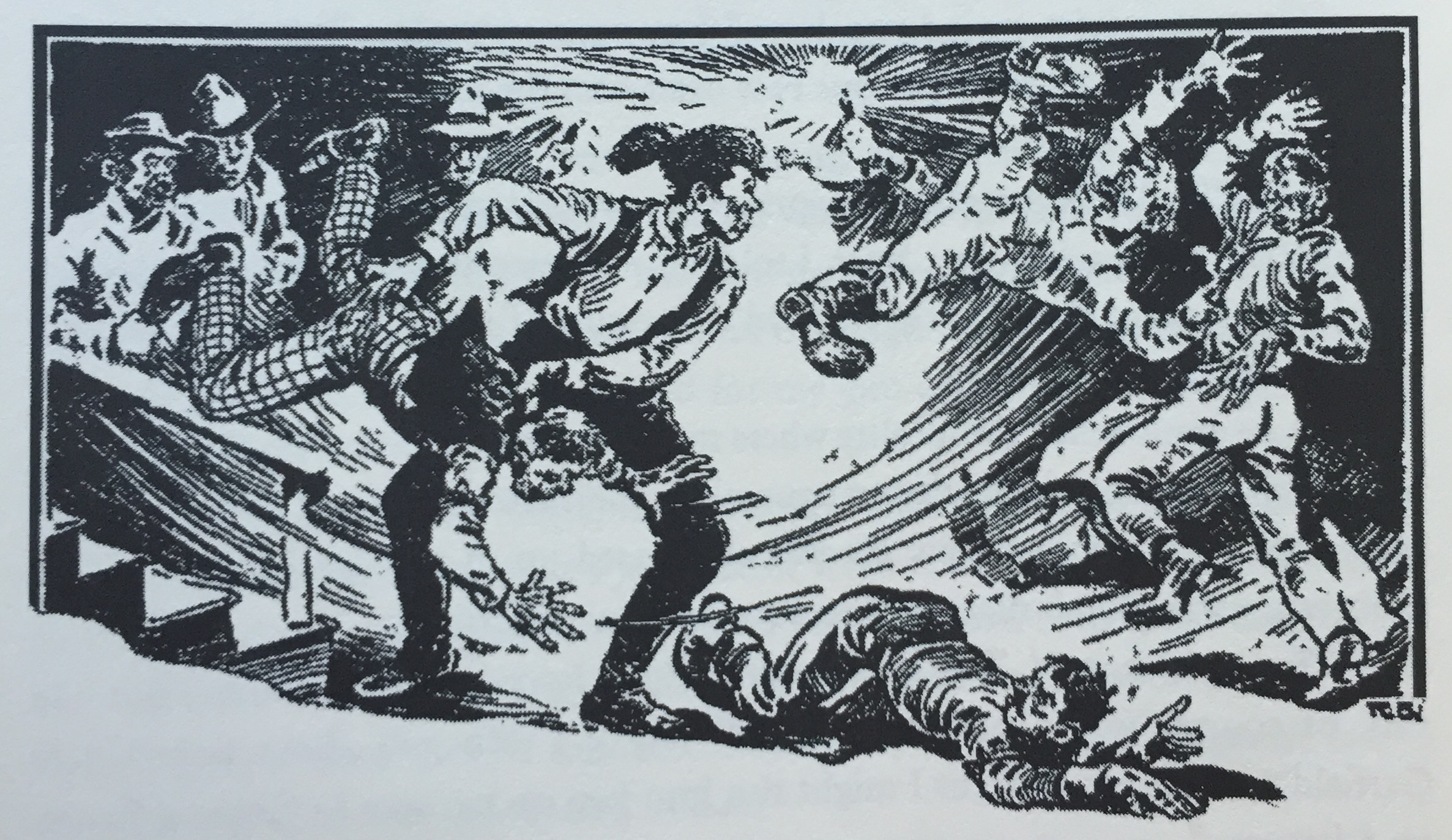
- Illustration by Rudolph Belarski for "The Scalp Hunters," Action Stories, August 1934.
- First appearance: Action Stories, March–April 1934
- Created by: Robert E. Howard

In-universe information
- Gender: Male
- Nationality: American

Breckinridge Elkins is a fictional character created by pulp writer Robert E. Howard. He was featured in twenty-six humorous Western short stories, most of which originally appeared in the pages of Action Stories between 1934 and 1937, as well as the novel A Gent from Bear Creek.

== Character description ==
"Breck" Elkins is a hillbilly from Bear Creek, a fictional location in the Humboldt Mountains of Nevada. He is "mighty of stature and small of brain"—a physically huge and imposing figure, and his reputation as a short-tempered and ferocious fighter often precedes him throughout the Southwest. He is usually found in the company of Cap'n Kidd, his equally fierce and cantankerous horse. He sometimes wears a coonskin cap and is depicted wearing one in several illustrations that accompanied the stories in the original pulp magazine. Elkins is a man of limited intelligence and education, illiterate in some of the stories, while able to read in others.

Although Howard referred to the Elkins stories as "Westerns," they all have exaggerated elements and humor that make them closer in tone to Texas "Tall Lying" stories (such as the well-known tall tales of Pecos Bill) than to traditional Western action stories. Breckinridge is a larger-than-life figure whose abilities to dish out and absorb punishment go well beyond the limits of credulity. He is the first-person narrator (in hillbilly dialect) of all of his stories, and much of the humor is derived from his limited understanding of situations, leading to confusion and complications. His ill-fated attempts to help friends and relatives usually come to grief for himself and often those he was ostensibly aiding. His repeated romantic failures in wooing the eligible women he encounters are another recurring theme in the stories.

== History and reception ==
Howard wrote twenty-six Breckinridge Elkins stories in all, starting with "Mountain Man," which was completed by July 1933. While he is better remembered for creating characters such as Conan and Solomon Kane, the Breckinridge Elkins stories were in fact the longest-running and most commercially successful series of Howard's writing career, running in every issue of Action Stories from "Mountain Man" in March–April 1934 through "The Conquerin' Hero of the Humbolts" in October 1936 after his death. Despite being overlooked by comparison with his contributions to the swords-and-sorcery genre, some critics have thought that in the Breckinridge Elkins stories "Finally, Robert's real storytelling voice, unfiltered through books and imagined histories, could be heard, and in the medium in which he was most familiar."

Based upon the success of the Breckinridge Elkins tales, during the summer of 1935 Howard edited together several of the previously published short stories along with some new material to form the chapters of an episodic novel, A Gent from Bear Creek. The common (and newly added) thread that held the chapters together was Breck's rocky romance with a young woman named Glory McGraw. Her ultimate consent to marry him marks one of the few unequivocally happy endings in Howard's writings. Although he had come close several times before, Howard had yet to have a full-length book published. Howard's agent, Robert Kline, was once again unsuccessful in finding an American publisher for A Gent from Bear Creek. It was eventually published in the United Kingdom by Herbert Jenkins in 1937, the year after Howard committed suicide, and copies of that rare first edition have sold for upwards of $8000.

== In other media ==
Breckinridge Elkins is the subject of a webcomic adaptation by Gary Chaloner.

== See also ==
- List of Breckinridge Elkins stories
- A Gent from Bear Creek
- Mayhem on Bear Creek
- The Pride of Bear Creek
- Gary Chaloner
