= Glenn Lord =

- Born: November 17, 1931; Pelican, Louisiana, United States
- Died: December 31, 2011 (aged 80); Texas, United States
- Occupations: agent, editor

Glenn Lord (November 17, 1931 – December 31, 2011) was an American literary agent, editor, and publisher of the prose and poetry of fellow Texan Robert E. Howard (1906–1936), and the first and most important researcher and scholar of Howard's life and writings.

== Background and discovery ==
Lord was born November 17, 1931, in Pelican, De Soto Parish, Louisiana. A Korean War veteran and a paper warehouse manager by trade, he discovered Howard through Skull-Face and Others (1946) around 1951. He sought out earlier publications with Howard's work, most notably the pulp magazines of the 1920s and 1930s. Starting in 1956, he scoured the country for all Howard stories, poems, and letters. Over the course of his life he amassed the world's largest collection of such publications and original manuscripts (actually typescripts).

== Literary agent ==
Lord became literary agent for the Howard heirs around March 1965 and served as such for 28 and a half years. In 1965, he tracked down the contents of Robert E. Howard's famous storage trunk, which were then owned by pulp writer and Howard friend E. Hoffmann "Ed" Price. The contents consisted of tens of thousands of pages typed by Howard, including hundreds of unpublished stories, poems, and fragments. Using the contents of the trunk as well as his vast collection of previously published REH materials, Lord provided the source text for almost every published Howard work appearing in books, magazines, or chapbooks from 1965 through 1997, including collections of Howard letters Lord also provided introductions, afterwords, or commentary for dozens of Howard books.

Tirelessly promoting Howard's stories, Lord secured their publication in any promising venue, leading directly to the Howard Boom of the 1970s. This included books by Ace, Arkham House, Avon, Baen, Ballantine, Bantam, Barnes & Noble Books, Baronet, Berkley, Beagle, Belmont, Bonanza, Carroll & Graff, Centaur, Century-Hutchinson, Chelsea House, Chaosium, DAW, Dell, Delta, Dodd-Mead, Dorset, Doubleday, Fawcett Gold Medal, FAX, Fedogan & Bremer, Fictioneer, Five Star, Gollancz, Grafton, Gramercy, Donald M. Grant, Grosset & Dunlap, Harper Collins, Jove, Kaye & Ward, Lancer, Leisure, MacFadden, Manor, Mayflower, Meys, Morning Star Press, New English Library, Neville Spearman, Orbit, Oxford University Press, Pan, Panther, Prentice-Hall, Putnam, Pyramid, REH Foundation Press, Robinson, Ryerson, Science Fiction Book Club, Sidgwick & Jackson, Signet, Sphere, Taplinger, TOR, Tower, Underwood-Miller, University of Nebraska Press, Walker & Co., Warner Books, WH Allen, Xanadu and Zebra; periodicals such as Amazing Science Fiction Stories, Amazing Stories, Ariel, Chacal, Coven 13/Witchcraft & Sorcery, Different Worlds, Fantastic Science Fiction and Fantasy Stories/Fantastic Stories of Imagination, Fantasy Book, Fantasy Commentator, Fantasy Crossroads, Fantasy Crosswinds, Fantasy Tales, The Haunt of Horror, Heavy Metal, Lost Fantasies, Magazine of Horror, Pulp Review, The Riverside Quarterly, Rod Serling's The Twilight Zone Magazine, Spaceway Science Fiction, Startling Mystery Stories, Sword and Sorcery, Trumpet, Weird Tales, Weirdbook, The West, White Wolf Magazine, Worlds of Fantasy, Xenophile, and Zane Grey Western Magazine; and several series of Marvel comic books and magazines. In many cases, he was also the uncredited editor of the published version of the Howard works. He also supplied texts to amateur publications and to literally hundreds of books and magazines in non-English languages, including Bulgarian, Croatian, Czech, Dutch, Estonian, Finnish, French, German, Greek, Hungarian, Italian, Japanese, Lithuanian, Norwegian, Polish, Portuguese, Romanian, Russian, Spanish, Swedish, Turkish, and Yugoslavian.

In the fall of 1977, he arranged with Berkley Medallion to put out three Conan paper- and hardbacks of Conan stories edited by Karl Edward Wagner, the first Conan series without any posthumous revisions and pastiches, which previous collections had in excess.

Lord published a few REH collections on his own, such as the periodical The Howard Collector #1–18 and the chapbook Etchings in Ivory. In The Howard Collector, from 1961 to 1973, Lord featured previously unpublished (or very rare) pieces by Howard, letters by REH and those who knew him, indices of poems and stories, reprints of articles related to Howard, and news about upcoming publications and other events. Thereafter, he published similar material in fanzines of the Robert E. Howard United Press Association, the Hyperborian League, and the Esoteric Order of Dagon (an amateur press association primarily concerned with the writings of H. P. Lovecraft).

An early admirer of Howard's poetry, Lord published the first Howard poetry collection Always Comes Evening (1957) through famed Arkham House, subsidizing the costs of the printing himself. Later, he was instrumental in the publication of the Howard verse collections Etchings in Ivory (1968), Singers in the Shadows (1970), Echoes from an Iron Harp (1972), The Road to Rome (1972), Verses in Ebony (1975), Night Images (1976), Shadows of Dreams (1989), and A Rhyme of Salem Town and Other Poems (2007).

He published the first comprehensive bibliography of Howard, complete through 1973, in his The Last Celt: A Bio–Bibliography of Robert Ervin Howard (1976), a bible for REH scholars and collectors. The book also contains biographical and autobiographical material about Howard, as well as letters, story synopses and fragments, ephemera, covers illustrating REH stories, and photographs. Lord wrote many articles on Howard (e.g. in The Dark Barbarian). Lord contributed much information to the latest bibliography, The Neverending Hunt (2006, 2008), by Paul Herman and the online bibliography Howardworks.

When Conan Properties was incorporated in 1978 to establish a single entity to deal with Hollywood in negotiations that led to the two Conan movies, Lord served as a corporate director.

== Legacy, honors and personal life ==
Lord befriended, assisted, advised, and mentored two generations of Howard fans, scholars, and editors, providing copies of his typescripts, letters, and vast knowledge to many of them. For his dedication, achievements, and scholarship, Lord received the World Fantasy Convention Award in 1978 and the Lifetime Achievement Award of the fan magazine The Cimmerian, in 2005. The next year, he was Guest of Honor at the Centennial Robert E. Howard Days festival in Howard's hometown of Cross Plains, Texas, and in 2007 was Guest of Honor at PulpCon 36 in Dayton, Ohio. He served as Director Emeritus of the Robert E. Howard Foundation and lived with his wife in Pasadena, Texas, where he died on December 31, 2011. They had a son and a daughter.
