= Black Wolf (disambiguation) =

The Black wolf is a melanistic color variant of the grey wolf (Canis lupus).

Black Wolf may also refer to:

== Places ==
United States

- Black Wolf, Kansas, an unincorporated community
- Black Wolf, West Virginia
- Black Wolf (community), Wisconsin, an unincorporated community
- Black Wolf Point, Wisconsin, an unincorporated community
- Black Wolf Township, Ellsworth County, Kansas
- Black Wolf, Wisconsin, a town

== Other ==
- Florida black wolf, an extinct subspecies of the red wolf Canis rufus
- Black Wolf (novel), a fantasy novel by Dave Gross
- The Black Wolf (film), a 1917 silent film drama
- The Black Wolf (novel), a 1979 horror novel by Galad Elflandsson
