= Fields of Sleep =

1923 book by E. C. Vivian

- First edition cover
- Author: E. C. Vivian
- Language: English
- Genre: Fantasy
- Publisher: Hutchinson
- Publication date: 1923
- Publication place: United Kingdom
- Media type: Print (Hardback)
- Pages: 288
- Followed by: People of the Darkness

Fields of Sleep is a fantasy novel by British writer E. C. Vivian. It was first published in the United Kingdom in 1923 by Hutchinson. In the United States, the novel first appeared in the magazine Famous Fantastic Mysteries under the title The Valley of Silent Men. An edition with illustrations by Thomas Canty was published by Donald M. Grant, Publisher, Inc. in 1980. A sequel, People of the Darkness, appeared in 1924. An omnibus edition of the two volumes was published by Arno Press as Aia in 1978.

== Plot introduction ==
The novel concerns English adventurer Victor Marshall who is hired to find a fellow Englishman who is lost in Asiatic Sapelung. Marshall discovers a hidden valley and is imprisoned by its inhabitants who are descended from ancient Chaldean colonists. The inhabitants are dependent on a narcotic flower whose fragrance produces ecstasy. Marshall finds his countryman living among the inhabitants. After a flood, the flowers are destroyed and without it, the inhabitants including Marshall's countryman perish. Not dependent on the flower, Marshall survives.

== Sources ==
- Chalker, Jack L.; Mark Owings (1998). The Science-Fantasy Publishers: A Bibliographic History, 1923-1998. Westminster, MD and Baltimore: Mirage Press, Ltd. p. 326.
- Clute, John; John Grant (1997). The Encyclopedia of Fantasy. New York: St. Martin's Press. p. 988. ISBN 0-88184-708-9.
- Crawford, Jr., Joseph H.; James J. Donahue; Donald M. Grant (1953). "333", A Bibliography of the Science-Fantasy Novel. Providence, RI: The Grandon Company. p. 66. OCLC 3924496.
- Tuck, Donald H. (1978). The Encyclopedia of Science Fiction and Fantasy. Chicago: Advent. p. 439. ISBN 0-911682-22-8.
