= Jeremy Lane (disambiguation) =

Jeremy Lane (born 1990) is an American football cornerback.

Jeremy Lane may also refer to:

- Jeremy Lane (writer) (1893–1963), writer of mystery and lost world short stories and novels

== See also ==
- Jerry Lane (disambiguation)
- Jeremy Laing, Canadian fashion designer
