= Here be dragons (disambiguation) =

Here be dragons is a phrase used on geographical maps to indicate dangerous or unexplored areas.

Here be dragons, Here there be dragons, or There be dragons may also refer to:

== Literature ==
- Here Be Dragons, a 1985 historical novel by Sharon Kay Penman
- Here Be Dragons: Science, Technology and the Future of Humanity, a 2016 book by Olle Häggström
- Here There Be Dragons, written 1968, a children's book by Roger Zelazny
- Here, There Be Dragons, a 2006 fantasy novel by James A. Owen

== Other uses ==
- Here Be Dragons, started in 2014, a BBC Radio Wales comedy sketch show
- Here Be Dragons (album), a 2025 album by Avantasia
- There Be Dragons, a 2011 film by Roland Joffé

== See also ==
- Here be monsters (disambiguation)
- Here there be tygers
