= History of the Movement from 1854 to 1890 =

1980 non-fiction book by Sam Moskowitz

History of the Movement From 1854 to 1890
- Dust-jacket from the first edition
- Author: Sam Moskowitz
- Cover artist: Ned Dameron
- Language: English
- Series: Science Fiction in Old San Francisco
- Subject: Science fiction
- Publisher: Donald M. Grant, Publisher, Inc.
- Publication date: 1980
- Publication place: United States
- Media type: Print (Hardback)
- Pages: 255 pp
- OCLC: 12106945
- Followed by: Into the Sun & Other Stories

Science Fiction in Old San Francisco: Volume One, History of the Movement From 1854 to 1890 is a history of science fiction writers in San Francisco in the period following the American Civil War by Sam Moskowitz. It was first published by Donald M. Grant, Publisher, Inc. in 1980 in an edition of 1,500 copies. This book with its companion volume Into the Sun & Other Stories won a Pilgrim Award for the author in 1981.
