= The Magic Pen of Joseph Clement Coll =

1978 book by Walt Reed

- Dust-jacket from the first edition
- Author: Walt Reed
- Cover artist: Joseph Clement Coll
- Language: English
- Subject: Joseph Clement Coll
- Publisher: Donald M. Grant, Publisher, Inc.
- Publication date: 1978
- Publication place: United States
- Media type: Print (Hardback)
- Pages: 176 pp
- OCLC: 4842155

The Magic Pen of Joseph Clement Coll is a study of American illustrator Joseph Clement Coll by Walt Reed. It was first published by Donald M. Grant, Publisher, Inc. in 1978 in an edition of 750 copies, all of which were numbered and signed by the author.
