= Talbot Mundy: Messenger of Destiny =

- Dust-jacket from the first edition
- Author: compiled by Donald M. Grant
- Cover artist: Ned Dameron
- Language: English
- Subject: Memoir, Bibliography
- Publisher: Donald M. Grant, Publisher, Inc.
- Publication date: 1983
- Publication place: United States
- Media type: Print (Hardback)
- Pages: 253 pp
- ISBN: 0-937986-46-1
- OCLC: 10949942
- Dewey Decimal: 823/.912 B 19
- LC Class: PR6025.U66 Z89 1983

Talbot Mundy: Messenger of Destiny is a collection of memoirs about Talbot Mundy compiled by Donald M. Grant. The book includes a bibliography of Mundy's works. It was released in 1983 by Donald M. Grant, Publisher, Inc. in an edition of 1,475 copies.

== Contents ==
- Introduction, by Donald M. Grant
- "Autobiography", by Talbot Mundy
- "Willie—Rogue and Rebel", by Peter Berresford Ellis
- "Talbot Mundy", by Dawn Mundy Provost
- "Ghosts Walk...", by Darrel Crombie
- "Talbot Mundy in Adventure", by Donald M. Grant
- "The Glory of Tros", by Fritz Leiber
- "Books"
- "Magazine Appearances"
- "The Jerusalem News"
- "The Theosophical Path"
- "The New York Times"
