= Into the Sun & Other Stories =

1980 collection of short stories by Robert Duncan Milne

- Cover of the first edition
- Author: Robert Duncan Milne
- Illustrator: Ned Dameron
- Cover artist: Ned Dameron
- Language: English
- Series: Science Fiction in Old San Francisco
- Genre: Science fiction short stories
- Publisher: Donald M. Grant, Publisher, Inc.
- Publication date: 1980
- Publication place: United States
- Media type: Print (hardback)
- Pages: 253 pp
- OCLC: 5297615
- Preceded by: History of the Movement From 1854 to 1890

Science Fiction in Old San Francisco: Volume Two, Into the Sun & Other Stories is a collection of science fiction short stories by Robert Duncan Milne and edited by Sam Moskowitz. It was first published in 1980 by Donald M. Grant, Publisher, Inc. in an edition of 1,500 copies. All but one of the stories first appeared in the magazine The Argonaut. The other story, "A Question of Reciprocity" first appeared in the San Francisco Examiner. This book with its companion volume History of the Movement From 1854 to 1890 won a Pilgrim Award for its editor, Moskowitz, in 1981.

== Contents ==
- Introduction, by Sam Moskowitz
- "Into the Sun"
- "Plucked from the Burning"
- "A New Palingenesis"
- "Professor Vehr’s Electrical Experiment"
- "A Family Skeleton"
- "A Man Who Grew Young Again"
- "A Base-Ball Mystery"
- "Ten Thousand Years in Ice"
- "The World’s Last Cataclysm"
- "The Silent Witness"
- "A Question of Reciprocity"
