= Jerry Lane (disambiguation) =

Jerry Lane was a baseball player.

Jerry Lane or Layne may also refer to:

- Gerry Lane (World War Z)
- Jerry Layne, baseball umpire
- Jerry Layne (ventriloquist)
- Jerry Max Lane, writer of "Gone as a Girl Can Get"
- Jeremiah 'Jerry' Lane of music duo, High Flyers
- Geraldine 'Jerry' Lane, character in You're Only Young Once
- Jeremy Lane (writer), also known as Jerry Lane

== See also ==
- Jeremy Lane (disambiguation)
