= The Last Adventurer =

Book by Peter Berresford Ellis

The Last Adventurer: The Life of Talbot Mundy
- Dust-jacket from the first edition
- Author: Peter Berresford Ellis
- Cover artist: Ned Dameron
- Language: English
- Subject: Biography, Bibliography
- Publisher: Donald M. Grant, Publisher, Inc.
- Publication date: 1984
- Publication place: United States
- Media type: Print (Hardback)
- Pages: 279 pp
- ISBN: 0-937986-70-4
- OCLC: 12108520
- Dewey Decimal: 823/.912 B 19
- LC Class: PR6025.U66 Z65 1984

The Last Adventurer: The Life of Talbot Mundy is a biography and bibliography of Talbot Mundy by Peter Berresford Ellis. It was released in 1984 by Donald M. Grant, Publisher, Inc. in an edition of 1,075 copies.
