= De Lysle Ferrée Cass =

American novelist

- Born: 1887; Chicago
- Died: 1973 (aged 85–86)
- Occupation: Short story writer
- Writing career
- Pen name: De Lysle F. Cass
- Genre: fantasy

De Lysle Ferrée Cass (1887–1973) was a writer of fantasy short stories.

He had at least six stories published pre-World War I in magazines from the Munsey pulp stable. These include: "Oahula the Carnivorous" (The All-Story March 1913); "Pilgrims in Love" (The All-Story Sep and Oct 1913); "The Love Caprice" (The All-Story November 1913); "Love Goes Blindly" (The All-Story Dec 1913); "The Man Who Could Not Die" (All Story March 1914 and The All-Story Mar 7, 1914); and "The White Spot" (All-Story Cavalier Weekly, Oct 24 and 31, 1914). His stories for the Munsey pulps are marked by a frank eroticism unusual for its time, together with frequent settings in Oriental climes.

== Biography ==
Cass was born in Chicago on March 14, 1887. He attended Amherst College between 1908 and 1910 but left the school before graduation. He also attended Wesleyan College for one year.

He had a varied career largely as an editor and a writer. Out of college, he became associate editor for The Novelty news. There followed a long string of positions as editor or advertising representative for various trade journals, including The Office Outfitter, Towns Magazine, Boot and Shoe Recorder, Cook County Real Estate Board Quarterly, Dry Goods Guide and The Scoop.

In 1913, on serialisation publication of his story "Pilgrims of Love" (a.k.a. "The Love Caprice") in All-Story Weekly, horror writer H.P. Lovecraft roundly condemned the story's frank eroticism: " "Pilgrims in Love" by De Lysle Ferrée Cass, is contemptibly disgusting, unspeakably nauseating...We do not care for subjects so near allied to vulgarity, however 'diplomatically' they may be 'handled'. Of such 'Oriental love' we may speak in the words of the lazy but ingenious schoolboy, who when asked by his tutor to describe the reign of Caligula, replied 'that the less said about it the better'. We prefer a more idealized Orient to read about: let us have 'nature to advantage drest', as in the beautiful romance of "Prince Imbecile" by C. MacLean Savage, or "The Invisible Empire" by Stephen Chalmers."

Apart from the stories published in the Munsey magazines, Cass also published the following stories and poems:"The Visitor at Selangor" (Live Stories); "The Song of the Wedding-Dress" (poem) (Snappy Stories Dec #1 1916); "The Architect of Dreams" (nv) (Young’s Magazine Aug 1919); "Journal of an Expedition Into the Midlands" (The Smart Set Aug 1923); "The Things I Learned at Smith" (humorous) (College Life Nov 1928).

In 1917, just after his pulp stories began appearing, he founded and published a newspaperman's magazine, The Deadline. A year later he joined Fairchild Publications, and later worked for Modern Publications.

In 1923 he founded Babyhood, the only infants and maternity magazine in the United States at that time. During World War II, Cass worked as an information specialist for the Office of Public Affairs in Washington. After that came a number of jobs in industry, ending with a stint in the advertising department of the Off Appliance Publishing Company from 1946 to 1958, whereupon he retired.

In addition to The Airship Boys in the Great War, or the Rescue of Bob Russell (a novel, 1915, as by De Lysle F. Cass) and the stories he did for Munsey, Cass is listed as author of numerous newspaper features beginning in 1913, unspecified material for periodicals as varied as Short Stories, College Humor, Collier's and Good Housekeeping, as well as the author of two books, The Baby Book (1941) and Waggish Tales from the Czech (1949).

=== As It Is Written ===
His novel As It Is Written was published by Donald M. Grant, Publisher, Inc. in 1982 under the name "Clark Ashton Smith". The manuscript for the novel was discovered in the files of The Thrill Book magazine and mistakenly believed by several Clark Ashton Smith experts to be the work of Clark Ashton Smith using Cass as a pseudonym. After the novel was published, the mistake was discovered.

== Personal life ==
In 1916 he married Norma Dorgan, who had once written an effusive letter about his work to the All-Story Weekly. They had a daughter, Denny.

Cass died on March 20, 1973, aged 86.
