= Winter Reckoning =

1986 novel by Noel-Anne Brennan

- Dust-jacket from the first edition
- Author: Noel-Anne Brennan
- Illustrator: Jon J. Muth
- Cover artist: Jon J. Muth
- Language: English
- Genre: Science fantasy novel
- Publisher: Donald M. Grant, Publisher, Inc.
- Publication date: 1986
- Publication place: United States
- Media type: Print (hardback)
- Pages: 253 pp
- ISBN: 0-937986-85-2
- OCLC: 15626843
- Dewey Decimal: 813/.54 19
- LC Class: PS3552.R3818 W56 1986

Winter Reckoning is the first science fantasy novel by Noel-Anne Brennan. It was first published in 1986 by Donald M. Grant, Publisher, Inc. in an edition of 650 copies which were signed by the author.

== Plot introduction ==
The novel concerns the adventures of Molly Kerbridge, a member of the Planetary Federation, on a world called Tringe. There she encounters the Fnick, a reptilian race intent on conquest.
