= A Gent from Bear Creek =

1937 short story collection by Robert E. Howard

- First edition cover image
- Author: Robert E. Howard
- Language: English
- Series: Breckinridge Elkins
- Genre: Western short stories
- Publisher: Herbert Jenkins
- Publication date: 1937
- Publication place: United Kingdom
- Media type: Print (hardback)
- Pages: 312 pp

A Gent from Bear Creek is a collection of Western short stories by Robert E. Howard. It was first published in the United Kingdom in 1937 by Herbert Jenkins. The first United States edition was published by Donald M. Grant, Publisher, Inc. in 1965. The stories continue on from each other, like chapters in a book.

== Overview ==
The stories are humorously written as if told by Breckinridge Elkins, a hillbilly with no schooling. He and his kin live in the Humboldts in Nevada. Elkins is six feet six inches tall, is as strong as a grizzly bear, and he can be just as bad tempered if riled. And there is a lot to rile him, especially his relatives.

Though a dead shot, he prefers to use his fists, feet, teeth, etc. In numerous fights he attacks whole groups of armed men and commits mayhem. No one actually dies but limbs are broken, jaws shattered, faces are trod on, skulls fractured, ribs broken, and so on. Even buildings do not always survive such an attack. He picks up many injuries himself, but being shot, getting many cuts with Bowie knives, head bashed with numerous objects, having his ear chewed, scratched up by a mountain lion he then threw into a room full of feuding men and such are just minor nuisances to him.

He previously rode an old mule called Alexander, the only animal that could carry him till he came across Cap'n Kidd, his equine equivalent, and tamed him. Elkins is the only man tough enough to ride the giant, pugnacious horse. Glory McGraw (a local girl) is his sometimes love interest but he is often too dumb to see it.

== Contents ==
- "Striped Shirts and Busted Hearts"
- "Mountain Man"
- "Meet Cap'n Kidd"
- "Guns of the Mountains"
- "A Gent from Bear Creek"
- "The Feud Buster"
- "The Road to Bear Creek"
- "The Scalp Hunter"
- "Cupid From Bear Creek"
- "The Haunted Mountain"
- "Educate or Bust"
- "War on Bear Creek"
- "When Bear Creek Came to Chawed Ear"
