= The Devil in Iron (collection) =

1976 short story collection by Robert E. Howard

- Dust-jacket from the first edition
- Author: Robert E. Howard
- Illustrator: Dan Green
- Cover artist: Dan Green
- Language: English
- Series: Donald M. Grant Conan
- Genre: Fantasy
- Publisher: Donald M. Grant, Publisher, Inc.
- Publication date: 1976
- Publication place: United States
- Media type: Print (hardback)
- Pages: 154 pp

The Devil in Iron is a 1976 collection of two fantasy short stories written by Robert E. Howard featuring his sword and sorcery hero Conan the Barbarian. The book was published in 1976 by Donald M. Grant, Publisher, Inc. as volume V of their deluxe Conan set. The stories both originally appeared in the magazine Weird Tales.

== Contents ==
- "Shadows in Zamboula"
- "The Devil in Iron"

Preceded by Red Nails	Grant Conan series (publication order)	Succeeded by Rogues in the House
