= Shadows of Dreams (poetry collection) =

Book by Robert E. Howard

- Dust-jacket from the first edition
- Author: Robert E. Howard
- Illustrator: Rick Berry
- Cover artist: Rick Berry
- Language: English
- Genre: poetry
- Publisher: Donald M. Grant, Publisher, Inc.
- Publication date: 1989
- Publication place: United States
- Media type: Print (Hardback)
- Pages: 95 pp
- ISBN: 0-937986-94-1
- OCLC: 21899487

Shadows of Dreams is a collection of poems by Robert E. Howard. It was published in 1989 by Donald M. Grant, Publisher, Inc. in an edition of 850 copies. Most of the poems are original to this collection. Others originally appeared in the magazines The Poets' Scroll, Fantasy Book, Witchcraft & Sorcery and The Howard Collector.

== Contents ==
- Introduction, by Glenn Lord
- "Shadows of Dreams"
- "Flaming Marble"
- "A Weird Ballad"
- "A Warning to Orthodoxy"
- "Whispers"
- "A Riding Song"
- "Castaway"
- "Black Seas"
- "Silence Falls on Mecca’s Walls"
- "Keresa, Keresita"
- "Whispers on the Nightwinds"
- "Nights to Both of Us Known"
- "To Lyle Saxon"
- "Symbols"
- "A Stirring of Green Leves"
- "The Gladiator and the Lady"
- "A Song of the Anchor Chain"
- "The Path of the Strange Wanderers"
- "I Praise My Nativity"
- "Ballade"
- "Destiny"
- "Stay Not from Me"
- "The Last Words He Heard"
- "The Ecstacy of Desolation"
- "Musings"
- "Dreaming in Israel"
- "The Dust Dance"
- "A Challenge to Bast"
- "The Odyssey of Israel"
- "Romany Road"
- "Twilight on Stonehenge"
- "The Call of Pan"
- "Samson’s Broodings"
- "The Road to Babel"
- "The Dreams of Men"
- "A Far Country"
- "To a Nameless Woman"
- "Song of a Fugitive Bard"
- "A Poet’s Skull"
- "A Fable for Critics"
- "Love"
- "Song from an Ebony Heart"
- "Love’s Young Dream"
- "A Ballad of Beer"
- "John Brown"
- "Abe Lincoln"
- "Surrender"
