= The Undying Land =

1985 novel

- Dust-jacket from the first edition
- Author: William Gilmour
- Illustrator: Kevin Eugene Johnson
- Cover artist: Kevin Eugene Johnson
- Language: English
- Genre: Lost race novel
- Publisher: Donald M. Grant, Publisher, Inc.
- Publication date: 1985
- Publication place: United States
- Media type: Print (Hardback)
- Pages: 208 pp
- ISBN: 0-937986-62-3
- OCLC: 14520857
- Dewey Decimal: 813/.54 19
- LC Class: PS3557.I463 U5 1985

The Undying Land is a Lost race novel by William Gilmour. It was first published in 1985 by Donald M. Grant, Publisher, Inc. in an edition of 1,300 copies.

== Plot introduction ==
The novel concerns the adventures of Starrett, an aviator who becomes lost in Africa and discovers a lost civilization.

== Reception ==
Science Fiction Review critic Darrell Schweitzer wrote, "with very minor changes, The Undying Land would pass perfectly for an obscure novel published in All Story in 1911. He has got the whole routine down perfectly: competently readable prose, wooden characterization, impossible dialogue, wild implausibilities, and even a trace of Age of Imperialism racism." The book was reviewed by Dan Chow in Locus and Don D'Ammassa in Science Fiction Chronicle.
