= A Golden Anniversary Bibliography of Edgar Rice Burroughs =

- Dust-jacket from the first edition
- Author: Henry Hardy Heins
- Cover artist: J. Allen St. John
- Language: English
- Subject: Bibliography, Edgar Rice Burroughs
- Publisher: Donald M. Grant, Publisher, Inc.
- Publication date: 1964
- Publication place: United States
- Media type: Print (Hardback)
- Pages: 418 pp
- OCLC: 946716

A Golden Anniversary Bibliography of Edgar Rice Burroughs is a bibliography of the works of Edgar Rice Burroughs by Henry Hardy Heins. It was first published by Donald M. Grant, Publisher, Inc. in an edition of 1,000 copies. The book was revised from a mimeograph edition that Heins had produced in September 1962. The book lists books, stories, and articles by Burroughs. It also contains information about Burroughs and a section on magazine illustrations and publisher's announcements.
