= Red Blades of Black Cathay =

- Dust-jacket from the first edition
- Author: Robert E. Howard and Tevis Clyde Smith
- Illustrator: David Karbonik
- Cover artist: David Karbonik
- Language: English
- Genre: Fantasy
- Publisher: Donald M. Grant, Publisher, Inc.
- Publication date: 1971
- Publication place: United States
- Media type: Print (hardback)
- Pages: 125 pp
- OCLC: 221137

Red Blades of Black Cathay is a collection of Fantasy short stories by Robert E. Howard and Tevis Clyde Smith. It was first published in 1971 by Donald M. Grant, Publisher, Inc. in an edition of 1,091 copies. The title story originally appeared in the magazine Oriental Stories.

== Contents ==
- Introduction, by Tevis Clyde Smith
- "Red Blades of Black Cathay"
- "Diogenes of Today"
- "Eighttoes Makes a Play"
