= William Gilmour (writer) =

American novelist

- Occupations: Short story writer, novelist
- Writing career
- Genres: Lost race, fantasy

William Gilmour is a writer of lost race fantasy short stories and novels. A key figure in the Edgar Rice Burroughs pastiche community, he published Tarzan pastiches in the magazine Burroughs Bulletin. His lost race novel, The Undying Land was published by Donald M. Grant, Publisher, Inc. in 1985.
