= The Iron Man & Other Tales of the Ring =

- Cover of the first edition
- Author: Robert E. Howard
- Illustrator: David Ireland
- Cover artist: David Ireland
- Language: English
- Publisher: Donald M. Grant, Publisher, Inc.
- Publication date: 1976
- Publication place: United States
- Media type: Print (hardback)
- Pages: 186 pp
- OCLC: 36992408

The Iron Man & Other Tales of the Ring is a collection of short stories about boxing by Robert E. Howard. It was first published in 1976 by Donald M. Grant, Publisher, Inc. in an edition of 1,600 copies.

== Contents ==
- Introduction, by Donald M. Grant
- "Men of Iron"
- "The Iron Man"
- "They Always Come Back"
- "Fists of the Desert"
