= The Last Celt =

The Last Celt: A Bio–Bibliography of Robert Ervin Howard
- Dust-jacket from the first edition
- Author: Glenn Lord
- Cover artist: Marcus Boas
- Language: English
- Subject: Bibliography and Biography, Robert E. Howard
- Publisher: Donald M. Grant, Publisher, Inc.
- Publication date: 1976
- Publication place: United States
- Media type: Print (Hardback)
- Pages: 416 pp
- OCLC: 2552561

The Last Celt: A Bio–Bibliography of Robert Ervin Howard is a biography and bibliography of Robert E. Howard by Glenn Lord. It was first published by Donald M. Grant, Publisher, Inc. in 1976 in an edition of 2,600 copies.

== Contents ==
- Introduction, by E. Hoffmann Price
- Foreword, by Glenn Lord
- The Wandering Years
- An Autobiography
- A Touch of Trivia
- Letter: Robert E. Howard to Farnsworth Wright
- "On Reading and Writing", by Robert E. Howard
- Facts of Biography
- "A Biographical Sketch of Robert E. Howard", by Alvin Earl Perry
- "Robert Ervin Howard: A Memoriam", by H. P. Lovecraft
- "Lone Star Fictioneer", by Glenn Lord
- "A Memory of R.E. Howard", by E. Hoffmann Price
- "The Last Celt, by Howard Preece
- The Bibliography
  - Books
  - Fiction Verse
  - Articles
  - Letters
  - Index by Periodicals
  - Translations
  - Unpublished Fiction with first lines
  - Unpublished Verse
  - Unpublished Articles
  - Series Index
  - Lost Manuscripts
  - Unborn Books
  - Comics
  - Television Adaptation
  - The Junto
  - About the Author including
    - Books
    - amateur publications
    - amateur press
    - articles
    - pastiches of Conan
  - Miscellanea, including
    - fragments
    - photo album
    - etc.

== Reception ==
Richard A. Lupoff described The Last Celt as "a good general introduction and reference work on Howard."
