= Robert Duncan Milne =

American novelist

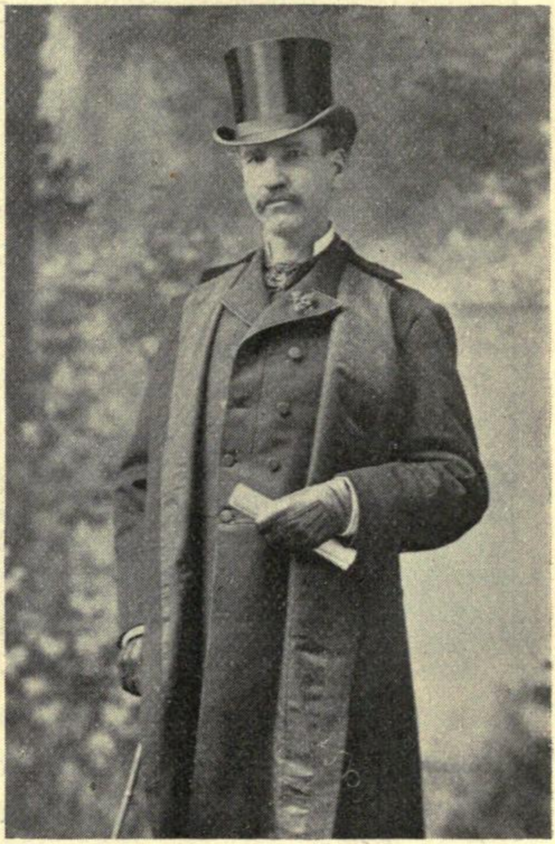
- Born: 7 June 1844; Cupar, Fife, Scotland
- Died: 15 December 1899 (aged 55); San Francisco, California

Robert Duncan Milne (7 June 1844–15 December 1899) was a late-19th century San Francisco science fiction writer whose work was published primarily in newspapers of the time, and the magazine The Argonaut. He was born in Cupar, Scotland, and moved to San Francisco in the 1860s, where he remained until his death.

Milne is considered one of the earliest full-time science fiction writers in America. His stories explored speculative concepts such as climate catastrophe, cryogenics, and drone warfare, making him a successor to writers like Jules Verne and a precursor to those such as H.G. Wells. Despite his forward-thinking themes, much of his work remained obscure and was unavailable for long after his death.

== Rediscovery ==
Milne was rediscovered by science fiction historian Sam Moskowitz, who collected some of his work in the 1980 volume Into the Sun & Other Stories. In January 2025, Bloomsbury Academic published The Essential Robert Duncan Milne: Stories by the Lost Pioneer of Science Fiction, the most comprehensive collection of Milne's work to date. Edited by Dr. Keith Williams and Ari Brin, the anthology reflects eight years of archival research and renewed interest into Milne’s contributions to the early development of science fiction.

== Bibliography ==
- Milne, Robert Duncan (1980). Into the Sun & Other Stories. selected and introduced by Sam Moskowitz, illus. Ned Dameron. West Kingston, R.I.: Donald M. Grant.
- Williams, Keith, and Brin, Ari, eds. (2025). The Essential Robert Duncan Milne: Stories by the Lost Pioneer of Science Fiction. London: Bloomsbury Academic.
- (fr) Histoire d'un visionnaire oublié, 2024 : a biography of Robert Duncan Milne imagined by Augusta Boveresse.
