= Here Be Monsters =

Here Be Monsters may refer to:

- Here Be Monsters (Ed Harcourt album), 2001
- Here Be Monsters (Motorpsycho album), 2016
- Here Be Monsters (Ten album), 2022
- Here Be Monsters!, a novel by Alan Snow
- Here Be Monsters (Buffy novel), a novel based on the American television series Buffy the Vampire Slayer
- Here Be Monsters (Stasheff novel), a novel by Christopher Stasheff

== See also ==
- Here be dragons (disambiguation)
