= The Return of Tharn =

1956 novel by Howard Browne

- Dust-jacket from the first edition
- Author: Howard Browne
- Cover artist: Henry M. Eichner
- Language: English
- Series: Tharn
- Genre: Fantasy
- Publisher: The Grandon Company
- Publication date: 1956
- Publication place: United States
- Media type: Print (Hardback)
- Pages: 253
- OCLC: 5973344
- Preceded by: Warrior of the Dawn

The Return of Tharn is a fantasy novel by American writer Howard Browne. It was first published in book form in 1956 by The Grandon Company in an edition of 500 copies, although 150 of the copies were lost to flood damage and perhaps another 150 show some water damage.

The novel was originally serialized in three parts in the magazine Amazing Stories beginning in October, 1948. The book is a sequel to Browne's Warrior of the Dawn (1943).

The novel concerns the prehistoric adventures of Tharn.

== Sources ==
- Chalker, Jack L.; Mark Owings (1998). The Science-Fantasy Publishers: A Bibliographic History, 1923-1998. Westminster, MD and Baltimore: Mirage Press, Ltd. p. 316.
- Clute, John; Peter Nicholls (1995). The Encyclopedia of Science Fiction. New York: St. Martin's Griffin. p. 165. ISBN 0-312-13486-X.
- Tuck, Donald H. (1974). The Encyclopedia of Science Fiction and Fantasy. Chicago: Advent. p. 69. ISBN 0-911682-20-1.
