= Lovecraft's Providence and Adjacent Parts =

Book by Henry L. P. Beckwith, Jr.

- Dust-jacket from the first edition
- Author: Henry L. P. Beckwith, Jr.
- Cover artist: David Ireland
- Language: English
- Subject: H. P. Lovecraft, Providence
- Publisher: Donald M. Grant, Publisher, Inc.
- Publication date: 1979
- Publication place: United States
- Media type: Print (Hardback)
- Pages: 89 pp
- OCLC: 6079346

Lovecraft's Providence and Adjacent Parts is a book by Henry L. P. Beckwith, Jr. detailing sites in Providence, Rhode Island related to H. P. Lovecraft. It was first published by Donald M. Grant, Publisher, Inc. in 1979 in an edition of 1,000 copies. The book grew out of a bus tour of Providence that Beckwith held as part of the World Fantasy Convention and is still a useful for handbook for those who visit Lovecraft-related sites around Providence.

The book offers detailed information on locations frequented by Lovecraft in his correspondence and stories. Such specific locations include St. John's churchyard, where Edgar Allan Poe and Lovecraft both visited. Lovecraft and his friends Adolphe de Castro and Robert H. Barlow composed acrostics in memoriam to Poe while visiting the churchyard. The book also provides details on structures of note such as the house on Benefit St, Providence which provided the inspiration for Lovecraft's story "The Shunned House."

As an early study of Lovecraft geography, the book's influence precedes its publication, with Beckwith being acknowledged by L. Sprague de Camp for his assistance in de Camp's 1976 Lovecraft: A Biography, and continues to this day in Faye Ringel's 2017 chapter on Early American Gothic in The Cambridge Companion to Gothic Fiction.The book is cited in the work of most scholars in the field, such as S.T. Joshi, Leslie S. Klinger, and Peter Cannon.

A revised and expanded edition was published by Grant in 1986 and again in 1990 for Lovecraft's centennial.
