= Galad Elflandsson =

Canadian fantasy writer

- Born: 1951 (age 74–75); New York, New York
- Occupations: novelist, short story writer
- Writing career
- Genre: Fantasy

Galad Elflandsson (born 1951) is a Canadian fantasy writer.

== Literary career ==
In the 1980s, Elflandsson was a member of a group of fantasy writers who met at the House of Speculative Fiction bookstore in Ottawa, Ontario, Canada, which he also managed. Other members of the group included Gordon Derevanchuk, Charles de Lint, Charles R. Saunders and John Bell. The group hosted the 10th World Fantasy Convention in 1984. Elflandson's novel, The Black Wolf, was published by Donald M. Grant, Publisher, Inc. in 1979.

== Bibliography ==
=== Novels ===
- The Black Wolf (1979)

=== Collections ===
- Tales of Carcosa (2018)

=== Short stories ===
- "A Tapestry of Dreams" (1978)
- "How Darkness Came to Carcosa" (1978)
- "Nightfear" (1978)
- "The Piper of Dray" (1978)
- "The Virgins of Po" (1978)
- "The Answer" (1979)
- "The Dance" (1979)
- "The Basilisk" (1979)
- "The Hand of the King" (1979)
- "The Valley of the Sorrows" (1979)
- "The Exile" (1979)
- "The Way of Wizards" (1980)
- "The Flat on Rue Chambord" (1980)
- "Night Rider on a Pale Horse" (1980)
- "An Act of Faith" (1982)
- "The Reaver's Curse" (1984)
- "Something in a Song" (1985)
- "Icarus" (1986)
- "The Last Time I Saw Harris" (1986)
- "Waiting" (1986)
- "The Devil Don't Dance with Strangers" (1986)
- "An Overruling Passion" (1987)
- "Hitch-Hiker" (unknown)

=== Verse ===
- "Beyond the Walls of Clouds" (1978)
- "A Shade's Lament" (1978)
- "Release" (1978)
- "The Good Ship 'Revenger': or, What the Crew Don't Know Won't Hurt Me" (1991)
