= The Sowers of the Thunder (short story collection) =

- Cover of the first edition
- Author: Robert E. Howard
- Illustrator: Roy G. Krenkel
- Cover artist: Roy G. Krenkel
- Language: English
- Genre: Historical fiction
- Publisher: Donald M. Grant, Publisher, Inc.
- Publication date: 1973
- Publication place: United States
- Media type: Print (hardback)
- Pages: 285 pp
- OCLC: 715202

The Sowers of the Thunder is a collection of historical short stories by Robert E. Howard. It was first published in 1973 by Donald M. Grant, Publisher, Inc. in an edition of 2,509 copies. Grant reprinted the book in 1976 in an edition of 1,250 copies.

== Contents ==
- Introduction, by Roy G. Krenkel
- The Lion of Tiberias"
- "The Sowers of the Thunder"
- "Lord of Samarcand"
- "The Shadow of the Vulture"
