= The Borders Just Beyond =

- Dust-jacket from the first edition
- Author: Joseph Payne Brennan
- Illustrator: Randy Broecker
- Cover artist: Randy Broecker
- Language: English
- Genre: Fantasy, Horror short stories
- Publisher: Donald M. Grant, Publisher, Inc.
- Publication date: 1986
- Publication place: United States
- Media type: Print (Hardback)
- Pages: 200 pp
- ISBN: 0-937986-80-1
- OCLC: 15078434

The Borders Just Beyond is a collection of fantasy and horror short stories by Joseph Payne Brennan. It was first published in 1986 by Donald M. Grant, Publisher, Inc. in an edition of 750 copies, all of which were signed by the author. Many of the stories originally appeared in the magazines Whispers, Alfred Hitchcock's Mystery Magazine, Macabre, Pinnacle, Arkham Sampler and Fantasy Macabre.

== Contents ==
- "The Barren Land"
- "Road to Granville"
- "Marianne"
- "The Other Things"
- "Survival"
- "Long Hollow Swamp"
- "The New Arrivals"
- "The Jugular Man"
- "Going Home"
- "Vampires from the Void"
- "Blizzard at Shaysville"
- "Extermination"
- "Hobbies"
- "The Recess Bell"
- "The Bellmore Case"
- "Hugen"
- "The Gulf of Night"
- "The House on Stillcroft Street"
- "Cast Me Away"
- "Silver Death"
- "The Hero"
- "Election Incident"
- "The King of Cubomba"
- "Lottman’s End"
- "The Business About Fred"
