= Madame Two Swords =

Book by Tanith Lee

- Cover of the first edition
- Author: Tanith Lee
- Illustrator: Thomas Canty
- Cover artist: Thomas Canty
- Language: English
- Genre: Fantasy novelette
- Publisher: Donald M. Grant, Publisher, Inc.
- Publication date: 1988
- Publication place: United States
- Media type: Print (Hardback)
- Pages: 128 pp
- ISBN: 0-937986-79-8
- OCLC: 20115174
- LC Class: PR6062.E4163 M33 1988

Madame Two Swords is a fantasy novelette by Tanith Lee. It was first published in 1988 by Donald M. Grant, Publisher, Inc. in an edition of 600 copies and was issued without a jacket. All copies were signed by the author and the artist. The story is a fantasy set during the French Revolution.
