= Way Up High =

1992 novel by Roger Zelazny

- Cover of first edition (hardcover)
- Author: Roger Zelazny
- Illustrator: Vaughn Bodē
- Cover artist: Vaughn Bodē
- Language: English
- Genre: Children
- Publisher: D. M. Grant
- Publication date: 1992
- Publication place: United States
- Media type: Print
- Pages: 45
- ISBN: 1-880418-00-2
- OCLC: 40589566

Way Up High is a children's book by American writer Roger Zelazny. It is one of only two stories that he wrote for children—the other being Here There Be Dragons—and one of just three of his books without heroic protagonists. One thousand copies of each children's book (signed by Zelazny) were published in 1992, with illustrations by Vaughn Bodē.

Zelazny wrote Here There Be Dragons and Way Up High in 1968-1969. He admired the work of underground comics artist Vaughn Bodē, and he commissioned him to illustrate the two books. The drawings were exhibited at the 1969 World Science Fiction Convention in St. Louis; but before the books could be published, Bodē told Zelazny that although Zelazny owned the pictures, he did not have the reproduction rights. In his literary biography of Zelazny, Christopher S. Kovacs explains the issue: “Zelazny saw the book as two of his tales illustrated by Bodē, but Bodē viewed it as a showcase of his art illuminated by Zelazny’s text.” The publication of the books foundered when Zelazny and Bodē insisted on equal royalties. Bodē died in 1975, and his estate agreed to the publication of the books with Bodē’s illustrations in 1992. Zelazny dedicated Way Up High to his daughter, Shannon, and Here There Be Dragons to her best friend, Lexie Strumor.

== Plot synopsis ==
Susi comes across Herman, a young, lonesome pterodactyl, sunning himself on a rock on her way home from school during the last week of the spring semester. They become fast friends. Susi rides on the back of the pterodactyl during the days of summer. She is astonished by the great height of their flights that makes things on the ground seem so tiny.

Susi asks if pterodactyls are magic. He replies that he has magic—pterodactyl magic. Susi asks if she has magic. Herman says that she has human magic, but she has to learn it for herself.

One day Herman takes Susi for one last flight, the first time at night. The lights below are as tiny and bright and numerous as the stars above. She sees beauty in the lights of the city. Herman says that pterodactyls do not build cities and he can not feel about the cities as she does. She says she has never felt this way about cities before. Herman says he thinks she is beginning to find her magic.

When they land Herman explains that the weather is too cold for him, and he must follow the birds south to a warmer climate. Promising to come the next summer, Herman says good-bye. That night Susi dreams she finds her magic.

== Reception ==
Carolyn Cushman of Locus magazine describes Way Up High as “cute” and “interesting.” She adds that “the story is quite acceptably educational – a little too much so for most adults.” Darrell Schweitzer of Aboriginal Science Fiction magazine writes that Way Up High and its companion piece, Here There Be Dragons, “are charming, and worthy of widespread circulation.”

== Sources ==
- Cushman, Carolyn (1992). "Reviews by Carolyn Cushman". Locus. 29 (6).
- Kovacs, Christopher S. (2009). ". . .And Call Me Roger: The Literary Life of Roger Zelazny". In David G. Grubbs; Christopher S. Kovacs; Ann Crimmins (eds.). The Collected Stories of Roger Zelazny, Vol. 3: This Mortal Mountain. Framingham, MA: NESFA. ISBN 978-1-886778-78-8.
- Lindskold, Jane M. (1993). Roger Zelazny. New York: Twayne Publishers. ISBN 0-8057-3953-X.
- Schweitzer, Darrell (1993). "Books". Aboriginal Science Fiction (43 and 44): 57.
- Zelazny, Roger (1992). Way Up High. Hampton Falls, N.H: D.M. Grant. ISBN 1-880418-00-2.
- D'Ammassa, Don (2005). "Roger Zelazny". The Encyclopedia of Science Fiction. New York: Facts On File, Inc. pp. 432–434. ISBN 0-8160-5924-1.
- Grant, John, ed. (1997). "Roger Zelazny". The Encyclopedia of Fantasy. New York: St. Martin's Press. ISBN 0-312-19869-8.
- Kovacs, Christopher S. The Ides of Octember: A Pictorial Bibliography of Roger Zelazny . Boston: NESFA Press, 2010. ISBN 978-1-886778-92-4
- Krulik, Theodore (1986). Roger Zelazny. New York: Ungar Publishing. ISBN 0-8044-2490-X.
- Levack, Daniel J. H. (1983). Amber Dreams: A Roger Zelazny Bibliography. San Francisco: Underwood/Miller. pp. 34–35. ISBN 0-934438-39-0.
- Sanders, Joseph (1980). Roger Zelazny: A Primary and Secondary Bibliography. Boston: G. K. Hall and Co. ISBN 9780816180813.
- Stephens, Christopher P. (1991). A Checklist of Roger Zelazny. New York: Ultramarine Press. ISBN 9780893661663.
- Yoke, Carl (1979). Roger Zelazny: Starmont Reader's Guide 2. West Linn, Oregon: Starmont House. ISBN 9780916732042.
- Yoke, Carl (1979). Roger Zelazny and Andre Norton: Proponents of Individualism. Columbus, Ohio: State University of Ohio.
