= Rogues in the House (collection) =

1976 short story collection by Robert E. Howard

- Dust-jacket from the first edition
- Author: Robert E. Howard
- Illustrator: Marcus Boas
- Cover artist: Marcus Boas
- Language: English
- Series: Donald M. Grant Conan
- Genre: Fantasy
- Publisher: Donald M. Grant, Publisher, Inc.
- Publication date: 1976
- Publication place: United States
- Media type: Print (hardback)
- Pages: 91 pp

Rogues in the House is a 1976 collection of two fantasy short stories written by Robert E. Howard featuring his sword and sorcery hero Conan the Barbarian. The book was published in 1976 by Donald M. Grant, Publisher, Inc. as volume VI of their deluxe Conan set. The title story originally appeared in the magazine Weird Tales in 1934.

== Contents ==
- "Rogues in the House"
- "The Frost-Giant's Daughter"

| Preceded by The Devil in Iron | Grant Conan series (publication order) | Succeeded by Queen of the Black Coast |
