= A Monster at Christmas =

1985 poem by Thomas Canty

- First edition cover
- Author: Thomas Canty
- Illustrator: Phil Hale
- Cover artist: Phil Hale
- Language: English
- Genre: Fantasy, Horror
- Publisher: Donald M. Grant, Publisher, Inc.
- Publication date: 1985
- Publication place: United States
- Media type: Print (Hardback)
- Pages: 44
- ISBN: 0-937986-67-4
- OCLC: 13782049

A Monster at Christmas is a fantasy horror poem by Thomas Canty. The poem, a stranger Christmas fantasy was first published in 1985 by Donald M. Grant, Publisher, Inc. Though a well-known artist, Canty chose Phil Hale to illustrate his book. While the book's colophon states that 1,050 copies were printed, the actual number was 890. All copies were numbered and signed by the author and artist.
