= Tevis Clyde Smith =

American novelist

Tevis Clyde Smith, Jr.
- Born: February 11, 1908
- Died: December 24, 1984 (aged 76)
- Occupations: Short story writer, amateur publisher
- Writing career
- Genre: Fantasy

Tevis Clyde Smith Jr. (February 11, 1908 – December 24, 1984) was an American historian, fantasy writer, poet, and amateur publisher, known for his association with Robert E. Howard. Most of his writing appeared as by Tevis Clyde Smith; he also wrote as T. C. Smith Jr., and under his full name, Tevis Clyde Smith Jr. He lived in Brownwood, Brown County, Texas.

== Writing career ==
Smith self-published several chapbooks on the history, biography and genealogy of Brown County, Texas, and others of his poetry and short fiction. As a young man he collaborated on three short stories with Robert E. Howard. Late writings focused on his association with Howard.

== Smith and Howard ==
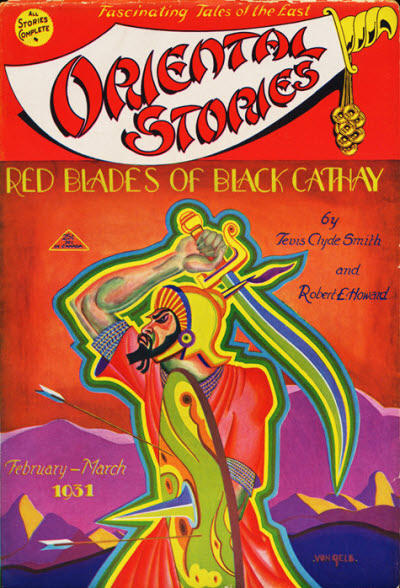
The Howard/Smith novelette "Red Blades of Black Cathay" was the cover story on the February–March 1931 issue of Oriental Stories

Smith met Robert E. Howard while both attended Brownwood High School and they remained friends until Howard's death. At the time, Smith was publishing a small amateur journal. He and Howard collaborated on a story that was meant to run in Smith's magazine, Under the Great Tiger, though they abandoned the project. Smith did other collaborations with Howard, one of which they sold to the magazine Oriental Stories. Several of their collaborations were collected in Red Blades of Black Cathay, published by Donald M. Grant, Publisher, Inc. in 1971.

== Bibliography ==
=== History ===
- Frontier's Generation : The Pioneer History of Brown County, with Sidelights on the Surrounding Territory (1931; enlarged edition 1980; reprint of 1931 edition with added index 1982)
- From the Memories of Men (1954)
- Pecan Valley Days (1956)

=== Biography ===
- Report on a Writing Man and Other Reminiscences of Robert E. Howard (1991)

=== Other nonfiction ===
- "How the Stories Came to Be" (introduction to Red Blades of Black Cathay) (1971)
- "Foreword" (to Shadow of the hun by Robert E. Howard) (1975)
- "Background to 'Questions'" (1976)
- "Foreword" (to One Who Walked Alone: Robert E. Howard, The Final Years by Novalyne Price Ellis) (1986)

=== Fiction ===
- "Red Blades of Black Cathay" (with Robert E. Howard) (short story) (1931; 1975 chapbook)
- The Cardboard God (collection) (1970)
- "Diogenes of today" (with Robert E. Howard) (short story) (1971)
- "Eighttoes makes a play" (with Robert E. Howard) (short story) (1971)
- Red Blades of Black Cathay (with Robert E. Howard) (collection) (1971)

=== Poetry ===
- Images out of the sky (1966 collection)
- Don't blame the python (1975 collection)
- "Questions (To Robert E. Howard)" (1976)
- "Rescue By a Certain Lady" (1976)
