= As It Is Written =

1982 novel by De Lysle Ferree Cass

- Dust-jacket from the first edition
- Author: De Lysle Ferree Cass (mistakenly attributed to Clark Ashton Smith)
- Illustrator: R.J. Krupowicz
- Cover artist: R.J. Krupowicz
- Language: English
- Genre: Fantasy
- Publisher: Donald M. Grant, Publisher, Inc.
- Publication date: 1982
- Publication place: United States
- Media type: Print (hardback)
- Pages: 125 pp
- ISBN: 0-937986-44-5
- OCLC: 9063610

As It Is Written is an Oriental fantasy novel by pulp writer De Lysle Ferrée Cass mistakenly republished under the name of Weird Tales writer Clark Ashton Smith. It was first published in 1982 by Donald M. Grant, Publisher, Inc. in an edition of 1,250 copies (1,200 of which were for sale), all of which were signed by the illustrator, R.J. Krupowicz. The book includes an introduction by Will Murray and an afterword by Donald Sidney-Fryer. The novel was discovered in the files of The Thrill Book magazine, where it had been accepted in 1919, by Murray and Daryl S. Herrick.

Based on various evidence including handwriting and typewriter comparisons, and similarities of subject matter and style, they believed the novel to be the work of Clark Ashton Smith using Cass as a pseudonym. Murray showed the manuscript to Donald M. Grant and Sidney-Fryer who both agreed it to be the work of Smith. It was only after Grant published the novel that the attribution to Smith was discovered to be spurious.

Murray has speculated that Smith and Cass may have come into correspondence but there are no letters between the two writers published in The Selected Letters of Clark Ashton Smith (Arkham House, 2003).

== Premise ==
The novel concerns the adventures of Datu Buang who, as a fugitive, stumbles across the remains of an alien lost city in the jungles of Malaysia and battles furiously with a semi-intelligent ape-creature.
