= Walt Reed =

American art historian

- Born: 1917
- Died: 2015 (aged 97–98)
- Occupations: art historian, writer
- Writing career
- Subject: illustration
- Notable works: The Illustrator in America, 1860-2000

Walt Reed (1917-2015) was an art historian and author of books on illustration. Reed was the author of several works on illustration and illustrators including Harold von Schmidt, John Clymer, and Joseph Clement Coll. In 1974, he founded the gallery Illustration House in Westport, Connecticut. His book on Coll, The Magic Pen of Joseph Clement Coll, was published by Donald M. Grant, Publisher, Inc. in 1978.
