= The Goddess of Ganymede =

1967 novel by Mike Resnick

- Dust-jacket from the first edition
- Author: Mike Resnick
- Cover artist: Neal MacDonald Jr.
- Language: English
- Genre: Science fiction
- Publisher: Donald M. Grant, Publisher, Inc.
- Publication date: 1967
- Publication place: United States
- Media type: Print (Hardback)
- Pages: 246
- OCLC: 429811
- Preceded by: Pursuit on Ganymede

The Goddess of Ganymede is a science fiction novel by American writer Mike Resnick, first published in 750 copies in 1967 by Donald M. Grant, Publisher. It concerns Adam Thane, a mercenary who fights for the woman he loves against the immortals of Ganymede.

== Sources ==
- Chalker, Jack L.; Mark Owings (1998). The Science-Fantasy Publishers: A Bibliographic History, 1923-1998. Westminster, MD and Baltimore: Mirage Press, Ltd. p. 320.
- Tuck, Donald H. (1978). The Encyclopedia of Science Fiction and Fantasy. Chicago: Advent. p. 362. ISBN 0-911682-22-8.
