= The Temple of the Ten =

Book by H. Bedford-Jones

- Dust-jacket from the first edition
- Author: H. Bedford-Jones and W. C. Robertson
- Illustrator: Richard Robertson
- Cover artist: Richard Robertson
- Language: English
- Genre: Fantasy novel
- Publisher: Donald M. Grant, Publisher, Inc.
- Publication date: 1973
- Publication place: United States
- Media type: Print (Hardback)
- Pages: 159 pp
- OCLC: 2012697

The Temple of the Ten is a fantasy novel by H. Bedford-Jones and "W. C. Robertson" (believed to be a pseudonym of Bedford-Jones). It was first published in book form in 1973 by Donald M. Grant, Publisher, Inc. in an edition of 1,000 copies. The novel originally appeared in the magazine Adventure on March 3, 1921.

== Plot introduction ==
The novel adventures in the realms of Prester John.
