= Echoes from an Iron Harp =

Book by Robert E. Howard

- Dust-jacket from the first edition
- Author: Robert E. Howard
- Illustrator: Alicia Austin
- Cover artist: Alicia Austin
- Language: English
- Genre: Poetry
- Publisher: Donald M. Grant, Publisher, Inc.
- Publication date: 1972
- Publication place: United States
- Media type: Print (Hardback)
- Pages: 109 pp
- OCLC: 402778

Echoes from an Iron Harp is a collection of poems by Robert E. Howard with illustrations by Alicia Austin. It was published in 1972 by Donald M. Grant, Publisher, Inc. in an edition of 1,079 copies. Two of the poems previously appeared in Fire and Sleet and Candlelight, edited by August Derleth.

== Contents ==
- Introduction, by Glenn Lord
- "Age Comes to Rabelais"
- "Belshazzar"
- "But the Hills Were Ancient Then"
- "Cimmeria"
- "A Dawn in Flanders"
- "The Day That I Die"
- "Dreams of Nineveh"
- "The Dust Dance"
- "The Dweller in Dark Valley"
- "Earth–born"
- "Fables for Little Folk"
- "'Feach Air Muir Lionadhi Gealach Buidhe Mar Or'"
- "Futility"
- "Heritage"
- "Illusion"
- "John Ringold"
- "Kid Lavigne Is Dead"
- "The Kissing of Sal Snooboo"
- "A Lady's Chamber"
- "The Last Day"
- "Lost Altars"
- "Memories"
- "A Moment"
- "Moonlight on a Skull"
- "Not Only in Death They Die"
- "Private Magrath of the A.E.F."
- "Reuben's Brethren"
- "Roundelay of the Roughneck"
- "The Sands of Time"
- "The Sea"
- "The Skull in the Clouds"
- "Skulls and Dust"
- "Skulls over Judah"
- "Slumber"
- "A Song of Defeat"
- "The Song of Horsal's Galley"
- "A Song of the Legions"
- "A Song for Men That Laugh"
- "A Sonnet of Good Cheer"
- "Sonora to Del Rio"
- "Surrender"
- "Tarantella"
- "Thor's Son"
- "Timur–Lang"
- "To Certain Orthodox Brethren"
- "A Vision"
- "A Warning"
- "Where Are Your Knights, Donn Othna?"
- "Who Is Grandpa Theobald?"
- "The Years Are as a Knife"
- "Headings"
