= Howard Browne =

American novelist

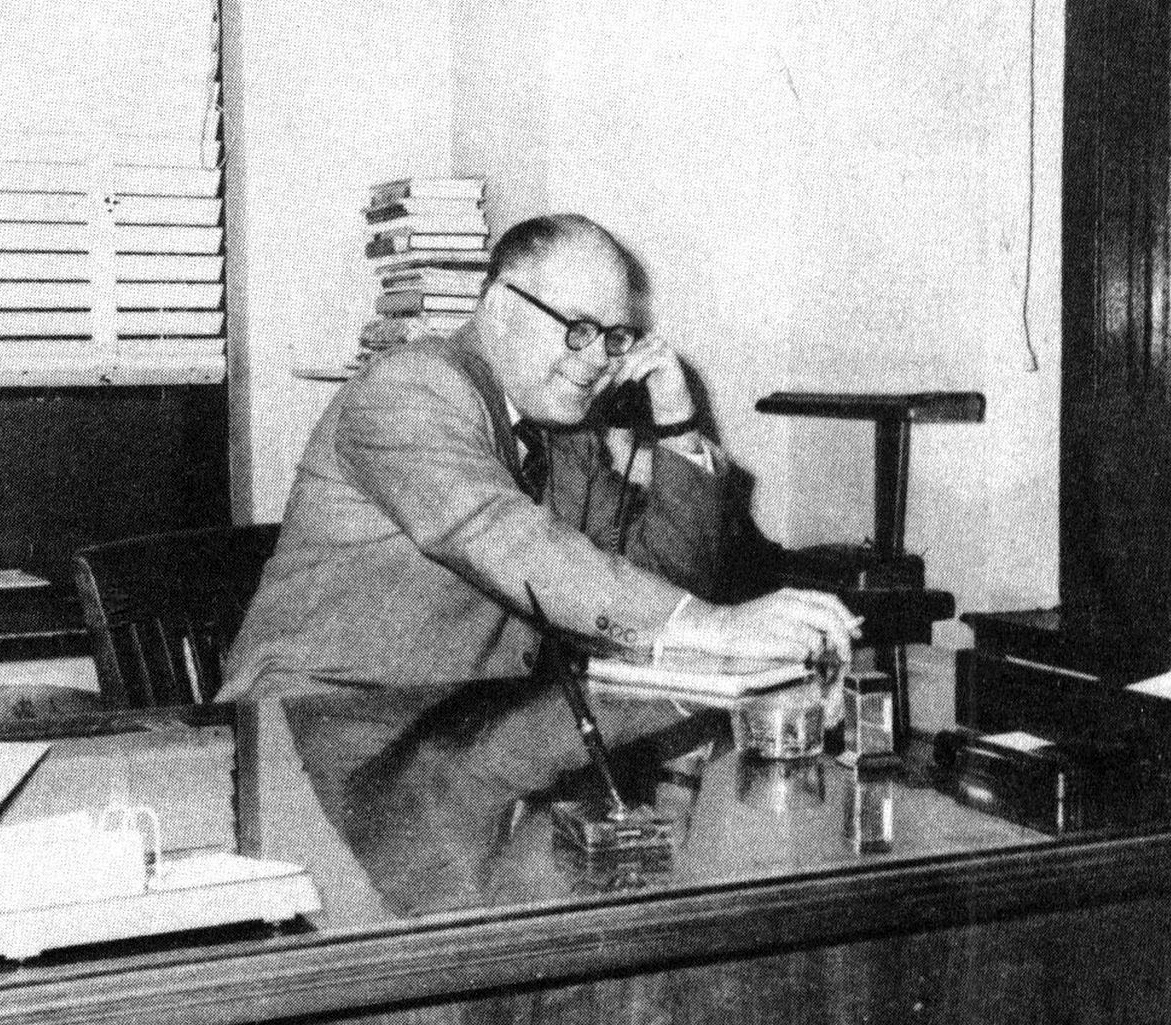
- Browne circa 1952
- Born: April 15, 1908; Omaha, Nebraska, United States
- Died: October 28, 1999 (aged 91); Santiago, California, United States
- Occupations: Editor, writer
- Writing career
- Language: English
- Genres: Science fiction, mystery fiction, film, television

Howard Browne (April 15, 1908 – October 28, 1999) was an American science fiction editor and mystery writer. He also wrote for several television series and films. Some of his work appeared under the pseudonyms John Evans, Alexander Blade, Lawrence Chandler, Ivar Jorgensen, and Lee Francis.

== Biography ==
Beginning in 1942, Browne worked as managing editor for Ziff Davis publications on Amazing Stories and Fantastic Adventures, both under Raymond A. Palmer's editorship. When Palmer left the magazines in 1949, Browne took over in January 1950. Browne ended the publication of Richard Shaver's Shaver Mystery and oversaw the change in Amazing from a pulp magazine to a digest. He left the magazines in 1956 to move to Hollywood.

In Hollywood, Browne wrote for television shows including Maverick ("The Seventh Hand" with James Garner and Diane Brewster among nine other episodes), Ben Casey, and The Virginian. His last credit was for the film Capone (1975), starring Ben Gazzara.

Browne's novel Thin Air was adapted for television three times. In 1955 it was the basis for the episode "Thin Air" of Climax. In 1975 it was used as the basis for a first-season episode of The Rockford Files titled "Sleight of Hand." In 1982 it was the basis for a second-season episode of Simon & Simon of the same name as the novel.

== Works by Howard Browne ==
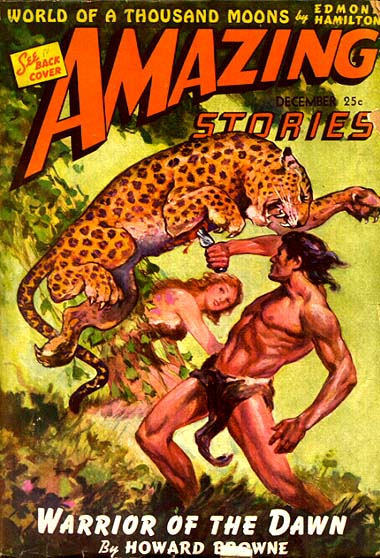
The first installment of Browne's "Warrior of the Dawn" was cover-featured in the December 1942 issue of Amazing Stories

- Warrior of the Dawn (1943)
- Return to Liliput (1943) (as by William Brengle)
- If You Have Tears (1947) (as by John Evans)
- The Man from Yesterday (1948) (as by Lee Francis)
- Forgotten Worlds (1948) (as by Lawrence Chandler)
- Gun Job (1956)
- The Return of Tharn (1956)
- Thin Air (1954)
- Pork City (1988)
- Scotch on the Rocks (1991)
- Murder Wears a Halo (1997)
- Carbon-Copy Killer & Twelve Times Zero (1997)
- Incredible Ink (1997)

Detective Paul Pine novels and stories:

- Halo in Blood (1946) (as by John Evans)
- Halo for Satan (1948) (as by John Evans)
- Halo in Brass (1949) (as by John Evans)
- The Taste of Ashes (1957)
- The Paper Gun (1985)
