= Phil Hale =

American figurative painter (born 1963)

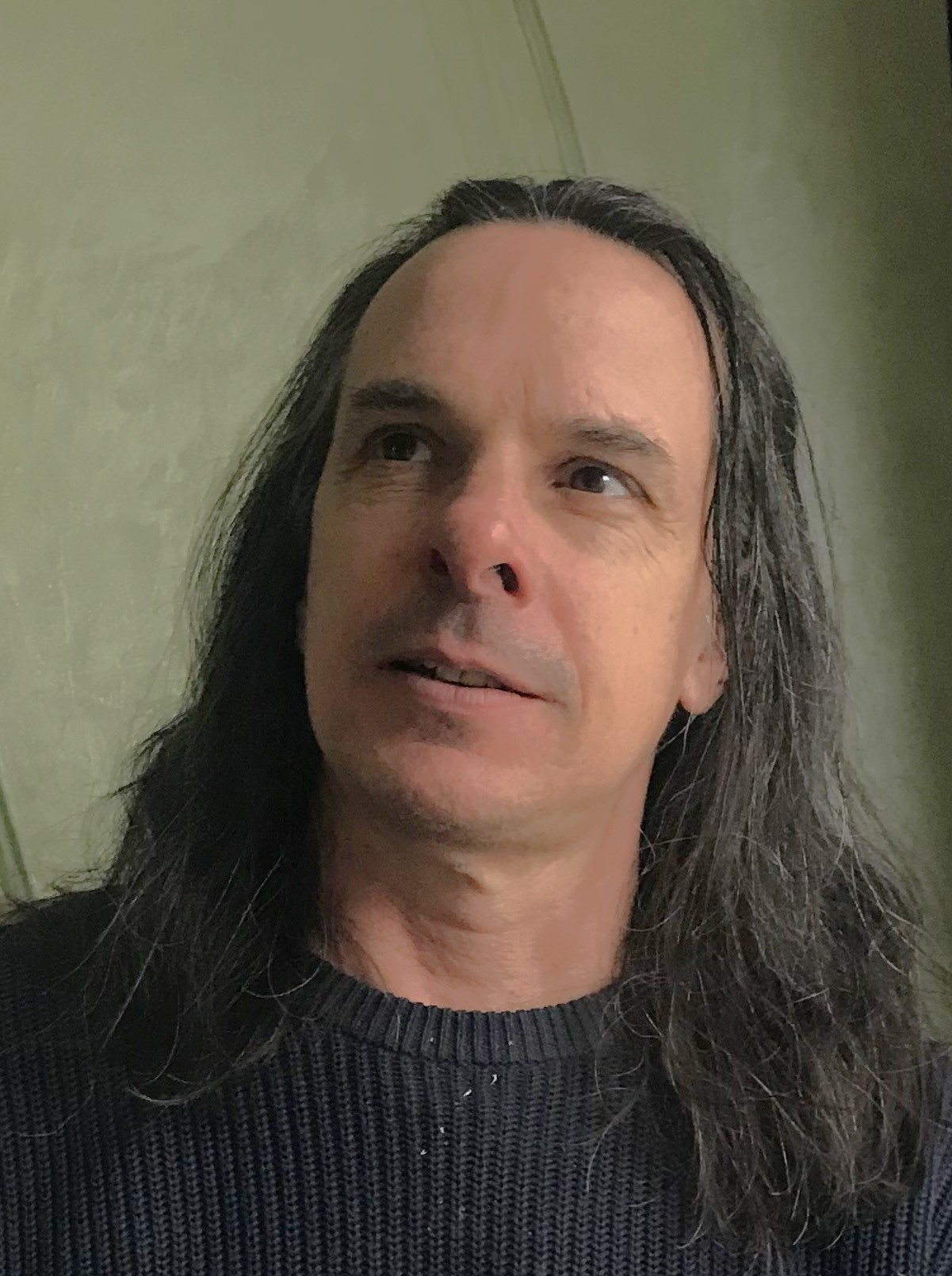
- Hale in 2017
- Born: 1963 (age 62–63); Boston, Massachusetts
- Education: Apprenticed to Richard Berry
- Known for: Portraiture, fine art, photography, drawing
- Notable work: Official portrait of Prime Minister Tony Blair (2007)
- Movement: Figurative painting
- Awards: Third Place BP Portrait Award (2000), Joint Second Place BP Portrait Award (2001)
- Patrons: Peter Hall, Adam Jones
- Website: philhalestudio.com

Philip Oliver Hale (born 1963) is an American figurative painter who currently resides in London, England.

== Early life and education ==
Hale was born in Boston, Massachusetts in 1963. He is related to a number of American painters, including Ellen Day Hale, Lilian Westcott Hale, Philip Leslie Hale and Robert Beverly Hale. His mother and grandmother were also artists.

Hale spent the formative years of his childhood in Nairobi, Kenya, where his parents were stationed for work.

== Early work ==
At age 16, Hale was apprenticed to American painter Rick Berry in Boston, where he lived for three years until migrating to the United Kingdom.

During this period, he illustrated a number of book covers for American novelist Stephen King, including The Dark Tower II: The Drawing of the Three published in 1987 and his gift edition of Insomnia.

== Current work ==
Hale's current work focuses on figure as well, in depictions of slightly surreal scenes with strange characters performing various physical feats, usually in a confrontation of some sort.

In 2007, Hale was commissioned by the House of Commons to paint the official portrait of former UK Prime Minister Tony Blair. The finished painting was unveiled in Westminster on April 23, 2008. Blair sat for the portrait during his final months in office in 2007.

In 2014, Hale was recruited by G-Star RAW to produce their Spring/Summer '14 campaign "The Challenge". He created a series of photographic collages of a chess match between Chess World Champion Magnus Carlsen, and model Lily Cole.

In 2015, he exhibited 15 oil paintings and at 18 pencil drawings in an exhibition titled Life Wants to Live. The exhibition showed at Jonathan LeVine's Gallery in New York and was later published as a book.

He also recently formed the movie production company "unprofessional.com" with his son Callum Hale Thomson. It specialises in bespoke analogue filmmaking.

Hale's work is featured in major collections including the Palace of Westminster, National Portrait Gallery, Lord's Cricket Ground, Sony and Warner Bros.

== Published works ==
=== Major works ===
- Double Memory: Art and Collaboration by Rick Berry and Phil Hale
- A Monster at Christmas by Phil Hale and Thom Canty
- Goad: The Many Moods of Phil Hale by Phil Hale
- Mockingbirds/Relaxeder by Phil Hale
- Sparrow: Phil Hale by Phil Hale
- The Dark Tower II: The Drawing of the Three by Stephen King, interior illustrations by Phil Hale
- Urge Ourselves Under by Phil Hale
- Empire by Phil Hale
- Black Crack by Phil Hale
- Use Music to Kill by Phil Hale (2020)

=== Audio ===
- Golden Phone Plays Mockingbirds by Golden Phone (a band in which Phil Hale and Jon Wygens play)

=== Book covers ===
- Arbitrary Crude by Enders Buzcienski
- By the Time I got to Phoenix by Paolo Belhassaine
- Candyass, 2 a.m. by Willem Barough
- Conspicuity by Sanford Pel
- Farther the Shoals, Darker than This by Duane Michael Edley
- Fondle by Sanford Pel
- Goya by B. Grutbauer
- Hero is Angry by Y.Carlos Cantor
- Heart of Darkness by Joseph Conrad
- Hong on the Range by William F Wu
- I am Drugs by Jayne Reeser
- Insomnia by Stephen King
- Lungs, Lips and Liver by Rena Davrin
- Makes Me Want to Cry by Bob Mertz
- Mofo by Hooglander Ivanov
- New Black Car by James Higgins (as yet unpaid)
- Relaxeder by Carsten Glock
- Shrivel and Deplete by B. Grutbauer
- Tendresse by Gene Scott Tzerati
- The Male and Female Uro-genital systems: Collected Essays 1992–97 by Rafael Onlhy
- The Male and Female Uro-genital systems: Collected Essays 1997–99 by Rafael Onlhy
- The Pornographic Diagram is Incorrect by Rena Davrin

He was commissioned by Penguin Classics to paint new covers for new editions of six Joseph Conrad books, published in 2007: Heart of Darkness and The Congo Diary, Typhoon and Other Stories, Lord Jim, Under Western Eyes, The Nigger of the 'Narcissus' and Other Stories, Nostromo and The Secret Agent.

=== Comic Books ===
Covers

- Flinch #1, #11
- Strange Adventures (1999 series) #2
- Swamp Thing/Lucifer Preview
- Weird War Tales (2000 series)
- Swamp Thing (2000 series) #1, #2, #3
- Vertigo Secret Files: Hellblazer #1
- Legends of the DC Universe #33, #34, #35, #36
- Vertigo: Secret Files & Origins: Swamp Thing #1
- Batman: Legends of the Dark Knight #168
- Halo Graphic Novel

Interiors

- "Reunion", Epic Illustrated #22
- "In the Future", Epic Illustrated #29
- "Knock Knock", Epic Illustrated #29
- "Johnny Badhair", Epic Illustrated #33

=== Magazines ===
Covers

- Epic December 1985

Interiors

- Playboy (July 98)
- Playboy (Sep 98)
- Playboy (Feb 5)
- Imbroglio Magazine (June 5)
- Imbroglio Magazine (April 9)
- Tripwire Magazine (July 9)

=== Other published work ===
- Poster for Spectrum 13: Call for Entries
- Featured in certain issues of Spectrum annual
- Poster for Lucca Comics and Games 2009
- "Understand?" album by Naked Raygun, illustrations by Phil Hale
