= Mayhem on Bear Creek =

1979 collection of short stories by Robert E. Howard

- Cover of the first edition
- Author: Robert E. Howard
- Illustrator: Tim Kirk
- Cover artist: Tim Kirk
- Language: English
- Series: Breckinridge Elkins
- Genre: Western short stories
- Publisher: Donald M. Grant, Publisher, Inc.
- Publication date: 1979
- Publication place: United States
- Media type: Print (hardback)
- Pages: 226 pp
- OCLC: 5326134

Mayhem on Bear Creek is a collection of Western short stories by Robert E. Howard. It was first published in 1979 by Donald M. Grant, Publisher, Inc. in an edition of 1,900 copies. The stories had not previously been collected.

== Contents ==
- "No Cowherders Wanted!"
- "Mayhem and Taxes"
- "Evil Deeds at Red Cougar"
- "The Peaceful Pilgrim"
- "While Smoke Rolled"
- "A Elkins Never Surrenders"
- "Sharp's Gun Serenade"
