= E. C. Vivian =

British fantasy author

- Born: 19 October 1882
- Died: 21 May 1947 (aged 64)
- Writing career
- Pen name: Jack Mann, Charles Henry Cannell, A.K. Walton, Sydney Bingdom
- Genres: Fantasy, Supernatural, Detective

Evelyn Charles Henry Vivian (19 October 1882 – 21 May 1947) was the pseudonym of Charles Henry Cannell, a British editor and writer of fantasy and supernatural, detective novels and stories.

== Biography ==
Prior to becoming a writer, Cannell was a former soldier in the Boer War and journalist for The Daily Telegraph. Cannell began writing novels under the pen-name "E. Charles Vivian" in 1907. Cannell started writing fantastic stories for the arts magazine Colour and the aviation journal Flying (which Cannell edited after leaving the Telegraph) in 1917–1918, sometimes publishing them under the pseudonym "A.K. Walton". Vivian is best known for his Lost World fantasy novels such as City of Wonder and his series of novels featuring supernatural detective Gregory George Gordon Green or "Gees" which he wrote under his "Jack Mann" pseudonym. Vivian also wrote several science-fiction stories, including the novel Star Dust about a scientist who can create gold. Influences on Vivian's work included Rider Haggard, H. G. Wells, Arthur Machen and the American novelist Arthur O. Friel. Vivian also published fiction under several other pseudonyms, including Westerns as "Barry Lynd". Adrian has noted that some of the pseudonyms Cannell used "will never now be identified". For younger readers, Vivian wrote Robin Hood and his Merry Men in 1927, a retelling of the Robin Hood legend. Vivian's Robin Hood and his Merry Men was reprinted several times.

Vivian also edited three British pulp magazines. From 1918 to 1922 Vivian edited The Novel Magazine, and later, for the publisher Walter Hutchinson (1887–1950), Hutchinson's Adventure-Story Magazine (which serialised three of Vivian's novels) and Hutchinson's Mystery-Story Magazine. In addition to UK writers, Vivian often reprinted fiction from American pulp magazines such as Adventure and Weird Tales in the Hutchinson publications.

Page 9 of The Times for Tuesday 17 January 1933 notes that Mrs Lilian Simmons was found not guilty of trying to blackmail Vivian. Following the jury's verdict the Recorder noted "I have great satisfaction in depriving Mr Evelyn Charles Vivian, author, of his costs." The Recorder also asked the jury foreman if he believed that Vivian had been lying, received the answer, "Absolutely and entirely."

Outside the field of fiction, Vivian wrote for the book A History of Aeronautics.

Some of the popular errors about his life are now corrected in the first and only full-length biography, The Shadow of Mr Vivian: The Life of E. Charles Vivian (1882–1947) by Peter Berresford Ellis, PS Publishing Ltd, Hornsea, UK, 2014.

== Reception ==
Critic Jack Adrian has praised Cannell's lost-world stories, as "bursting with ideas and colour and pace", and "superb examples of a fascinating breed".

== Works ==
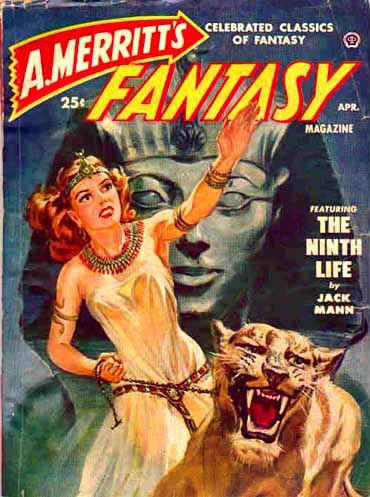
The Ninth Life, under the "Jack Mann" byline, was reprinted in the April 1950 issue of A. Merritt's Fantasy Magazine

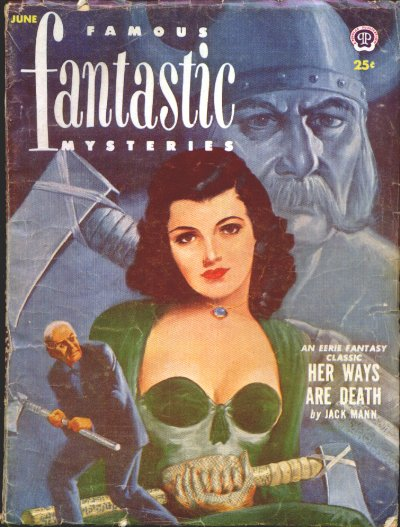
Another "Jack Mann" novel, Her Ways Are Death, was reprinted in the June 1952 issue of Famous Fantastic Mysteries

=== Gees Series ===
1. Gees First Case (1936)
2. Grey Shapes (1937)
3. Nightmare Farm (1937)
4. The Kleinart Case (1938)
5. Maker of Shadows (1938)
6. The Ninth Life (1939)
7. The Glass Too Many (1940)
8. Her Ways Are Death (1940)

=== Rex Coulson ===
1. Coulson Goes South (1933)
2. Reckless Coulson (1933)
3. Dead Man's Chest (1934)
4. Egyptian Nights (1934)
5. Coulson Alone (1936)
6. Detective Coulson (1936)

=== Fields of Sleep ===
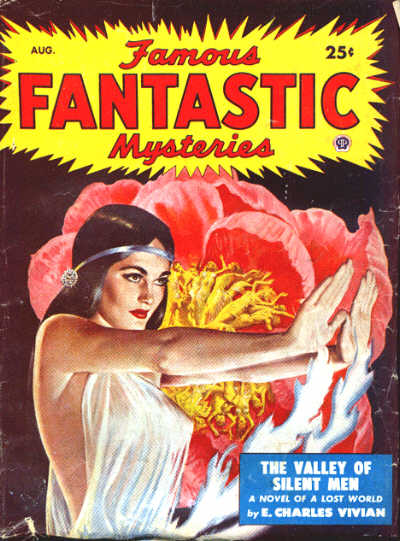
Fields of Sleep was reprinted in the August 1949 issue of Famous Fantastic Mysteries, under the title "The Valley of Silent Men"

1. Fields of Sleep (Fantasy, 1923)
2. People of the Darkness (Fantasy, 1924)

=== Terence Byrne ===
1. Girl in the Dark (1933)
2. The Man With the Scar (1940)
3. Vain Escape (1952)

=== Jerry Head ===
1. Accessory After (1934)
2. Shadow on the House (1934)
3. Seventeen Cards (1935)
4. Cigar for Inspector Head (1935)
5. Who Killed Gatton? (1936)
6. With Intent to Kill (1936)
7. 38 Automatic (1937)
8. Tramp's Evidence/The Barking Dog Murder Case (1937)
9. Evidence in Blue/The Man in Grey (1938)
10. The Rainbow Puzzle (1938)
11. Problem by Rail (1939)
12. Touch and Go (1939)

=== Robin Hood ===
1. Adventures of Robin Hood (1906)
2. Robin Hood and His Merry Men (1927)

=== Others ===
- The Shadow of Christine (1907)
- The Woman Tempted Me (1909)
- Wandering of Desire (1910)
- Following Feet (1911)
- Passion-Fruit (1912)
- Divided Ways (1914)
- The Young Man Absalom (1915)
- The Yellow Streak: A story of the South African veld (1921)
- City of Wonder (Fantasy, 1922)
- Broken Couplings (1923)
- The Guarded Woman (1923)
- A Scout of the '45 (Historical Novel, 1923)
- Barker's Drift (1924)
- The Lady of the Terraces (Fantasy, 1925)
- Ash (1925)
- Star Dust (1925)
- A King There Was (Fantasy, 1926) [sequel to The Lady of the Terrace]
- The Passionless Quest (1926)
- The Forbidden Door (Fantasy, 1927)
- Shooting Stars (Film Adaptation, 1928)
- Man Alone (1928)
- Nine Days (1928)
- The Moon and Chelsea (1928)
- The Tale of Fleur (Fantasy, 1929)
- Woman Dominant (Fantasy, 1930)
- Guardian of the Cup (1930)
- One Tropic Night (1930)
- Double or Quit (1930)
- Delicate Fiend (1930)
- Unwashed Gods (1931)
- Innocent Guilt (1931)
- And the Devil (1931)
- Infamous Fame (1932)
- False Truth (1932)
- Ladies in the Case (1933)
- The Keys of the Flat (1933)
- Jewels Go Back (1934)
- The Capsule Mystery (1935)
- The Black Prince (Historical, 1936)
- The Impossible Crime (1940)
- And Then There Was One (1941)
- Curses Come Home (1942)
- Dangerous Guide (1943)
- Samson (1944)
- She Who Will Not— (1945)
- Other Gods (1945)
- Arrested (1949)
- Vain Escape (1952)

=== Westerns ===
(as Barry Lynd)

- Dude Ranch (1938)
- Trailed Down (1938)
- Riders to Bald Butte (1939)
- Ghost Canyon (1939)
- The Ten-Buck Trail (1941)
- George on the Trail (1942)

=== Non-fiction ===
- The British Army from Within (c. 1914)
- Peru (1914)
- With the Royal Army Medical Corps at the Front (c, 1915)
- With the Scottish Regiments at the Front (1916)
- A History of Aeronautics (1921)
