= Singers in the Shadows =

Book by Robert E. Howard

- Dust-jacket from the first edition
- Author: Robert E. Howard
- Illustrator: Robert Bruce Acheson
- Cover artist: Dave Karbonik
- Language: English
- Genre: poetry
- Publisher: Donald M. Grant, Publisher, Inc.
- Publication date: 1970
- Publication place: United States
- Media type: Print (Hardback)
- Pages: 55 pp
- OCLC: 123393

Singers in the Shadows is a collection of poems by Robert E. Howard. It was published in 1970 by Donald M. Grant, Publisher, Inc. in an edition of 549 copies. The collection was reprinted by Science Fiction Graphics, Inc. OCLC 3328724 in 1977.

== Contents ==
- Introduction, by Glenn Lord
- "Zukala's Hour"
- "Night Mood"
- "The Sea–Woman"
- "The Bride of Cuchulain"
- "The Stranger"
- "Shadows"
- "Rebel"
- "White Thunder"
- "The Men That Walk With Satan"
- "Thus Spake Sven The Fool"
- "Sacrifice"
- "The Witch"
- "The Lost Galley"
- "Hadrian's Wall"
- "Attila Rides No More"
- "The Fear That Follows"
- "Destination"
- "The Tavern"
- "The Road to Hell"
- "The Twin Gates"
