= Joseph Clement Coll =

American book and newspaper illustrator (1881–1921)

- Born: July 2, 1881
- Died: October 19, 1921 (aged 40)
- Known for: Pen and ink illustration

Joseph Clement Coll (July 2, 1881 – October 19, 1921) was an American book and newspaper illustrator. He was known for his pen and ink story illustrations that were used to illustrate adventure stories such as Conan Doyle's Sir Nigel.

== Early life ==
Joseph Clement Coll was born on July 2, 1881, in Philadelphia to an Irish immigrant family. Both his father and his brothers worked as book binders. As a child, Coll read many illustrated books and magazines. He graduated Central High School, where he took basic art courses, and started work without any academic art training.

== Illustration career ==
Joseph Clement Coll began his professional career working for the New York American as a newspaper artist apprentice at age 17. At this time, his position would be similar to a modern-day news photographer, as his job was to illustrate current events each day within the daily deadline. That same year, he moved to Chicago temporarily. In 1901, he came back to Philadelphia to work on The North American and soon drew the eye of his editor, J. Thomson Willing, who sent him on special missions to procure his skill. The two remained friends even after Coll stopped doing newspaper illustrations. He was soon working for magazines such as Collier's, Everybody's and the American Sunday Magazine. Coll's reputation stands mainly on his pen & ink story illustrations.

In contrast to most illustrators who worked in pen & ink, Coll achieved true tonal gradations in his illustrations by using pen strokes to build up a complete range of values. He was influenced by the Spanish pen & ink artist Daniel Vierge. According to Walt Reed, Coll's "technical virtuosity nor the romantic fantasy of his point of view has ever been rivaled".

Coll was also a painter and he often did paintings for the cover or frontispiece of books which were reproduced in color and then pen & inks to illustrate the text. He was considered an ideal illustrator for authors such as Arthur Conan Doyle and other adventure writers. His illustrations for books such as Talbot Mundy's King of the Khyber Rifles and Sax Rohmer's The Insidious Dr. Fu Manchu were widely reprinted for many years. Coll died in 1921 of appendicitis, aged 40.

== Technique ==
Before Coll started an illustration, he would contemplate on the design of the composition for a long while, which allowed him to draw without a model. Later in his career, when he was able to use a model, he would draw a shaded image of the model with pencils on tracing paper, after which he would darken the backs of the tracing paper and retrace onto bristol board or illustration board. He would do the same earlier in his career but used his inner vision instead of model. He then would start the final ink drawing, for which he used fountain pens.

== Gallery ==
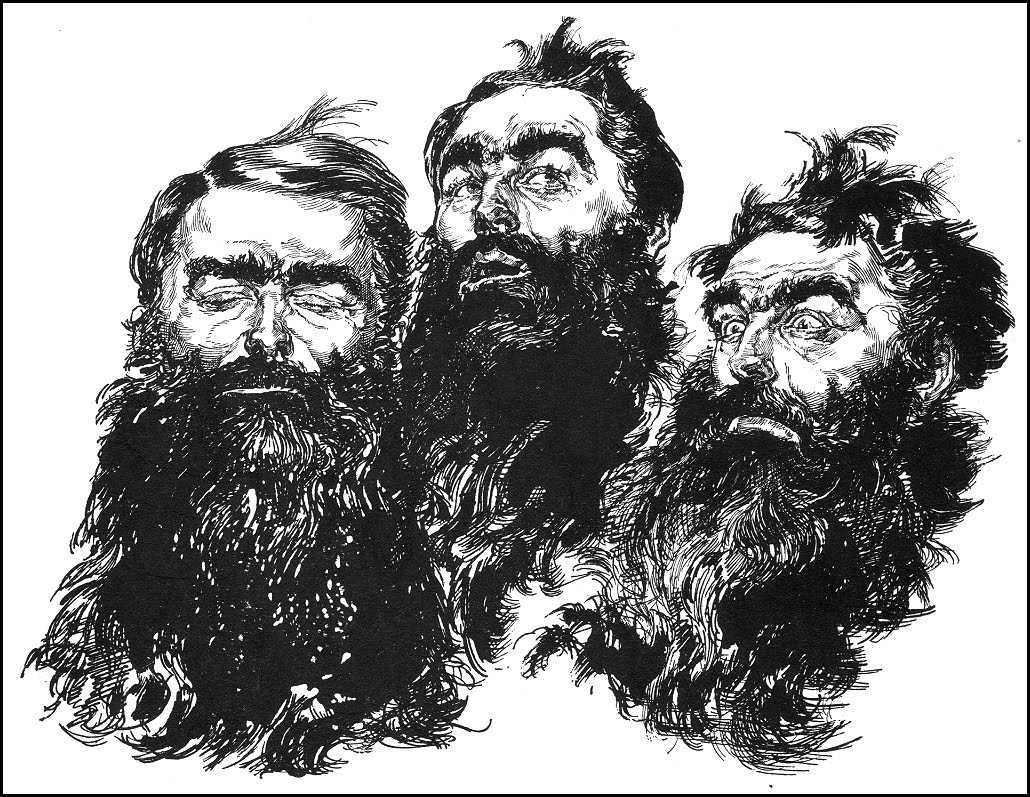
Professor Challenger, before 1921, ink on paper

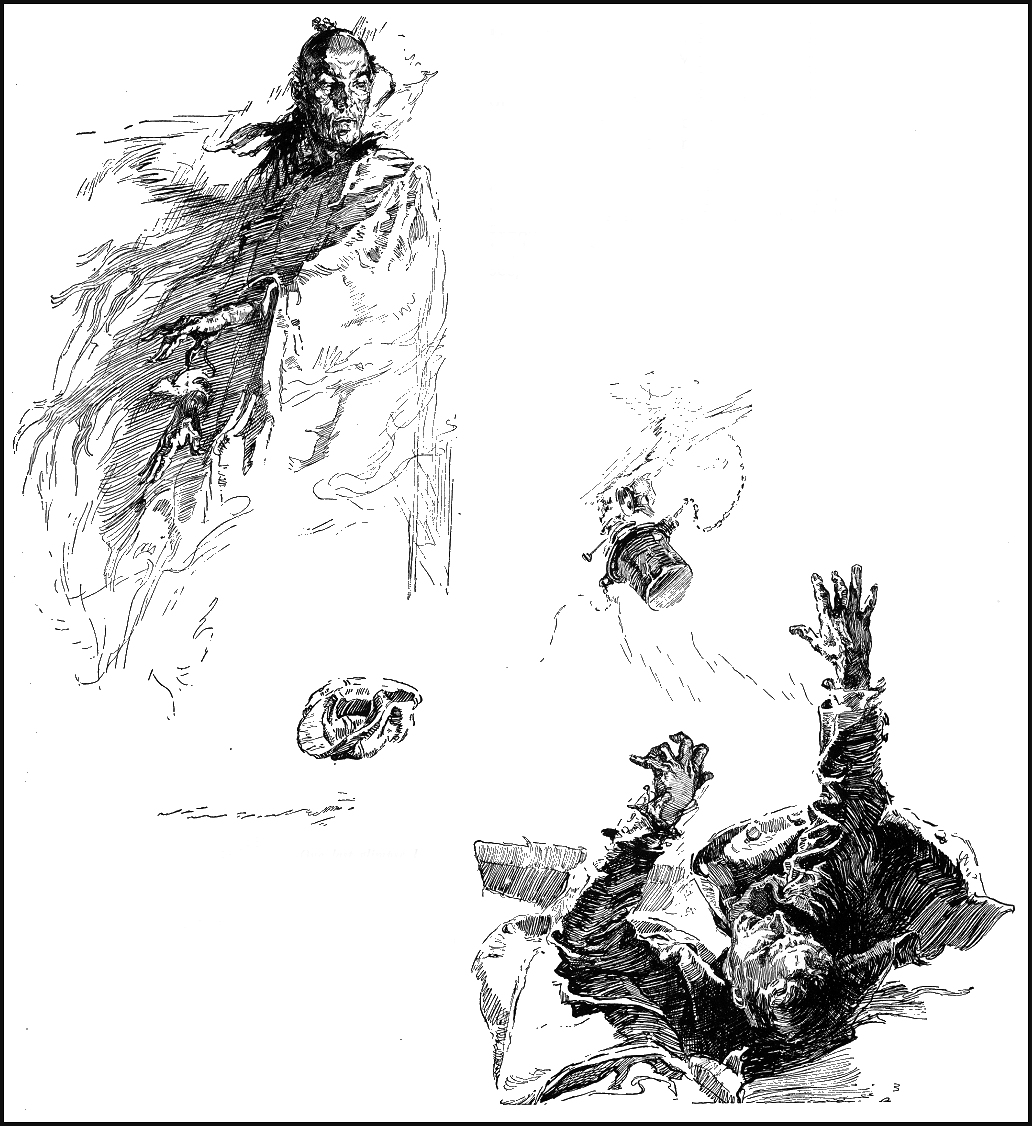
Doctor Fu Manchu, 1910s, ink on paper

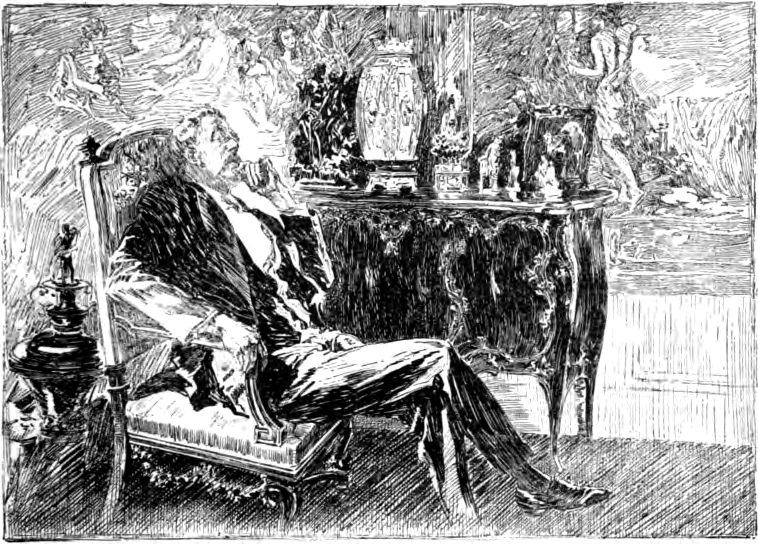
Illustration for The Story "The Tillotson Banquet", 1921, ink on paper
