= The Black Wolf (novel) =

1979 novel by Galad Elflandsson

- Dust-jacket from the first edition
- Author: Galad Elflandsson
- Illustrator: Randy Broecker
- Cover artist: Randy Broecker
- Language: English
- Genre: Horror
- Publisher: Donald M. Grant, Publisher, Inc.
- Publication date: 1979
- Publication place: United States
- Media type: Print (hardback)
- Pages: 172
- ISBN: 0-937986-05-4
- OCLC: 6531832

The Black Wolf is a horror novel by Galad Elflandsson. It was first published in hardcover by Donald M. Grant, Publisher, Inc. in 1979, in an edition of 1,020 copies. The novel was reprinted in paperback by Centaur Books in 1980.

== Plot introduction ==
The novel is a Lovecraftian story of werewolves.

== Reception ==
The book was reviewed by Richard E. Geis in Science Fiction Review, v. 9, no. 2, May 1980, Baird Searles in Isaac Asimov's Science Fiction Magazine, v. 4, no. 11, November 1980, and Wayne C. Rogers in Fantasy Mongers no. 10, Spring 1984.
