= Yellow Men Sleep =

1919 novel by Jeremy Lane

- First edition
- Author: Jeremy Lane
- Illustrator: George W. Gage
- Language: English
- Genre: Lost World
- Published: 1919 (The Century Company)
- Publication place: United States
- Pages: 343
- OCLC: 5873025

Yellow Men Sleep is a lost world novel by the American writer Jeremy Lane. It was originally serialized in the magazine All-Story Weekly beginning on May 3, 1919, and was first published in book form in 1919 by The Century Company.

== Plot ==
The novel concerns the adventures of Con Levington, a Secret Service agent, who travels to the Gobi Desert searching for the source of the drug Koresh. There he discovers an ancient civilization.

== Sources ==
- "Latest Books". The New York Times Book Review. September 7, 1919. p. 80.
- Yellow Men Sleep at Google Books
- Chalker, Jack L.; Mark Owings (1998). The Science-Fantasy Publishers: A Bibliographic History, 1923–1998. Westminster, MD, and Baltimore: Mirage Press, Ltd. p. 329.
- Salmonson, Jessica Amanda. "Lost Race Checklist". Violet Books. Archived from the original on April 11, 2008.
