= Henry Bedford-Jones =

American poet (1887–1949)

H. Bedford-Jones
- Born: April 29, 1887; Napanee, Ontario, Canada
- Died: May 6, 1949 (aged 62); Beverly Hills, California, United States
- Occupations: Short story writer, novelist
- Writing career
- Pen name: Allan Hawkwood, Charles George Souli, Cleveland B. Chase, David Seabrooke, Donald Bedford, Elliot Whitney, George Souli de Mourant, Gordon Keyne, Gordon Stuart, John Wycliffe, L. B. Williams, Lucian Pemjean, M. Lassez, Margaret Love Sangerson, Michael Gallister, Montague Brissard, Paul Ferval, Torquay Trevison, Valgard Dengir et al.
- Genres: Historical fiction Adventure, Science fiction, Fantasy

Henry James O'Brien Bedford-Jones (April 29, 1887 – May 6, 1949) was a Canadian-American historical, adventure fantasy, science fiction, crime and Western writer who became a naturalized United States citizen in 1908.

== Biography ==
Bedford-Jones was born in Napanee, Ontario, Canada in 1887. His family moved to the United States when he was a teenager and he eventually became a naturalized U.S. citizen. After being encouraged to try writing by his friend, writer William Wallace Cook, Bedford-Jones began writing dime novels and pulp magazine stories. Bedford-Jones was an enormously prolific writer; the pulp editor Harold Hersey once recalled meeting Bedford-Jones in Paris, where he was working on two novels simultaneously, each story on its own separate typewriter. Bedford-Jones cited Alexandre Dumas as his main influence, and wrote a sequel to Dumas' The Three Musketeers, D'Artagnan (1928). He wrote nearly 200 novels, 400 novelettes, and 800 short stories, earning the nickname "King of the Pulps". His works appeared in a number of pulp magazines. Bedford-Jones' main publisher was Blue Book magazine; he also appeared in Adventure, All American Fiction; All-Story Weekly, Argosy, Short Stories, Top-Notch Magazine, The Magic Carpet/Oriental Stories, Golden Fleece Historical Adventure, Ace-High Magazine, People's Story Magazine, Hutchinson's Adventure-Story Magazine, Detective Fiction Weekly, Western Story Magazine, and Weird Tales.

Bedford-Jones wrote numerous works of historical fiction dealing with several different eras, including Ancient Rome, the Viking era, seventeenth century France and Canada during the "New France" era. Bedford-Jones produced several fantasy novels revolving around Lost Worlds, including The Temple of the Ten (1921, with W. C. Robertson).

In addition to writing fiction, Bedford-Jones also worked as a journalist for the Boston Globe, and wrote poetry. Bedford-Jones was a friend of Erle Stanley Gardner, Vincent Starrett, and Lemuel de Bra.

== Works ==
partial list

- Blood Royal (People's, 1914)
- The Gate of Farewell (Argosy, 1914) John Solomon #1
- John Solomon, Supercargo (Argosy, 1914) John Solomon #2
- Solomon's Quest (People's, 1915) John Solomon #3
- Gentleman Solomon (People's, 1915) John Solomon #4
- The Seal of John Solomon (Argosy, 1915) John Solomon #5
- Solomon's Carpet (Argosy, 1915) John Solomon #6
- Solomon’s Submarine (People’s Magazine. 1916) John Solomon #7
- John Solomon, Argonaut (People’s Magazine, 1916) John Solomon #8
- The Shawl of Solomon (People's, 1917) John Solomon #9
- Pilgrim Solomon (People’s Magazine, 1917) John Solomon #10
- John Solomon, Retired (People's, 1917) John Solomon #11
- Solomon’s Son (People’s, 1918) John Solomon #12
- Sword Flame (All Story Weekly, 1918)
- The Ship of Shadows (Blue Book, February 1920)
- Arizona Argonauts (Short Stories, 1920)
- The Temple of the Ten (with W. C. Robertson, Adventure 1921, book form 1973)
- John Solomon (People's, 1921) John Solomon #13
- John Solomon, Incognito (People's, 1921) John Solomon #14
- Down the Coast of Barbary (Argosy, 1921)
- The Shadow (1922)
- Pirates' Gold (Adventures 1922)
- Splendour of the Gods (1924)
- The Star Woman (1924)
- The Cruise of the Pelican, (1924)
- The King's Passport (1925)
- D'Artagnan (Adventure, 1928)
- The Wizard of Atlas (1928)
- John Barry, New York : Creative Age Press Inc., [1947]
- The Opium Ship (2005) originally in The Thrill Book in 1919
- The House of Skulls and other Tales from the Pulps (2006)
- Blood Royal (2008)
- Pirates' Gold (2008)
- The Golden Goshawk (2009) Captain Dan Marquad series
- The Master of Dragons (2011) O'Neill and Burkett series
- The Rajah from Hell (2012)
- The Saga of Thady Shea (2013)
- Wilderness Trail (2013) originally in Blue Book in 1915
- The Sphinx Emerald (2014)
- The Devil's Bosun (2015)
- Treasure Seekers (2015)
- Gimlet-Eye Gunn (2016)
- Our Far-Flung Battle Line (2017)
- Warriors in Exile (2017)
- They Lived by the Sword (2017)
- The Beginning of Air Mail (2018)
- Ships and Men (2019)
- Young Kit Carson (2019)
- The Second Mate (2020)

Non-fiction

- This Fiction Business (1922, revised 1929)
- The Graduate Fictioneer (1932)
- Money Brawl: How to Write for Money and This Fiction Business (with Jack Woodford; introduction by Richard A. Lupoff 2012)

== Gallery ==
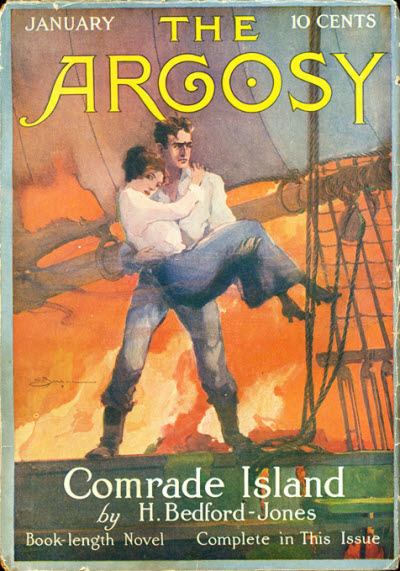
Bedford-Jones's "Comrade Island" was the cover story in the January 1916 issue of The Argosy

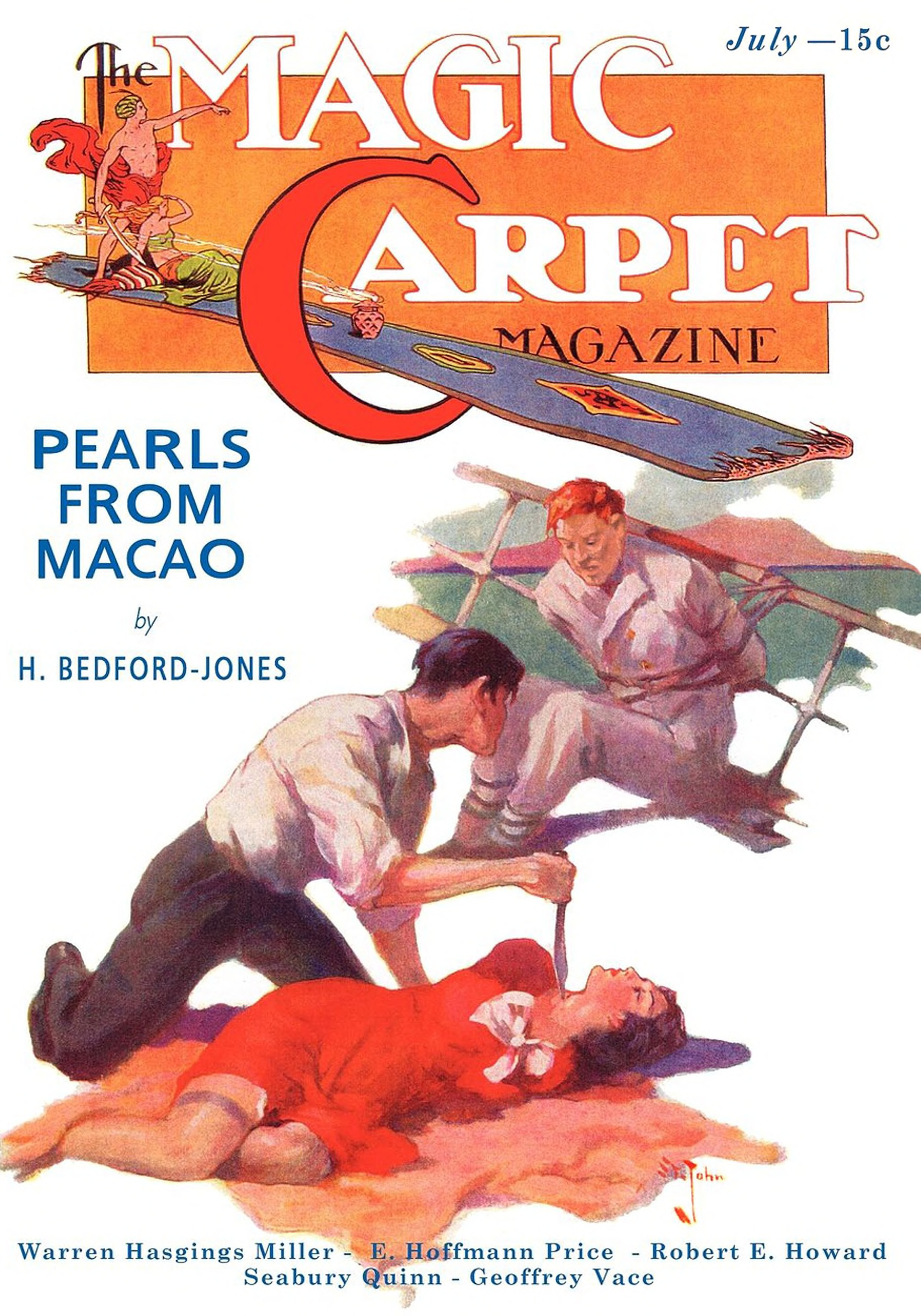
Bedford-Jones's novelette "Pearls from Macao" took the cover of the July 1933 issue of Magic Carpet

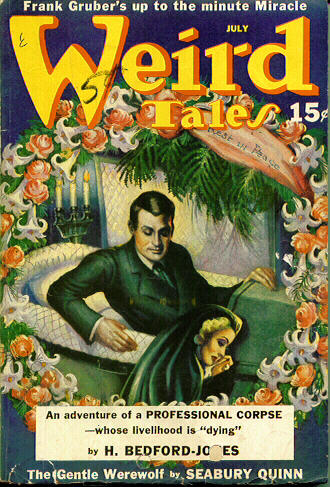
Bedford-Jones's "The Artificial Honeymoon" was the cover story in the July 1940 Weird Tales
