= Here There Be Dragons =

1992 novel by Roger Zelazny

- Cover of first edition
- Author: Roger Zelazny
- Illustrator: Vaughn Bodē
- Cover artist: Vaughn Bodē
- Language: English
- Genre: Children
- Publisher: D. M. Grant
- Publication date: 1992
- Publication place: United States
- Media type: Print
- Pages: 42
- ISBN: 1-880418-01-0

Here There Be Dragons is a children's book by American writer Roger Zelazny. It is one of only two stories that he wrote for children—the other being Way Up High—and one of just three books without heroic protagonists. The two children's books were first published with separate dust jackets but sold only in shared slipcases bearing the title Here There Be Dragons/Way Up High. One thousand copies of each book (signed by Zelazny) were produced in 1992 with illustrations by Vaughn Bodē.

Zelazny wrote Here There Be Dragons and Way Up High for his children in 1968-1969. He admired the work of underground comics artist Vaughn Bodē and commissioned him to illustrate the two books. The drawings were exhibited at the 1969 World Science Fiction Convention in St. Louis; but before the books could be published, Bodē informed Zelazny that although Zelazny owned the pictures, he did not have the reproduction rights. In his literary biography of Zelazny, Christopher S. Kovacs explains the issue: “Zelazny saw the book as two of his tales illustrated by Bodē, but Bodē viewed it as a showcase of his art illuminated by Zelazny's text." The publication of the books foundered when Zelazny and Bodē insisted on equal royalties. Bodē died in 1975, and his estate agreed to the publication of the books with Bodē's illustrations in 1992.

== Characters ==
- William — The fourth adviser to the king goes on a quest to find a medium-sized dragon with colored lights in lieu of fireworks for the king's daughter's tenth birthday party.
- The King — A foolish sovereign of a small, isolated kingdom surrounded by high, rugged mountains. He commands his four advisers to provide fireworks for his daughter's birthday party.
- Mr. Gibberling — A royal cartographer who writes "HERE THERE BE DRAGONS" in unknown territories at the edges of his maps.
- Bell/Belkis — Bell is a lizard captured by William who promises to provide a medium-sized dragon for the party. At the party, Bell transforms himself into Belkis, a large, ferocious dragon.

== Plot synopsis ==
In an isolated kingdom, people do not travel abroad because the kingdom is surrounded by high mountains and because they think there are ferocious dragons beyond the mountains. They think there are dragons because the royal cartographer, Mr. Gibberling, does not know what is beyond the mountains, so in the blank areas on the edges of his maps he writes "HERE THERE BE DRAGONS".

The king wants fireworks for his daughter's birthday party, but the fireworks maker dies without passing on his skills to another. The king consults with his four advisers. The first adviser comes up with the idea of importing a medium-sized dragon with colored lights for the party. The king thinks this is a splendid idea and after some discussion the first three advisers assign the dragon hunting job to the fourth adviser, a young man named William.

William goes on a quest to find such a dragon, but all he captures is a lizard named Bell. The lizard promises William that he will produce a medium-sized dragon with colored lights for the party. At the party, however, Bell transforms himself into a huge, menacing, fire-breathing dragon named Belkis. The dragon, it turns out, is interested in only one thing—Mr. Gibberling's practice of writing "HERE THERE BE DRAGONS" on his maps. He says that there are very few dragons, they wish to be left alone, and disguise themselves as innocuous animals such as lizards to avoid humans.

He insists that Mr. Gibberling fly on his back and make accurate maps of the lands around the kingdom and eliminate all references to dragons. Gibberling then makes excellent maps of the whole region. On one side of his maps is an enormous ocean with unknown lands beyond it. Since he does not know what is there, he writes: "HERE THERE BE SEA SERPENTS".

== Reception ==
Carolyn Cushman of Locus magazine calls Here There Be Dragons "a Thurberesque idea and [Zelazny] handles it quite well." She adds that "It's a cute story, without intrusively obvious educational elements, and with just enough truth, wonder and silliness to catch the imagination of all ages." She likes the story "for its satiric wit and appeal across ages." Darrell Schweitzer of Aboriginal Science Fiction magazine writes that Here There Be Dragons and its companion piece, Way Up High, "are charming, and worthy of widespread circulation."

== Other sources ==
- D'Ammassa, Don (2005). "Roger Zelazny". The Encyclopedia of Science Fiction. New York: Facts On File, Inc. pp. 432–434. ISBN 0-8160-5924-1.
- Grant, John, ed. (1997). "Roger Zelazny". The Encyclopedia of Fantasy. New York: St. Martin's Press. ISBN 0-312-19869-8.
- Krulik, Theodore (1986). Roger Zelazny. New York: Ungar Publishing. ISBN 0-8044-2490-X.
- Levack, Daniel J. H. (1983). Amber Dreams: A Roger Zelazny Bibliography. San Francisco: Underwood/Miller. pp. 34–35. ISBN 0-934438-39-0.
- Sanders, Joseph (1980). Roger Zelazny: A Primary and Secondary Bibliography. Boston: G. K. Hall and Co. ISBN 9780816180813.
- Stephens, Christopher P. (1991). A Checklist of Roger Zelazny. New York: Ultramarine Press. ISBN 9780893661663.
- Yoke, Carl (1979). Roger Zelazny: Starmont Reader's Guide 2. West Linn, Oregon: Starmont House. ISBN 9780916732042.
- Yoke, Carl (1979). Roger Zelazny and Andre Norton: Proponents of Individualism. Columbus, Ohio: State University of Ohio.
