= Joseph H. Crawford Jr. =

- Born: 1932 (age 93–94); Providence, Rhode Island, United States
- Occupation: bibliographer
- Writing career
- Subject: bibliography

Joseph H. Crawford Jr. (born 1932) is an American science fiction collector and bibliographer. He notably compiled 333: A Bibliography of the Science-Fantasy Novel with James J. Donahue and Donald M. Grant which was published by The Grandon Company in 1953.

== Early life and education ==
Crawford was born in Providence, Rhode Island in 1932. He graduated from La Salle Academy in 1949 and received a B. A. in Political Science from Providence College in 1953. He served in the United States Army from 1955-1957. Crawford was first attracted to science fiction through the magazine Famous Fantastic Mysteries.
