= Kenneth Fulton =

Background information
- Born: 1941
- Occupation: Sanders Alumni Professor of Choral Studies Louisiana State University

Kenneth Fulton is the Professor Emeritus of Choral Studies and former Sanders Alumni Professor of Choral Studies and Chair of the Division of Ensembles and Conducting at Louisiana State University (LSU)'s College of Music and Dramatic Arts. He was conductor of the LSU A Cappella Choir and taught choral music. Internationally recognized as a conductor and clinician, Fulton has appeared professionally in 32 different states. Dr. Fulton's choirs have given 18 invitational performances for national audiences of the American Choral Directors Association and the Music Educators National Conference, the College Music Society, the Sonneck Society, and the American Musicological Society, as well as numerous regional performances. He was also chorus master for the Baton Rouge Symphony Chorus for fifteen years and Artistic Director/Conductor for the Linz International Choral Festival in Linz, Austria, where he annually conducted performances with the Festival Orchestra and Chorus. Dr. Fulton is known as one of the most respected university choral conductors in America.
