= 333: A Bibliography of the Science-Fantasy Novel =

- Cover of the first edition (paperback)
- Author: Joseph H. Crawford, Jr., James J. Donahue and Donald M. Grant
- Cover artist: Roy Hunt (paperback)
- Language: English
- Subject: Bibliography
- Published: 1953 (The Grandon Company)
- Publication place: United States
- Media type: Print (hardback & paperback)
- Pages: 79
- OCLC: 31225106

333: A Bibliography of the Science-Fantasy Novel is a bibliography of English science fiction and fantasy books compiled and edited by Joseph H. Crawford, Jr., James J. Donahue and Donald M. Grant. It was first published by The Grandon Company in an edition of 450 paperback and 50 hardback copies. The hardback was issued without jacket. The book gives plot descriptions of 333 novels published prior to 1951.
