= Black Wolf, West Virginia =

Unincorporated community in West Virginia, United States

Black Wolf
- Unincorporated community
- Location within the state of West Virginia Black Wolf (the United States)
- Coordinates: 37°20′10″N 81°29′10″W
- Country: United States
- State: West Virginia
- County: McDowell
- Time zone: UTC-5 (Eastern (EST))
  - Summer (DST): UTC-4 (EDT)
- GNIS feature ID: 1553914

Black Wolf is an unincorporated community located in McDowell County, West Virginia, United States. Black Wolf lies along the Norfolk and Western Railroad on the Tug Fork River.
