= Henry Hardy Heins =

American historian (1923–2003)

- Born: December 7, 1923; New York City, U.S.
- Died: October 1, 2003 (aged 79); Albany, New York, U.S.
- Occupations: Lutheran minister, historian, bibliographer
- Writing career
- Subjects: history, bibliography (Edgar Rice Burroughs)

Henry Hardy Heins (December 7, 1923 – October 1, 2003) was an American Lutheran minister, historian and bibliographer. He was born in Hollis, Queens on Long Island and received degrees from Hartwick College and Gettysburg Theological Seminary. He was ordained a Lutheran minister in 1948 and served at parishes in the upstate New York towns of Central Bridge, Liberty and Albany. Heins wrote books on history and a bibliography of Edgar Rice Burroughs, after collecting and studying his works for over 30 years. He died on October 1, 2003 in Albany at the age of 79.

== Works ==
- Throughout All the Years (1946)
- Numeral Cancellations of the British Empire (1959)
- A Golden Anniversary Bibliography of Edgar Rice Burroughs (1964)
- Swan of Albany (1976)
