= The Pride of Bear Creek =

1966 collection of short stories by Robert E. Howard

- Cover of the first edition
- Author: Robert E. Howard
- Cover artist: Henry Eichner
- Language: English
- Series: Breckinridge Elkins
- Genre: Western
- Publisher: Donald M. Grant, Publisher, Inc.
- Publication date: 1966
- Publication place: United States
- Media type: Print (hardback)
- Pages: 221 pp
- OCLC: 11476359

The Pride of Bear Creek is a collection of Western short stories by Robert E. Howard. It was first published in 1966 by Donald M. Grant, Publisher, Inc. Grant also published an edition in 1977 with illustrations by Tim Kirk.

== Contents ==
- "The Riot at Cougar Paw"
- "Pilgrims to the Pecos"
- "High Horse Rampage"
- "The Apache Mountain War"
- "Pistol Polities"
- "The Conquerin' Hero of the Humbolts"
- "A Ringtailed Tornado"
