= Rick Berry (artist) =

American painter (born 1953)

- Born: Richard Riley Berry; June 2, 1953 (age 73); San Bernardino, California, U.S.
- Known for: Fine artist, illustrator
- Website: rickberrystudio.com

Rick Berry (born June 2, 1953) is an American contemporary expressionistic figure artist based in the Boston area. Berry creates art for galleries, illustration, and paintings for theatrical performances.

Berry's work has appeared in many science fiction, fantasy and comic books, including Neil Gaiman's Sandman, Magic: The Gathering cards, and Stephen King novels. In 1985, Berry created the first digitally painted book cover worldwide for William Gibson's Neuromancer. Berry has also written under the names Sam Rakeland, R.R. Berry, Rich Berry, Richard Berry, and O. Berry.

== Early life ==
Berry was born in San Bernardino, California in 1953. His father, an air force fighter pilot, was frequently stationed in China. Berry's childhood home was populated with Asian art which fascinated Berry and later found its way into his works.

Frequently moving in his youth, he left behind friends, homes and communities, but he never let go of art. Self-taught, drawing was the constant in his life. He learned from comics, book covers, and anything available from the streets. At 17 while living in Colorado, Berry left school and home, hitchhiking across the country. His art career started around that time in underground comics, as a founding member of Everyman Studios in Colorado. His first commissioned painting for the book industry was a cover for Jules Verne's 1870 novel Twenty Thousand Leagues Under the Seas, published by Simon and Schuster, 1978.

== Early Computer Art ==
Berry is credited with the first digitally painted book cover, in his cover for the cyberpunk novel Neuromancer, by William Gibson. Published in 1985, this cover was commissioned when it became clear that Neuromancer would sweep the awards after its initial publication in 1984 and remained the novel's cover for almost two decades. Berry created the painting with assistance from hackers at MIT's Machine Architectural Group.

First digitally painted book cover for Neuromancer.

Like William Gibson, Berry purchased his first computer from the proceeds of Neuromancer. He immediately began experimenting with it as a groundbreaking new creative tool, not to mimic techniques of traditional media.

Berry again worked with William Gibson and director Robert Longo for SonyPictures’ Johnny Mnemonic. The team of Rick Berry, Darrel Anderson and Gene Bodio employed state-of-the-art tech advances to design and produce the CGI cyberspace climax - the award-winning sequence featured in SIGGRAPH's animation revue, 1996. Berry was also Keanu Reeves’ cyberspace stunt double in Johnny Mnemonic.

== Collaborations in Italy ==
In 2010, Rick Berry and frequent collaborator, Phil Hale, were the subject of the museum exhibition "Parallel Evolutions" at Lucca Center for Contemporary Art, Italy. " ...two artists who are emblematic of the fluid, shifting nature of contemporary art." —Cosimo Lorenzo Pancini & Emanuele Vietina, Co-Curators. The exhibition coincided with the annual Lucca Comics and Games Festival attracting 140,000 attendees. Berry and Hale were honored guests at this festival twice, 1998 and again in 2010.

"Parallel Evolutions" concluded with a special art event—Berry and Hale collaborating before a packed audience at the museum. These paintings sold during the festival in the charity auction for the local children's hospital. A decade earlier, Berry had designed the festival’s now ongoing live collaborative performance site featuring international artists working together for the first time.

Berry was first introduced to Hale when Phil approached Berry as a teenager interested in acquiring art instruction and they continue a lifelong association. In the early 90s artist Jeffrey Catherine Jones said of Berry and Hale -"It is remarkable ... that somehow out of the "discontinuities of the unexpected universe" two of the most creative artists and best draftsmen I've ever seen should met at the right time." -- Jeff Jones commenting on Double Memory the book of art by Berry and Hale.

== Connection with Tufts University ==
Berry was commissioned to create several solo exhibitions at Tufts University for their [Institute of Global Leadership]. Examples of topics Berry explored include human trafficking, conflict resolution over limited resources, the politics of fear, and the advancing globalization of China. During 2005-06 Berry was Practitioner in Residence for Tufts INSPIRE program.

Of works created for these international symposia, Rick states “These paintings serve as meditation upon events almost too overwhelming to contemplate. Seeing with art, it becomes possible to move toward the problems considered, rather than run from them”

== Opera and theatre ==
Berry was invited to participate in the first visual art residency offered by Opera Boston, a company known for innovative repertoire choices. The two-season collaboration seemed a natural partnership as soon as it began with Shostakovich's surreal opera The Nose (opera). "Rick Berry,...was embedded in the rehearsals" (BostonMetro Feb 27, 2009) where he sketched performers in the dark. Back in the studio, Berry would put aside these small sketches and without photography or models, he relied upon his unique process of discovery in the paint and his memory, to evolve large scale works for gallery exhibitions. Berry brought this technique to live theater in his 2010 collaboration with Amanda Palmer and the American Repertory Theater.

=== Amanda Palmer and Cabaret ===
In 2010, Amanda Palmer invited Berry to engage in her upcoming production of Cabaret at the American Repertory Theater in Cambridge, Massachusetts. Once again, he employed his process of rapid ink drawing while embedded in rehearsals, later producing large expressive oil paintings as a part of the café theater set. Influenced by the intensity of the story, performers, and Butoh movement in this production, Berry created works that were "like images of ghosts projected on smoke and ash. Just at the moment you think you've resolved them, they shimmer and erode before your eyes." Berry was awarded the Silver Medal from the Society of Illustrators for his painting "To Absent Friends" in this series.

Berry's next collaboration with Amanda Palmer was as one of several artists selected to paint images influenced by her new songs. Two Berry paintings are included in her 2012–13 world tour gallery and art book.

== Selected solo and group exhibitions ==
- Wondervisions 2026 - Group exhibition of Everyman Studios founders in Tahlequah, Oklahoma, March 2026
- Amanda Palmer and the Grand Theft Orchestra - International year-long record tour with pop up art exhibits, 2013
- Tome II:Melancholia - Last Rites Gallery, NY October 2013
- Back to Back - Sloane Merrill Gallery, Boston, April 2013
- Rick Berry; Sloane Merrill Gallery Boston October 2013
- Rick Berry;Seeing In The Dark- Gallery 360, Northeastern University, Boston, MA January–March 2011
- It Figures;Rick Berry and Damon Lehrer- The William Scott Gallery Boston, MA Sept 2011*Sur-Realism Arcadia Gallery, New York, NY July 2012
- Shapeshifters:Art of Rick Berry and Venessa Lemen- Encinitas Library Gallery, Encinitas CA July 2012
- Endless Reflections: 20 Years of Neil Gaiman’s Sandman. - GalleryNucleus, Alhambra, CA
- Oil and Water: Rick Berry- Tufts Institute for Global Leadership, Hall of Flags, Fletcher School of Government, Tufts University, Medford, MA, February 2005
- Have and Have Nots- Varnish Fine Art Gallery San Francisco CA April 2012
- Plenty - 13 Forest Gallery Arlington MA Nov 2011
- National Figures- The William Scott Gallery Boston MA October 2011
- Seeing in the Dark: Pattern Recognition- Sharon Arts Exhibition Gallery, Peterborough, NH, August 2009
- Designer Beings: The Anatomy of Presence- Newton Free Library, Newton, MA October 2007
- Globalization and China: Challenging Cultural Boundaries- Tufts Institute for Global Leadership, February 2001,
- Global Crime, Corruption and Accountability- Tufts Institute for Global Leadership, Tufts University, Medford, MA February 1998

== Selected awards ==
Berry won the silver medal in 2010 from the Society of Illustrators for his paintings from the set of Amanda Palmer's Cabaret. He was also selected by Arthur Dion of Gallery NAGA Boston in 2009 for Juror's Choice Award at Cambridge Art Association, Point of View exhibit.

Berry has been twice nominated for the World Fantasy Award, in 1994 and 1998. He was nominated for the Chesley Awards five times, and won twice, in 2000 for "Artemis" and in 2005 (sharing the award with two other artists) for the cover art for Judith Tarr's novel Queen of the Amazons. He won a gold medal from Spectrum: The Best in Contemporary Fantastic Art in 1997 for his work "Wintermute", and has won a silver medal from Spectrum three times. He won the Gold Plate from Lucca Comics & Games Festival in 1998 and an International Horror Guild Award in 2005.

== Books ==
- Double Memory: Art and Collaborations of Rick Berry and Phil Hale, Grant Books, 1993

"... There are echoes of Francis Bacon's horrific portraits in the distorted figure studies shown, and echoes of Max Ernst and Rene Magritte in the dark fantasies... Yet ultimately Berry and Hale's dark, frightening vision is singularly their own... compelling." -Publishers Weekly 1993

- Sparrow, Volume 6: Rick Berry, IDW Publishing, 2008
