= Jeremy Lane (writer) =

American novelist

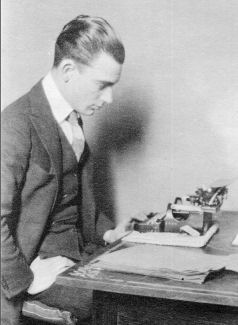
- Born: Herman Dale Schuchert; April 29, 1893; Mishawaka, Indiana, U.S.
- Died: September 18, 1963 (aged 70); Warren, Michigan, U.S.
- Occupations: Author; journalist; salesman; musician
- Writing career
- Genres: Mystery, Lost World

Jeremy Lane (April 29, 1893 - September 18, 1963) was an American writer of mystery and lost world short stories and novels. His stories appeared in pulp magazines including The All-Story Weekly, Top-Notch Magazine, The Smart Set and People's Favorite Magazine. His books, usually starring his detective hero Whitney Wheat, included Death To Drumbeat, Murder Menageries, Murder Spoils Everything, Kill Him Tonight, The Left Hand of God and Murder Has Bright Eyes. His novel, Yellow Men Sleep, was published by The Century Company in 1919.

Born Herman Dale Schuchert in Mishawaka, Indiana, on April 29, 1893, he took the pen name Jeremy Lane (and later legally changed his name to that) to avoid post-World War I anti-German backlash as he was beginning his musical and literary careers.

As "Jerry" Lane he also led a small dance band known as The Symphonic Step Stimulators which toured the Midwest from the early 1920s into the 1940s. In the 1950s and 1960s he was a reporter and feature writer for a local newspaper in New York State's Mohawk Valley region. He also worked in sales for newspaper advertising.

With his wife Betty (née Bessie May Ross 1890–1945), he was part of the so-called "group" who studied in Chicago with Georges Gurdjieff, an Armenian Russian (1877–1949) who combined ideas from Eastern mysticism and religions with his own ideas about living a full and productive life. Lane died on September 18, 1963, at the age of 70, while visiting relatives in Birmingham, Michigan.

His daughter Liela (1920–2014), known professionally as Lee Murray, was a popular radio/TV/cable personality in the Detroit, Michigan area from the mid-1960s through the 1980s.
