= Ned Dameron =

Science fiction and fantasy artist

Ned Dameron is a science fiction and fantasy artist.

== Influences ==
His mother had a gallery in New Orleans, where she mainly dealt with contemporary European paintings originating from a fantastic school, which decisively influenced him to turn in that direction in art.

== Works ==
Ned Dameron produced cover artwork for many genre novels including The Dark Tower series by Stephen King, and The Second Generation by Margaret Weis and Tracy Hickman. He also produced interior illustrations for many Dungeons & Dragons books and Dragon magazine from 1989 to 1999, as well as cover art for the Dark Sun books Thri-Kreen of Athas and Beyond the Prism Pentad. His interior art has been featured in Wizards and Rogues of the Realms (1995). He provided interior art for The Coelura, an illustrated novella by Anne McCaffrey (1987).
