= 1973 in literature =

This article contains information about the literary events and publications of 1973.

== Events ==
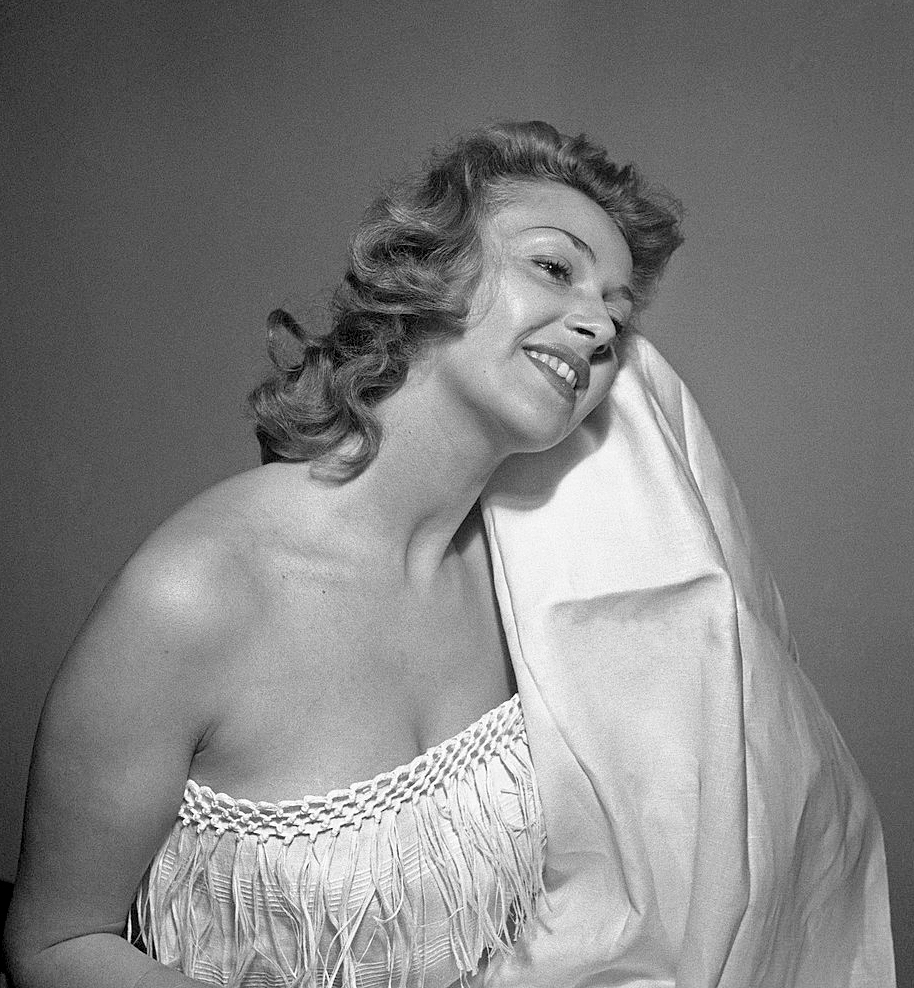
Franca Rame in 1952

- March 6 – The Montenegrin Academy of Sciences and Arts, founded as the Montenegrin Society for Science and Arts (Crnogorsko društvo za nauku i umjetnost) in Podgorica, elects its first members.
- March – 5 Italian fascists, who were reportedly commissioned by high-ranking officials in Milan's Carabinieri (Italian gendarmerie), abduct the feminist playwright Franca Rame (wife of Dario Fo). They raped Rame, beat her, burnt her with cigarettes, slashed her with razor blades and left her in a park.
- May 14
  - New orthography for the Greenlandic language is introduced.
  - François Truffaut's film Day for Night (La Nuit américaine) premieres; novelist Graham Greene (credited as Henry Graham) has a cameo role as an English insurance company representative.
- June 21
  - The Supreme Court of the United States delivers its decision in the landmark case Miller v. California, establishing the "Miller test" for determining obscenity.
  - Virago Press, registered on June 18 in the U.K. by Carmen Callil mainly to publish classics by women writers, holds its first board meeting; its first book will be published in 1975.
- July 26 – Peter Shaffer's drama Equus is premièred in London by the National Theatre company at The Old Vic.
- September – Following the overthrow of President Allende by a military regime, book burnings take place in Chile.
- September 16 – Chilean poet and playwright Víctor Jara, detained four days earlier as a political prisoner in Estadio Chile and tortured during the 1973 Chilean coup d'état, is shot and killed. His last poem, "Estadio Chile", is preserved in memories and scraps of paper retained by fellow detainees.
- September 25 – The funeral of Chilean poet Pablo Neruda becomes a focus for protests against the new government of Augusto Pinochet.
- December 3 – French police of the Direction de la surveillance du territoire, disguised as plumbers, are caught trying to install a spy microphone in the directors' office of the Paris satirical paper Le Canard enchaîné.
- c. December 27 – Aleksandr Solzhenitsyn's novel The Gulag Archipelago (Архипелаг ГУЛАГ, written 1958–1968) is first published, by the Paris publisher Éditions du Seuil from a typescript smuggled out of the Soviet Union.
- unknown dates
  - André Brink's novel Kennis van die aand ("Looking on Darkness") becomes the first Afrikaans book banned by the government of South Africa.
  - Mikhail Bulgakov's novel The Master and Margarita (Ма́стер и Маргари́та) is first published complete in Moscow (in the form left at the author's death in 1940), by Khudozhestvennaya Literatura.
  - Frank Herbert becomes director-photographer of the television show, The Tillers.
  - Robert B. Parker starts the Boston-based Spenser book series with his debut crime novel The Godwulf Manuscript.

== New books ==
=== Fiction ===
- Nelson Algren – The Last Carousel (short stories)
- Martin Amis – The Rachel Papers
- J. G. Ballard – Crash
- René Barjavel – The Immortals
- Donald Barr - Space Relations
- Erhan Bener - Böcek
- Thomas Berger – Regiment of Women
- Joseph Payne Brennan – Stories of Darkness and Dread
- Rita Mae Brown – Rubyfruit Jungle
- John Brunner – The Stone That Never Came Down
- Ramsey Campbell – Demons by Daylight
- Jerome Charyn – The Tar Baby
- Agatha Christie – Postern of Fate
- Arthur C. Clarke – Rendezvous with Rama
- Basil Copper – From Evil's Pillow
- Julio Cortázar – Libro de Manuel (A Manual for Manuel)
- L. Sprague de Camp – The Fallible Fiend
- L. Sprague de Camp and Catherine Crook de Camp, editors – Tales Beyond Time
- Michel Déon – Un Taxi mauve
- August Derleth – The Chronicles of Solar Pons
- Michael Ende – Momo
- Paul E. Erdman – The Billion Dollar Sure Thing
- J. G. Farrell – The Siege of Krishnapur
- Leon Forrest – There Is A Tree More Ancient Than Eden
- William Goldman – The Princess Bride ("S. Morgenstern's Classic Tale of True Love and High Adventure, The "Good Parts" Version")
- Graham Greene – The Honorary Consul
- Elisabeth Harvor – Women and Children (11 stories revised as Our Lady of All Distances in 1991)
- L.P. Hartley – The Will and the Way
- Robert A. Heinlein – Time Enough for Love
- Witi Ihimaera – Tangi
- Hammond Innes – Golden Soak
- Joseph Joffo – A Bag of Marbles (Un sac de billes)
- B. S. Johnson – Christie Malry's Own Double-Entry
- James Jones – A Touch of Danger
- Anna Kavan – Who Are You?
- Brian Killick – The Heralds
- Dean R. Koontz – Demon Seed
- Jerzy Kosiński – The Devil Tree
- Milan Kundera – Life Is Elsewhere (Život je jinde, first published in French as La Vie est ailleurs)
- Derek Lambert
  - Beau Blackstone
  - Blackstone's Fancy
- Clarice Lispector – Água Viva
- Robert Ludlum – The Matlock Paper
- John D. MacDonald – The Turquoise Lament
- Cormac McCarthy – Child of God
- Robert Marasco – Burnt Offerings
- Toni Morrison – Sula
- Iris Murdoch – The Black Prince
- Robert B. Parker – The Godwulf Manuscript
- Mervyn Peake (died 1968) – The Rhyme of the Flying Bomb
- Anthony Powell – Temporary Kings
- Thomas Pynchon – Gravity's Rainbow
- Ernst von Salomon – Der tote Preuße
- Irwin Shaw – Evening in Byzantium
- Aleksandr Solzhenitsyn – The Gulag Archipelago (Архипелаг ГУЛАГ)
- Richard G. Stern – Other Men's Daughters
- Rex Stout – Please Pass the Guilt
- Jacqueline Susann – Once Is Not Enough
- Julian Symons – The Plot Against Roger Rider
- Hunter S. Thompson – Fear and Loathing on the Campaign Trail '72
- Jack Vance – The Anome
- Mario Vargas Llosa – Captain Pantoja and the Special Service (Pantaleón y las visitadoras)
- Gore Vidal – Burr
- Kurt Vonnegut, Jr. – Breakfast of Champions
- Patrick White – The Eye of the Storm
- Rudy Wiebe – Temptations of Big Bear
- Venedikt Yerofeyev – Moscow-Petushki (Moscow to the end of the line; first commercial publication, in Israel)
- Roger Zelazny
  - To Die in Italbar
  - Today We Choose Faces

=== Children and young people ===
- Nina Bawden – Carrie's War
- Thea Beckman – Crusade in Jeans (Kruistocht in spijkerbroek)
- Lois Duncan – I Know What You Did Last Summer
- Penelope Lively – The Ghost of Thomas Kempe
- Ruth Manning-Sanders – A Book of Ogres and Trolls
- Ruth Park – The Muddle-Headed Wombat and the Bush Band
- Bill Peet – The Spooky Tail of Prewitt Peacock
- Dick Roughsey – The Giant Devil Dingo
- Doris Buchanan Smith – A Taste of Blackberries
- Patricia Wrightson – The Nargun and the Stars

=== Drama ===
- Alan Ayckbourn – The Norman Conquests
- Dario Fo
  - Guerra di popolo in Cile (The People's War in Chile - published version includes monologue Mamma Togni)
  - Pum, pum, chi è? La Polizia! (Knock, knock, who's there? The police!)
- Griselda Gambaro – Information For Foreigners (Información para extranjeros)
- Jean Poiret – La Cage aux Folles
- David Rudkin – Cries from Casement as His Bones are Brought to Dublin (radio play)
- Peter Shaffer – Equus
- Wole Soyinka – The Bacchae of Euripides

=== Poetry ===
- Allen Curnow – An Abominable Temper and Other Poems
- Tomás Rivera – Always and other poems

=== Non-fiction ===
- Ernest Becker – The Denial of Death
- Howard W. Bergerson – Palindromes and Anagrams
- Allan W. Eckert – The Court-Martial of Daniel Boone
- Antonia Fraser – Cromwell, Our Chief of Men
- Nancy Friday – My Secret Garden
- Pauline Kael – Deeper into Movies (1974 National Book Award winner for Arts and Letters)
- Christopher Lloyd – Foliage Plants
- Peter Maas – Serpico
- New York Bible Society International – New Testament, New International Version (translated into modern American English)
- Nigel Nicolson – Portrait of a Marriage (compiled from writings of his mother, Vita Sackville-West, died 1962)
- Tim O'Brien – If I Die in a Combat Zone, Box Me Up and Ship Me Home
- Bill Owens – Suburbia
- John Pearson – James Bond: The Authorised Biography of 007
- Flora Rheta Schreiber – Sybil
- E. F. Schumacher – Small Is Beautiful
- Maureen and Tony Wheeler – Across Asia on the Cheap
- Paula Wolfert – Couscous and Other Good Food from Morocco

== Births ==
- January 1 – Bryan Thao Worra, Lao writer
- January 8 – Madhulika Liddle, Indian writer
- January 13 – Lois Pryce, Scottish-born travel writer and journalist
- February 10 – Núria Añó, Catalan writer
- February 21
  - Jacob M. Appel, American short story writer and bioethicist
  - Mariana Savka, Ukrainian poet, children's writer, translator and publisher
- March 3 – Abbas Khadir, German author and poet of Iraqi origin
- April 15 – Maria V. Snyder, American fantasy and science-fiction writer
- May 10 – Tana French, American-born mystery novelist and actress
- May 20 – Natalka Sniadanko, Ukrainian writer, journalist and translator
- June 2 – David Bezmozgis, Latvian-Canadian writer
- June 16 – Veronica Rossi, Brazilian-American young adult novelist
- August 13 – Kamila Shamsie, Pakistan-born novelist
- August 18 – Victoria Coren Mitchell, English writer, presenter and poker player, daughter of Alan Coren
- November 12 - Jay Kristoff, Australian fantasy and science-fiction author
- November 17 – Marianna Kiyanovska, Ukrainian poet, translator and literary scholar
- December 20 – Maarja Kangro, Estonian author and poet
- December 24 – Stephenie Meyer, American young-adult vampire romance writer and film producer
- unknown dates
  - Frances Hardinge, English young people's fiction writer
  - Ahmed Saadawi, Iraqi writer
  - Juan Gabriel Vásquez, Colombian novelist

== Deaths ==
- January 15 – Neil M. Gunn, Scottish novelist, dramatist and critic (born 1891)
- February 22
  - Elizabeth Bowen, Anglo-Irish novelist and short story writer (born 1899)
  - Brigitte Reimann, East German novelist (cancer) (born 1933)
- March 5 - Robert C. O'Brien, American novelist (born 1918)
- March 6 – Pearl S. Buck, American novelist (born 1892)
- March 18 – Roland Dorgelès, French novelist and memoirist (born 1885)
- March 26 – Sir Noël Coward, English dramatist and humorist (born 1899)
- April 9 – Warren Lewis, Irish author (born 1895)
- April 20 – Elisabeth Hauptmann, German writer (born 1897)
- April 28
  - Jacques Maritain, French philosopher (born 1882)
  - Yuan Changying, Chinese writer (born 1894)
- April 30
  - Jirō Osaragi (大佛 次郎, Haruhiku Nojiri), Japanese novelist (born 1897)
  - Václav Renč, Czech poet, dramatist and translator (born 1911)
- May 21 – Carlo Emilio Gadda, Italian poet and linguist (born 1893)
- June 4 – Arna Bontemps, American poet (born 1902)
- June 9 – John Creasey, English crime writer (born 1908)
- June 10 – William Inge, American playwright (born 1913)
- June 30 – Nancy Mitford, English novelist and biographer (born 1904)
- July 11 – Nobuko Yoshiya (吉屋 信子, Yoshiya Nobuko), Japanese romantic novelist (born 1896)
- July 29 – Henri Charrière, French writer and criminal (born 1906)
- August 1 – Ann Quin, English novelist (born 1936)
- September 2 – J. R. R. Tolkien, English fantasy writer and scholar (born 1892)
- September 9 – S. N. Behrman, American playwright, screenwriter and biographer (born 1893)
- September 13 – Sajjad Zaheer, Urdu writer and revolutionary (born 1899)
- September 20 – William Plomer, South African-born British novelist, poet and literary editor (born 1903)
- September 23 – Pablo Neruda, Chilean poet (born 1904)
- September 29 – W. H. Auden, English-born poet (born 1907)
- October 6 – Margaret Wilson, American novelist (born 1882)
- October 28 – Sergio Tofano, Italian dramatist (born 1886)
- November 8 – Faruk Nafiz Çamlıbel, Turkish poet, author and playwright (born 1898)
- November 13 – B. S. Johnson, English novelist (suicide) (born 1933)
- December 7 – Benn Levy, English playwright and politician (born 1900)
- December 9 – Anthony Gilbert, English crime writer (born 1899)
- December 11 – May Wedderburn Cannan, English poet (born 1893)
- December 14 – Josef Magnus Wehner, German poet and playwright (born 1891)
- unknown date – Kathleen Lindsay, English-born South African romance novelist (born 1903)

== Awards ==
- Nobel Prize in Literature: Patrick White

=== Canada ===
- See 1973 Governor General's Awards for a complete list of winners and finalists for those awards.

=== France ===
- Prix Goncourt: Jacques Chessex, L'Ogre
- Prix Médicis:
  - French: Tony Duvert, Paysage de fantaisie
  - International: Milan Kundera, Life Is Elsewhere

=== United Kingdom ===
- Booker Prize: J. G. Farrell, The Siege of Krishnapur
- Carnegie Medal for children's literature: Penelope Lively, The Ghost of Thomas Kempe
- Cholmondeley Award: Patric Dickinson, Philip Larkin
- Eric Gregory Award: John Beynon, Ian Caws, James Fenton, Keith Harris, David Howarth, Philip Pacey
- James Tait Black Memorial Prize:
  - Fiction: Iris Murdoch, The Black Prince
  - Biography: Robin Lane Fox, Alexander the Great
- Queen's Gold Medal for Poetry: John Heath-Stubbs

=== United States ===
- American Academy of Arts and Letters Gold Medal in Poetry, John Crowe Ransom
- Hugo Award:
  - Best Novella: Ursula K. Le Guin,The Word for World Is Forest
  - Best Novel: Isaac Asimov, The Gods Themselves
- Nebula Award: Arthur C. Clarke, Rendezvous with Rama
- Newbery Medal for children's literature: Jean Craighead George, Julie of the Wolves
- Pulitzer Prize:
  - Drama: Jason Miller, That Championship Season
  - Fiction: Eudora Welty, The Optimist's Daughter
  - Poetry: Maxine Kumin, Up Country

=== Elsewhere ===
- Friedenspreis des Deutschen Buchhandels: Club of Rome
- Miles Franklin Award: No award presented
- Premio Nadal: José García Blázquez, El rito
- Viareggio Prize: Achille Campanile, Manuale di conversazione

== Sources ==
- Mitchell, Tony (1999), Dario Fo: People's Court Jester (Updated and Expanded), London: Methuen, ISBN 0-413-73320-3.
