= 1964 in poetry =

Nationality words link to articles with information on the nation's poetry or literature (for instance, Irish or France).

== Events ==
- March 23 – A surprise best-seller in the United Kingdom is John Lennon's In His Own Write, a compendium of nonsense writing, sketches and drawings by one of the Beatles, published today.
- March 29 (Easter Day) – Adrian Mitchell reads "To Whom It May Concern" to Campaign for Nuclear Disarmament protesters in Trafalgar Square, London.
- April 23 – The "Shakespeare Quartercentenary", the 400th anniversary of the birth of William Shakespeare falling around this date, is celebrated throughout the year in lecture series, exhibitions, dramatic and musical programs and other events as well as special publications (Shakespeare issues and supplements), reprinting of standard works on the playwright and poet, and the issue of commemorative postage stamps. The American Association of Advertising Agencies suggests that Shakespeare quotations should be used in advertisements. Celebrations of various kinds occur in the United Kingdom, the United States, France, Germany, Switzerland, Sweden, Denmark, Finland and elsewhere. The Shakespeare Birthplace Trust opens the Shakespeare Centre, housing its library and research facilities, in Stratford-upon-Avon (England).
- June
  - The 75th birthday of Anna Akhmatova, who was severely persecuted during the Stalin era, is celebrated around this time with special observances and the publication of new collections of her verse.
  - After the murder of American civil rights activist Andrew Goodman, poet Mary Doyle Curran finds and publishes a poem he had written for her college class, "A Corollary to a Poem by A. E. Housman."
- December – Poetry Australia literary magazine founded.
- John Berryman's 77 Dream Songs, published this year, wins the 1965 Pulitzer Prize in Poetry.
- Russian poet Joseph Brodsky is convicted of "parasitism" in a Soviet court, which sends him into exile near the Arctic Circle.
- Among the many books of poetry published this year, Robert Lowell's For the Union Dead is greeted with particular acclaim. The book is received with "general jubilation" from critics, according to Raymond Walters Jr., associate editor of the New York Times Book Review. "These verses [...] convinced many observers that its author was now the pre-eminent U.S. poet."
- The publication in the United Kingdom of The Complete Poems of D. H. Lawrence in two volumes is "a major publishing event of 1964".

== Works published in English ==
Listed by nation where the work was first published and again by the poet's native land, if different; substantially revised works listed separately:

=== Australia ===
- Geoffrey Dutton, The Literature of Australia
- Gwen Harwood, Poems, Australian poet published in the United Kingdom
- T. Inglis Moore, From the Ballads to Brennan (edited, Poetry in Australia volume 1)
- Oodgeroo Noonuccal (Kath Walker), We Are Going : Poems, first book of verse by an Aboriginal Australian
- David Rowbotham, All the Room, Australian poetry prize winner
- Douglas Stewart, Modern Australian Verse (edited, Poetry in Australia volume 2)
- R. Ward, Penguin Book of Australian Ballads, anthology
- Judith Wright, Five Senses selected poems; Australian poet published in the United Kingdom

=== Canada ===
- Earle Birney:
  - Near False Creek Mouth. Toronto: McClelland and Stewart.
  - Two Poems. Halifax.
- George Bowering, Points on the Grid
- Leonard Cohen, Flowers for Hitler, including "The Only Tourist in Havana Turns his Thoughts Homeward"
- John Robert Colombo, Poesie / Poetry 64
- Pierre Coupey, Bring Forth the Cowards
- Phyllis Gotlieb, Within the Zodiac, her first work
- John Glassco, A Point of Sky
- Irving Layton, The Laughing Rooster
- Dorothy Livesay, The Colour of God's Face.
- Gwendolyn MacEwen, The Rising Fire
- Eli Mandel, Black and Secret Man
- F. R. Scott, Events and Signals. Toronto: Ryerson Press.
- Raymond Souster, The Colour of the Times, 250 poems collected from a dozen of his previous volumes. Governor General's Award 1964.
- David Wevill, Birth of a Shark, a first collection; Canadian poet published in the United Kingdom

==== Anthologies in Canada ====
- Poetry of Mid-Century 1940/1960, edited by Milton Wilson, included the work of 10 well-known Canadian poets:

- Margaret Avison
- Earle Birney
- Leonard Cohen
- Irving Layton
- Jay Macpherson
- Kenneth McRobbie
- Alden Nowlan
- P. K. Page
- James Reaney
- Raymond Souster

- Poésie/Poetry 64, edited by John Robert Colombo and Jacques Godbout;an anthology of lesser-known poets, including:

- Margaret Atwood
- George Bowering
- Frank Davey
- K. V. Hertz
- Harry Howith
- Lionel Kearns
- John Newlove
- Gwendolyn MacEwen
- Henry Moskovitch
- Myra von Riedemann

==== Criticism, scholarship and biography in Canada ====
- Northrop Frye, Fables of Identity, 16 essays on "various works and authors in the central tradition of English mythopoeic poetry"
- Roy Daniells, Milton, Mannerism and Baroque

=== India, in English ===
- Monika Varma, Dragonflies Draw Flame ( Poetry in English ), Calcutta: Writers Workshop, India.
- Lawrence Bantleman, Man's Fall and Woman's Fall out (according to another source the last word in the title is "Fallout"), Calcutta: Writers Workshop, India.
- M. R. Bhagavan, Poems ( Poetry in English ), Calcutta: Writers Workshop, India.
- Mohinder Monga, Through the Night, Raptly ( Poetry in English ), Calcutta: Writers Workshop, India.
- Leslie de Noronha, Poems ( Poetry in English ), Calcutta: Writers Workshop, India.
- G. V. Subbaramayya, Lover's Fulfilment and Other Poems, Tenali: Rishi Publications
- Viresh Chander Dutt, The Voice of Ancient India, Calcutta: Kalyan Chander Dutt
- A. K. Ramanujan, translator, Fifteen Tamil Love Poems, translated from the original Tamil; Calcutta: Writers Workshop, Indiap

=== New Zealand ===
- Fleur Adcock, Eye of the Hurricane, Wellington: Reed (New Zealand poet who moved to England in 1963)
- Charles Brasch: Ambulando: Poems, Christchurch: Caxton Press
- Alistair Campbell, Wild Honey, London: Oxford University Press

=== United Kingdom ===
- Samuel Beckett, translator from the original French, "Comment C'est" 1961, How It Is, Irish poet published in the United Kingdom
- Sir John Betjeman, Ring of Bells
- Thomas Blackburn, A Breathing Space
- Donald Davie, Events and Wisdoms, London: Routledge and Kegan Paul (Middletown, Connecticut: Wesleyan University Press, 1965)
- Patric Dickinson, This Cold Universe
- Keith Douglas, Selected Poems (posthumous), edited by Ted Hughes
- Lawrence Durrell, Selected Poems: 1953–1963, edited by Alan Ross
- Gavin Ewart, Londoners
- Ian Hamilton Finlay, Telegrams from My Windmill, Edinburgh: Wild Hawthorn Press
- Zulfikar Ghose, The Loss of India by a Pakistani, published in the United Kingdom
- Robert Graves, Man Does, Woman Is
- Ian Hamilton, Pretending Not to Sleep
- Tony Harrison, Earthworks
- Gwen Harwood, Poems, Australian poet published in the United Kingdom
- Philip Hobsbaum, The Place's Fault
- Elizabeth Jennings, Recoveries
- Patrick Kavanagh, Collected Poems, London: MacGibbon and Kee
- Philip Larkin, The Whitsun Weddings, London: Faber and Faber
- D. H. Lawrence, The Complete Poems in two volumes (posthumous), edited by Vivian de Sola Pinto and F. Warren Roberts, with poems in chronological order and an introduction by Pinto.
- John Lennon, In His Own Write, containing nonsensical poems, sketches and drawings; a best seller by the member of the Beatles
- C. S. Lewis, Poems
- Douglas Livingstone, Sjambok by a Rhodesian poet
- Edward Lucie-Smith, Confessions and Histories
- John Masefield, Old Raiger, and Other Verse
- Adrian Mitchell, Poems
- Peter Porter, Poems Ancient & Modern, Lowestoft, Suffolk: Scorpion Press
- Peter Redgrove, At the White Monument
- Nathaniel Tarn, Old Savage/Young City
- R.S. Thomas:
  - The Bread of Truth
  - "Words and the Poet" (lecture)
- David Wevill, Birth of a Shark, a first collection; Canadian poet published in the United Kingdom
- Judith Wright, Five Senses selected poems; Australian poet published in the United Kingdom

==== Criticism, scholarship, and biography in the United Kingdom ====
- Poetry of the Thirties, a Penguin Books anthology; including the last published appearance during the lifetime of W. H. Auden of his, "September 1, 1939", a poem which he was famous for, but which he hated; the poem appeared in the edition with a note about this and four other early poems: "Mr. W. H. Auden considers these five poems to be trash which he is ashamed to have written."
- G. Hartmann, Wordsworth's Poetry, 1787-1814

=== United States ===
- Conrad Aiken, A Seizure of Limericks
- A. R. Ammons, Expressions of Sea Level
- Ted Berrigan, The Sonnets Holt, Rinehart & Winston
- Wendell Berry, The Broken Ground
- John Berryman, 77 Dream Songs, New York: Farrar, Straus & Giroux
- Joseph Payne Brennan, Nightmare Need
- John Ciardi, Person to Person
- Peter Davison, The Breaking of the Day
- James Dickey:
  - Helmets
  - Two Poems of the Air
- Ed Dorn:
  - Hands Up!, Totem Press
  - From Gloucester Out, Matrix Press
- Horace Gregory, Collected Poems
- Donald Hall, A Roof of Tiger Lilies, New York: Viking
- Robert Duncan, Roots and Branches
- Richard Eberhart, The Qyuarry
- Jean Garrigue, Country Without Maps
- Donald Hall, A Roof of Tiger Lilies
- LeRoi Jones, The Dead Lecturer, New York: Grove Press
- Galway Kinnell, Flower Herding on Mount Monadnock, Boston: Houghton Mifflin
- Denise Levertov, O Taste and See, New York: New Directions
- Robert Lowell, For the Union Dead New York: Farrar, Straus and Giroux (for more information, see "Events" section, above)
- William Meredith, The Wreck of the Thresher and Other Poems
- Vladimir Nabokov, translator, Eugene Onegin by Aleksandr Pushkin
- Frank O'Hara, Lunch Poems
- Elder Olson, Collected Poems
- Ezra Pound, editor, Confucius to Cummings: An Anthology of Poetry
- Kenneth Rexroth:
  - Natural Numbers
  - (translator), 100 Poems from the Japanese
- Theodore Roethke (died 1963):
  - The Far Field, Garden City, New York: Doubleday
  - Sequence, Sometimes Metaphysical
- M. L. Rosenthal, Blue Boy on Skates
- E. N. Sargent, The African Boy
- Anne Sexton, Selected Poems
- Karl Shapiro, The Bourgeois Poet, New York: Random House
- Jack Spicer, Language
- Mark Strand, Sleeping With One Eye Open
- Robert Sward, Kissing the Dancer and Other Poems
- Mark Van Doren, Collected and New Poems
- Donald Wandrei, Poems for Midnight

==== Criticism, scholarship, and biography in the United States ====
- Phyllis Grosskurth, John Addington Symonds: A Biography (Canadian scholar publishing in the United States), winner of the 1964 Governor General's Awards in Canada
- Hugh Kenner, editor, Seventeenth Century Poetry: The Schools of Donne & Jonson, Canadian writing and published in the United States
- Vladimir Nabokov, Notes on Prosody, Russian native writing and published in the United States

=== Other in English ===
- Kofi Awoonor, Rediscovery and Other Poems, Ghanaian poet published in Ghana
- Samuel Beckett, translator from the original French, Comment C'est 1961, How It Is, Irish poet published in the United Kingdom
- Denis Devlin, Collected Poems, including "Renewal by Her Element" (see also Collected Poems 1989), Ireland
- Zulfikar Ghose, The Loss of India Pakistani poet, published in the United Kingdom
- Eoghan Ó Tuairisc, Ireland
  - The Weekend of Dermot and Grace
  - Lux Aeterna, including Hiroshima Mass
- Hone Tuwhare, No Ordinary Sun, Māori poet writing in English, New Zealand

== Works in other languages ==
Listed by nation where the work was first published and again by the poet's native land, if different; substantially revised works listed separately:

=== Danish ===
- Inger Christensen, Graess
- Klaus Rifbjerg, Portraet
- Knud Holst, Trans
- Jørgen Sonne, Krese

=== French ===
==== Canada, in French ====
- Marie-Claire Blais, Existences, Québec: Éditions Garneau
- Jacques Brault, Mémoire
- Paul Chamberland, L'Afficheur hurle
- Gilbert Choquette, L'Honneur de vivre
- Cécile Cloutier, Cuivre et soies
- Paul-Marie Lapointe, Pour les âmes
- Fernand Oullette, Le Soliel sous la mort

==== France ====
- Louis Aragon, near simultaneous publication of four works:
  - Series of discussions with F. Crémieux on the philosophical and literary ideas of the poet
  - Il ne m'est Paris que d'Elsa, a collection of poems
  - a "lengthy and ambitious historical poem"
  - Le Voyage en Hollande
- René Char:
  - Commune Presence
  - Les Matinaux
- Michel Deguy, Biefs
- Jean Follain, Appareil de la terre
- Roger Giroux, L'arbre temps, winner of the Prix Max Jacob, the author's sole published book during his lifetime
- Edmond Jabès, Le Livre de Yukel
- A. Marissel, La Nouvelle parabole, winner of the first Louise Labé Prize
- Pierre Oster, La Grande Année
- Marcelin Pleynet, Paysages en deux suivis de Les Lignes de la prose
- Jean-Pierre Richard, Onze Etudes sur la poésie moderne, criticism
- Denis Roche, Les Idées centésimales de Miss Elanize

==== Anthologies ====
- J. L. Bédouin, editor, La Poésie surréaliste
- G. E. Clancier, editor, Panorama critique de Chénier á Baudelaire

=== German ===
- Erich Fried, Warngedichte
- Hans Magnus Enzensberger, Blindenschrift
- Walter Höllerer, Der andere Gast
- Günter Eich, Zu den Akten

=== Hebrew ===
- Yaakov Cahan, the collected works
- Esther Rab, Shirai-
- Leah Goldberg, Im ha-Laila Hazeh ("On This Night")
- Daliah Rivikovich, Horef Kasheh ("Hard Winter")
- Dan Pagis, Shehut Mauhereth ("Belated Lingering")
- David Avidan, Masheu Bishvil Mishehu ("Something for Someone")
- Amir Gilboa, Kehulim Vaadumin ("The Blues and the Reds")
- Eldad Andan, Lo Bishmahot kalot ("Not with Joys Lightly")
- B. Mordecai, Nefilim ba-Aretz ("Giants on Earth")
- Aaron Zeitlin, Min ha-Adam Vomaila ("From Man and Higher"), comprising two dramatic poems by this American publishing in Israel
- Chaim Brandwein, be-Tzel ha-Argaman ("In the Shadow of the Purple"), a first book of poems by this American publishing in Israel
- Abraham Regelson, Hakukot Otiotaich ("Engraved Are Thy Letters"), by an American poet living in Israel

=== Italian ===
- Bartolo Cattafi, L'osso, l'anima
- Corrado Costa, Pseudobaudelaire avant-garde poetry
- Eugenio Miccini, Sonetto minore avant-garde poetry
- Elio Pagliarani, La lezione di fisica avant-garde poetry
- Pier Paulo Pasolini, Poesia in forma di rosa
- Lamberto Pignotti, La nozione dell'uomo avant-garde poetry
- Antonio Porta, Aprire avant-garde poetry
- Edoardo Sanguineti, Triperuno avant-garde poetry
- Cesare Vivaldi, Dettagli avant-garde poetry
- Gruppo '63 (published this spring), an anthology of poems, critical essays, and passages from plays and novels by writers who had rebelled in recent years against standard conventions in literature.

=== Norwegian ===
- Ernst Orvil, Kontakt
- Astrid Hjertenaes Andersen, Frokost 'i det grønne
- Harald Sverdrup, Sang til solen

=== Russian ===
- Bella Akhmadulina, "published an extensive sheaf of nonpolitical, impressionistic verse", according to Harrison E. Salisbury
- Alexander Mezhirov, Прощание со снегом ("Farewell to the Snow"), Russia, Soviet Union
- Andrei Voznesensky, "a number of poems, including several devoted to Lenin", according to Harrison E. Salisbury

=== Portuguese language ===
==== Brazil ====
- Lupe Cotrim Garaude, O poeta e o mundo, her fourth collection

=== Spanish language ===
==== Latin America ====
- Jorge Carrera Andrade, Floresta de los Guacamayos (Ecuador), published in Nicaragua while he was ambassador to the United States
- Jorge Luis Borges, El otro, el mismo (Argentina)
- Arturo Corcuera, Primavera triunfante (Peru)
- Gonzalo Rojas, Contra la muerte (Chile)
- Pablo Neruda, Memorial de Isla Negra (Chile), the first of his 5-volume poetic memoir
- Roque Vallejos, Los arcángeles ebrios (Paraguay)
- Sarah Bollo (Uruguay):
  - Diana transfigurada
  - Tierra y Cielo

===== Anthologies =====
- Instituto Torcuato Di Tella, Poesía argentina (sic), including selections from 10 Argentinian poets, most born in the 1920s or later
- Oscar Echeverri Mejía and Alfonso Bonilla-Naar, editors, 21 años de poesía colombiana (sic), with poems from the more prominent Colombian poets in the two decades from 1942 to 1963

===== Criticism, scholarship, and biography in Latin America =====
- Raúl Silva Castro, Pablo Neruda, an analysis of his poetry
- Jorge Carrera Andrade, Interpretación de Rubén Darío (Nicaragua)
- Luis Alberto Cabrales, Rubén Darío, breve biografía (Nicaragua)
- Rubén Darío periodista, a collection of his journalism compiled by the Nicaragua Ministry of Public Education

==== Spain ====
- Jorge Guillén, Tréboles
- José García Nieto, La hora undécima
- Gerardo Diego, La suerte o la muerte
- Fernando Quiñones, En vida, winner of the Leopoldo Panero Prize by the Instituto de Cultura Hispánica

===== Criticism, scholarship and biography in Spain =====
- Gabriel Celaya, Exploración de la poesía
- José Francisco Cirré, La poesía de José Moreno Villa
- Books published for the centenary year of Miguel de Unamuno (died 1936), an essayist, novelist, poet, playwright and philosopher:
  - Manuel García Blanco, América y Unamuno
  - Julio César Chaves, Unamuno y América
  - Julio García Morejón, Unamuno y Portugal
  - Sebastián de la Nuez, Unamuno en Canarias
  - Ricardo Gullón, Autobiografías de Unamuno

=== Yiddish ===
- Mordechai Gebirtig, a new edition of the poet's works
- Itzhak Katzenelson, a new edition of the poet's works
- Abraham Sutzkever, a two-volume edition of the poet's works
- Joseph Rubinstein, Khurbn Polyn ("Polish Jewry: a Lament")
- Binem Heller, a book of poems
- Jacob Zonshayn, a book of poems
- Paltiel Tsibulski, a book of poems
- Joseph Papiernikov, a book of poems
- I. Manik, a book of poems
- Israel Goichberg, a book of poems
- Rosa Gutman, a book of poems
- Aleph Katz, a book of poems

=== Other ===
- Breyten Breytenbach, Die ysterkoei moet sweet ("The Iron Cow Must Sweat"), South African in Afrikaans
- Ernst Enno, Väike luuleraamat, Estonia
- Lars Forstell, Röster (Sweden)
- Ismail Kadare, Përse mendohen këto male ("What Are These Mountains Musing On?"), Albania
- Eeva Liisa Manner, Niin vaihtuivat vuoden ajat (Finland)
- Sean O Riordain, Brosna, including "Claustrophobia", "Reo" and "Fiabhras", Gaelic-language, Ireland
- Rituraj, Main Angiras, Alwar: Kavita Prakashan; India, Hindi-language
- Hijam Anganhal Singh, Khamba Thoibi Sherireng, abridged form of the popular Khamba Thoibi folk ballad, sung on festive occasions and about the last incarnation of Khamba and Thoibi; one of the first epics in modern Meitei poetry; written in 1940 but first published this year; India
- Arvo Turtiainen, Runoja 1934-1964 (Finland)

== Awards and honors ==
=== Australia ===
- Grace Leven Prize for Poetry: David Rowbotham, All the Room

=== Canada ===
- 1964 Governor General's Awards:
  - No poetry award for English this year
  - Poetry award (French): Gratien Lapointe, Ode au Saint-Laurent

=== United Kingdom ===
- Eric Gregory Award: Robert Nye, Ken Smith, Jean Symons, Ted Walker
- Queen's Gold Medal for Poetry: R. S. Thomas

=== United States ===
- Consultant in Poetry to the Library of Congress (later the post would be called "Poet Laureate Consultant in Poetry to the Library of Congress"): Reed Whittemore appointed this year.
- National Book Award for Poetry: John Crowe Ransom, Selected Poems
- Pulitzer Prize for Poetry: Louis Simpson: At The End Of The Open Road
- Fellowship of the Academy of American Poets: Elizabeth Bishop
- Presidential Medal of Freedom awarded by President Lyndon Johnson to 30 people, including Carl Sandburg

=== Other ===
- Danish Academy's literature prize: Erik Knudsen, a poet and playwright
- Critics' Prize for Poetry (Spain): María Elvira Lacaci
- Leopoldo Panero Prize, given by the Instituto de Cultura Hispánica (Spain): Fernando Quiñones, for En vida

== Births ==
- February 18 – David Biespiel, American poet, editor and critic
- May 7 – Kathy Shaidle, Canadian author, columnist and poet
- July 7 – Karina Galvez, Ecuadorian poet
- July 11 – Craig Charles, English actor, presenter and performance poet
- Also:
  - Rafael Campo, gay Cuban-American poet, doctor and author
  - Beth Gylys, American poet and professor

== Deaths ==
Birth years link to the corresponding "[year] in poetry" article:

- January 5 – Leslie Holdsworth Allen (born 1879), Australian academic and poet
- January 22 – Zora Cross (born 1890), Australian poet
- March 1 – Davíð Stefánsson, (born 1895), Icelandic poet
- March 12 – Abbas Al Akkad عباس محمود العقاد (born 1889), Egyptian, Arabic-language writer and poet, a founder of the Divan school of poetry
- April 5 – Tatsuji Miyoshi 三好達治 (born 1900), Japanese, Shōwa period literary critic, editor and poet
- April 26 – E. J. Pratt, 81 (born 1882), Canadian poet
- May 5 – Nagata Mikihiko 長田幹彦 (born 1887), Japanese, Shōwa period poet, playwright and screenwriter
- June 7 – Takamure Itsue 高群逸枝 (born 1894), Japanese poet, writer, feminist, anarchist, ethnologist and historian
- September 18 – Clive Bell, 83 (born 1881), English critic
- October 10 – Oscar Williams, 64 (born 1900), American poet and anthologist
- December 9 – Dame Edith Sitwell, 77 (born 1887), English poet and critic, heart attack
- December 29 – Rofū Miki 三木 露風, pen name of Masao Miki, 75 (born 1889), Japanese Symbolist poet and writer

== See also ==
- Poetry
- List of poetry awards
- List of years in poetry
