= Grosskurth =

Grosskurth or Großkurth is a German surname. Notable people with the surname include:

- Kurt Großkurth (or Grosskurth; 1909–1975), German actor and singer
- Phyllis Grosskurth (1924–2015), Canadian academic, writer, and literary critic
