= The Book of Tbilisi =

2018 anthology of stories about Shanghai

The Book of Tbilisi is an anthology of ten stories from various Georgian writers, edited by Becca Parkinson as well as Gvantsa Jobava and published on 1 April 2018. It is the sixth book of the Reading the City series, focused on stories from and about a certain city, in this case Tbilisi in Georgia.

== Content ==
- Introduction by Gvantsa Jobava
- Uncle Evgeni’s Game by Dato Kardava, translated by Nino Kiguradze
- On Facebook by Gela Chkvanava, translated by Tamar Japaridze
- Precision by Erekle Deisadze, translated by Philip Price
- Peridé by Zviad Kvaratskhelia, translated by Mary Childs
- Tsa by Iva Pezuashvili, translated by Mary Childs
- Flood by Shota Iatashvili, translated by George Siharulidze
- Dad after Mum by Rusudan Rukhadze, translated by Tamar Japaridze
- A Bronx Tale a la Gold Quarter by Lado Kilasonia, translated by Maya Kiasashvili
- Balba-Tso by Ina Archuashvili, translated by Philip Price
- Patagonia by Bacho Kvirtia, translated by Nino Kiguradze
- About the authors
- About the translators

== Background ==
The Book of Tbilisi is the first ever anthology of Georgian short stories translated into English.

== Reviews ==
Asian Review of Books wrote that "this is an ably edited and exciting collection from the intersection on the globe where East meets West, an area often neglected in surveys of world literature." Daniel Hahn wrote for the European Literature Review, that "as with others in this excellent series [Reading the City], part of the pleasure is not only in the quality of the stories but precisely their variety." It seems, that there "are enough though that give a sense of this city, however hard it might be for us outsiders to pin that down."
