= Stories of Darkness and Dread =

Story collection by Joseph Payne Brennan

- Dust-jacket illustration by Denis Tiani.
- Author: Joseph Payne Brennan
- Cover artist: Denis Tiani
- Language: English
- Genre: Fantasy, horror
- Publisher: Arkham House
- Publication date: 1973
- Publication place: United States
- Media type: Print (hardback)
- Pages: 173

Stories of Darkness and Dread is a collection of stories by American writer Joseph Payne Brennan. It was released in 1973 and was the author's second collection of stories published by Arkham House. It was published in an edition of 4,138 copies. (The colophon in the book states 4,000; however, the more accurate figure is taken from reference sources). Most of the stories had originally appeared in Alfred Hitchcock's Mystery Magazine, Macabre, Magazine of Horror and other magazines, although four of the tales had appeared in Brennan's earlier collection Scream at Midnight (1963).

== Contents ==
Stories of Darkness and Dread contains the following tales:

1. "City of the Seven Winds"
2. "The Keeper of the Dust"
3. "Zombique"
4. "The Seventh Incantation"
5. "Delivery on Erdmore Street"
6. "The Way to the Attic"
7. "Mr. Octbur"
8. "Episode on Cain Street"
9. "Killer Cat"
10. "In the Very Stones"
11. "The House at 1248"
12. "Black Thing at Midnight"
13. "Monton"
14. "Apprehension"
15. "The House on Hazel Street"
16. "The Man in Grey Tweeds"
17. "The North Knoll"
18. "The Dump"

== Sources ==
- Jaffery, Sheldon (1989). The Arkham House Companion. Mercer Island, WA: Starmont House, Inc. p. 104. ISBN 1-55742-005-X.
- Chalker, Jack L.; Mark Owings (1998). The Science-Fantasy Publishers: A Bibliographic History, 1923-1998. Westminster, MD and Baltimore: Mirage Press, Ltd. p. 50.
- Joshi, S.T. (1999). Sixty Years of Arkham House: A History and Bibliography. Sauk City, WI: Arkham House. p. 130. ISBN 0-87054-176-5.
- Nielsen, Leon (2004). Arkham House Books: A Collector's Guide. Jefferson, NC and London: McFarland & Company, Inc. pp. 116–117. ISBN 0-7864-1785-4.
