= Creep to Death =

- Dust-jacket from the first edition
- Author: Joseph Payne Brennan
- Illustrator: Jane F. Kendall
- Cover artist: Jane F. Kendall
- Language: English
- Genre: poetry
- Publisher: Donald M. Grant, Publisher, Inc.
- Publication date: 1981
- Publication place: United States
- Media type: Print (Hardback)
- Pages: 125 pp
- ISBN: 0-937986-47-X
- OCLC: 8514719

Creep to Death is a collection of poems by Joseph Payne Brennan. It was published in 1981 by Donald M. Grant, Publisher, Inc. in an edition of 750 copies, all of which were signed by the author and the artist.

== Contents ==
- "I Envy the Deer"
- "Winter Dusk"
- "Artifice"
- "Snow at Night"
- "My Adolescent Dreams"
- "Potter's Field"
- "Advent of Autumn"
- "Abandoned Factory Yard"
- "Encounter"
- "Skeleton"
- "Walking in New Haven"
- "Age"
- "Remembering the Wind"
- "The Watcher"
- "Rat"
- "Three Buzzards"
- "Deserted Farm, New England"
- "Death of a Minor Poet"
- "Old Victorian House"
- "Nightmare One"
- "Nightmare Two"
- "Nightmare Three"
- "Drough"
- "Reminiscence: Emergency Room"
- "Refrain"
- "The Older Gods"
- "Halloween Snow"
- "The Follower"
- "At the Cemetery Gate"
- "Burnt Summer"
- "The Soundless Scream"
- "Words: Late Winter"
- "Beyond the Night"
- "The Haunted Ways"
- "Tides"
- "The Waxwork Woods"
- "The One Silence"
- "On the Death of Scootch, My Cat"
- "Sorcerer's Web"
- "New England Farmer Dying"
- "Mummy"
- "November Day"
- "Empty Rooms"
- "Ice Forest at Midnight"
- "The Cold Cliffs"
- "Epitaph for Earth"
- "Early Autumn"
- "Sunday Morning"
- "When Cedar Woods"
- "Writhing Wind"
- "The Closer Light"
- "The Abandoned Boudoir"
- "Junkman"
- "Selection"
- "Where in Blinding Light"
- "The Act of Hours"
- "Time and Falling Snow"
- "Marsh Moment"
- "Poe's Lake"
- "Bleak November Days"
- "Down Endless Years"
- "My Father's Death"
- "Grottos of Horror"
- "The Collector"
- "Marrow Cold"
- "My True Love"
- "Dust"
- "The Horror"
- "The Ugly Avoided Places"
- "Gradations of Death"
- "Summation"
- "Sea Grotto"
- "The Leech Collector"
- "Farrison"
- "After Fifty"
- "Hell: A Variation"
- "My Nineteenth Nightmare"
- "Century's End"
- "Junkyard in Winter"
- "Final Assignation"
- "The Trail I took"
- "Written in Despair"
- "Return"
- "Walk on, My Darling"
- Three Poems by Doris Philbrick Brennan:
  - "Nightmare"
  - "Alone"
  - "Path to Nowhere"
