= Zbigniew Herbert International Literary Award =

Polish literary award

- Awarded for: outstanding artistic and intellectual literary achievements
- Country: Poland
- Presented by: The Zbigniew Herbert Foundation
- First award: 2013

The Zbigniew Herbert International Literary Award (Polish: Międzynarodowa Nagroda Literacka im. Zbigniewa Herberta) is a Polish international literature prize established in 2013 in Warsaw and named after a Polish poet, essayist, and moralist Zbigniew Herbert (1924–1998). It is conferred annually by the Zbigniew Herbert Foundation and its aim is to recognize "outstanding artistic and intellectual literary achievements on the world stage which have a bearing on the world of values towards which Zbigniew Herbert’s work gravitated".

== History ==
In 2010, the Zbigniew Herbert Foundation was set up to preserve and promote Herbert's "creative legacy as an integral part of the literary and cultural heritage of Poland, Europe and the world" as well as to encourage and support "education in the fields of literature and the humanities, particularly modern literature, writing, poetry and journalism, with a special emphasis on programs for young people". The initiative to establish the foundation was put forward by his wife Katarzyna Dzieduszycka-Herbert.

The jury selecting the winners of the award have included many renowned literature experts and authors such as Edward Hirsch, Jaume Vallcorba Plana, Tomas Venclova, Yurii Andrukhovych, Agneta Pleijel, Michael Krüger, Lidija Dimkovska, and Jarosław Mikołajewski.

== Laureates ==
Year	Laureate(s)	Image	Citizenship(s)	Institution(s)	Source(s)
2026	Ana Blandiana	Ana	Romania	Babeș-Bolyai University	
2025	Anne Carson	Anne	Canada	University of Toronto	
2024	Yang Lian	Tang	Switzerland, China	European Graduate School	
2023	Tomas Venclova	Tomas	Lithuania	University of Vilnius	
2022	Marianna Kiyanovska	Marianna	Ukraine	University of Lviv	
2021	Yusef Komunyakaa	Yusef Komunyakaa	United States	New York University	
2020	Durs Grünbein	Durs Grünbein	Germany	Kunstakademie Düsseldorf	
2019	Agi Mishol	Agi Mishol	Israel	Hebrew University of Jerusalem	
2018	Nuala Ní Dhomhnaill	Nuala Ní Dhomhnaill	Ireland	University College Cork	
2017	Breyten Breytenbach	Breyten Breytenbach	South Africa / France	University of Cape Town	
2016	Lars Gustafsson	Lars Gustafsson	Sweden	University of Texas at Austin	
2015	Ryszard Krynicki	Ryszard Krynicki	Poland	Adam Mickiewicz University	
2014	Charles Simic	Charles Simic	Serbia / United States	University of New Hampshire	
2013	W.S. Merwin	W.S. Merwin	United States	Princeton University	

== See also ==
- Angelus Award
- Silesius Poetry Award
- Polish literature
