= Nine Horrors and a Dream =

- Jacket illustration by Frank Utpatel
- Author: Joseph Payne Brennan
- Cover artist: Frank Utpatel
- Language: English
- Genre: Fantasy, Horror
- Publisher: Arkham House
- Publication date: 1958
- Publication place: United States
- Media type: Print (hardback)
- Pages: 120

Nine Horrors and a Dream is a collection of fantasy and horror short stories by American writer Joseph Payne Brennan. It was released in 1958 by Arkham House in an edition of 1,336 copies. It was the author's first collection of stories to be published.

The jacket front panel and spine give the title only as Nine Horrors, although the full title appears on the inner jacket flap and title page.

Some of the stories had originally appeared in the magazine Weird Tales and other pulps of the 1950s. One of the stories, "Levitation", was adapted for the television series Tales from the Darkside.

"The Calamander Chest" was recorded by Vincent Price for inclusion on the Caedmon Educational Recordings release of The Goblins at the Bathhouse, 1978. The title is from the Ruth Manning-Sanders tale on side 1.

The volume was reprinted by Ballantine Books (pb, 1962) with a cover illustration by Richard Powers. A recent pb reprint has been issued by Dover Publications (2019).

== Contents ==
Nine Horrors and a Dream contains the following tales:

1. "Slime"
2. "Levitation"
3. "The Calamander Chest"
4. "Death in Peru"
5. "On the Elevator"
6. "The Green Parrot"
7. "Canavan's Back Yard"
8. "I'm Murdering Mr. Massingham"
9. "The Hunt"
10. "The Mail for Juniper Hill"

== Sources ==
- Jaffery, Sheldon (1989). The Arkham House Companion. Mercer Island, WA: Starmont House, Inc. pp. 49–50. ISBN 1-55742-005-X.
- Chalker, Jack L.; Mark Owings (1998). The Science-Fantasy Publishers: A Bibliographic History, 1923-1998. Westminster, MD and Baltimore: Mirage Press, Ltd. p. 36.
- Jones, Stephen; Kim Newman (1998). Horror: The 100 Best Books. New York: Carroll & Graf. pp. 167–170. ISBN 0-7867-0552-3.
- Joshi, S.T. (1999). Sixty Years of Arkham House: A History and Bibliography. Sauk City, WI: Arkham House. p. 65. ISBN 0-87054-176-5.
- Nielsen, Leon (2004). Arkham House Books: A Collector's Guide. Jefferson, NC and London: McFarland & Company, Inc. pp. 78–79. ISBN 0-7864-1785-4.
