= Marianna Kiyanovska =

Ukrainian poet, writer and translator

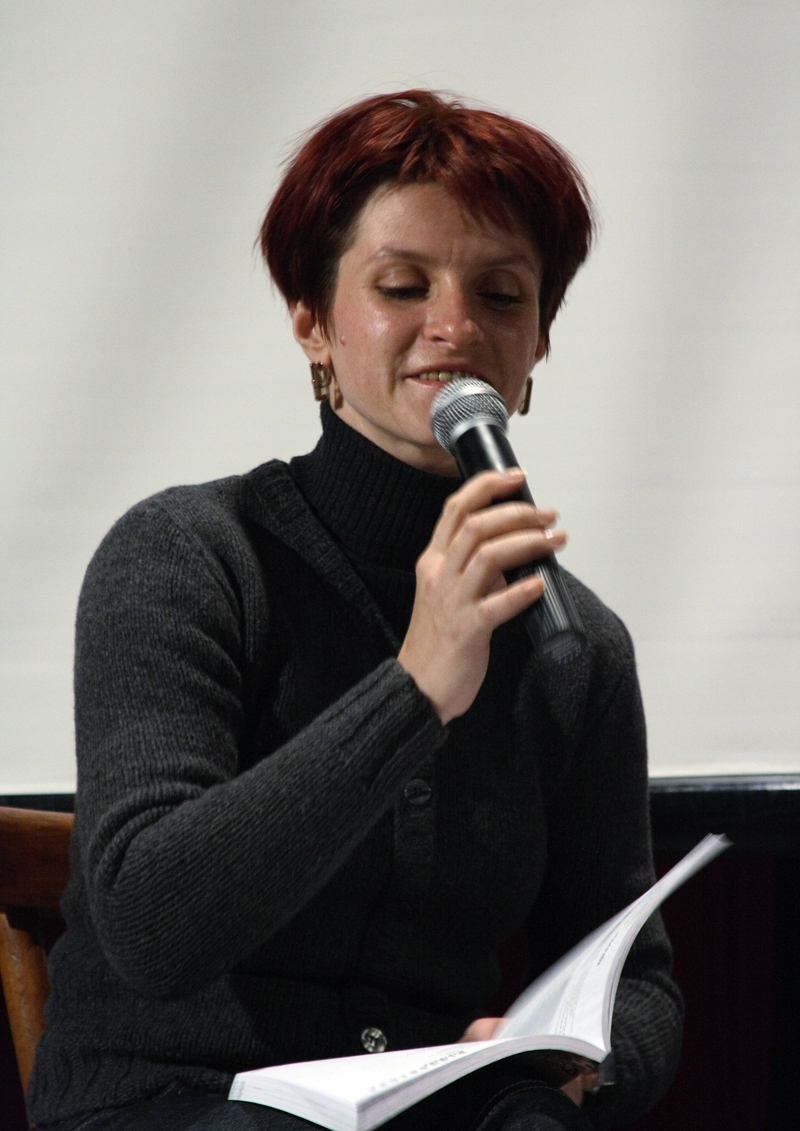
- Born: 17 November 1973 (age 52)
- Education: Ivan Franko National University of Lviv
- Writing career
- Genre: poetry
- Notable work: The Voices of Babyn Yar
- Notable awards: Shevchenko National Prize laureate Zbigniew Herbert International Literary Award

Marianna Kiyanovska (born 17 November 1973) is a Ukrainian poet, translator and a literary scholar and is a recipient of the Shevchenko National Prize (2020) and the Zbigniew Herbert International Literary Award (2022) for the poetry book The Voices of Babyn Yar. She is a member of the National Union of Writers of Ukraine and PEN Ukraine.

== Early life and education ==
Marianna Kiyanovska was born on 17 November 1973 in Zhovkva. She holds a degree in Ukrainian studies from the Ivan Franko National University of Lviv. She co-created an all-female literary group called ММЮННА ТУГА, together with Natalka Sniadanko, Mariana Savka and others.

== Career ==
She debuted in 1997 with poetry book Reincarnation. Her works have appeared in various anthologies, almanacs and magazines, such as Svitovyd, Suchasnist, Chetver, Kuryer Kryvbasu, Kalmius, Literatura na Świecie, Studium, Akcent and Ukrainian Quarterly.

In 2011, she founded the Big Hedgehog: the first non-governmental literary award in Ukraine dedicated to honoring authors of books for children and youth. She is the coordinator of the Lviv office of Ukrainian Association of Writers, as well as a member of National Union of Ukrainian Writers and PEN Ukraine.

She works as a translator and has translated to Ukrainian works by Salim Babullaoglu, Julian Tuwim, Eugeniusz Tkaczyszyn-Dycki, Adam Wiedemann, Gintaras Grajauskas, and Shota Iatashvili.

Her works have been translated into eighteen languages including English, German and Italian.

== Scholarships and awards ==
She has won scholarships from the Polish Gaude Polonia program (2003, 2009, 2016) and a Slovene CEI Fellowship (2007). In 2011, she was among the finalists for the Joseph Conrad-Korzeniowski Literary Prize and she became the laureate of the International Festival of Poetry Kyiv Laurs. Two years later she was presented with the Polish Medal for Merit to Culture – Gloria Artis. In 2020, she was awarded the Shevchenko National Prize for The Voices of Babyn Yar poetry book, where she lent her voice to the Jewish victims of the Babi Yar massacre. In 2022, its Polish translation received recognition with a European Poet of Freedom Award; later that year Kiyanovska was also awarded the Zbigniew Herbert International Literary Award.

== Publications ==
=== Poetry ===
- Reincarnation (1997)
- Wreath of sonnets (1999)
- Creation of Myths (2000)
- Love and War (with Mariana Savka, 2000)
- Book of Adam (2004)
- Common Language (2005)
- Something daily (2008)
- To EP (2014)
- 373 (2014)
- Letters from Lithuania/Letters from Lviv (with Mariana Savka, 2016)
- The Voices of Babyn Yar (2017)

=== Prose ===
- Path along the river (2008) – stories

== See also ==
- List of Ukrainian-language poets
- List of Ukrainian women writers
- List of Ukrainian literature translated into English
