= Evil Always Ends =

1982 novella by Joseph Payne Brennan

- Cover of the first edition
- Author: Joseph Payne Brennan
- Illustrator: Robert Lavoie
- Cover artist: Robert Lavoie
- Language: English
- Genre: Supernatural, Detective Novella
- Publisher: Donald M. Grant, Publisher, Inc.
- Publication date: 1982
- Publication place: United States
- Media type: Print (Hardback)
- Pages: 123 pp
- ISBN: 0-937986-53-4
- OCLC: 9355290
- LC Class: PS3503.R455 E9x 1982

Evil Always Ends is a supernatural detective novella by Joseph Payne Brennan. It was first published in 1982 by Donald M. Grant, Publisher, Inc. in an edition of 750 copies, all of which were signed by the author and the artist (Robert Lavoie). The book was issued to commemorate Brennan's appearance as Guest of Honor at the 1982 World Fantasy Convention.

== Plot introduction ==
A short detective novel written in the hard-boiled style of the 1930s and 1940s.
