= The Chronicles of Lucius Leffing =

- Cover of the first edition
- Author: Joseph Payne Brennan
- Illustrator: John Linton
- Cover artist: John Linton
- Language: English
- Series: Lucius Leffing
- Genre: Supernatural, Detective short stories
- Publisher: Donald M. Grant, Publisher, Inc.
- Publication date: 1977
- Publication place: United States
- Media type: Print (hardback)
- Pages: 253 pp
- OCLC: 3364239

The Chronicles of Lucius Leffing is a collection of supernatural, detective short stories by Joseph Payne Brennan. It was first published in 1977 by Donald M. Grant, Publisher, Inc. in an edition of 1,540 copies. The stories feature Brennan's supernatural detective, Lucius Leffing. Many of the stories originally appeared in Alfred Hitchcock's Mystery Magazine.

== Contents ==
- Foreword, by Frank Belknap Long
- "The Case of the Hertzell Inheritance"
- "The Case of the Mystified Vendor"
- "The Apple Orchard Murder Case"
- "Mem'ries"
- "The Murder of Mr. Matthews"
- "The Possible Suspects"
- "The Dead of Winter Apparition"
- "The Nightmare Face"
