= The Adventures of Lucius Leffing =

- Cover of the first edition.
- Author: Joseph Payne Brennan
- Illustrator: Luis Ferreira
- Cover artist: Luis Ferreira
- Language: English
- Series: Lucius Leffing
- Genre: Supernatural, detective
- Publisher: Donald M. Grant, Publisher, Inc.
- Publication date: 1990
- Publication place: United States
- Media type: Print (hardback)
- Pages: 224
- ISBN: 0-937986-95-X
- OCLC: 22500354
- Dewey Decimal: 813/.54 21
- LC Class: PS3503.R455 A65 1990

The Adventures of Lucius Leffing is a collection of supernatural, detective short stories by American writer Joseph Payne Brennan. It was first published in 1990 by Donald M. Grant, Publisher, Inc. in an edition of 1,000 copies, all of which were signed by the author and the artist. The stories feature Brennan's supernatural detective, Lucius Leffing. All but four of the stories first appeared in this collection. The others were taken from the magazines Weird Tales and Mike Shayne Mystery Magazine or from the anthology Night Visions 2, edited by Charles L. Grant.

== Contents ==
- "The Nursing Home Horror"
- "The Vanning Case"
- "The Swamp Horror"
- "Death on 91"
- "Copycat Killer"
- "Murder in the Parks"
- "The Butcher Knife Murder"
- "Motive for Murder"
- "Wanderson’s Waste"
- "The Haunting at Juniper Hill"
- "The Delivery"
- "The Spruce Valley Monster"
- "Observations on Lorimer Street"

== Sources ==
- Brown, Charles N.; William G. Contento (2007-11-20). "The Locus Index to Science Fiction (1984-1998)".
- Chalker, Jack L.; Mark Owings (1998). The Science-Fantasy Publishers: A Bibliographic History, 1923-1998. Westminster, MD and Baltimore: Mirage Press, Ltd. p. 334.
- Clute, John; John Grant (1997). The Encyclopedia of Fantasy. New York: St. Martin's Press. p. 139. ISBN 0-88184-708-9.
