= Act of Providence =

1959 novella by Joseph Payne Brennan

- Cover of the first edition
- Author: Joseph Payne Brennan and Donald M. Grant
- Illustrator: Robert Arrington
- Cover artist: Robert Arrington
- Language: English
- Series: Lucius Leffing
- Genre: Supernatural, detective
- Publisher: Donald M. Grant, Publisher, Inc.
- Publication date: 1979
- Publication place: United States
- Media type: Print (hardback)
- Pages: 222 pp
- OCLC: 5035101

Act of Providence is a supernatural detective novella by Joseph Payne Brennan and Donald M. Grant. It was first published in 1979 by Donald M. Grant, Publisher, Inc. in an edition of 1,450 copies of which 250 (so stated in the book, though some sources contend 350) copies comprised a slipcased deluxe edition signed by the authors (with some also signed by the artist). As with most of the Lucius Leffing tales, the real-life Joseph Payne Brennan features as the detective's offsider and narrator.

== Plot ==
The novella features Brennan's supernatural detective Lucius Leffing and is set during the first World Fantasy Convention in Providence, Rhode Island in 1975. Brennan and his detective friend Lucius Leffing investigate the disappearance of Henry L. P. Beckwith from the convention and are led through a bronze door to a complex of subterranean tunnels beneath what H.P. Lovecraft termed 'the Shunned House' at 135 Benefit Street in Providence. They discover that a race of troglodytes has been surviving beneath Providence and worshipping a huge sea-creature for possibly millennia, but that the troglodytes have now virtually died out. In the interest of safety, Leffing organises to dynamite the underground lair of the sea-monster and of the now-dead troglodytes.

The novel (which critic John Clute classes as a 'recursive fantasy') features various real-life personalities who attended the convention as characters, though many are mentioned only in passing. These personalities include Robert Bloch, Henry L. P. Beckwith, Kirby McCauley, Frank Belknap Long, Gahan Wilson, John H. Stanley (the then-librarian of the Lovecraft Special Collection at John Hay Library) and others.
