= Natalka Sniadanko =

Ukrainian writer

- Наталка Володимирівна Сняданко
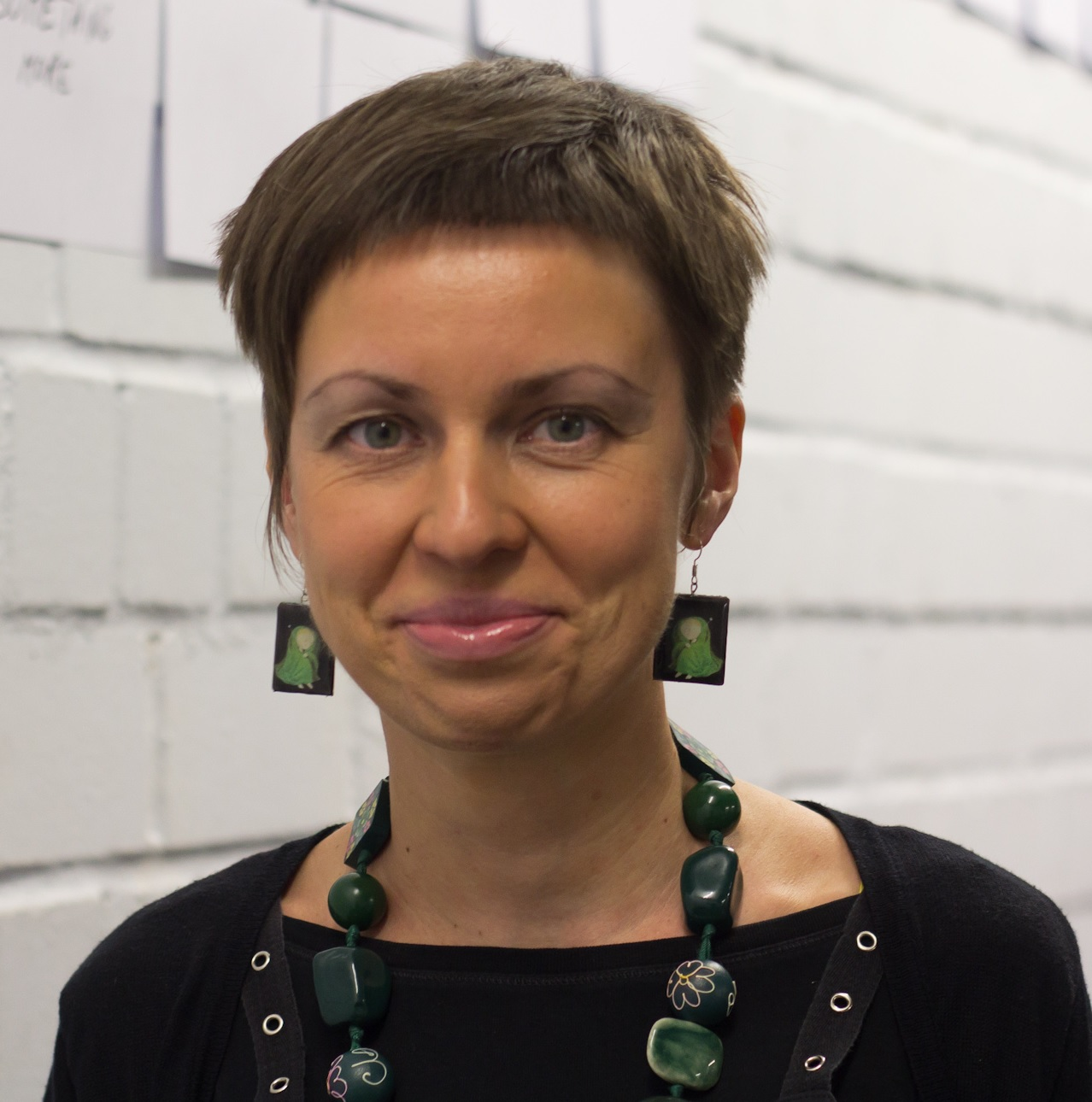
- Natalka Sniadanko in 2014
- Born: 20 May 1973 (age 53); Lviv, Ukraine
- Education: University of Lviv; University of Freiburg

Natalka Volodymyrivna Sniadanko (Ukrainian Наталка Володимирівна Сняданко) is a Ukrainian writer, journalist, and translator. She won the Joseph Conrad Korzeniowski Literary Prize in 2011.

== Biography ==
Natalka Sniadanko was born in Lviv, Ukraine, where she currently resides and has lived for most of her life. Sniadanko studied Ukrainian language and literature at the University of Lviv and Slavonic and Renaissance Studies at the University of Freiburg. She co-created an all-female literary group called ММЮННА ТУГА together with Marianna Kiyanovska, Mariana Savka and others.

Her debut novel, Collection of Passions (Колекція пристрастей), was published in 2001. She has written seven novels. Her novel Frau Müller Does Not Wish to Pay More was nominated for BBC Ukraine's Book of the Year. Sniadanko's works have been translated into eleven languages, including English, Spanish, German, Polish, Hungarian, Czech, and Russian.

She translates novels and theater plays from German and Polish into Ukrainian. Sniadanko has translated the works of writers including Franz Kafka, Max Goldt, Gunter Grass, Zbigniew Herbert, Czesław Miłosz.

As a journalist, her work has appeared in Süddeutsche Zeitung and in translation in The New York Times, The Guardian, The New Republic, and The Brooklyn Rail. In The New Republic, Sniadanko wrote about the start of the Euromaidan at Maidan.

Sniadanko appeared in the television documentary Mythos Galizien – Die Suche nach der ukrainischen Identität. In June 2020, Natalka Sniadanko was included in the long list of Central European literary awards "Angelus" for the book Frau Müller Does not Wish To Pay More.

== Notable works ==
- Колекція пристрастей (2001) (Collection of Passions)
  - The Passion Collection, or The Adventures and Misadventures of a Young Ukrainian Lady (2010), translated by Jennifer Croft
- Сезонний позпродаж блондинок (2005) (Seasonal Sale of Blondes)
- Синдром стерильності (2006) (Syndrome of Sterility)
- Чебрець у молоці (2007) (Thyme in Milk)
- Комашина тарзанка (2009) (Insects' Bungee)
- Гербарій коханців (2011) (Herbarium of Lovers)
- Фрау Мюллер не налаштована платити більше (2013) (Frau Müller Does not Wish To Pay More)
- Охайні прописи ерцгерцога Вільгельма (2017) (Archduke Wilhelm's ordinary exercise books)
- Перше слідство імператриці (2021) (The first investigation of the Empress)
