= Māori poetry =

Traditional Māori poetry was always sung or chanted, musical rhythms rather than linguistic devices served to distinguish it from prose. There is a large store of traditional chants and songs. Rhyme or assonance were not devices used by the Māori; only when a given text is sung or chanted will the metre become apparent. The lines are indicated by features of the music. The language of poetry tends to differ stylistically from prose. Typical features of poetic diction are the use of synonyms or contrastive opposites, and the repetition of key words. As with poetry in other languages: "Archaic words are common, including many which have lost any specific meaning and acquired a religious mystique. Abbreviated, sometimes cryptic utterances and the use of certain grammatical constructions not found in prose are also common" (Biggs 1966:447–448).

== Modern Māori poets ==
- Arapera Blank
- Bub Bridger
- Rangi Faith
- Rowley Habib
- Hirini Melbourne
- Jacquie Sturm
- Robert Sullivan
- Hone Tuwhare
- Tayi Tibble

== Bibliography ==
- B.G. Biggs, 'Maori Myths and Traditions' in A. H. McLintock (editor), Encyclopaedia of New Zealand, 3 Volumes. (Government Printer: Wellington), 1966, II:447–454.
