= Lilith Lorraine =

American poet and science fiction writer (1894–1967)

- Lilith Lorraine, from a 1943 publication
- Born: Mary Maude Dunn; March 19, 1894; Corpus Christi, Texas, US
- Died: November 9, 1967 (aged 73); Corpus Christi, Texas, US
- Occupation: Writer
- Spouse: Cleveland L. Wright (1912–1967, his death)
- Writing career
- Period: 1920s–1967
- Genres: Science fiction, poetry

Lilith Lorraine was the pen-name of Mary Maude Dunn Wright (March 19, 1894 — November 9, 1967) an American pulp fiction author, poet, journalist and editor.

== Early life ==
Mary Maude Dunn was born in Corpus Christi, Texas, the daughter of John Beamond "Red" Dunn and Lelia Nias Dunn. Her father was a Texas Ranger. She attended the Incarnate Word Academy in Corpus Christi, and earned a teaching certificate at age 16. She taught in a rural Texas school as a young woman.

== Career ==
=== Journalism ===
After marrying at the age of 18, Lorraine worked in the 1920s as a reporter for the San Francisco Examiner, and later for other west coast papers. During World War II she wrote for the San Antonio Evening News.

=== Fiction ===
Lorraine's feminist utopia novelette, The Brain of the Planet, was published as a chapbook in 1929. Other stories by Lorraine included "Into the 28th Century" (Science and Wonder, 1929), a time-travel story featuring artificial wombs, eugenics, inhaled nutrition, hovercraft, and a woman as President of the United States in 1955; "The Jovian Jest" (Astounding Stories, 1930), "The Celestial Visitor" (Wonder Stories, 1935), "The Isle of Madness" (Wonder Stories, 1935), "Books Hold That Line" (1935), "Entropy" (Orb, 1952), and "Ancestors" (The Avalonian, 1952). Though this represents the sum known total of Lorraine's science fiction, her work was well-received at the time of publication and Lorraine is notable for being a comparatively early example of a successful female science fiction author whose gender was not disguised.

=== Poetry ===
Lorraine was an editor of poetry magazines and early zines. She published several collections of her poetry in the 1930s, 1940s, and 1950s. In the 1940s she was billed as the "founder-director of the Avalon National Poetry Shrine", later known as the Avalon World Arts Academy. In connection with Avalon, she wrote a textbook, Character against Chaos (1947). Her Wine of Wonder (1951) was billed as the first volume of science fiction poetry.

=== Pseudonyms ===
There may be some poetry (and possibly fiction) of Lorraine's that was published under unknown pseudonyms, which Lorraine refused to divulge. "Three of my pen-names are masculine," she explained to a reporter in 1965, "and if the editors and publishers knew I was a woman they wouldn't pay me more than half what they do now." By the time of this quote, Lorraine was exclusively a writer of poetry, saying of editors that "whenever they see a woman's name on a piece of verse, they immediately think it will be too sentimental or mushy. They would consider the same verse strong and dynamic under a man's name."

== Personal life ==
Mary Maude Dunn married Cleveland Lamar Wright in 1912. Both were native born Texans, and lived the majority of their lives in Texas -- though not all of it. The two lived in California for long stretches of time from the 1920s. The 1940 U.S. census shows them living in Texas, as does a 1942 draft registration card for Cleveland, but the 1950 census lists them living in Benton, Arkansas. According to Lorraine's own account, they also lived in Mexico for seven years, and at various points lived in New Orleans, New York City, and (circa 1929) in Tucson. Both Wrights moved back to Lorraine's home town of Corpus Christi in 1962; both Wrights died there in 1967, Mary Maude a few months after her husband. After she died, the Odessa Poetry Society named an annual prize "The Lilith Lorraine Memorial Award".
