= 1964 Governor General's Awards =

Canadian literary award

Each winner of the 1964 Governor General's Awards for Literary Merit was selected by a panel of judges administered by the Canada Council for the Arts.

== Winners ==
=== English Language ===
- Fiction: Douglas LePan, The Deserter.
- Poetry or Drama: Raymond Souster, The Colour of the Times.
- Non-Fiction: Phyllis Grosskurth, John Addington Symonds.

=== French Language ===
- Fiction: Jean-Paul Pinsonneault, Les terres sèches.
- Poetry or Drama: Pierre Perrault, Au coeur de la rose.
- Non-Fiction: Réjean Robidoux, Roger Martin du Gard et la religion.
