= Leslie de Noronha =

Indian writer

Leslie de Noronha was an Indian writer, medical doctor, and music critic. He is one of the early Indian writers in English.

== Personal life ==
He is of Goan origin.

== Career ==
Noronha has himself described The Dew Drop Inn as "not a political or historical story, neither a love story" and has said that he conceived of the idea and planned it in 1958, while in New York. He added: "Then, on December 18th, 1961, the Indian militia entered Goa and, after 36 hours that electrified the world, the mighty Portuguese Empire came crashing down with the maximum of drama possible. And I found myself with the MS [manuscript] of what was overnight virtually a historical novel."

== Reception ==
Critic Peter Nazareth, who wrote a review of The Dew Drop Inn that was published in World Literature Today writes, "The Dew Drop Inn is a sequel to The Mango and the Tamarind Tree, published in 1970 though completed a decade earlier. The protagonist of Leslie de Noronha's first novel, a journalist living in England and reporting on events such as the assassination of Mrs. Gandhi, the Bhopal tragedy, and AIDS in India, reappears in "The Book of Raoul Albuquerque," which summarizes what happened earlier, including the breakup of the love of Raoul and Estelle, born in Nairobi." The Dew Drop Inn significantly covers homosexuality as the theme of desire which appears in the book through a Character named Steven, who later commits suicide after he is drugged and raped by Edwin, Claude and Jake.

Sandeep Bakshi describes the novel thus: "[S]et in both independent India and Britain, it (The Dew Drop Inn) intertwines the stories of a wide array of people, and functions, in a manner akin to Scott’s novels, as an archive of the end-of-the-Raj society."

The author was a doctor in England. He believes in the advice he once received there: that a trivial incident can change a life. This happens in the book too. Shantimarg is a fictitious montage of "all Himalayan hill stations". Medical colleges at Bombay and London get featured here too. This book in part is "to a great extent autobiographical, if highly dramatized". The Mango and the Tamarind Tree was Noronha's earlier novel.

Another of his publications, Poems, was published by the Writers' Workshop in 1965.

Agarwal and Sinha comment: "With a growing interest in Indian English literature, there has been a sudden spurt of fiction, many of them first novels during the nineteen seventies. Notable among those novelists are — BK Karanjia, Leslie de Noronha, Timeri Murari, ...".

Donna J Young describes his novel The Mango and the Tamarind Tree as offering an "insight into the feelings of Goans who had a Portuguese identity that changed into a Goan one after the end of the colonial period. On the surface, the novel deals with the affluent but disintegrating Albuquerque family. In reality, De Noronha is showing the disintegration of Portuguese identity in Goa by having the novel’s main character Raoul break with many traditions. He refuses to go through an arranged marriage, falls in love with a woman from a lower class, and he sells the family home after his mother’s death. Raoul’s heritage is his enemy. It kept him from marrying the woman he loved and from the international career he loved. By giving up his traditions Raoul symbolizes Goans giving up Portuguese traditions and shows the upheaval that frequently accompanies major political change and the reaction to it...."

His work is included in The Golden Treasury of Indo-Anglian Poetry, 1828-1965, edited by Vinayak Krishna Gokak.

== Bibliography ==
His works include:

- The Dew Drop Inn, Writers Workshop greenbird book. 1994. Original from the University of Michigan digitized on 29 May 2008. ISBN 8171897304, 9788171897308. 297 pp.
- "FROM 'THE MANGO AND THE TAMARIND TREE'." Journal of South Asian Literature (1983): 7-13.
