= Böcek (novel) =

1980 book

- Author: Erhan Bener
- Language: Turkish
- Publication date: 1980
- Publication place: Turkey
- Pages: 225
- ISBN: 978-6-051-85046-7

Böcek, published in 1980, is a novel by Turkish author Erhan Bener.

The novel explores the story of a torturing police officer, who sees everyone around him as insects and is obsessively meticulous. His encounter with a crippled beetle, which he initially kills but later repeatedly sees, triggers emotional responses that force him to confront past traumas and alienate him from his profession. Recai, suffering from neurotic crises, becomes paralyzed by the image of the beetle he could never kill and is eventually rescued by his neighbors and taken to an ambulance while on the brink of death in the street.

Erhan Bener's work, created after the 1980 coup, is inspired by his son's experiences. It is written under the influence of Kafka.
