= Today We Choose Faces =

1973 science fiction novel by Roger Zelazny

- Cover of first edition (paperback)
- Author: Roger Zelazny
- Language: English
- Genre: Science fiction
- Publisher: Signet
- Publication date: 1973
- Publication place: United States
- Media type: Print (hardback & paperback)
- Pages: 174
- ISBN: 0-451-15488-6
- OCLC: 317354137

Today We Choose Faces is a 1973 science fiction novel by American writer Roger Zelazny. As originally constructed, Part 1 was an extensive flashback that followed Part 2; but the order of the sections was changed at the request of editor David Hartwell, who felt that the novel worked better in chronological order. Zelazny later wrote, “I was younger then & more in need of the money at the time & couldn’t afford to argue [with] him about it. I still prefer it the way I wrote it.”

== Plot summary ==
The story is set, like many Zelazny pure science fiction novels, a few centuries in the future. The narrator, a Mafia assassin named Angelo di Negri, has been revived from suspended animation by the mostly legitimate successors of the criminal organization, and given a mission to assassinate a scientist on a fortified facility on an otherwise uninhabited planet.

=== Part 1 ===
The first part of the novel describes Negri's assault on the planet, in which he begins the attack in a heavily armed and armored space capsule, which is gradually reduced by the formidable defenses to a ground-attack vehicle, which in turn is slowly degraded until Negri abandons it to continue on foot with hand-held weapons, eventually left only with a stiletto.

After he completes the job, the phone rings. This is a motif throughout the story. His victim has managed to survive even the death of his body, and tells Negri that while they were fighting, war has taken place and humanity is near extinction. Only the technology in another building can preserve the remnants. Negri locates the cache, and sets out on the next phase of his story.

=== Part 2 ===
Despite also being in the first person, the next part of the novel appears to have nothing to do with Negri. The narrator is a member of some secret cabal scattered throughout the House, a series of artificial environments where people live, never seeing the outdoors. It seems this cabal is in charge of the House, and someone is killing the members one by one.

Each death jolts the others, so they are evidently clones. (As described earlier in the novel, cloning can be accomplished, although clones have some unexplained psychic connection to each other). One of the cabal is the Nexus, the one who can interface with the computer that seems to run everything. Each time a Nexus is killed, his consciousness transfers to another member. The narration passes from one Nexus to the next as the killer works his way through his list. Each one gets the memories of his predecessor at the moment of death.

The House has Wings, different sections, connected by Passages, which may really be wormholes in space. Some Wings are residential, some offices, some manufacturing, some maintenance etc. There are also levels within Wings. Wing Null is where the computer is, and also where a series of pins in a circuit board represent stages in the cabal's cleansing of evil instincts and bad memories from its collective personality. This mirrors the avowed purpose of the House - to rid humanity of all the traits which brought about its downfall, so it is fit to be let loose once more. This involves occasionally removing people with undesirable characteristics, in the effort to breed a better human.

The narrator has to deal with an internal demon, a voice that tries to get him to remove the most recent pin. Old memories are not entirely suppressed and manifest themselves in this way. As the menace from the killer - now known as Mr. Black, grows, the voice becomes more persistent until one by one the pins are removed, revealing more about the history of the cabal.

The narrator is further dogged by a woman, whose father was forced to commit suicide by the cabal to suppress an unwanted technology, and who seems to know Mr. Black. This section of the story features running battles through offices, factories and service tunnels, as the narrator hunts and is hunted by Mr. Black. In one scene the narrator is attempting to escape through offices, and as he passes each desk the phone rings in some mocking version of the pursuit.

As the pins are removed, the narrator becomes a more capable hunter, and more ruthless. Finally, the narrator kills Black, who dies with a smile on his face. It quickly becomes obvious why. Black is another clone, and his personality transfers to one of the cabal.

The narrator fights off the transfer, but realizes that in doing so he has allowed Black to take over one of the others, who are all in Wing Null. Arriving there with the woman in tow, he finds that all but one are dead, and Black has escaped to the Outside. He has also pulled all but the last pin. In a final fight across the same blasted landscape where Negri attacked in the beginning, Black kills the narrator, but then has to deal with the inevitable transfer.

=== Finale ===
Black becomes the new narrator. He was a stolen clone, but he did not remember his origins. He simply lived in the cracks in the House society, somehow being helped by an unknown party. He eventually became the cabal's nemesis, intent on opening the House and setting humanity free again. But now he is the cabal, with all their conflicting memories and motives. He has to fight his way back to Wing Null, dealing with all the old defenses again.

It becomes obvious that the clones are all related to Angelo Negri. With the pulling of the final pin, Negri's personality is restored. He realizes that the House is a failure. The only thing left to do is to break open the various Wings and shut down the computer. This he does. For the last time, the phone rings. The woman answers. It is the disembodied scientist, who has been manipulating events all along.

Negri tells the woman to take a message.

== Reception ==
Zelazny biographer F. Brett Cox called it "as thoughtful, ambitious, and audacious as any of Zelazny's work from the 1960s". Cox compared its "frantic, one-trapdoor-after-another narrative, with transitions frequently driven by explosive violence and one key sequence represented in eccentric typography" to the work of Alfred Bester; he compared its "narrative pacing and (...) underlying tale of libertarian revolt against oppressive social engineering" to that of A. E. van Vogt; and he noted the influence of Philip K. Dick's "visions of paranoid existential dread". Richard E. Geis praised it as "the finest novel Roger Zelazny has written in years" and "the perfect combination of sense of wonder, action-suspense, and food-for-thought."

== Notes ==
The protagonist's name is Angelo di Negri, which means "Angel of Blacks" in Italian. All of his 12 clones have names that allude to Black or Angel, or are anagrams of Angel. Some examples include Engel (German for "angel"), Lange (anagram of "angel"), Winkel (German for "angle", an anagram of angel), and Jordan (the angel in Here Comes Mister Jordan). The complete list is shown in the character biography in The Collected Stories of Roger Zelazny, Volume 3: This Mortal Mountain.
