= Roque Vallejos =

Poet, psychiatrist and essayist from Paraguay

Roque Vallejos (1943 in Asunción – 2 April 2006 in Asunción) was a poet, psychiatrist and essayist from Paraguay.

== Background ==
He was a forensic surgeon in the High Court of Justice.

He served as a member and the president of the Academia de la Lengua Paraguaya.

== Career as a writer ==
He belonged to the so-called 60 generation. This group was concerned with social poetry and politics during Alfredo Stroessner's dictatorship (1954-1989).

== Works ==
- Los arcángeles ebrios (The Drunk Archangels), (1964)
- Poemas del Apocalipsis (Poems from Apocalypse), (1969)
- Los labios del silencio (Silence Lips), (1986)
- Tiempo baldío (Vain Time), (1988)
