= Mariana Savka =

Ukrainian poet and children's writer

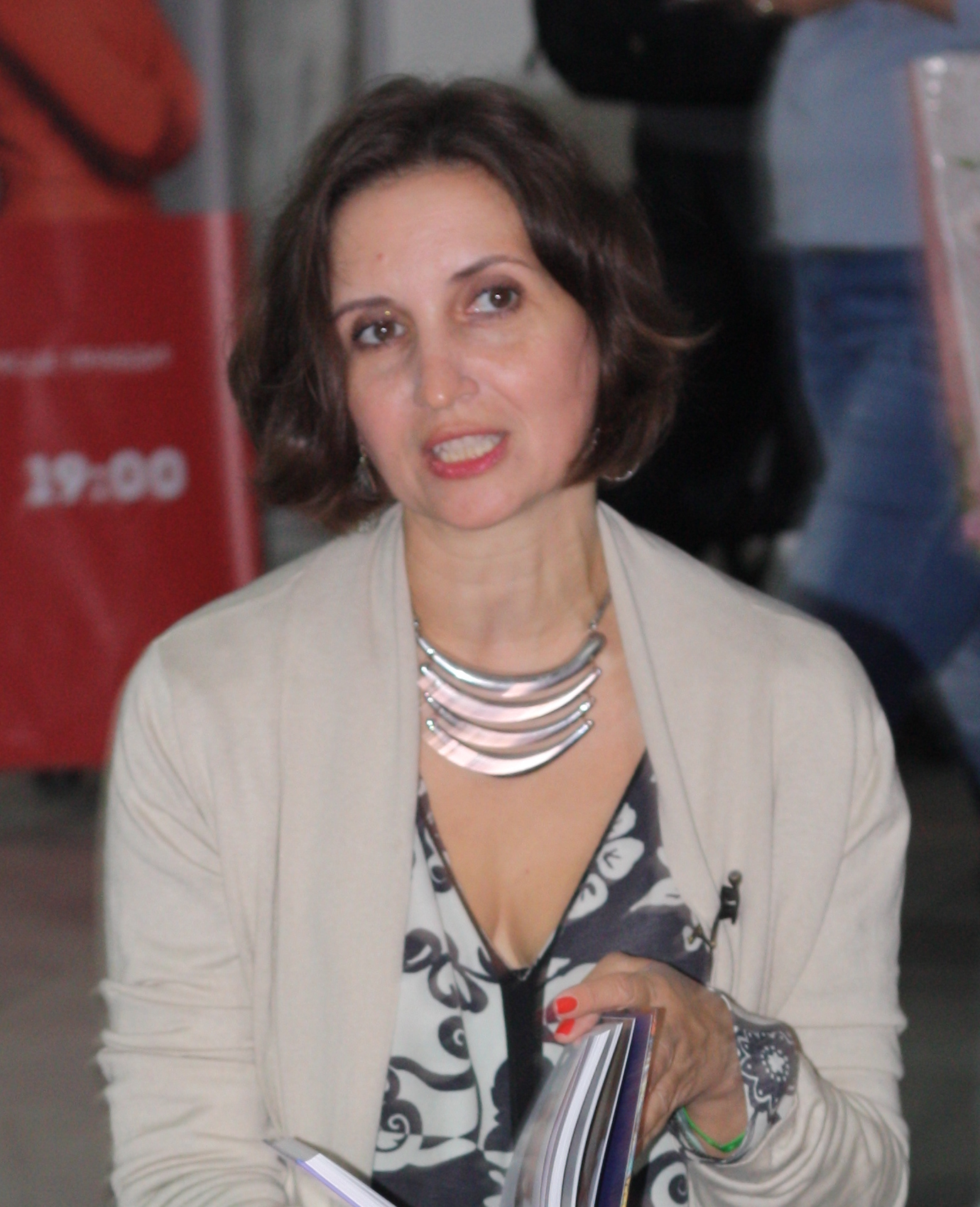
- Maryana Savka on Publishers' Forum in Lviv 2017, by Сергій Липко
- Genre: poetry; children's literature
- Notable awards: Vasyl Stus Award

Mariana Savka, also spelled Maryana Savka (born 21 February 1973 in Kopychyntsi) is a Ukrainian poet, children's writer, translator and a publisher. In 2003 she was awarded the Vasyl Stus Award.

== Early life and education ==
Mariana Savka was born on 21 February 1973 in Kopychyntsi. Her father, Orest Savka, was a theater director and an activist. Mariana holds a degree in Ukrainian studies from the Ivan Franko National University of Lviv. During her studies, she co-created an all-female literary group ММЮННА ТУГА with Marianna Kiyanovska, Natalka Sniadanko and others. She also studied at the drama studio of the Les Kurbas Theatre in Lviv.

== Career ==
She worked as a researcher at the Stefanyk National Science Library which led to her publishing a work on Ukrainian emigrant press in the First Czechoslovak Republic. In the 1990s she also contributed to the literature section of the Postup daily. In 2001 she founded with her husband a publishing house called Vydavnytstvo Staroho Leva ("Old Lion’s Publishing House") which initially focused on children's and young adult literature, then expanded into literature for adults. She is the editor-in-chief of the company.

She debuted in 1995 with poetry book Оголені русла. Her works have appeared in various newspapers and magazines, such as Suchasnist`, Svitovyd, Kuryer Kryvbasu, Chetver, and the Ukrainian Quarterly, and have been featured in anthologies, including Метаморфози. Десять найкращих українських поетів останніх десятих років (Metamorphoses. Top Ten Ukrainian Poets of the Last Decade). Her works have been translated into seven languages including English, Russian and Polish. Apart from writing, Savka is also a composer and a singer in Maryanychi Trio, for which she has written over 30 songs. She also works as a translator.

Savka is s a member of PEN Ukraine and of the Council of the Center for the Study of Literature for Children and Youth. She serves as the United Nations Development Programme Tolerance Ambassador in Ukraine and is the vice-president of the Big Hedgehog literary prize: the first non-governmental literary award in Ukraine dedicated to honoring authors of books for children and youth.

In 1998, Savka won in the Fackel literature competition and in 2003 she was awarded the Vasyl Stus Award.

== Publications ==
=== For children ===
- Чи є в бабуїна бабуся? (Does the Baboon Have a Grandma?), 2003
- Лапи і хвости (Paws and Tails), 2005
- Казка про Старого Лева (Fairy Tale about an Old Lion), 2011
- Босоніжки для стоніжки (Sandals for the Centipede), 2015
- На болоті (At the Swamp), 2015
- Тихі віршики на зиму (Silent Poems for Winter), 2015

=== For adults ===
- Оголені русла (Bare Channels), 1995
- Малюнки на камені (Paintings on the Stone), 1998
- Гірка мандрагора (Bitter Mandrake), 2002
- Кохання і війна (Love and War), 2002
- Квіти цмину (Strawflowers), 2006
- Бостон-джаз: візії та вірші (Boston-Jazz: Visions and Poems), 2008
- Тінь риби (Shadow of Fish), 2010
- Пора плодів і квітів (Time of Fruit and Flowers), 2013
- Листи з Литви / Листи зі Львова (Letters from Lithuania / Letters from Lviv), 2016
- Колисанки і дрімливі вірші (Lullabies and Somnolent Poems), 2017
