= Joseph Payne Brennan =

American poet

- Brennan circa. 1973
- Born: December 20, 1918; Bridgeport, Connecticut, United States
- Died: January 28, 1990 (aged 71)
- Occupations: Author, poet
- Writing career
- Years active: 1940–1990
- Genres: Horror, Fantasy, Poetry
- Notable works: Slime, Lucius Leffing series

Joseph Payne Brennan (December 20, 1918 – January 28, 1990) was an American writer of fantasy and horror fiction, and also a poet. Of Irish ancestry, he was born in Bridgeport, Connecticut and he lived most of his life in New Haven, Connecticut, and worked as an Acquisitions Assistant at the Sterling Memorial Library of Yale University for over 40 years. Brennan published several hundred short stories (estimates range between four and five hundred), two novellas and reputedly thousands of poems. His stories appeared in over 200 anthologies and have been translated into German, French, Dutch, Italian and Spanish. He was an early bibliographer of the work of H. P. Lovecraft.

Brennan's first professional sale came in December 1940 with the publication of the poem "When Snow Is Hung", which appeared in the Christian Science Monitor Home Forum, and he continued writing poetry up until the time of his death. As a fiction writer, Brennan started out writing westerns stories for the pulps, then switched to horror stories for Weird Tales in 1952. He began publishing his own magazine Macabre, which ran from 1957 to 1976. Several of his short story collections concern an occult detective named Lucius Leffing in the vein of Carnacki and Algernon Blackwood's John Silence.

His 1958 collection Nine Horrors and a Dream, containing the stories "Slime" (which has been reprinted at least fifty times) and "Canavan's Back Yard", is celebrated in an essay by Stephen Gallagher in the book Horror: 100 Best Books, edited by Stephen Jones and Kim Newman. Stephen King has called him "a master of the unashamed horror tale". Don D'Ammassa considers that "His stories were noteworthy for their effective development of suspense and terror without the excesses of violence which characterise modern horror fiction".

Brennan's personality was described in an interview as "reserved: he is friendly but not flamboyant. He is most comfortable with his wife (Doris) and his dog (Chaucer). He is a gentle, softspoken, modest man. But beware, for beneath that ordinary exterior lurks the mind of a modern master of fright."

== Life and work ==
=== Early career: 1940s: Western Stories ===
Brennan has stated in numerous autobiographical snippets that a chance encounter with the collected works of Edgar Allan Poe is what sparked his interest and ambition to engage in writing himself. Shortly after he was born in Bridgeport, CT, in 1917 (the same year of birth as his fellow Weird Tales writer Robert Bloch), Brennan's family moved back to New Haven, where he lived thereafter. He was forced to drop out of college in his sophomore year owing to an illness in the family; thus, he was largely self-educated. He then took a position in the advertising department at The New Haven Journal-Courier (1937–1939).

Little is known about how Brennan went about submitting his early manuscripts, although Brennan used many different agents in the course of his career. Before and during World War II, Ulrich Troubetzkoy acted as his de facto agent as well as the guardian of his manuscripts while he was stationed overseas. Later he used, with varying degrees of rapport and success, Laurence R. D'Orsay, Jack Schaffner, the Scott Meredith Literary Agency, Kirby McCauley, Kenneth S. White and R. Dixon Smith. Troubetzkoy was born Dorothy Livingston Ulrich in Hartford, Connecticut in 1914, and known professionally as Ulrich Troubetzkoy after her 1941 marriage to Prince Serge Troubetzkoy; she met Brennan when they both worked at the New Haven Journal-Courier in the late 1930s.

Recognized editors of his work include Dorothy McIlwraith, Frank Belknap Long, Charles L. Grant, Peter Haining, Helen Hoke, Robert Arthur, Les Daniels, August Derleth, Ruth Iodice, Lilith Lorraine, Gustav Davidson, F. E. S. Finn, Stuart David Schiff], Gerald W. Page, George Abbe, and Loring Williams.

Brennan began working at the Yale University Library in 1941; this was interrupted by military duty in the U.S. Army where he served three years (including one year with General Patton's Third Army in the 26th Infantry Division (United States) ("Yankee Division")), during which time he received a unit citation of five battle stars, including one for the Battle of the Bulge. Brennan resumed work at Yale in 1946 and began to write and publish western-themed short fiction for the pulp markets. His debut pulp western appearance occurred in December 1948 with the yarn "Fast-Gun Freedom", in Western Short Stories. Brennan made his first professional fiction sale with the western yarn "Endurance", which appeared in Masked Rider Western (Feb 1950). A total of 26 western yarns by him can be found in 25 pulp titles.

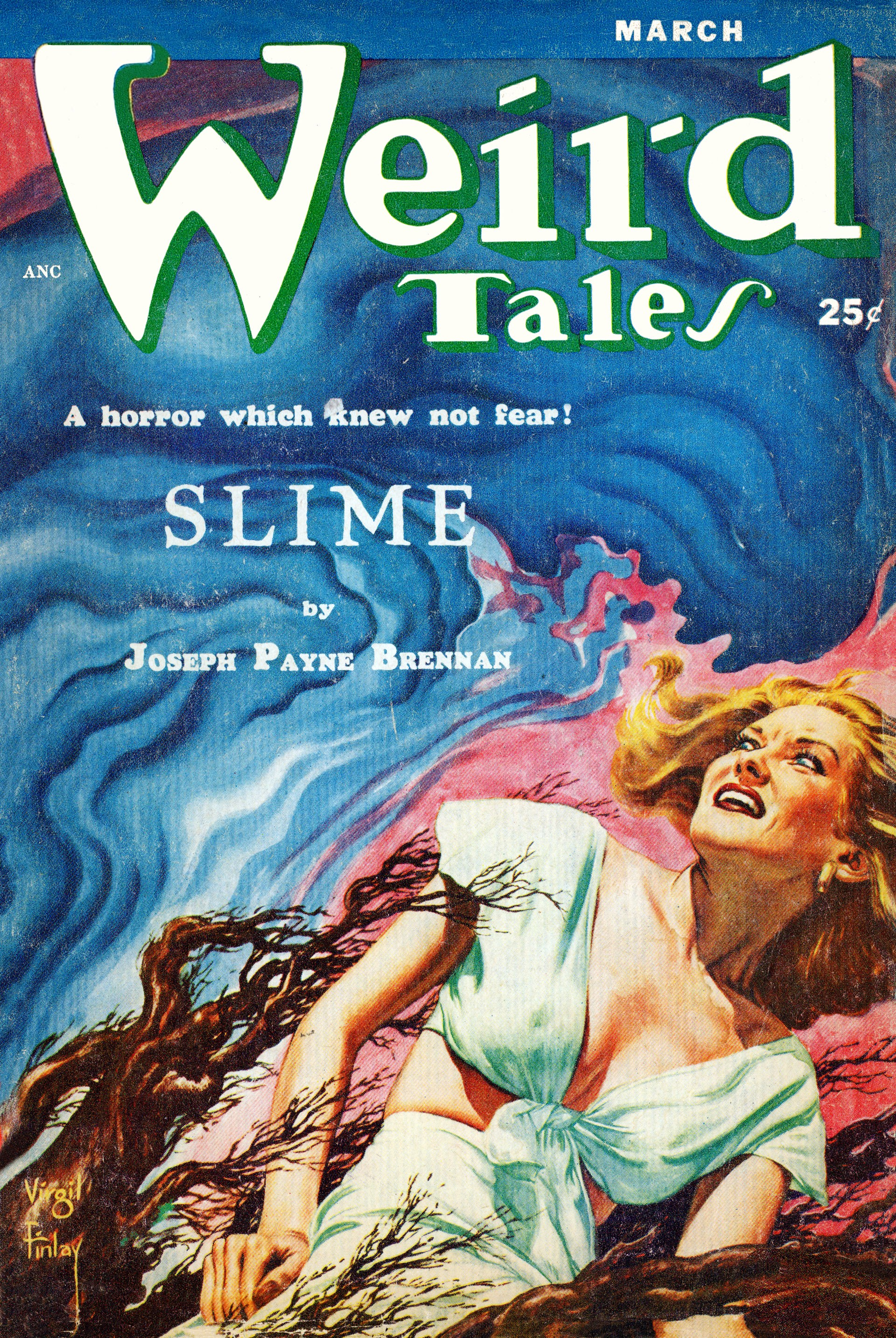
Brennan's novelette "Slime" was the cover story in the March 1953 Weird Tales

=== 1950s: Poetry and supernatural work ===
When the market for western fiction dried up in the mid-1950s, Brennan simply turned his hand to the supernatural.

In 1950 Brennan established the little poetry journal Essence, which was published irregularly, with 47 issues spanning a period of 28 years (1950–1977). Among the many poets who contributed over the years were George Abbe, Duane Ackerson, Doris Philbrick Brennan, Judson Crews, August Derleth, Alan Donovan, Alfred Dorn, Janet Fox (Scavenger's Newsletter), Skip Galloway, Joseph Joel Keith, Lilith Lorraine, Joseph Francis Murphy, Rebecca Newth, William J. Noble, Lori Petri, Dorothy Quick, Sydney King Russell, Wade Wellman (son of Manly Wade Wellman), Mary Winter, and Celeste Turner Wright. Also included were reprints of the work of David Park Barnitz, Arthur Rimbaud, and others. Brennan was on the staff of Jack Schaefer's Theatre News for the year 1940.

His first book, Heart of Earth, also issued in 1950, was a collection of poems.

That same year Frank Belknap Long wrote to Brennan suggesting that they meet, because Long was going to stay at Short Beach following his mother's death. The environs of Yale University were closely bound up with Long's ancestral heritage - his maternal forebears the Manfields were among the city's earliest settlers, and this gave him much in common with Brennan. Long's intention was to discuss with Brennan the antiquities of New Haven, their mutual interest in H.P. Lovecraft and writing in general. This meeting did not occur, but they did meet at a later time in a restaurant opposite Yale University Campus. Long and Brennan would not meet again until the time of the First World Fantasy Convention (1975 in Providence).

Brennan belatedly appeared on the pages of Weird Tales with the short-short "The Green Parrot" in the July 1952 issue of that magazine, to which Brennan became a regular contributor. In fairly quick succession this tale was followed up by his novelette "Slime", the dark whimsy "On The Elevator", and "The Calamander Chest". These tales appeared only months before the magazine's demise deprived him of a professional market for any further such fiction. Much later Brennan was also collected in the Zebra Books revival of the magazine, Weird Tales #2, with the Leffing case "The Nursing Home Horror", retitled "Fear".

=== Late 1950s and 1960s: Macabre House, Macabre magazine and Arkham House ===
In 1955 Brennan tried his hand at a new endeavour, and his imprint Macabre House was launched with the publication of the pamphlet H.P. Lovecraft: An Evaluation (now incredibly scarce, like many of the other Brennan-published efforts).

Macabre House published its own magazine, Macabre. According to Donald M. Grant, "together with its companion magazine, Essence, it (Macabre) provided the opportunity and the encouragement for publication of poems and stories by writers seeking recognition in a period that lacked a vehicle for development. Macabre ran for 23 issues and just shy of 20 years; issues are prized collector's items. Macabre was founded in 1957 to "work for the revival" of Weird Tales. He also wanted Macabre to "serve as a rallying place for all those devoted to horror and the supernatural". Twenty three issues were released, the last one in 1976. Issues of Macabre included Brennan's "Lucius Leffing" stories, and well as other of his well-known stories and articles on H. P. Lovecraft": "Time and Lovecraft" and "Lovecraft on the Subway". The ninth issue (Summer 1961) also featured an article on H.P. Lovecraft by Brennan. Other contributions included "Wei-Thogga" by Mike Ambrose, "Ice People" by George Dendrinos, "Balthor the Dreamer" by W. Paul Ganley, "The Floating Coffin" by John Perry, and "Day of Departure" by Frank Sherry. Other contributors include Ramsey Campbell, Robert Caspar, Lawrence R. Griffin, Helen T. Hill, Leslie Nelson Jennings, Lilith Lorraine, Joseph Francis Murphy, William J. Noble, Violet Hiles Ringer, Richard L. Tierney, Lawrence A. Trissel, and Elizabeth Weistrop. Several stories in Macabre have been cited as essential to Lovecraft's Cthulhu Mythos.

The Macabre House imprint also published most of Brennan's horror fiction in the 1950s to early 1970s, such as the volumes The Dark Returners (1959), Scream at Midnight (1963) and The Casebook of Lucius Leffing (1973).

August Derleth had been an early correspondent and so Brennan sought publication for his first fiction collection with Arkham House; Derleth assembled this volume as Nine Horrors and a Dream (1958). Arkham House would later publish one of his volumes of poetry, Nightmare Need (1964) and Brennan's fifth volume of supernatural tales, Stories of Darkness and Dread (1973). Additionally, the 1961 poetry collection Wind of Time was issued by Derleth under the Hawk and Whippoorwill Press imprint, a subsidiary of Arkham House. As early as 1961, Brennan had more entries than any other poet in Derleth's anthology Fire and Sleet and Candlelight - fourteen poems. Stefan Dziemanowicz has written that "his volumes Nightmare Need and Creep to Death rank as high watermarks of modern macabre verse".

Brennan was repeatedly turned down for grants to help produce and sustain his "little" magazines, Essence and Macabre. These two outlets were carried on for decades by his own determination and the assistance of numerous private contributions. The only organization to contribute substantially was the Virginia Humanities Foundation, through the auspices of Margaret Haley Carpenter [1917-1985], and Nan Cooke Carpenter.

=== Lucius Leffing (occult detective) series ===
In the tradition of the psychic or paranormal detective, Brennan introduced his character Lucius Leffing, a sarsaparilla-sipping occultist private detective and psychic investigator, who resides at Number 7 Autumn St, New Haven, and collects antique glass. The character first appeared in the story "The Haunted Housewife" (Macabre XII, Winter 1962–1963). Leffing was quoted, and briefly appeared at the end of the story "In The Very Stones" which appeared in Scream At Midnight (1963). Macabre published two more of his adventures ("Apparition in the Sun", and "In Death as in Life") before the series began to run in Alfred Hitchcock Mystery Magazine and Mike Shayne Mystery Magazine, where a further thirteen tales appeared prior to the 1973 publication of The Casebook of Lucius Leffing.

The stories comprising the Lucius Leffing canon are akin to the Holmes and Watson stories of Conan Doyle, and to the Pons and Parker stories of August Derleth. In the stories, Leffing's adventures are chronicled by his protege and friend - Brennan himself. Three collections of Leffing stories, plus the novel Act of Providence (in which Leffing investigates the bizarre happenings at the First World Fantasy Convention) include all the stories in the series. Stefan Dziemianowicz has pointed out how Leffing's status as a psychic detective changed over time: "Leffing began life as a psychic detective, but after his third escapade, Brennan felt compelled to minimize the supernatural content of the stories to ensure their acceptance in the mystery/detective magazines. With the revival of the horror market in the 1980s, Leffing turned ghostbuster once again - a career move that mirrors Brennan's own resurrection in the horror mainstream following his years of exile in the small press".

Frank Belknap Long explains that while there had been occult detectives before, "Lucius Leffing is in all respects unique. He seldom engages in dramatic confrontations on a mundane human plane, and he does not shout at the reader, his clients, or anyone else. But in his scholarly reserve and quietness there is a sagacity of a high order, a brilliance that blazes and sears and shatters the horrific as if it were a vessel of glass with the deadly precision of a rapier thrust. He has a comforting way with clients who come to him for help, for he is wise enough to know that the most fatal error a victim of dark and mysterious forces can make is to doubt his own sanity at the start. He questions nothing that he has been told until every aspect of a strangeness has been explored in depth."

=== 1970s ===
In 1970, Brennan married the former Doris M. Philbrick, who was herself a published poet. Three of her poems are included in Brennan's volume Creep to Death (1981). He also became a member of the Praed Street Irregulars, a society founded by fellow author, Sherlockian and publisher Luther Norris in honor of August Derleth's sleuth Solar Pons.

A second collection of Leffing tales, containing eight stories, was published in 1977 as Chronicles of Lucius Leffing. The introduction to this volume by Frank Belknap Long recounts his several meetings with Brennan over the years. Long says of Brennan that he was a "storyteller of exceptional gifts who trusts his own creation right up to the hilt" and that "no present-day writer of fantasy conforms, in quite so miraculous a way, to the most fascinating of literary legends - that of the cultivated poet-philosopher-scholar who explores literature's most adventurous byways, in thrall to the darkly mysterious and the subtly terrifying".

The 1978 poetry collection As Evening Advances was a slim chapbook containing 31 poems including two reprints ("The Old Man," first collected in Nightmare Need and originally appearing in The New York Herald Tribune (1959); and "Maelstrom of Stars," first collected in The Wind of Time (1961) and originally appearing in The New York Times [1960]). The balance of content was reprinted from various horror genre fanzines, mainstream poetry journals, or original to the collection.

Brennan was the first recipient of the International Clark Ashton Smith Poetry Award 1978 for Life Achievement. (This award was created by Frederick J. Mayer and awarded yearly at the Fantasy Faire Convention in Southern California until the passing of co-founder William "Bill" Crawford in 1985).

The third Lucius Leffing book was the short novel Act of Providence (1979), set in and around the events of the First World Fantasy Convention, convened in Providence, Rhode Island, on Halloween weekend 1975.

=== 1980s ===
In 1980, twelve of Brennan's classic horror stories were collected in the paperback-only collection The Shapes at Midnight, with an introduction by Stephen King.

The 1981 poetry collection Creep to Death assembled an even-handed blend of 84 poems by Brennan, many culled from the pages of Essence and Macabre, and various contemporary semi-pro genre magazines of the day, including Bleak December, Cross Plains, Myrddin, Nyctalops, Weirdbook, Whispers, and the one-off collaboration Toadstool Wine (1975). The collection concludes with a brief showcase (three poems) by his wife, Doris Philbrick Brennan. The author biography to this volume indicates that Brennan was assembling work for five further volumes, several of which eventuated. Two did not - these were Make Mine Macabre, a collection drawn from the author's pioneer magazine Macabre; and Lucius Leffing, Supernatural Sleuth, the collected supernatural adventures of his favourite detective.

In 1982, the short hardboiled detective novel Evil Always Ends made its hardcover debut at the 1982 World Fantasy Convention, at which tribute was paid to Brennan as Guest of Honor. Brennan also won the Convention Award at this convention, along with Roy Krenkel.

In 1984, Twilight Zone magazine featured a seven-page spread of Brennan's poems with illustrations—probably the largest such periodical coverage in the history of the fantastic poetry genre.

1985's poetry collection Sixty Selected Poems represents the gamut of Brennan's poetic work, from poems published in his first collection up until the date of publication.

Nineteen eighty-six saw the publication of The Borders Just Beyond, a collection of 24 macabre stories.

=== Death ===
Brennan died, aged 70, a few months prior to the issuance of his fourth Leffing book, the third collection of short stories to feature the character. The Adventures of Lucius Leffing (1990) contains another 13 adventures of the psychic sleuth.

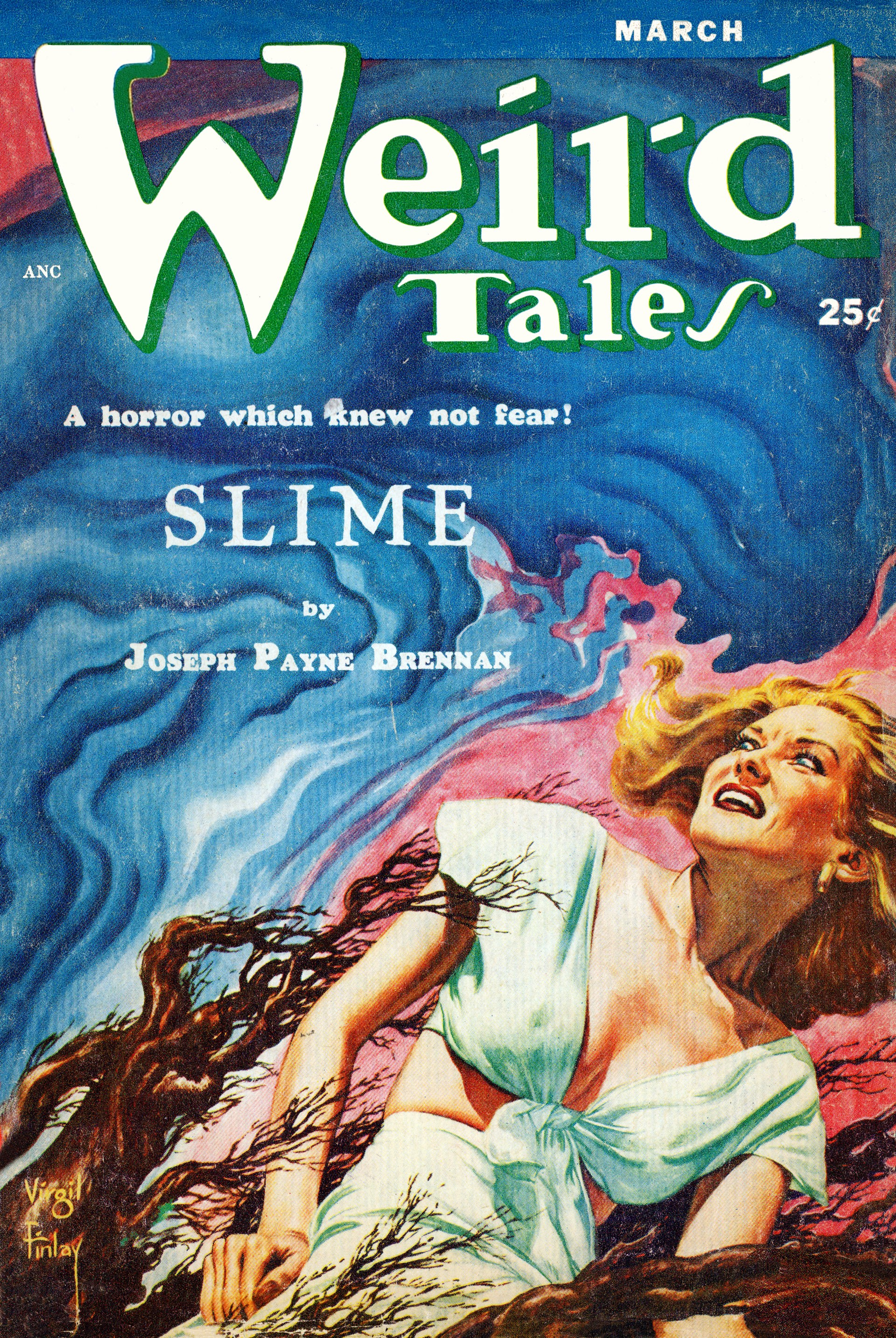
"Slime" is Joseph Payne Brennan's best-known story.

== Common themes and legacy ==
Almost all of Brennan's work takes place in or around New England, especially coastal and northwestern Connecticut. Many of Brennan's best tales are set within the environs of New Haven and East Hartland, some within the mythical New England town of Juniper Hill, and feature seemingly semi-autobiographical elements throughout. He often goes to great lengths describing vast stretches of forest, scenery, small towns, and so on. His characters are often reclusive, and stick to these desolate places. As Alan Warren points out, many of Brennan's tales involve ghosts or apparitions that make frightening, unexpected appearances in old houses, hospital rooms, or even, as in 'The Man in Grey tweeds", on the highway.

In his poetry, he himself identified his main themes as "death, loss, the mystery of time, Nature".

Critics have varied in their responses to Brennan's output. Alan Warren considers that almost singlehandedly, he continued the Weird Tales tradition of well-wrought and atmospheric Gothic horror that seemed moribund for many years until Stephen King, and others employing many of the same methods, arrived on the scene. Warren credits Brennan with being able to put the horror right in front of the reader's face and suggests that "part of this is due to Brennan's simple style: his horrors are vivid because they stand out in sharp relief, against his homespun, small-town scenes." For Warren, "Brennan's tales often succeed because they are written with conviction, deliberately understated, and are often genuinely frightening."

Stephen King notes in his appreciative introduction to Shapes at Midnight: "you will find nothing flashy in his work...Brennan writes in what E.L. White called 'the plain style', a style which is as modest and self-effacing as Joe Brennan is himself...but for all of that, it is a sturdy style, capable of wielding enormous power when it is used well."

By contrast, S. T. Joshi writes that Brennan has "the ability to devise a clever supernatural idea but an utter deficiency of literary talent to execute it competently. The hallmark of Brennan's work is an almost childishly simple, unadorned prose that might be thought to facilitate the subtle incursion of the weird; but in reality this flatness of style renders his conceptions preposterous and absurd because of an insufficiency of atmospheric preparation." Joshi does consider that "Brennan is probably a better poet than a fiction writer, and his simplicity of utterance can be highly effective in short, pungent poems of fantasy and terror. Arkham House's Nightmare Need (1964) is well worth seeking out, as is the later Sixty Selected Poems (1985)."

Stefan Dziemanowicz comments of the collection Nine Horrors and a Dream that "All the stories in the book are notable for their simple, unaffected style, and their depiction of ordinary suburban and rural people contending with eruptions of the supernatural in their everyday lives." He concludes that "The timeless themes of his weird tales made him an important bridge between the pulp and the modern horror era. He was also a pioneer in horror's specialty press phenomenon".

== Works ==
- Heart of Earth. (Prairie City, Illinois: The Decker Press, 1950); [James A. Decker]. Verse.
- Essence. (New Haven, Connecticut: The Author). Poetry journal, 1950 - 1977, 47 issues, I - XLVII.
- A Select Bibliography of H. P. Lovecraft. (N.P.: The Author, 1952); expanded edition as H. P. Lovecraft: A Bibliography. (Washington, D.C.: Biblio Press, 1952). revised edition as H.P. Lovecraft: A Bibliography (Madison, WI: The Strange Company, 1977)
- The Humming Stair. (Denver, Colorado: Big Mountain Press, 1953); [Alan Swallow]. Verse.
- H. P. Lovecraft: An Evaluation. (New Haven, Connecticut: Macabre House, 1955). 75 copies issued. (essay is reprinted in Peter Cannon, ed. Lovecraft Remembered.(Sauk City, Wisconsin: Arkham House, 1998).
- Macabre. (New Haven, Connecticut: The Author). Fiction and poetry journal, 1957 - 1976, 23 issues, I - XXIII.
- "20,000 Feet Over History". (American Airlines, 1958).
- Nine Horrors and a Dream (Sauk City, Wisconsin: Arkham House, 1958). August Derleth. (New York, NY: Ballantine Books, [rpt]., 1962).
- The Dark Returners. (New Haven, Connecticut: Macabre House, 1959); [Donald M. Grant]. Limited to 150 signed & numbered copies; not issued in d.j.
- The Wind of Time. (Place of Hawks, Sauk City, Wisconsin: Hawk & Whippoorwill Press, 1961); [August Derleth]. Verse.
- Scream at Midnight. (New Haven, Connecticut: Macabre House, 1963); [Donald M. Grant]. 250 copies; not issued in d.j. Four stories from this volume are reprinted in Stories of Darkness and Dread. (1973)
- Nightmare Need (Sauk City, Wisconsin: Arkham House, 1964); [August Derleth].
- A Sheaf of Snow Poems. (Hamden, Connecticut: Pendulum Press, 1973). Verse.
- The Casebook of Lucius Leffing. (New Haven, Connecticut: Macabre House, 1973); published by Donald M. Grant.
- Stories of Darkness and Dread. (Sauk City, Wisconsin: Arkham House, 1973); [August Derleth].
- Death Poems. (Grand Rapids, Michigan: Pilot Press Books, 1974); [L. Eric Greinke]. Verse.
- Edges of Night. (Grand Rapids, Michigan: Pilot Press Books, 1974); [L. Eric Greinke]. Verse.
- The Chronicles of Lucius Leffing. (West Kingston, Rhode Island: Donald M. Grant, Publisher, Inc., 1977). Introduction by Frank Belknap Long.
- The Riddle. (Warren, Ohio: Fantome Press (C. M. James), 1977. Poem; chapbook. 75 copies printed.
- As Evening Advances. (Huntsville, Alabama: Crystal Visions Press, 1978); [Charles W. Melvin]. Limited to 400 numbered copies. Verse.
- Webs of Time. (New Haven, Connecticut: Macabre House, 1979); 500 copies. Introduction by Frederick J. Mayer.
- Act of Providence. (Co-authored with Donald M. Grant). West Kingston, Rhode Island: Donald M. Grant, Publisher, Inc., 1979. A Lucius Leffing novel. 1200 trade hardcover copies, with a deluxe slipcased edition of 250 copies signed by the authors & illustrator.
- The Shapes of Midnight. (New York, New York: Berkley Books, 1980). Introduction by Stephen King. Abridged reprint (New York: Dover Books, 2019) omits "Canavan's Back Yard" and "Slime"; also omits Stephen King's introduction.
- Creep to Death. (West Kingston, Rhode Island: Donald M. Grant, 1981). Verse.
- Evil Always Ends. (West Kingston, Rhode Island: Donald M. Grant, 1982). Limited to 750 copies signed by both author and artist. Short supernatural detective novella, released to commemorate Brennan's appearance as a Guest of Honor at the 1982 World Fantasy Convention.
- Sixty Selected Poems. (Amherst, New York: The New Establishment Press, 1985); [W. Paul Ganley].
- The Borders Just Beyond. (West Kingston, Rhode Island: Donald M. Grant, 1986). Collection of 24 weird short stories. Limited to 750 copies signed by the author (but not by the illustrator, Randy Broecker).
- Look Back on Laurel Hills. (Minneapolis, Minnesota: Jwindz Publishing, 1989); [Dwayne H. Olson]. Verse.
- The Adventures of Lucius Leffing. (Hampton Falls, New Hampshire: Donald M. Grant, 1990). Limited to 1000 copies numbered and signed by both author and artist). Introduction by Jack L. Chalker.
- The Feaster From Afar: The Selected Weird Tales of Joseph Payne Brennan, Volume One. Rio Rancho, NM: Midnight House, 2008. Edited by Stefan Dziemianowicz and John Pelan. This was to have been a four-volume set of Brennan's tales, but Midnight House (as of 2015) has published no further volumes in the series.

== Radio, television, and film ==
- Thriller [Television adaptation], aired 16 April 1962. The Lethal Ladies episode presented "Good-Bye, Mr. Bliss" as "Good-Bye, Dr. Bliss", and "The Pool" as "Murder On The Rocks". Thriller also considered using "Apprehension" but apparently determined that it would be difficult to effectively adapt to performance media.
- Tales from the Darkside [Television adaptation, 1984], presented "Levitation".
- Italiana Radio Televisione adapted the stories, "The Calamander Chest", "The House On Stillcroft Street", "Levitation", and "Long Hollow Swamp" for broadcast in 1982.
- "Zombique" was adapted for radio and presented on THE HITCHCOCK HALF-HOUR airing on South African Broadcasting, 1981.
- "The Calamander Chest" was recorded by Caedmon Educational Recordings in 1978 with a performance by Vincent Price. This tale is Side 2 on the LP recorded album (or "B" side on cassette) The Goblins At The Bathhouse, which is the title of Ruth Manning-Sanders tale on the "A" side. This tale was also recorded by Houghton-Mifflin in 1973 for the Mystery Stories Listening Library, as a companion format to MYSTERY STORIES 1, edited by James Higgins. This recording can be accessed at Video on YouTube
- Supposedly, Brennan was recorded reading selected poems ("Heart of Earth"; "Black October"; "When Yellow Leaves"; "Return of the Young Men"; "The Closer Light"; and "Lines To H. P. Lovecraft") during a "Meet The Authors" gathering at the First World Fantasy Convention held in Providence, Rhode Island, October 31 - November 2, 1975. Thus far this is unsubstantiated.
- Brennan was recorded as part of a panel discussion with several other authors at the First World Fantasy Convention, 1975. Some of this discussion appeared that year on a flexi-disc inserted into the fanzine Myrddin 3. The full recording can be accessed at

== Awards ==
- Hartshorne Award for 1957. Wisconsin Poetry Magazine.
- Leonora Speyer Memorial Award 1961, for "New England Vignette". The Poetry Society of America.
- International Clark Ashton Smith Poetry Award 1978, (first recipient) awarded for Life Achievement. (An award created by Frederick J. Mayer and awarded yearly at the Fantasy Faire Convention in Southern California until the passing of co-founder William "Bill" Crawford in 1985).
- At the Eighth World Fantasy Convention 1982, held in Brennan's home town of New Haven, Connecticut, Brennan was awarded a Special Convention Award for Life Achievement, along with artist/illustrator, Roy Krenkel. The winner of the Life Achievement Award for 1982 went to Italo Calvino.
- Brennan received numerous awards in poetry from various literary journals including Kaleidograph, and others.

== See also ==
- List of horror fiction writers
