= Nightmare Need =

Book by Joseph Payne Brennan

- Jacket illustration by Frank Utpatel for Nightmare Need
- Author: Joseph Payne Brennan
- Cover artist: Frank Utpatel
- Language: English
- Genre: Poetry
- Publisher: Arkham House
- Publication date: 1964
- Publication place: United States
- Media type: Print (Hardback)
- Pages: 69 pp

Nightmare Need is a collection of poems by Joseph Payne Brennan. It was released in 1964 by Arkham House in an edition of 500 copies. The book was printed and published in England by Villiers Publications Ltd for Arkham House and lacks the distinctive gold printing on black binding of most Arkham House publications.

== Contents ==
Nightmare Need contains the following poems:

1. "The Old Man With Tarnished Eyes"
2. "The Gods Return"
3. "Return of the Young Men"
4. "The Guest"
5. "Demon's Wood"
6. "The Humming Stair"
7. "A Chinese Fable"
8. "The Snow Wish"
9. "Poems Unpleasant"
10. "How Shall I Speak of Stored Intemperate Terrors?"
11. "The Old Man"
12. "The Leopard"
13. "The Man With a Pear"
14. "The Wild Boars"
15. "An Hour After Midnight"
16. "Atavism"
17. "Confederate Cemetery, 1961"
18. "Spruce Stump"
19. "When Yellow Leaves"
20. "Undertakers"
21. "Grandmother's Parlour"
22. "Mad Lines"
23. "Interment for the Atom Age"
24. "On Desolate Streets"
25. "Forest Fantastique"
26. "In the Night's Cold Passage"
27. "Epitaph"
28. "Suicide"
29. "Somewhere on the Sapphire Winds"
30. "Grandfather's Ghost"
31. "Nightmare: The Arena"
32. "One Winter Afternoon"
33. "The Scythe of Dreams"
34. "The Knowing Heart"
35. "The Black Rent"
36. "The Secret Cage"
37. "Your God of Harps"
38. "Heart of Earth"
39. "The Eyes"
40. "The Dead Reach Out"
41. "Desolation"
42. "The Wind of Time"
43. "Dreamland"
44. "Wraith on the Wind"
45. "Resurrected Skull"
46. "The Grey Horror"
47. "Nocturne Macabre"
48. "Black October"
49. "The White Huntress"
50. "The Silent Houses"
51. "Rehearsal"
52. "The Cold Corridors"
53. "The Chestnut Roasters"
54. "Riddle"
