= The Heralds =

1973 novel by Brian Killick

- First edition cover
- Author: Brian Killick
- Cover artist: John Lawrence
- Language: English
- Genre: Comedy, Mystery
- Published: 1973 Hamish Hamilton
- Publication place: United Kingdom
- Media type: Print (hardback)
- Pages: 191 pages
- ISBN: 0-241-02415-3
- OCLC: 903282
- Dewey Decimal: 823/.9/14
- LC Class: PZ4.K482 He PR6061.I36

The Heralds is a novel written by Brian Killick in 1973. It is a fictional account of the inner workings of the College of Arms in London. The book follows the exploits of the college's members after the announcement that the current Garter Principal King of Arms will be retiring.

== Plot summary ==
The book begins with a brief introduction describing the lasting nature of the College of Arms through successive monarchs and governments. Immediately, though, the book shifts its focus to the current set of officers of arms at the college. At the end of the first chapter, Garter Principal King of Arms–the head of the body of heralds – announces his intended retirement from the post in six months time.

The announcement by Garter throws the entire College of Arms into confusion. Set in the late 1960s, the retiring King of Arms had led the college since the end of World War II. Each of the other, twelve officers of arms in ordinary begins calculating his own chances of promotion to the top spot. Some continue about their own business, knowing that their dutiful service will be rewarded, however, Cecil Gascoigne, who is Chester Herald, decides he will stop only short of murder in obtaining the coveted office.

Slowly, but surely, Cecil Gascoigne begins eliminating his competitors. His methods are diverse, and include devising for a colleague to be caught smuggling illegal substances into England; also using blackmail and bankruptcy to his advantage. Over time, Gascoigne begins grasping that unfortunate problems have befallen his fellow officers, and he is not the cause. Thinking that his competition has him on a list for elimination, Gascoigne begins doubling his efforts; by book's end, four officers of arms have died, and the rest disgraced.

As Cecil Gascoigne awaits the inevitable appointment as Garter King of Arms, he is arrested for an arson at the College of Arms that he did not commit. With his staff depleted and the college demoralised, Garter King of Arms decides to shoulder the burden and continue on in his duties.

== Characters ==
The vast majority of the plot revolves around the thirteen ordinary officers of arms at the college. There are many secondary characters that play minor parts, including the other tenants in Cecil Gascoigne's building, two Polish doormen at the College of Arms, various secretaries, and a mysterious former officer of arms known as Phantom Norroy and Ulster.

=== Garter King of Arms ===
Garter Principal King of Arms is described as a man of great character who was the guiding force behind the College of Arms during World War II. It was this man who kept the college going with a depleted staff. Following the war, he was rewarded with an appointment as Garter King of Arms. It was at a low point in the history of the college that Garter assumed control, and having rebuilt the staff of officers, he has prepared to retire. This retirement sets of the series of events that provide the story line.

=== Chester Herald ===
Cecil Gascoigne is the only officer at the college whose name is given. It is Chester Herald who makes it his life's work to reach the pinnacle of the world of English heraldry. As is expected of every herald, Gascoigne made a thorough search of his genealogy at his appointment. It was then that he discovered his family's original name was 'Gaskin' and that it had been changed to appear more noble. Gascoigne's mother had died when he was young, and his father was a drunkard who caroused with loose women. Gascoigne is personally responsible for the disgrace or death of several of his colleagues. His demise is at book's end, when arrested on suspicion of arson.

=== Clarenceux King of Arms ===
Clarenceux King of Arms is presented in The Heralds as the favourite to succeed to the post of Garter. Clarenceux King of Arms went off to World War II having already secured the second most senior post at the college. After the war, he assumed that he would be promoted to the top spot. Having been passed over, he assumes that the position will be his this time around. He is a very wealthy individual and has a house on Belgrave Square. He maintained a large staff at the college and showered his colleagues with gifts in an attempt to get votes from them. His demise came when he failed to file his income taxes. When Cecil Gascoigne tipped off the tax services of the problem, Clarenceux had a fatal stroke.

=== Norroy and Ulster King of Arms ===
Norroy and Ulster King of Arms is the complete opposite of Clarenceux. When word of Garter's retirement reaches the officers of arms, it is questionable if Norroy and Ulster even notices. Garter had worked hard throughout his life, and even his other colleagues took note: He became the poster child of the modern College of Arms; As well as a symbol of ability of people to work their way up; His tabards and books are bought second hand. Norroy and Ulster dies of a heart attack when a mob swamps the College of Arms.

== Major themes ==
In this novel, Brian Killick takes the reader on a journey into the secret inner politics of the herald's college. This is a world that few people have entered, and Killick's interpretation creates some very interesting personalities. The book is well written, though seen as a trifle contrived. In style, The Heralds has a narrative that is not quite sequential and is similar to Heller's Catch-22. This chronological befuddlement, combined with the convention of calling heralds only by their title can be confusing, but also adds to the humour. Killick also makes clear that the apolitical College of Arms has been around for a very long time and is slow to change. The following excerpt comes from chapter nine, in which the heralds resist the installation of a telephone until the very last moment. Even when a telephone is finally brought to the college, the officers of arms refuse to plug it in.

-"I give you notice," wrote an officer [of the Society for the Preservation of Rural England], "that I am going to try and telephone you at eleven o'clock tomorrow morning. If there is no corresponding telephone at your end, that will not be my fault. My patience is exhausted."
-"Telephone and be damned!" bellowed Clarenceux.

== Allusions/references to other works ==
The plot resembles that of Roy Horniman's novel, Israel Rank (1907), on which the film, Kind Hearts and Coronets (1949), is based. In the film the anti-hero murders the six people who stand between him and succession to a Dukedom. He is wrongfully tried in the House of Lords for the murder of his mistress' husband, found guilty and sentenced to hang. On execution day a suicide note is 'found' by his mistress and he is reprieved. The high-sounding family name of the Dukedom in Kind Hearts and Coronets is D'Ascoyne and in Israel Rank it is Gascoyne. The plotter's name in The Heralds is Gascoigne.

== See also ==
- Pursuivant
