= Núria Añó =

Catalan writer (born 1973)

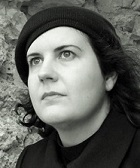
- Añó in 2009
- Born: 10 February 1973 (age 53); Lleida, Catalonia, Spain
- Occupations: Writer, novelist, biographer, essayist
- Writing career
- Language: Catalan, Spanish
- Genre: social criticism
- Notable works: The Dead Writer, Lowering Clouds, The Salon of Exiled Artists in California
- Website: nuriaanyo.com

Núria Añó (Catalan: [ˈnuɾiə əˈɲo], Spanish: [ˈnuɾja aˈɲo]; born 1973) is a Catalan writer and a translator. Añó has exhibited her work in universities and institutions giving papers on literary creation or authors like Elfriede Jelinek, Patricia Highsmith, Salka Viertel, Franz Werfel, Karen Blixen or Alexandre Dumas, fils, as well as giving talks in libraries and secondary and higher education centres. She is also a member of several international artistic juries.

== Work ==
Añó was born in Lleida, Catalonia, Spain. She started writing tales at a young age and published her first story in 1990. After that, she published in anthology books from abroad, such as the short stories 2066. Beginning the age of correction, about climate change, or Presage, about domestic violence, both translated into English.

Her first novel Els nens de l'Elisa (2006) was third among the finalists for the 24th Ramon Llull Prize for Catalan literature, one of the most relevant literary awards in Catalan language. This novel has a female main character detached from the clichés. Núria Añó draws an antiheroine through a school teacher and shows both the tender and the most sordid side.

The Dead Writer (2008) shows creating a literary work through Anna, a writer, and the world and lives of the surrounding people. It is an "insightful literary artefact" about the process of creation and how literature reflects itself within a literary work. It "suggests images capable of depicting daily scenes that often, life does not let us see." They published the original in Spain in 2008.

Lowering Clouds (2009) is a novel about mature women. Gabriele is a bisexual actress that takes a trip to the city where she spent her adolescence. Her friend Marianne is older and hardly remembers the actress, because she has Alzheimer's disease. Another friend, Silvia, must care for the grandchildren daily. Among others, it has a significant LGBT background. This novel is "a piece of real life, dissected with the razor-sharp scalpel of Añó's writing." They published it in 2009.

La mirada del fill (2012) is a novel about adoption, classic ballet dancers, and generational troubles between mothers and daughters. "Apparently understood facts, that the novel reveals at the right time, give the impression of reading a story written by scales, in which events overlap until they form a general panorama." They published it in 2012.

The Salon of Exiled Artists in California (2020) is a biography on Jewish screenwriter Salka Viertel that "gives always the voice and the word to Salka Viertel." This book is about the Berlin of the 1920s and the transition from silent to spoken film in Hollywood; the rise of Hitler and what it meant for the Jewish condition. Also, the exile of many European artists because of the Second World War, the Cold War and the witch-hunt against communism; an in-depth account of many well-known and famous personalities and their interpersonal relationships. Although Salka Viertel was an important figure in the exile, "very little has been written about her, so Núria Añó's book is a corrective."

They translated her work, which includes novels, short stories and essays, into Spanish, French, English, Italian, German, Polish, Chinese, Latvian, Portuguese, Dutch, Greek, Arabic or Romanian as well.

== Style ==
International literary journals consider Añó as one of the important contemporary authors in Catalan Literature.

Her writing style is very ambitious and risky, the author delves into the exploration of the contemporary individual, it focuses on the psychology of her characters, antiheroes avoiding Manichaeism. "The characters are the most important" in her books, "much more than the topic", due to "an introspection, a reflection, not sentimental, but feminine". Although her novels cover a multitude of topics, treat actual and socially relevant problems, injustices and poor communication between people. Frequently, the core of her stories remains unexplained, and Núria Añó asks the reader to discover the "deeper meaning" and to become involved in the events presented.

== Awards ==
In 1996, she was awarded the 18th City of Almenara Joan Fuster Prize for Fiction. In 2016, she was distinguished by the culture association Nuoren Voiman Liitto in Sysmä, Finland. Later, she won a grant at the Shanghai Writing Program, in Shanghai, China. In 2017, she was distinguished by the Baltic Centre for Writers and Translators in Visby, Sweden. Late in the fall, by International Writer's and Translators' Center of Rhodes in Greece. In 2018, she was selected for the residency Kraków UNESCO City of Literature in Poland and she won the fourth international writing award 2018 Shanghai Get-Together. In 2019, she was distinguished by IWTH in Ventspils, Latvia, and in 2020, with the International Writing Program in Beijing, China.

== Bibliography ==
=== Novels ===
- Els nens de l'Elisa; Omicron 2006 ISBN 9788496496262
- L'escriptora morta (The Dead Writer, 2020); Omicron 2008 ISBN 9788496496651
- Núvols baixos (Lowering Clouds, 2020); Omicron 2009 ISBN 9788492544288
- La mirada del fill; Abadia 2012 ISBN 9788496847774

=== Biographies ===
- El salón de los artistas exiliados en California: Salka Viertel acogió en su exilio a actores, intelectuales prominentes y personas anónimas huidas del nazismo (The Salon of Exiled Artists in California, 2020); Smashwords 2020 ISBN 9781658631631

==== Books translated into English ====
| Year | Title | ISBN |
|---|---|---|
| 2020 | The Dead Writer (novel) | ISBN 9781071533307 (ebook) ISBN 9781071536209 (paperback) |
| 2020 | Lowering Clouds (novel) | ISBN 9781071539446 (ebook) ISBN 9781071542330 (paperback) |
| 2020 | The Salon of Exiled Artists in California: Salka Viertel took in actors, prominent intellectuals and anonymous people in exile fleeing from Nazism (biography) | ISBN 9780463206126 (eBook) ISBN 9798647624079 (paperback) ISBN 9798734626528 (hardcover) |

==== Work translated into other languages ====
===== Novels =====
- The Dead Writer; 2020 ISBN 9781071533307 (ebook) ISBN 9781071536209 (paperback) (English)
- Lowering Clouds; 2020 ISBN 9781071539446 (ebook) ISBN 9781071542330 (paperback) (English)
- The Salon of Exiled Artists in California: Salka Viertel took in actors, prominent intellectuals and anonymous people in exile fleeing from Nazism; 2020 ISBN 9780463206126 (eBook) ISBN 9798647624079 (paperback) ISBN 9798734626528 (hardcover) (English)
- La escritora muerta; 2018 ISBN 9780463101407 (ebook) ISBN 9781981078950 (paperback) ISBN 9781664972032 (audiobook); ISBN 9798745284298 (hardcover) (Spanish)
- La mirada del hijo; 2019 ISBN 9780463358542 (ebook) ISBN 9781790867271 (paperback) ISBN 9798745859861 (hardcover) ISBN 9781669677871 (audiobook) (Spanish)
- Nubes bajas; 2021 ISBN 9781005245528 (eBook) ISBN 9798714881695 (paperback) ISBN 9781667007571 (audiobook) ISBN 9798445054078 (hardcover) (Spanish)
- La scrittrice morta; 2018 ISBN 9781547542710 (eBook) ISBN 9781547548248 (paperback) (Italian)
- Nuvole basse; 2018 ISBN 9781547560493 (eBook) ISBN 9781547562336 (paperback) (Italian)
- Lo sguardo del figlio; 2019 ISBN 9781071521489 (eBook) ISBN 9781071524121 (paperback) (Italian)
- A Escritora Morta; 2018 ISBN 9781547549801 (eBook) ISBN 9781547553389 (paperback) (Portuguese)
- O Olhar do Filho; 2018 ISBN 9781547546688 (eBook) ISBN 9781547548705 (paperback) (Portuguese)
- Nuvens Baixas; 2019 ISBN 9781547589388 (eBook) ISBN 9781547592494 (paperback)(Portuguese)
- Os Meninos de Elisa; 2023 ISBN 9781667458878 (eBook)(Portuguese)
- L'écrivaine morte; 2018 ISBN 9781547559886 (eBook) ISBN 9781547560745 (paperback) (French)
- Le regard du fils; 2019 ISBN 9781071501092 (eBook) ISBN 9781071503577 (paperback) (French)
- Nuages bas; 2020 ISBN 9781071556559 (eBook) ISBN 9781071561546 (paperback) (French)
- De dode schrijfster; 2019 ISBN 9781547580194 (eBook) ISBN 9781547583072 (paperback) (Dutch)
- De blik van de zoon; 2020 ISBN 9781071534496 (eBook) ISBN 9781071536483 (paperback) (Dutch)
- Tiefe Wolken; 2019 ISBN 9781071520925 (eBook) ISBN 9781071524022 (paperback) (German)
- Die tote Schriftstellerin; 2019 ISBN 9781071521731 (eBook) ISBN 9781071524190 (paperback) (German)
- Der Blick des Sohnes; 2019 ISBN 9781071504239 (eBook) ISBN 9781071511343 (paperback) (German)
- TO ΒΛΕΜΜΑ ΤΟΥ ΓΙΟΥ; 2019 ISBN 9781071518755 (eBook) ISBN 9781071523421 (paperback) (Greek)
- Η Νεκρή Συγγραφέας; 2020 ISBN 9781071526521 (eBook) ISBN 9781071530443 (paperback) (Greek)
- Χαμηλά σύννεφα; 2021 ISBN 9781667407227 (eBook) (Greek)

===== Biography =====
- The Salon of Exiled Artists in California; 2020 ISBN 9780463206126 (eBook) ISBN 979-8647624079 (paperback) (English)
- Το σαλόνι των εξόριστων καλλιτεχνών στην Καλιφόρνια; 2020 ISBN 9781071555637 (eBook) (Greek)
- Der Salon der Exilkünstler in Kalifornien; 2020 ISBN 9781071576700 (eBook) ISBN 978-1071579206 (paperback) (German)
- O Salão dos Artistas Exilados na Califórnia; 2021 ISBN 9781071590218 (eBook) ISBN 978-1667413747 (paperback) (Portuguese)
- Le salon des artistes exilés en Californie; 2021 ISBN 9781071596869 (eBook) ISBN 978-1667413754 (paperback) (French)
- Il salone degli artisti esiliati in California; 2021 ISBN 9781667410739 (eBook) ISBN 978-1667413761 (paperback) (Italian)
- De salon van artiesten in ballingschap in Californië; 2022 ISBN 9781667425467 (eBook) ISBN 9781667425504 (paperback) (Dutch)

== See also ==
- Catalan literature
- Écriture féminine
- Spanish literature
- Translation
- Literary work
