= Shota Iatashvili =

Georgian poet, prose writer, translator, and art critic (born 1966)

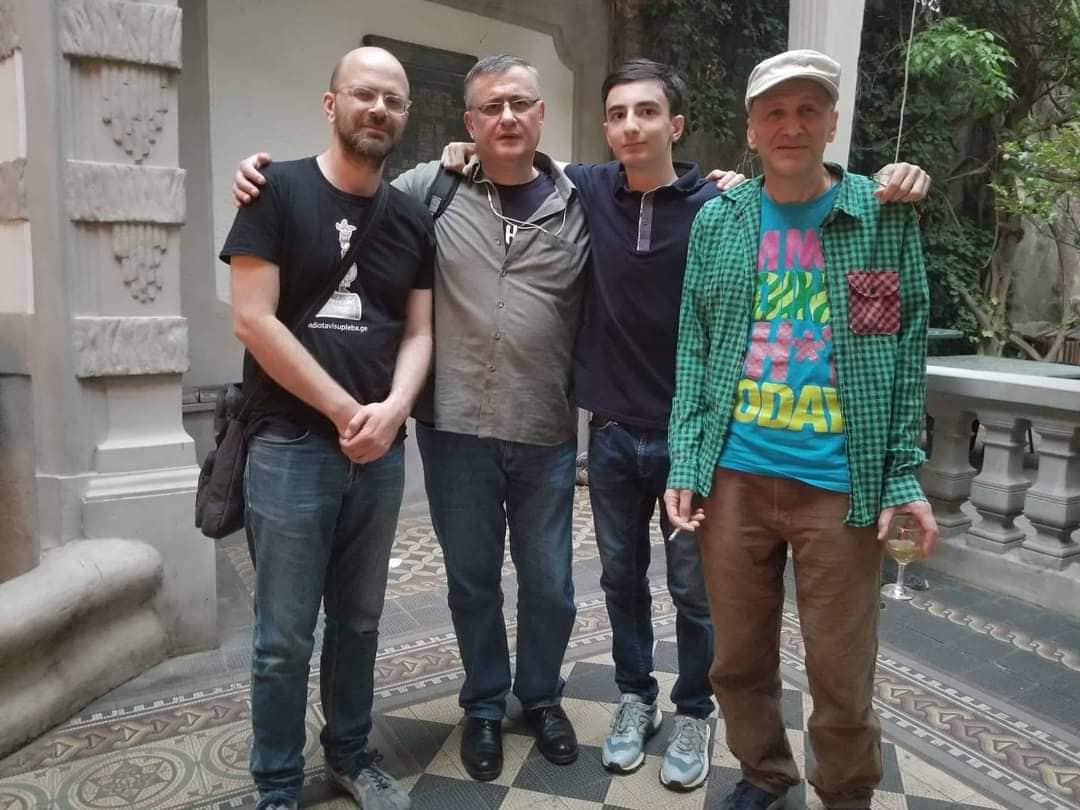
Niko Nergadze, Jimsher Rekhviashvili, Mikheil Beruashvili and Shota Iatashvili (right)

Shota Iatashvili (Georgian: შოთა იათაშვილი; born September 2, 1966) is a Georgian poet, prose writer, translator, and art critic. The winner of the "Saba" literary prize in 2005, in the nomination of the best poetry collection of the year.

== Biography ==
Shota Iatashvili was born on September 2, 1966, in Tbilisi. He graduated from the Faculty of Mechanics and Mathematics of Tbilisi State University in 1988, and in 1990 he graduated from the film directing courses of the Faculty of Public Professions. In 1989–1990, he was a mathematics teacher at the 46th secondary school. In 1990–1991, assistant director of the film studio. In 1992, he became the director of "Ibervision" TV station. In 1993, his poetic debut "Wings of Death" was published. From 1993 to 1997, he worked as an editor of the literary newspapers "Rubikon" and "Third Way". From 1994 to 1996, he was the director and actor of the Tbilisi Performance Theater; From 1995 to 1997, the editor-in-chief of "Seraphim Theater" newspaper. In 1997–2000, he was the manager of the literary section of the "Studio" magazine. Since 2003, he has been the editor of the "Caucasian House" publishing house. He is the author of 8 collections of poetry and 3 collections of short stories. His works have been translated into English, German, French, Russian, Romanian, Azerbaijani, Dutch, Portuguese, Ukrainian, Estonian, Latvian, and Albanian languages. He participated in international poetry festivals: ORIENT-OCCIDENT (Curtea de Argeș, Romania, 2006), EST-QUEST (Di, France 2006), Poetry International (Rotterdam, 2007), V and VI Poetry Biennale (Moscow, 2007, 2009), SOTZIA (Tallinn, 2008), "Poetry Days" (Riga, 2008), Киевские лавры (Kyiv, 2009) and others. He translated the works of Susan Sontag and American poets into the Georgian language.
