= Phyllis Grosskurth =

Canadian academic, writer, and literary critic (1924 – 2015)

- Born: Phyllis Marguerite Langstaff; March 16, 1924; Toronto, Ontario
- Died: August 2, 2015 (aged 91); Toronto, Ontario
- Education: Trinity College, Toronto; University of Ottawa
- Writing career
- Notable works: Elusive Subject - A Biographer's Life, 1999

Phyllis Marguerite Grosskurth OC OOnt (née Langstaff; March 16, 1924 – August 2, 2015) was a Canadian academic, writer, and literary critic.

Grosskurth was born in Toronto, Ontario, the granddaughter of physician James Miles Langstaff. She received a Bachelor of Arts honours degree in English from Trinity College, University of Toronto in 1946 and later a Master of Arts degree from the University of Ottawa. In 1962, she was awarded a doctorate by the University of London, and in addition became a Doctor of Letters at Trinity College, University of Toronto.

She published ground-breaking studies of literary/sexual and psycho-analytical subjects: firstly editing the journals of, and subsequently publishing a biography of, John Addington Symonds. This was followed by a controversial exploration of Freud and his inner circle; then a study of Melanie Klein, which was the source of a successful stage play called Mrs Klein written by Nicholas Wright. Her biography of Lord Byron, The Flawed Angel, was the first comprehensive study of the subject for a generation.

Phyllis Grosskurth was in later life professor emerita at the University of Toronto, and in 2000 was made an Officer of the Order of Canada. In 2002, she was awarded the Order of Ontario.

She first married Robert Grosskurth, with whom she had two sons and a daughter. Following their divorce she was married from 1968 to 1978 to Mavor Moore. In her later years she was married to Robert McMullan.

She died on August 2, 2015, in Toronto.

== Selected bibliography ==
- Byron: The Flawed Angel (1997)
- The Secret Ring: Freud's Inner Circle and the Politics of Psychoanalysis (1991)
- Melanie Klein: Her World and Her Work (1986), winner of the 1986 Governor General's Awards
- Havelock Ellis: A Biography (1980)
- John Addington Symonds: A Biography (1964), winner of the 1964 Governor General's Awards
