= Book of the Dead (memoir) =

2001 memoir collection by E. Hoffmann Price

Book of the Dead: Friends of Yesteryear: Fictioneers & Others
- Dust-jacket photograph by Eric Carlson for Book of the Dead
- Author: E. Hoffmann Price
- Cover artist: photograph by Eric Carlson
- Language: English
- Subject: biography
- Publisher: Arkham House
- Publication date: 2001
- Publication place: United States
- Media type: Print (Hardback)
- Pages: xxii, 423 pp
- ISBN: 0-87054-179-X
- OCLC: 46420057
- Dewey Decimal: 813/.5209 21
- LC Class: PS3566.R465 Z47 2001

Book of the Dead: Friends of Yesteryear: Fictioneers & Others is a collection of memoirs by author E. Hoffmann Price. It was published in 2001 by Arkham House in an edition of approximately 4,000 copies. The book contains memoirs of several writers of the pulp magazine era. Also included are several appreciations of Price by other authors.

== Contents ==
Book of the Dead contains the following:

1. "Introduction", by Jack Williamson
2. "Some Notes on EHP and the Book of the Dead", by Peter Ruber
3. Friends of Yesteryear: Fictioneers & Others
  - "Prologue"
  - I "Farnsworth Wright"
  - II "Otis Adelbert Kline"
  - III "Howard Phillips Lovecraft"
  - IV "Robert Ervin Howard"
  - V "Clark Ashton Smith"
  - VI "W. K. Mashburn, Jr."
  - VII "Ralph Milne Farley (Roger Sherman Hoar)"
  - VIII "Seabury Grandin Quinn"
  - IX "Hugh Doak Rankin"
  - X "The Varnished Vultures & Spider Bite"
  - XI "Barsoom Badigian"
  - XII "Harry Olmsted"
  - XIII "Albert Richard Wetjen"
  - XIV "Norbert W. Davis"
  - XV "Milo Ray Phelps"
  - XVI "William S. Bruner"
  - XVII "Henry Kuttner"
  - XVIII "August W. Derleth"
  - XIX "Edmond Hamilton"
  - "Epilogue"
4. Other Memoirs
  - "The Lovecraft Controversy: Why?", by E. Hoffmann Price
  - "Five Million Words", by Monte Linsley
  - "Seabury Quinn: An Appreciation", by E. Hoffmann Price
  - "Mortonius", by E. Hoffmann Price (about James Ferdinand Morton, Jr.)
  - "A Conversation With E. Hoffmann Price", by Gregorio Montjo
  - "One Man’s View of the Death of the Pulp Era", by E. Hoffmann Price
  - "EHP: A Bibliography", by Virgil Utter
5. Index
