= Star Wolf =

Star Wolf or Starwolf may refer to:

- Star Wolf, a 1971 science-fiction novel by Ted White
- Star Wolf, a team of mercenaries from the Star Fox series of video games.
- Star Wolf (novel series), a series of science fiction novels by American writer David Gerrold
- Star Wolf (TV series), a Japanese science fiction TV series based on the novel series
- Starwolf (novel series), a series of three novels by Edmond Hamilton

== See also ==
- Star Wolves, a real-time, futuristic video game developed by Russian video game developer X-bow Software
