= Captain Ultra (TV series) =

- Space Tokusatsu Series: Captain Ultra
- Genre: Tokusatsu
- Written by: Susumu Takaku
- Directed by: Hajime Sato
- Starring: Hirohisa Nakata; Nenji Kobayashi; Jiro Sagawa; Yuki Jono; Ichiro Izawa
- Narrated by: Hideo Murota (eps 1-2); Takeshi Kuwabara (eps 3-12); Iemasa Kayumi (eps 14-24)
- Country of origin: Japan
- Original language: Japanese
- No. of episodes: 24

Production
- Production companies: Toei Company, TBS

Original release
- Network: Tokyo Broadcasting System Television
- Release: April 16 – September 24, 1967

Captain Ultra (キャプテンウルトラ, Kyaputen Urutora) is the titular intergalactic superhero of a Japanese pulp-style tokusatsu science fiction space adventure television series titled Space Tokusatsu Series: Captain Ultra (宇宙特撮シリーズ キャプテンウルトラ, Uchū Tokusatsu Shirīzu: Kyaputen Urutora). Produced by Toei Company Ltd., the series aired on Tokyo Broadcasting System (TBS) from April 16 to September 24, 1967, with a total of 24 episodes.

This series is based very loosely on Captain Future, the pulp science fiction saga created by the influential Edmond Hamilton. This was not the only time his work was adapted in Japan: Captain Future was officially adapted into an anime series by Toei Doga in 1978, and that same year, Tsuburaya Productions adapted his Starwolf novels into a tokusatsu sci-fi action series of the same title.

Originally, this series was aired by Tokyo Broadcasting System right after the end of the original Ultraman show to serve as a filler series while Tsuburaya Productions geared up for the production of Ultra Seven. So only 24 episodes of Captain Ultra were ordered by the network. So, the week following the conclusion of Captain Ultra, Ultra Seven premiered on TBS. Still, while short-lived, the series has been released in Japan on all of the major home video formats since the 1980s: VHS, LaserDisc, and DVD. In 2005, a tankōbon volume of the original serialized manga illustrated by Shunji Obata in Shogakukan's Weekly Shōnen Sunday in 1967 was published by Manga Shop.

Captain Ultra is among the more memorable tokusatsu series from the 1960s, and was one of the three cornerstones of Toei's programs of 1967, including Akakage and Giant Robo (better known in the US as Johnny Sokko and His Flying Robot). Some Japanese fans also compare the looks of Captain Ultra to that of Captain Scarlet, the title hero of Sylvia and Gerry Anderson's Supermarionation series, Captain Scarlet and the Mysterons (which had been shown in Japan around the same time and was very popular).

The series was aired in the Takeda Hour block (sponsored by the Takeda Pharmaceutical Company).

== Characters ==
- Captain Ultra (Hirohisa Nakata) - The hero.
- Huck (Jiro Sagawa) - Captain Ultra's robot companion.
- Joe (Nenji Kobayashi) - Captain Ultra's alien friend from Planet Kikero.
- Akane (Yuki Jono) - Captain Ultra's beautiful space cadet. Has assorted secret agent gadgets.
- Kenji (Shigeru Yasunaka) - Captain Ultra's eager young boy space cadet.
- Professor Munamoto (Ichiro Izawa) - The scientific expert for the heroes.

== Episodes ==
No.	Title	Directed by	Written by	Original release date
1	"The Vandel Alien Invasion" "Banderu Seijin Shūraisu" (Japanese: バンデル星人襲来す)	Hajime Sato	Susumu Takaku	April 16, 1967
2	"Space Station Crisis" "Uchū Sutēshon Kiki Ippatsu" (Japanese: 宇宙ステーション危機一発)	Hajime Sato	Norio Osada	April 23, 1967
3	"Magnetic Monster Galvan Appears" "Jishaku Kaijū Garuban Arawaru" (Japanese: 磁石怪獣ガルバンあらわる)	Akira Kashima	Susumu Takaku	April 30, 1967
4	"Primitive Monster Bull Kong Appears" "Genshi Kaijū Buru Kongu Arawaru" (Japanese: 原始怪獣ブルコングあらわる)	Akira Kashima	Norio Osada	May 7, 1967
5	"The Vandel Titan Appears!!" "Banderu Kyojin Arawaru!!" (Japanese: バンデル巨人あらわる!!)	Koichi Takemoto	Susumu Takaku	May 14, 1967
6	"The Mysterious Woman Gebird Appears" "Kai Heiki Gebādo Arawaru" (Japanese: 怪兵器ゲバードあらわる)	Minoru Yamada	Arashi Ishizu; Minoru Yamada	May 21, 1967
7	"Primitive Monster Bull Kong's Revenge" "Genshi Kaijū Buru Kongu no Gyakushū" (Japanese: 原始怪獣ブルコングの逆襲)	Minoru Yamada	Norio Osada	May 28, 1967
8	"Two Giant Monsters Appear in a Martian City" "Nidai Kaijū Kasei Toshi ni Awawaru" (Japanese: 二大怪獣 火星都市にあらわる)	Akira Kashima	Susumu Takaku	June 4, 1967
9	"Mysterious Creature Vandel Egg Appears" "Kai Seibutsu Banderu Eggu Arawaru" (Japanese: 怪生物バンデルエッグあらわる)	Akira Kashima	Yoshitake Suzuki; Tsunehisa Ito	June 11, 1967
10	"Spy Rocket Waldar Appears!!" "Supai Roketto Warudā Arawaru!!" (Japanese: スパイロケット ワルダーあらわる!!)	Koichi Takemoto	Masaki Tsuji	June 18, 1967
11	"Fourth-Dimensional Satellite Nozlar Appears" "Shi-jigen Eisei Nozurā Arawaru" (Japanese: 四次元衛星ノズラーあらわる)	Katsuhiko Taguchi	Norio Osada	June 25, 1967
12	"Destroy the Vandel Aliens" "Banderu Seijin o Gekimetsu Seyo" (Japanese: バンデル星人を撃滅せよ)	Koichi Takemoto	Susumu Takaku	July 2, 1967
13	"Phantom Monster Ghosler Appears!!" "Maboroshi Kaijū Gōsurā Arawaru!!" (Japanese: まぼろし怪獣ゴースラーあらわる!!)	Hajime Sato	Koichiro Otsu	July 9, 1967
14	"Metal Man Metallinome Appears!!" "Kinzoku Ningen Metarinōmu Arawaru!!" (Japanese: 金属人間メタリノームあらわる!!)	Hajime Sato	Yoshi Kai	July 16, 1967
15	"Comet Monster Jaian Appears" "Kometto Kaijū Jaian Arawaru" (Japanese: コメット怪獣ジャイアンあらわる)	Koichi Takemoto	Norio Osada; Ikuro Yamazaki	July 23, 1967
16	"Thunderstorm Monster Amegon Appears!!" "Raiu Kaijū Amegon Arawaru!!" (Japanese: 雷雨怪獣アメゴンあらわる!!)	Katsuhiko Taguchi	Susumu Takaku	July 30, 1967
17	"Synthetic Monster Bakuton Appears!!" "Gōsei Kaijū Bakuton Arawaru!!" (Japanese: 合成怪獣バクトンあらわる!!)	Katsuhiko Taguchi	Toru Iguchi; Ikuro Yamazaki	August 6, 1967
18	"Ghost Monster Kyudora Appears" "Yūrei Kaijū Kyudora Arawaru" (Japanese: ゆうれい怪獣キュドラあらわる)	Yoshiharu Tomita	Norio Osada	August 13, 1967
19	"Mythical Monster Urugon Appears!!" "Shinwa Kaijū Urugon Arawaru!!" (Japanese: 神話怪獣ウルゴンあらわる!!)	Yoshiharu Tomita	Takeo Kaneko	August 20, 1967
20	"Spectral Monster Shamolar Appears!!" "Supekutoru Kaijū Shamorā Arawaru!!" (Japanese: スペクトル怪獣シャモラーあらわる!!)	Katsuhiko Taguchi	Susumu Takaku	August 27, 1967
21	"Radio Wabe Monster Alien Rajigon Appears!!" "Denpa Kaibutsu Rajigon Hoshibito Arawaru!!" (Japanese: 電波怪物ラジゴン星人あらわる!!)	Katsuhiko Taguchi	Toru Iguchi	September 3, 1967
22	"The Monster Army Appears!!" "Kaijū Gundan Awawaru!!" (Japanese: 怪獣軍団あらわる!!)	Minoru Yamada	Susumu Takaku	September 10, 1967
23	"Damn You, Monster Army!!" "Kutabare Kaijū Gundan!!" (Japanese: くたばれ怪獣軍団!!)	Minoru Yamada	Susumu Takaku	September 17, 1967
24	"Go Captain, Beyond the Universe!" "Ike! Kyaputan Uchū o Koete" (Japanese: 行け！キャプテン 宇宙をこえて)	Hajime Sato	Yoshi Kai	September 24, 1967
