= Joey Cavalieri =

American comic book writer

- Born: 1947 (age 78–79) Anchorage, Alaska, U.S.
- Areas: Writer, Editor
- Notable works: Black Cat; Huntress; Super Powers

Joey Cavalieri is an American writer and editor of comic books. He is best known for his work on the characters Green Arrow and Huntress as well as the co-creation of Helena Bertinelli, the third Huntress, for DC Comics.

== Career ==
Joey Cavalieri attended the School of Visual Arts, graduating with a BFA in Media Arts in 1979.

Cavalieri first joined DC Comics full-time in 1982 after working three years as a freelancer. His writing credits for DC include the Green Arrow back-up feature in Detective Comics; both the pre-Crisis version of the Huntress in a back-up feature in Wonder Woman and the post-Crisis version of the character in an ongoing series; Captain Carrot and His Amazing Zoo Crew! and its spinoff The Oz-Wonderland War; The Flash; and World's Finest Comics. A drug awareness comic book in The New Teen Titans sponsored by IBM and scripted by Cavalieri was published in cooperation with The President's Drug Awareness Campaign in 1984. That same year, he scripted the Super Powers limited series which tied-in with the Kenner Products toyline of the same name. Cavalieri and artist Jerome K. Moore introduced a new costume for the Black Canary character in Detective Comics #554 (Sept. 1985). In 1985, Cavalieri was one of the contributing writers for the company's 50th anniversary publication Fifty Who Made DC Great. He was group editor of the Marvel 2099 series from 1992 until 1996 and wrote stories for several Marvel titles such as The Avengers, Marvel Comics Presents, and Web of Spider-Man before returning to DC. The first Black Cat limited series was co-written by Cavalieri and Terry Kavanagh in 1994.

Cavalieri has been recognized for his work with nominations for the Comics Buyer's Guide Fan Award for Favorite Editor every year from 1997 through 2000, and again from 2002 to 2004. In 2005, DC promoted him to Senior Editor.

He also teaches cartooning classes at the School of Visual Arts.

== Bibliography ==
=== DC Comics ===
- Action Comics #575 (1986)
- Adventures of Superboy #19, 22 (1991–1992)
- Atari Force #13 (1985)
- Blue Beetle #12 (1987)
- Bugs Bunny #1–3 (1990)
- Captain Carrot and His Amazing Zoo Crew! #19–20 (1983)
- Daring New Adventures of Supergirl #9–12 (Lois Lane backup stories) (1983)
- DC Comics Presents Annual #3 (1984)
- DCU Holiday Special 2010 #1 (2010)
- Detective Comics #521–525, 527–548, 551–554, 556–557, 560–567 (Green Arrow backup stories); #568 (Batman) (1982–1986)
- Elvira's House of Mystery #1–3, 5–6, Special #1 (1986–1987)
- The Flash #330–331 (1984)
- The Flash vol. 2 #227–230 (2005–2006)
- The Flintstones and the Jetsons #19 (1999)
- The Fury of Firestorm #28–30, 37 (1984–1985)
- Green Lantern vol. 2 #166–169, 173, 182–183 (1983–1984)
- Green Lantern Corps #224, Annual #3 (1987–1988)
- Heroes Against Hunger #1 (1986)
- House of Mystery #292, 301, 305–306, 308–309, 315 (1981–1983)
- Huntress #1–19 (1989–1990)
- Joker/Daffy Duck #1 (2018)
- Justice League International Special #2 (1991)
- Justice League of America #225–227 (1984)
- Justice League Quarterly #5 (1991)
- Looney Tunes #147, 149–150, 178, 187 (2007–2010)
- Looney Tunes Magazine #1 (1990)
- Lost World of the Warlord #1 (Remco toy giveaway) (1983)
- Ms. Tree Quarterly #8 (1992)
- The New Teen Titans (The President's Drug Awareness Campaign) #3 (1984)
- Omega Men #16 (1984)
- Oz-Wonderland Wars #1–3 (1986)
- The Saga of the Swamp Thing #9–10 (Phantom Stranger backup stories) (1983)
- Secret Origins vol. 2 #43 (Chris KL-99) (1989)
- Secrets of Haunted House #46 (1982)
- Super Powers #1–4 (1984)
- Supergirl Movie Special #1 (1985)
- Superman #393, 396, 398–399 (1984)
- Superman Adventures: Dimension of the Dark Shadows #1 (video game promo) (1998)
- Tiny Toon Adventures Magazine #1–2 (1990)
- Weird War Tales #104 (1981)
- Wonder Woman #296–299, 301–321 (Huntress backup stories) (1982–1984)
- Wonder Woman vol. 2 #65 (1992)
- World's Finest Comics #279–281 (Green Arrow backup stories); #310–321, 323 (Superman and Batman team-up stories) (1982–1986)

=== Marvel Comics ===
- The Avengers #376–377 (1994)
- Disney Comic Hits #2 (1995)
- Excalibur Annual #1 (1993)
- Felicia Hardy: The Black Cat #1–4 (1994)
- Ghost Rider Annual #1 (1993)
- Marvel Action Hour, Featuring the Fantastic Four #1–6, 8 (1994–1995)
- Marvel Comics Presents #111, 113–118, 125–132, 137 (1992–1993)
- Namor, the Sub-Mariner #27 (1992)
- Real Heroes #3 (promo) (1994)
- Spider-Man Magazine #1 (1994)
- Web of Spider-Man #109, 114, Annual #10 (1994)

=== Pacific Comics ===
- Vanguard Illustrated #6 (1984)

| Preceded by Kurt Busiek | Justice League of America writer 1984 | Succeeded by Gerry Conway |
| Preceded by Kurt Busiek | World's Finest Comics writer 1984–1986 | Succeeded by n/a |
| Preceded by Bob Harras | The Avengers writer 1994 | Succeeded by Bob Harras |
| Preceded by KC Carlson | Action Comics editor 1996–1999 | Succeeded by Eddie Berganza |
| Preceded by KC Carlson | The Adventures of Superman editor 1996–1999 | Succeeded by Eddie Berganza |
| Preceded by KC Carlson | Superman vol. 2 editor 1996–1999 | Succeeded by Eddie Berganza |
| Preceded by KC Carlson | Superman: The Man of Steel editor 1996–1999 | Succeeded by Eddie Berganza |
