= Oriental Stories =

American pulp magazine (1930–1934)

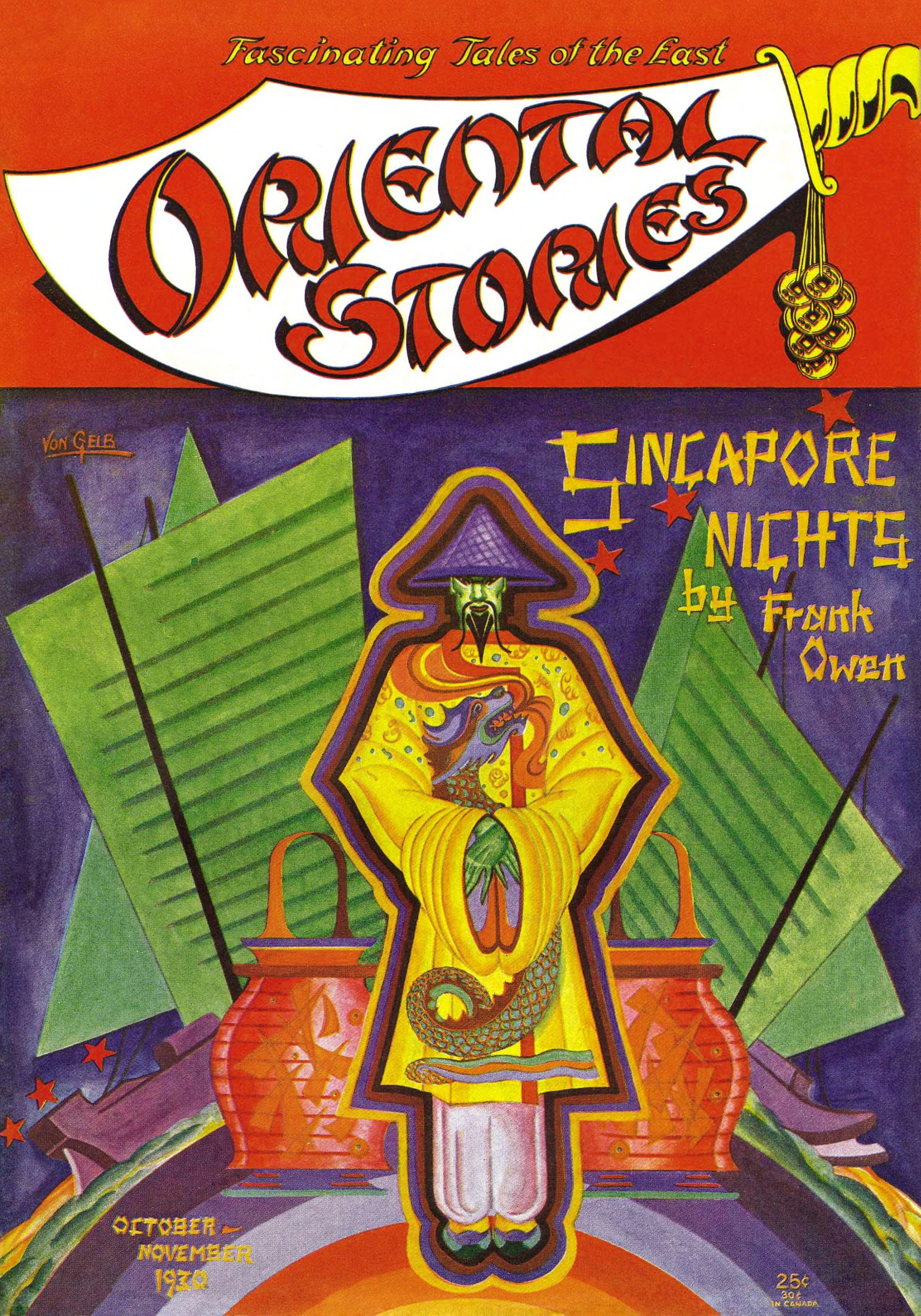
- Cover of first issue (October/November 1930), in wonton font
- Editor: Farnsworth Wright
- First issue: October 1930
- Final issue: January 1934
- Company: Popular Fiction
- Country: United States

Oriental Stories, later retitled The Magic Carpet Magazine, was an American pulp magazine published by Popular Fiction and edited by Farnsworth Wright. It was launched in 1930 under the title Oriental Stories as a companion to Popular Fiction's Weird Tales, and carried stories with far eastern settings, including some fantasy. Contributors included Robert E. Howard, Frank Owen, and E. Hoffmann Price. In 1932 publication was paused after the Summer issue; it was relaunched in 1933 under the title The Magic Carpet Magazine, with an expanded editorial policy that now included any story set in an exotic location, including other planets.

Some science fiction began to appear alongside the fantasy and adventure material as a result, including work by Edmond Hamilton. Wright obtained stories from H. Bedford Jones, who was a popular pulp writer, and Seabury Quinn. Most of the covers of The Magic Carpet Magazine were by Margaret Brundage, including her first sale; Brundage later became well known as a cover artist for Weird Tales. Competition from established pulps in the same niche, such as Adventure, was too strong, and after five issues under the new title the magazine ceased publication.

== Publication history and contents ==
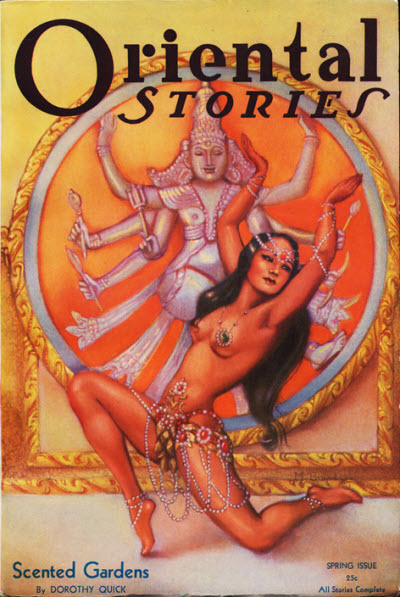
Oriental Stories cover for Spring 1932

In 1923 J. C. Henneberger and J. M. Lansinger's Rural Publishing Corporation launched Weird Tales as a companion to their existing magazines, College Humor, The Magazine of Fun, and Detective Tales. Weird Tales soon ran into financial trouble, and in late 1924 Henneberger and Lansinger split control of their stable of magazines: Henneberger formed a new company, Popular Fiction, took Weird Tales, and gave up the other titles to Lansinger. Henneberger hired Farnsworth Wright as editor; Wright liked adventure and fantasy fiction with oriental settings, and printed some in Weird Tales, by writers such as Frank Owen. In 1930 Henneberger and Wright decided to launch a companion magazine that specialized in oriental fiction. According to Henneberger's later recollection, the idea came from Weird Tales's printer, who was looking to fill unused slots in his printing schedule, but Wright later claimed that the magazine's launch was inspired by President Herbert Hoover's optimism about the economy.

The plans for the new magazine were in place by June 1930, when Wright wrote to Robert E. Howard, telling him about the new magazine, and asking him to submit stories. Howard complied, and his "The Voice of El-Lil", about a lost city in Mesopotamia, appeared in the first issue, along with two stories by Frank Owen, and "The Man Who Limped" by Otis Adelbert Kline, the first in a series about a dragoman (interpreter) named Hamad the Attar. Other contributors included E. Hoffmann Price, Frank Belknap Long, August Derleth, and David H. Keller. These were all known for fantasy, but Oriental Stories also published work by writers of non-fantasy adventures, including S. B. H. Hurst, James W. Bennett, and Warren Hastings. Frank Owen followed his stories in the first issue with seven more over the next three years, including "Della Wu, Chinese Courtesan", in the third issue, described by the magazine historian Mike Ashley as one of his best-known tales.

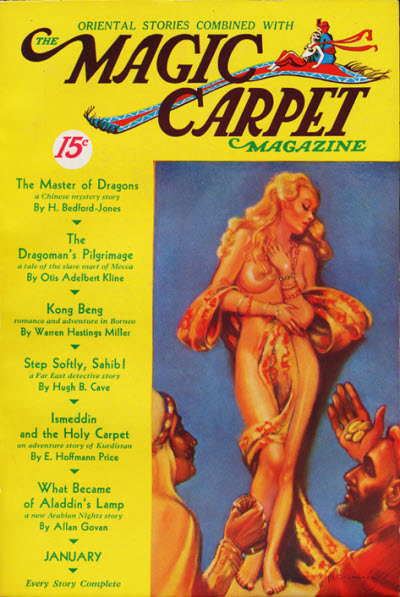
The first issue under the new title, dated January 1933. The cover art is by Margaret Brundage.

The schedule was initially bimonthly (every two months), with a date of October/November 1930 on the cover of the first issue, but this only lasted for three issues before changing to quarterly. The Spring 1932 issue contained Dorothy Quick's first sale to Wright, "Scented Gardens"; Quick sold one more story to Oriental Stories and many more to Weird Tales over the next two decades. The cover of the Spring 1932 issue was Margaret Brundage's first sale to a pulp. Wright used Brundage's artwork on the cover of every remaining issue of the magazine except for July 1933, which was by J. Allen St. John, a popular pulp artist. Brundage went on to become one of Weird Tales' best-known cover artists of the 1930s.

After the Summer 1932 issue there was a break in publication, while Wright planned to relaunch it. The next issue was dated January 1933 (though the schedule remained quarterly), and the title was now The Magic Carpet Magazine. Wright had decided to broaden the editorial policy to include stories from any faraway places, including other planets; this meant the magazine was now a market for science fiction as well as fantasy and adventure stories. The second issue under the new title included Edmond Hamilton's "Kaldar, World of Antares", the first in a series similar to Edgar Rice Burroughs's Barsoom stories which were set on Mars. Howard, a regular in Oriental Stories, continued to appear, with three more contributions; the last, "The Shadow of the Vulture", was the first story of his to feature Red Sonya, a female barbarian heroine who became the basis for the Red Sonja character in comics and films.

More regulars from Weird Tales began to appear, including Seabury Quinn. The January 1933 issue included H. Bedford Jones's "Master of Dragons". Jones was a very popular writer who wrote for higher-paying pulps, and Wright would have been delighted to secure a story from him, though Ashley suggests that since The Magic Carpet Magazine's rates were lower than Jones' usual markets, this was probably a story that had already been rejected by other magazines. Jones sold two more stories to Wright over the next year, but the magazine was not doing well financially. The "exotic adventure story" niche was already occupied by successful pulp magazines such as Adventure, and The Magic Carpet Magazine did not have the resources to compete. The January 1934 issue was the last one. Material bought for the magazine by Wright was published in Weird Tales instead, including another Kaldar story by Edmond Hamilton.

The magazine, under both titles, fetches high prices from collectors. Ed Hulse, a historian of pulp magazines, considers the January 1934 issue likely to be the most expensive because it includes Howard's "Red Sonya" story, but a 2001 price guide to pulp collecting lists all issues at between $150 and $200 (equivalent to $270 to $360 in 2025), except for the first issue, October/November 1930, which is listed at $300.

== Bibliographic details ==
	Winter			Spring			Summer			Autumn		
	Jan	Feb	Mar	Apr	May	Jun	Jul	Aug	Sep	Oct	Nov	Dec
1930										1/1		1/2
1931	1/2	1/3		1/4			1/5			1/6		
1932	2/1			2/2			2/3					
1933	3/1			3/2			3/3			3/4		
1934	4/1											
Issues of Oriental Stories, showing volume/issue number. Underlining indicates that an issue was titled as a quarterly (e.g. "Summer 1931") rather than as a monthly. From the January 1933 issue the title was changed to The Magic Carpet Magazine. Farnsworth Wright was editor throughout.

The magazine, under both titles, was published by Popular Fiction Co. of Chicago, and edited by Farnsworth Wright. It was in small pulp format (6.5 by 9 inches (17 by 23 cm)). Each issue of Oriental Stories was 144 pages, and priced at 25 cents (equivalent to $4.80 in 2025). The page count dropped to 128 pages when the title changed to The Magic Carpet Magazine, and the price dropped to 15 cents; with the October 1933 issue the price went back up to 25 cents. The volume numbering was irregular; the first three volumes had six, three, and four issues, and there was a final volume of one issue. Oriental Stories maintained a bimonthly schedule for three issues, and then switched to quarterly: the fourth issue was dated "April–May–June 1931" internally, and labelled "Spring issue" on the cover. There was a three-month hiatus when the title changed, and then The Magic Carpet Magazine stayed on a quarterly schedule throughout its run.

Two anthologies collected fiction from Oriental Stories and The Magic Carpet Magazine:

- Desmond, William (1975). Oriental Stories: Fascinating Tales of the East. Melrose Highlands, Massachusetts: Odyssey Publications. OCLC 56125660.
- Desmond, William (1977). The Magic Carpet Magazine. Melrose Highlands, Massachusetts: Odyssey Publications. OCLC 56128169.

== Sources ==
- Ashley, Michael (1976) [1974]. The History of the Science Fiction Magazine Volume 1: 1926–1935. Chicago: Henry Regnery Company. ISBN 0-8092-8003-5.
- Ashley, Mike (1985). "Oriental Stories". In Tymn, Marshall B.; Ashley, Mike (eds.). Science Fiction, Fantasy, and Weird Fiction Magazines. Westport, Connecticut: Greenwood Press. pp. 454–456. ISBN 978-0-313-21221-5.
- Ashley, Mike (2000). The Time Machines: The Story of the Science-Fiction Pulp Magazines from the beginning to 1950. Liverpool: Liverpool University Press. ISBN 0-85323-865-0.
- Burke, Rusty (2007). "A Short Biography of Robert E. Howard". The Best of Robert E. Howard, Volume One: Crimson Shadows. New York: Del Rey Books. pp. 485–496. ISBN 978-0-345-49018-6.
- Cottrill, Tim (2001). Bookery Fantasy's Ultimate Guide to the Pulps. Fairborn, Ohio: Bookery Press. OCLC 49312554.
- Howard, Robert E. (January 1934). "The Shadow of the Vulture". The Magic Carpet Magazine. Vol. 4, no. 1. pp. 39–65.
- Hulse, Ed (2013). The Blood'n'Thunder Guide to Pulp Fiction. Murania Press. ISBN 978-1491010938.
- Locke, John (2018). The Thing's Incredible! The Secret Origins of Weird Tales. Elkhorn, California: Off-Trail Publications. ISBN 978-1-935-03125-3.
- Weinberg, Robert (1999) [1977]. "A Brief History". In Weinberg, Robert (ed.). The Weird Tales Story. Berkeley Heights, New Jersey: Wildside Press. pp. 3–6. ISBN 1-58715-101-4.
