= Strange Gateways =

Book by E. Hoffmann Price

- Dust-jacket illustration by Lee Brown Coye for Strange Gateways
- Author: E. Hoffmann Price
- Cover artist: Lee Brown Coye
- Language: English
- Genre: Fantasy, horror
- Publisher: Arkham House
- Publication date: 1967
- Publication place: United States
- Media type: Print (hardback)
- Pages: 208

Strange Gateways is a collection of stories by American writer E. Hoffmann Price. It was released in 1967 by Arkham House in an edition of 2,007 copies. It was the author's first hardcover collection. The tale "Tarbis of the Lake" is a collaboration with H. P. Lovecraft.

== Contents ==
Strange Gateways contains the following tales:

- "The Fire and the Flesh"
- "Graven Image"
- "The Stranger from Kurdistan"
- "The Rajah's Gift"
- "The Girl From Samarkand"
- "Tarbis of the Lake"
- "Bones for China"
- "Well of the Angels"
- "Strange Gateway"
- "Apprentice Magician"
- "One More River"
- "Pale Hands"

== Sources ==
- Jaffery, Sheldon (1989). The Arkham House Companion. Mercer Island, WA: Starmont House, Inc. p. 88. ISBN 1-55742-005-X.
- Chalker, Jack L.; Mark Owings (1998). The Science-Fantasy Publishers: A Bibliographic History, 1923-1998. Westminster, MD and Baltimore: Mirage Press, Ltd. p. 44.
- Joshi, S.T. (1999). Sixty Years of Arkham House: A History and Bibliography. Sauk City, WI: Arkham House. p. 100. ISBN 0-87054-176-5.
- Nielsen, Leon (2004). Arkham House Books: A Collector's Guide. Jefferson, NC and London: McFarland & Company, Inc. pp. 100–101. ISBN 0-7864-1785-4.
