= The Avenger from Atlantis =

2021 book by Edmond Hamilton

- Cover of first edition
- Author: Edmond Hamilton
- Cover artist: Margaret Brundage
- Language: English
- Genre: Science fantasy
- Publisher: DMR Books
- Publication date: 2021
- Publication place: United States
- Media type: print (paperback), ebook
- Pages: 224
- ISBN: 978-1735898230

The Avenger from Atlantis is a collection of science fantasy short stories by American author Edmond Hamilton. It was first published in trade paperback and ebook by DMR Books in January 2021. It was the second of two Hamilton collections issued by that publisher, the first being The Twilight of the Gods (2020).

== Summary ==
The book collects eight short works of fiction by the author featuring "concepts such as fighting men of disparate ages uniting against alien tyrants, Atlantean scientists attempting immortality, or a civilization inside an active volcano."

== Contents ==
- "The Six Sleepers" (from Weird Tales, Oct. 1935). Prospector Garry Winton, plunged into suspended animation in a gas-filled cave with a handful of other victims from throughout human history, wakes to a future ruled by rat-men.
- "The Fire Creatures" (from Weird Tales, Jul. 1933). A scientist exploring the interior of a volcano disappears, prompting his daughter and her beau to go in after him to brave the same menace he discovered.
- "The Avenger from Atlantis" (from Weird Tales, Jul. 1935). Atlanteans Ulios and Sthan seek vengeance on the former's estranged wife Etain and her lover Karnath, who have destroyed the island continent; each pair employing body-swapping technology to extend their lives, the pursuit continues down the ages.
- "Child of Atlantis" (from Weird Tales, Dec. 1937). Castaways on a jungle island encounter a force that controls people's wills.
- "Comrades of Time" (from Weird Tales, Mar. 1939). Ethan Drew is drawn from his place in time and imprisoned with warriors from different ages. They must collaborate to escape and return to whence they came.
- "Armies from the Past" (from Weird Tales, Apr. 1939). The protagonists from "Comrades of Time" are reunited and reinforced by soldiers from many eras to defeat a menace in the far future.
- "Dreamer’s Worlds" (from Weird Tales, Nov. 1941). Modern man Henry Stevens dreams of being mighty warrior Khal Kan, who in turn dreams of being Stevens. Which world is real? Are both?
- "The Shadow Folk" (from Weird Tales, Sep. 1944). Secreting from the wider world it fears, a hidden race is revealed at last.
