= The Haunted Stars =

1960 novel by Edmond Hamilton

- First edition
- Author: Edmond Hamilton
- Language: English
- Genre: Science fiction
- Published: 1960 Dodd Mead/Torquil
- Publication place: United States
- Media type: Print (Hardback)
- Pages: 192 (Hardback edition)
- OCLC: 2160293

The Haunted Stars is a science fiction novel by American writer Edmond Hamilton. It tells the story of an expedition from Earth (which is in the throes of an arms race) to a planet of the star Altair — a planet called Ryn, inhabited by humans like those on Earth. Against the wishes of Ryn's inhabitants, the team from Earth seek information about weapons technology used in an ancient space war. Their unsuccessful search ends in dramatic contact with another species, the ancient enemy of Ryn.

The novel was first published in 1960 by Torquil Books and belongs to a class of novels which add a darker tone to the popular tradition of space opera. It has been published in English, German, Italian, and Portuguese.

== Plot ==
The action takes place in an imagined future a few years after the time of writing. Tension between the US and the Soviet Union remains high. Both nations have landed on the Moon, and established bases there.

Just under half the length of the novel tells how a discovery on the Moon brings Massachusetts linguist Robert Fairlie to a high-security space base in New Mexico and eventually to the planet Ryn. The remainder of the novel is about what happens on Ryn after Fairlie and his companions arrive: their contact with some of the inhabitants of the planet, and later with Ryn's ancient enemy, the "shadowed ones".

=== From Massachusetts to Ryn ===
Why would an organization exploring the Moon need the services of a specialist in ancient languages? Professor Robert Fairlie of Massachusetts University ponders that question when he is shanghaied and taken to Morrow Base, America's spaceport, in New Mexico. At Morrow, with three other linguists drafted into the project, he learns that an American expedition to Gassendi crater has made a discovery which US authorities are keeping secret — machinery, documents and speech recordings left over from a battle thirty thousand years before. The four men have been brought to Morrow to translate the extraterrestrial language. They're to be supervised by the urbane Nils Christensen, chief of the Lunar Project, and the tightly wound and demanding Glenn DeWitt, whose background is military. The secrecy surrounding the project has to do with the arms race — it is considered most important that secrets of advanced extraterrestrial technology will not fall into the wrong hands.

Acting on a playful hunch, Fairlie discovers that the language of the ancient Moon base has remarkable similarities to Sumerian and he begins translating the material brought from Gassendi. The accuracy of Fairlie’s tentative translation is validated by a test of two super-powerful ion engines taken from a wrecked ship in Gassendi, a test in which DeWitt demonstrates his reckless character by ordering one of the engines turned on while there are people outside the bunker. Confident in his hypothesis, Fairlie translates more documents and discovers that the extraterrestrials called themselves Vanryn and came from Ryn, the third planet of Altair. Their bases on the Moon and elsewhere fought a losing battle against an enemy whom the documents don't describe in detail, but imply was not human — an enemy determined to stop human beings from travelling in space ever again. Meanwhile a biologist discovers that the Vanryn were the same species as modern humans on Earth — that modern Earth people are actually the descendants of Vanryn colonists.

With the translations that Fairlie and his colleagues produce, scientists and engineers (still working in secret) recreate the Vanryn machines, and then they build a starship. With Christensen in command and DeWitt, who hopes to find Vanryn super-weapons, as second in command, Fairlie and a team of others ride the ship towards Ryn. While the ship flies through hyperspace, they suffer nightmares about the Vanryn's mysterious enemies. On Ryn they land their ship next to the slagged remains of a once-great starport and the decayed ruins of the city that had stood by it, surrounded by forest.

=== Contact with the Vanryn and their enemy ===
In the brush-covered ruins they make contact with one of the inhabitants of Ryn, a young woman called Aral who is curious about the spacecraft. Fairlie discovers to his astonishment that she can understand him, that the Vanryn language has remained much the same for three hundred centuries. (He learns later that this is because the Vanryn have kept playable recordings of their ancestors' songs and speeches.) Even so, the party from Earth find it difficult to establish relations with the local people, most of whom avoid them. Not even the adventurous Aral wants to stay and talk.

An argument develops among the Earth people about how to deal with the elusive Vanryn. DeWitt wants to capture and question local people such as Aral to get what he expects to be vital military information. Fairlie and Christensen angrily oppose such strong-arm methods. During the argument, Christensen has a heart attack which eventually kills him.

DeWitt then takes command. He leads a small exploration party (including Fairlie) which pursues Aral and her male companion Thrayn towards their community. It is a city overgrown with vegetation, with limited technology and only the simplest of weapons. Fairlie learns, from Aral and Thrayn, that people on Ryn still remember and fear their enemy in the ancient war, whom they name as the Llorn, and also call "the shadowed ones". They think that the arrival of the Earth spacecraft will draw the Llorn's attention. Aral and Thrayn are different from the others, more interested in the achievements of their spacefaring ancestors; although they share their neighbours' fear of the Llorn. They are rejected by their neighbours for revealing the community's location to the Earth people, and become reluctant helpers of DeWitt's expedition.

A passing mention by Thrayn of the Hall of Suns gives DeWitt a glimmer of hope that his quest for advanced weapons will bear fruit. As the team approaches the mountain into which the Hall is carved, Aral becomes white with fear, but DeWitt will not let her go. The Hall of Suns turns out to be an ancient monument to the glory of Vanryn expansion through the stars. Although it seems clear that the space is purely ceremonial, DeWitt compels his team to keep looking for the military technology that he expects to find there.

Then another spacecraft arrives, surrounded by shadow, a hallmark of the Llorn. Aral and Thrayn try to run away. DeWitt grabs them. While DeWitt and Thrayn are grappling, Aral stabs DeWitt dead with a stolen knife, and flees with Thrayn. The Llorn then begin to speak to the Earth expedition, using the Vanryn language. Fairlie, who is the only member of the expedition who speaks Vanryn, goes to meet them.

The Llorn tell Fairlie that they know his people come from Earth, are descendants of the ancient Vanryn, and have violated the Llorn's ban on Vanryn space flight. They go on to state the reasons for the ancient war. Llorn do not colonise other planets, because they value the diversity of intelligent life which evolution naturally produces on different worlds. The Vanryn, in their spacefaring days, valued only their own species, set up colonies on other worlds, and thereby prevented evolution from taking its natural course. To show what they mean about evolutionary diversity, the Llorn lift the veil of shadow that surrounds them, revealing their physical forms — they are two-legged, two-armed humanlike beings, but their bodies differ in several visible ways from those of Earth people — for instance, they don't have necks. They tell Fairlie that they have decided not to go to war with Earth, even though Earth people have begun to fly to other stars. They simply want to warn Earth people not to repeat the vainglorious and ultimately self-defeating behaviour of their Vanryn ancestors. The story ends with Fairlie and his companions about to return to Earth, uncertain how the message from the Llorn will be received.

== Reception ==
Floyd C. Gale of Galaxy Science Fiction in 1963 rated the novel 4.5 stars out of five, stating that "Hamilton was extra careful with his story ending and you should be, to [sic]. It's loaded".

John Clute, a contributor to the Encyclopedia of Science Fiction, found the Haunted Stars "well-characterized", and thinks it is probably the best of a group of Hamilton novels which, "though in the space opera tradition", are "more carefully composed and darker in texture" than other works by the same author.

Science fiction novelist Dan Moore describes the Haunted Stars as "a timeless cautionary tale". He writes that fifty years after its first publication, the Haunted Stars remains a "thought-provoking" work, which "explores the friction between scientific inquiry and the use of technology for military ends" and "raises profound questions about humanity’s behavior when confronted with an alien culture".

According to M. Harold Page of Black Gate magazine, the Haunted Stars was written at the point when Edmond Hamilton's writing career overlaps with that of Arthur C Clarke. "The theme plus the real-world political setting makes it sit well next to Rendezvous with Rama, Childhood's End, and 2001."

The book was also reviewed by

- H.H. Holmes in Herald Tribune Book Review (1960 May 13)
- S.E. Cotts in Amazing Science Fiction Stories (Jul 1960)
- An uncredited reviewer in New Frontiers (Aug 1960)
- P. Schuyler Miller in Analog Science Fact - Fiction (Nov 1960)
- Donald Malcolm in Vector 33 (1965)

== Publication history ==
- 1960, US, Torquil (Dodd Mead), Mar 1960, Hardback (192 pp).
- 1962, US, Pyramid Books (#F-698), Feb 1962, Paperback (159 pp)
- 1964, Germany, Moewig (Terra Sonderband #84), Digest (96 pp), as Das Gestirn der Ahnen (The Star of the Ancestors)
- 1964, Italy, Arnoldo Mondadori Editore (Urania #331), Apr 1964, Digest (167 pp), as Gli incappucciati d’ombra (The Hooded Shades)
- 1965, United Kingdom, Herbert Jenkins, Hardback (174 pp)
- 1975, Italy, Arnoldo Mondadori Editore (Urania #671), May 1975, Digest (144 pp), as Gli incappucciati d’ombra (The Hooded Shades)
- 1978, Brazil, Livros do Brasil (Argonauta #256), Paperback, as Trevas nas Estrelas (Dark Star)
- 1982, Italy, Arnoldo Mondadori Editore (Classici Urania #65), Aug 1982, Paperback (164 pp), as Gli incappucciati d’ombra (The Hooded Shades)

== Sources ==
- Gombert, Richard W., World Wrecker: An Annotated Bibliography of Edmond Hamilton, Pg. 34, The Borgo Press, Rockville (MD), 2009
- Tuck, Donald H. (1974). The Encyclopedia of Science Fiction and Fantasy. Chicago: Advent. pg. 203. ISBN 0-911682-20-1.
- Clute, John. "Hamilton, Edmond." The Encyclopedia of Science Fiction. Eds. John Clute, David Langford, Peter Nicholls and Graham Sleight. Gollancz, 31 July 2014. Web. 26 Aug. 2014. <http://www.sf-encyclopedia.com/entry/hamilton_edmond>.

== Listings ==
The book is listed at

- The Library of Congress as http://lccn.loc.gov/59015721
- The British Library as UIN = BLL01001578873
