= Far Lands, Other Days =

- Dust-jacket from the first edition
- Author: E. Hoffmann Price
- Illustrator: George Evans
- Cover artist: George Evans
- Language: English
- Genre: fantasy, horror and mystery short stories
- Publisher: Carcosa
- Publication date: 1975
- Publication place: United States
- Media type: Print (hardback)
- Pages: xxi, 588
- ISBN: 0-913796-01-8
- OCLC: 2010043

Far Lands, Other Days is a collection of fantasy, horror and mystery short stories by American writer E. Hoffmann Price. It was released in 1975 by Carcosa in an edition of 2,593 copies of which 615 copies, that were pre-ordered, were signed by the author and artist. The stories originally appeared in the magazines Weird Tales, Strange Detective Stories, Spicy-Adventure Stories, Golden Fleece, Argosy, Spicy Mystery Stories, Strange Stories, Short Stories, Terror Tales and Speed Mystery.

== Contents ==
- "Foreword"
- "The Word of Santiago"
- "The Peacock's Shadow"
- "Gray Spinx"
- "Makeda's Cousin"
- "Satan's Garden"
- "Queen of the Lilin"
- "The Dreamer of Atlanaat"
- "A Jest and a Vengeance"
- "Wolves of Kerak"
- "The Hand of Wrath"
- "One Step From Hell"
- "Web of Wizardry/ Saladin's Throne-Rug"
- "Allah Sends a Reaper"
- "Khosru's Garden"
- "Hasheesh Wisdom"
- "Snake Goddess"
- "House of the Monoceros"
- "You Can't Eat Glory"
- "Woman in the Case"
- "Heart of a Thief"
- "Kiss of Sekhmet"
- "Vengeance in Samarra"
- "Selene Walks by Night"
- "Prayer to Satan"
- "A King is Next to God"
- "Shadow Captain"
- "Peach Blossom Paradise"
- "The Hands of Janos"
- "The Shadow of Saturn"
- "The Infidel's Daughter"

== Awards ==
In 1976, the collection was nominated for the World Fantasy Award, Best Collection/Anthology.

== Sources ==
- Chalker, Jack L.; Mark Owings (1998). The Science-Fantasy Publishers: A Bibliographic History, 1923-1998. Westminster, MD and Baltimore: Mirage Press, Ltd. pp. 136–137.
- Turner, Rodger. "Publishers". SF Site. Archived from the original on December 1, 1998.
