= Twilight of the Gods (Hamilton collection) =

2020 collection of short stories by Edmond Hamilton

- Cover of first edition
- Author: Edmond Hamilton
- Cover artist: Robert Gibson Jones
- Language: English
- Genre: Science fantasy
- Publisher: DMR Books
- Publication date: 2020
- Publication place: United States
- Media type: print (paperback), ebook
- Pages: 244
- ISBN: 978-1-73589-822-3

Twilight of the Gods is a collection of science fantasy short stories by American author Edmond Hamilton. It was first published in trade paperback and ebook by DMR Books in November 2020. It was the first of two Hamilton collections issued by that publisher, the second being The Avenger from Atlantis (2021).

== Summary ==
The book collects eight short works of fiction by the author, united by the theme of adventurous protagonists from the time of World War II encountering lost worlds out of myth and legend, or revived menaces from such worlds.

== Contents ==
- "Twilight of the Gods" (from Weird Tales, Jul. 1948). Amnesiac Eric Wolverson seeks the key to his lost past, only to discover it more shocking than he could have imagined, as he finds his way to Asgard, world of the Norse gods, where he is hailed as the lost god Tyr of the Æsir.
- "Priestess of the Labyrinth" (from Weird Tales, Jan. 1945). Archaeologist Brad Marlin encounters an ages lost mystery while visiting Crete.
- "The Shining Land" (from Weird Tales, May 1945). Soldier Brian Cullan passes through a portal to the Shining Land of the Tuatha De Danann from Celtic myth, where he is taken for a legendary hero.
- "Lost Elysium" (from Weird Tales, Nov. 1945). Cullan returns to Tir Sorcha to find it devastated by the Fomorians, who hope to use the portal to invade Earth.
- "The Valley of the Gods" (from Weird Tales, May 1946). Garth Abbott, seeking the lost Central American realm of Xibalba, finds himself avatar to a spirit engaged in an ancient conflict.
- "The King of Shadows" (from Weird Tales, Jan. 1947). John Fallon searches for his vanished friend Carnaby in the depths of Central Asia. What he finds is the Road of Erlik.
- "Serpent Princess" (from Weird Tales, Jan. 1948). Hugh Macklin unearths forgotten, cursed temple containing a bell that can awaken the sleeping deity Tiamat.
- "The Daughter of Thor" (from Fantastic Adventures, Aug. 1942). Two prisoners of war fleeing the Nazis stumble on another world, where the beautiful Brynhild is the key to salvation or doom.
