= The Planet of Peril =

1929 novel by Otis Adelbert Kline

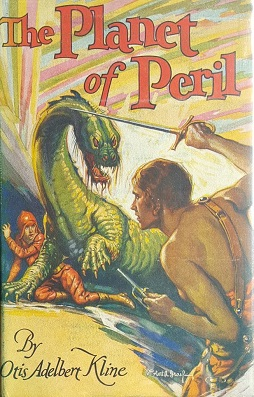
- First edition cover
- Author: Otis Adelbert Kline
- Illustrator: Robert A. Graef
- Language: English
- Series: Robert Grandon
- Genre: Science fiction novel
- Publisher: A. C. McClurg
- Publication date: 1929
- Publication place: United States
- Media type: Print (Hardback)
- Pages: 358
- OCLC: 1834793
- Followed by: The Prince of Peril

The Planet of Peril, later republished as Planet of Peril, is a 1929 science fiction novel by Otis Adelbert Kline. Originally serialized in six parts in Argosy All-Story Weekly during the summer of 1929, it was published in hardcover later that year by A. C. McClurg and reissued in a lower-price edition by Grosset & Dunlap. It was revived in 1961 as an Avalon Books hardcover and saw its only mass market paperback edition from Ace Books in 1963. The later editions, well after Kline's death, were revised and shortened.

The novel focuses on a slave rebellion on the planet Venus, the overthrowing of an oppressive regime, and the successful attempt of the rebel leader to become the planet's new emperor.

== Plot ==
Planet of Peril is the first volume in Kline's "Grandon" trilogy. It is a planetary romance, telling the story of Robert Grandon, who exchanges his mind with an inhabitant of Venus, finds himself a slave, escapes his captors, and rises to leadership of an army of rebels. He eventually marries the princess of the oppressive regime and becomes a benevolent emperor.

== Reception ==
Amazing Stories described Planet of Peril as "an exceedingly well-spun yarn [which] can heartily be recommended to all our readers, and to all lovers of imagination-stirring fiction".

P. Schuyler Miller wrote that Planet was "an open imitation of Burroughs, though on a different planet". E. F. Bleiler found the novel to be "sword-play and fantastic adventure in imitation of Edgar Rice Burroughs, describing it as "competent pulp adventure".
