= The Devil Wives of Li Fong =

First edition (publ. Del Rey Books)

The Devil Wives of Li Fong is a novel by E. Hoffmann Price published in 1979.

== Plot summary ==
The Devil Wives of Li Fong is a novel that takes place in long ago China as a land of myth and legend.

== Reception ==
Greg Costikyan reviewed The Devil Wives of Li Fong in Ares Magazine #2 and commented that "Price is a skilled craftsman. Even if he isn't the next Dostoyevsky, his Devil Wives is still much better than ninety percent of the dreck that's being marketed as fantasy these days."

== Reviews ==
- Review by Don Herron (1980) in Paragon, #1 May 1980
- Review by Tom Staicar (1980) in Fantastic, July 1980
- Review by Lin Carter (1980) in The Year's Best Fantasy Stories: 6
- Review by Mark Mansell (1980) in Science Fiction Review, Winter 1980
- Review by W. Paul Ganley (1984) in Fantasy Mongers, #10 Spring 1984
