= The Port of Peril =

1933 novel by Otis Adelbert Kline

- Dust-jacket from the first edition
- Author: Otis Adelbert Kline
- Illustrator: J. Allen St. John
- Language: English
- Series: Robert Grandon
- Genre: Science fiction
- Publisher: The Grandon Company
- Publication date: 1949
- Publication place: United States
- Media type: Print (Hardback)
- Pages: 218
- OCLC: 1145489
- Preceded by: The Prince of Peril

The Port of Peril is a science fiction novel by American writer Otis Adelbert Kline. It was first published in book form in 1949 by The Grandon Company in an edition of 3,000 copies. The novel was originally serialized in six parts in the magazine Weird Tales beginning in November 1932 under the title Buccaneers of Venus.

== Plot introduction ==
Set on Venus, the novel concerns Robert Grandon whose wife Vernia is kidnapped by the Huitsenni, a race of pirates. Grandon pursues them to their hidden port where, after joining forces with rebels, he overthrows their king. He discovers that Vernia has been taken to the north. He follows and eventually rescues his bride. They are both then captured by the Huitsenni and must be rescued by an army of allied nations working with the Huitsenni rebels.

== Reception ==
Astounding SF reviewer P. Schuyler Miller received the novel favorably, saying "If you like the Burroughs sheer adventure formula, this is better Burroughs than [Burroughs] has done himself for a long time."

== Sources ==
- Chalker, Jack L.; Mark Owings (1998). The Science-Fantasy Publishers: A Bibliographic History, 1923-1998. Westminster, MD and Baltimore: Mirage Press, Ltd. p. 316.
- Crawford, Jr., Joseph H.; James J. Donahue & Donald M. Grant (1953). "333", A Bibliography of the Science-Fantasy Novel. Providence, RI: The Grandon Company. p. 38. OCLC 3924496.
- Tuck, Donald H. (1974). The Encyclopedia of Science Fiction and Fantasy. Chicago: Advent. p. 255. ISBN 0-911682-20-1.
- Internet Archive,
