= E. Hoffmann Price =

American writer (1898–1988)

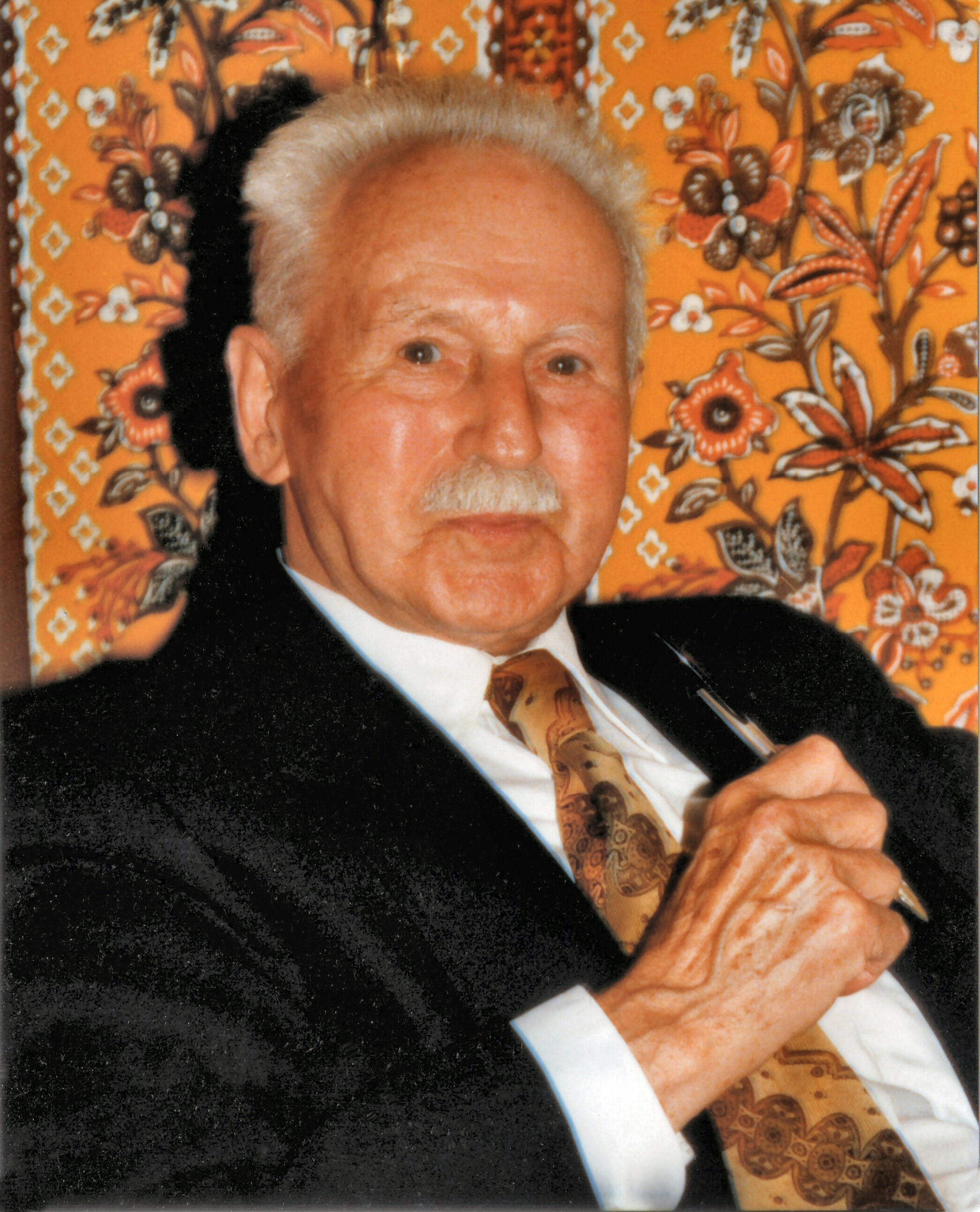
- E. Hoffmann Price – Fantasy Faire 10 – July 1980 Travel Lodge by LAX
- Born: July 3, 1898; Fowler, California
- Died: June 18, 1988 (aged 89); Redwood City, California
- Occupation: Author
- Writing career
- Pen name: Hamlin Daly
- Genre: Fantasy

Edgar Hoffmann Trooper Price (July 3, 1898 – June 18, 1988) was an American writer of popular fiction (he was a self-titled "fictioneer") for the pulp magazine marketplace. He collaborated with H. P. Lovecraft on "Through the Gates of the Silver Key".

== Biography ==
Price was born at Fowler, California. During his early years, he became interested in China as a result of his interactions with a Chinese salesman in his hometown. As a form of punishment, his mother once threatened to leave Price with the salesman. Price did not see this as a punishment. His interest in China also had a sexual aspect. His wife later noted that "Oriental women fascinate [him]".

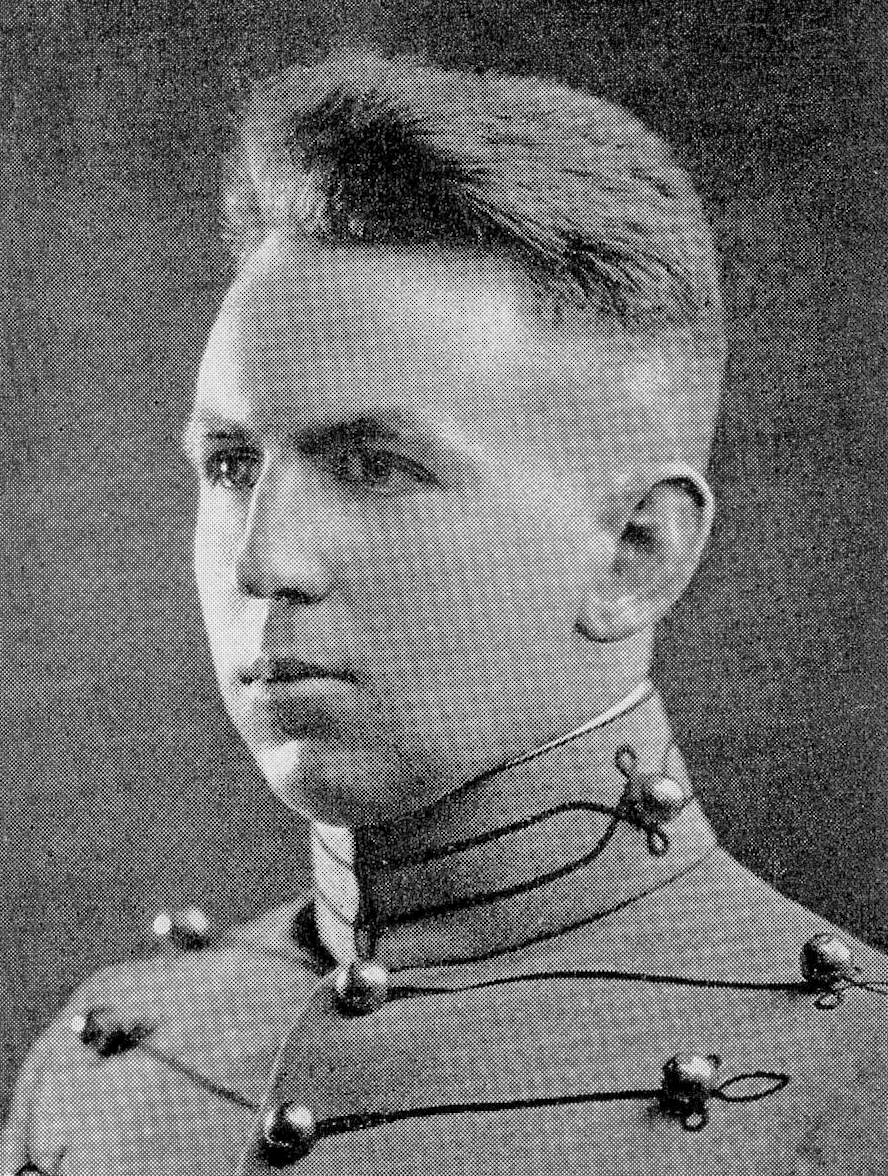
At West Point in 1923

Price served with the American military in Mexico and the Philippines, before being sent to France with the American Expeditionary Force in France during World War I. He was a champion fencer and boxer, an amateur Orientalist, and a student of the Arabic language; science-fiction author Jack Williamson, in his 1984 autobiography Wonder's Child, called E. Hoffmann Price a "real live soldier of fortune".

Originally intending to be a career soldier, Price graduated from the United States Military Academy at West Point in 1923. Starting in 1924, Price took a job with Union Carbide at a plant outside New Orleans. He purchased a typewriter and in his spare time started to write stories. After numerous rejections, he sold his first piece, "Triangle with Variations," to the magazine Droll Stories in 1924, followed quickly by the first of scores of acceptances by Weird Tales, "The Rajah's Gift" (January 1925).

In 1932 Price was fired from his Union Carbide job and turned to writing full time. He moved to Manhattan and began to write extensively for pulp magazines. In his literary career, Hoffmann Price produced fiction for a wide range of publications, from Argosy to Terror Tales, from Speed Detective to Spicy Mystery Stories. Yet he was most readily identified as a Weird Tales writer, one of the group who wrote regularly for editor Farnsworth Wright. Price was part of a loose group of friends that included Lovecraft, Robert E. Howard, and Clark Ashton Smith. Price published 24 solo stories in Weird Tales between 1925 and 1950, plus three collaborations with Otis Adelbert Kline, and his works with Lovecraft, noted above.

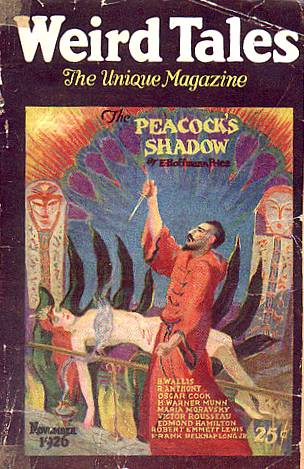
Price's "The Peacock's Shadow" was the cover story in the November 1926 Weird Tales

"The Stranger from Kurdistan", published in 1925, was another early story to appear in Weird Tales. This story which featured a dialogue between a certain personage and Satan, was criticised by some readers as blasphemous but proved popular with Weird Tales readers. (Lovecraft professed to find it especially powerful). "The Infidel's Daughter" (1927), a satire on the Ku Klux Klan, also angered some Southern readers, but Wright defended the story.

Price worked in a range of popular genres including science fiction, horror, crime, and fantasy. However, he was best known for adventure stories with Oriental settings and atmosphere. Price also contributed to Farnsworth Wright's short-lived magazine The Magic Carpet (1930–34), along with Kline, Howard, Smith, and other Weird Tales regulars. For Spicy Western Stories, Price wrote a series about a libidinous cowboy, Simon Bolivar Grimes. For Clues Detective Stories, Price created a series centering on Pâwang Ali, a Malaysian detective in Singapore.

Like many other pulp-fiction writers, Price could not support himself and his family on his income from literature. Living in New Orleans in the 1930s, he worked for a time for the Union Carbide Corporation. Nonetheless, he managed to travel widely and maintain friendships with many other pulp writers, including Kline and Edmond Hamilton. On a trip to Texas in the mid-1930s, Price was the only pulp writer to meet Robert E. Howard face to face. He was also the only man known to have met in person Howard and also H. P. Lovecraft and Clark Ashton Smith (the great "Triumvirate" of Weird Tales writers). Over the course of his long life, Price made reminiscences of many significant figures in pulp fiction, Howard, Lovecraft, and Hamilton among them.

By 1951, he was living in Redwood City, California. His interest in astrology led him to develop a connection with Sri Ram Mahra, a Tibetan theologian.

Late in life, Price experienced a major literary resurgence. In the 1970s and '80s he issued a series of SF, fantasy, and adventure novels, published in paperback; The Devil Wives of Li Fong (1979) is one noteworthy example. He also had published two collections of his pulp stories during his lifetime--Strange Gateways and Far Lands, Other Days. During this period, Price corresponded frequently with the novelist and poet Richard L. Tierney.

Price was one of the first speakers at San Francisco's Maltese Falcon Society in 1981.

He received the World Fantasy Lifetime Achievement Award in 1984. A collection of his literary memoirs, Book of the Dead: Friends of Yesteryear, Fictioneers & Others, was published posthumously in 2001. His writing friends and colleagues included Richard L. Tierney, H. P. Lovecraft, August Derleth, Jack Williamson, Edmond Hamilton, Robert E. Howard, Clark Ashton Smith, Henry Kuttner, Seabury Quinn, Otis Adelbert Kline, Ralph Milne Farley, Robert Spencer Carr, and Farnsworth Wright among others.

Price was a Buddhist and a supporter of the Republican Party.

He died at Redwood City, California, in 1988.

== H. P. Lovecraft ==
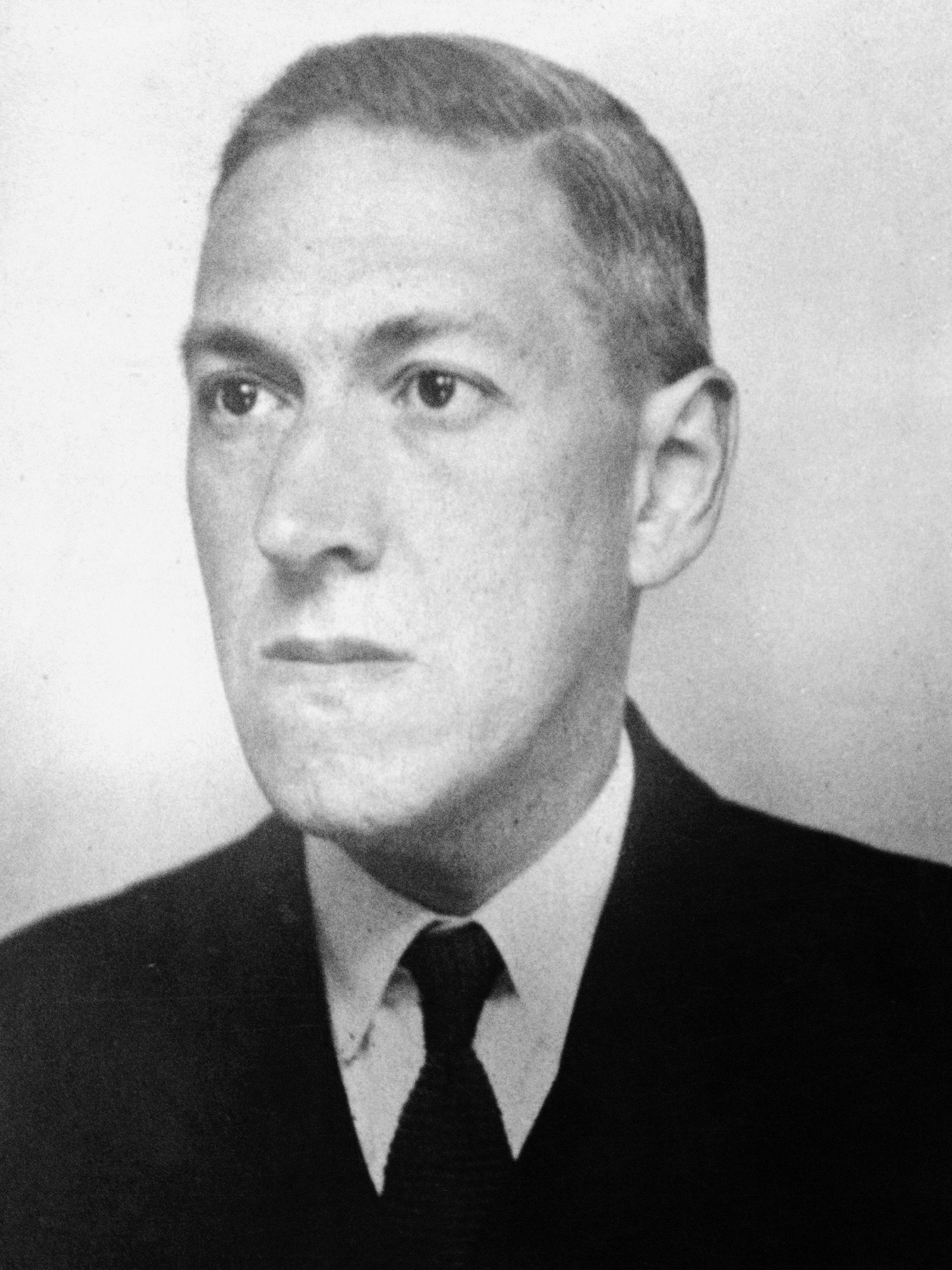
H. P. Lovecraft in June 1934

When Lovecraft visited New Orleans in June 1932, Howard telegraphed Price to alert him to the visitor's presence, and the two writers spent much of the following week together. A disproven myth claims that Price took Lovecraft to a New Orleans brothel, where Lovecraft was amused to find that several of the employees there were fans of his work; the same apocryphal story was originally told about Seabury Quinn sometime earlier.

The meeting of Price and Lovecraft began a correspondence that continued until Lovecraft's death. They even proposed at one time forming a writing team whose output would, "conservatively estimated, run to a million words a month", in Lovecraft's whimsical prediction. They planned to use the pseudonym "Etienne Marmaduke de Marigny" for their collaborations; a similar name was used for a character in "Through the Gates of the Silver Key", the only one of these collaborations to transpire (though they had also collaborated on an earlier piece, the short tale "Tarbis of the Lake").

"Through the Gates of the Silver Key" had its origins in Price's enthusiasm for an earlier Lovecraft tale. "One of my favorite HPL stories was, and still is, 'The Silver Key'," Price wrote in a 1944 memoir. "In telling him of the pleasure I had had in rereading it, I suggested a sequel to account for protagonist Randolph Carter's doings after his disappearance." After convincing an apparently reluctant Lovecraft to collaborate on such a sequel, Price wrote a 6,000-word draft in August 1932; in April 1933, Lovecraft produced a 14,000-word version that left unchanged, by Price's estimate, "fewer than fifty of my original words," though An H. P. Lovecraft Encyclopedia reports that Lovecraft "kept as many of Price's conceptions as possible, as well as some of his language."

In any case, Price was pleased with the result, writing that Lovecraft "was right of course in discarding all but the basic outline. I could only marvel that he had made so much of my inadequate and bungling start." The story appeared under both authors' bylines in the July 1934 issue of Weird Tales; Price's draft was published as "The Lord of Illusion" in Crypt of Cthulhu No. 10 in 1982.

Price visited Lovecraft in Providence in the summer of 1933. When he and a mutual friend showed up at Lovecraft's house with a six-pack of beer, the teetotaling Lovecraft is said to have remarked, "And what are you going to do with so much of it?"

== Bibliography ==
=== Science fiction ===
- Operation Misfit (1980)
- Operation Longlife (1983)
- Operation Exile (1985)
- Operation Isis (1986)

=== Fantasy ===
- The Devil Wives of Li Fong (1979)
- The Jade Enchantress (1982)

=== Collections ===
- Strange Gateways (1967)
- Far Lands, Other Days (1975)
- Three Cliff Cragin Stories (1987)
- Satan's Daughter and Other Tales from the Pulps (2004)
- Valley of the Tall Gods and Other Tales from the Pulps (2006)
- The E. Hoffmann Price Spicy Adventure Megapack (2014)

=== Nonfiction ===
- The Weird Tales Story (1999)
- Book of the Dead: Friends of Yesteryear, Fictioneers and Others (2001)
