= Farnsworth Wright =

American poet and editor

- Born: July 29, 1888; Santa Barbara, California, U.S.
- Died: June 12, 1940 (aged 51); Manhattan, New York City, U.S.
- Education: University of Nevada; University of Washington
- Occupation: Magazine editor
- Spouse: Marjorie J. Zinkie (m. 1929)
- Children: Robert
- Relatives: Paula Raymond
- Writing career
- Language: English
- Genres: Fantasy, pulp fiction

Farnsworth Wright (July 29, 1888 – June 12, 1940) was an American poet and editor who was the editor of the pulp magazine Weird Tales during the magazine's heyday, editing 179 issues from November 1924 to March 1940. Jack Williamson called Wright "the first great fantasy editor".

== Life and career ==
=== Early life and Army service ===
Wright was born in California, and educated at the University of Nevada and the University of Washington. A Washington journalism student, he spent three years on the staff of the University of Washington Daily, ending as managing editor. He acted as managing editor of The Seattle Star on April 25, 1914, when twenty journalism students were handed responsibility for the paper for a day. An honors student, he graduated with a B.A. in journalism in 1914. At the university, he was active in clubs, including serving as president of the Social Democratic Club.

Wright experienced several personal tragedies in his early life of which he would never speak. For example, on July 27, 1913, while bathing in the ocean off Westport, Washington, Wright and his University of Washington roommate, John P. Rauen, were caught in eddying currents. Ironically, Rauen, a "good swimmer," drowned while Wright, who couldn't swim, was rescued "after great difficulties."

His first job was as a reporter with the Seattle Sun, but he was drafted into the U.S. Army in 1917 and served in the infantry in World War I. Wright "served a year as interpreter with the American army." In one reference, his duty was described as "interpreter in the town major's office in Roeze."

Wright's mother taught music and inspired in him his zeal for the classics and for art. For a number of years, he wrote music criticism for Musical America. His music criticism overlapped his overseas duty and, at least into 1928, his editorship of Weird Tales. Wright loved poetry and later encouraged its appearance in Weird Tales.

=== Weird Tales, The Moon Terror and Oriental Stories/Magic Carpet Magazine ===
Wright was working as a music critic for the Chicago Herald and Examiner when he began his association with Weird Tales, founded in 1923. At first serving as chief manuscript reader, he replaced founding editor Edwin Baird in 1924 when the latter was fired by publisher J. C. Henneberger.

During Wright's editorship of Weird Tales (WT), which lasted until 1940, the magazine regularly published the notable authors H. P. Lovecraft, Robert E. Howard and Clark Ashton Smith. Yet Wright had a strained relationship with all three writers, rejecting major works by them — such as Lovecraft's At the Mountains of Madness and The Shadow Over Innsmouth, Howard's "The Frost-Giant's Daughter," and Smith's "The Seven Geases" (which Wright dismissed as just "one geas after another"). He could be both discouraging and encouraging with equal lack of logic. His preference for shorter fiction particularly led him to discourage Lovecraft's, whose best works emerged at longer lengths during the early 1930s. Nevertheless, as Mike Ashley has put it, "Wright developed WT from a relatively routine horror pulp magazine to create what has become a legend."

Wright's wide tastes allowed for an extravagance of fiction, from the Sword and Sorcery of Robert E. Howard, the cosmic fiction of Lovecraft, the occult detective stories of Seabury Quinn, the chinoiseries of E. Hoffmann Price and Frank Owen, the terror tales of Paul Ernst and the space operas and pandimensional adventures of Edmond Hamilton and Nictzin Dyalhis.

Wright also anonymously edited an anthology of WT stories, The Moon Terror (1927), as a bonus for subscribers. The contents were The Moon Terror (full-length novel by A.G. Birch); Ooze by Anthony M. Rud; Penelope by Vincent Starrett and Wright's own "An Adventure in the Fourth Dimension", described as "an uproarious skit on the four-dimensional theories of the mathematicians, and interplanetary stories in general." However, the anthology's contents (unfortunately representative of the worst of magazine's early years) meant the book took years to sell out; for many years during the 1930s Weird Tales carried advertisements for the book at the "reduced price of only fifty cents." Wright also edited a short-lived companion magazine, Oriental Stories (later renamed Magic Carpet Magazine) which lasted from 1930 to 1934.

Wright (nicknamed "Plato" by his writers) was also noteworthy for starting the commercial careers of three important fantasy artists: Margaret Brundage, Virgil Finlay, and Hannes Bok. Each of the three made their first sale to, and had their work first appear in, Weird Tales. Wright was close friends with writers who submitted to the magazine such E. Hoffmann Price (who often helped read the slushpile submissions) and Otis Adelbert Kline.

E.F. Bleiler describes Wright as "an excellent editor who recognized quality work" in his book The Guide to Supernatural Fiction.

Wright also published half a dozen pieces of his own fiction, but his stories are considered unmemorable. His poetry (all published as by "Francis Hard", a pseudonym also used on several of the stories) is considered more delicate, but he limited its appearance. (Most of the poems appeared in the earliest years of Weird Tales).

Weird Tales author Robert Bloch describes Wright as "a tall thin man with a small, thin voice. The latter, together with a persistent palsy, was probably due to the effects of Parkinson's disease, an affliction which had plagued him since wartime military service. An authority on Shakespeare and a former music critic, this soft-spoken, balding, prematurely aged man seemed miscast as editor of a publication featuring bimbos uncovered on its covers and horrors concealed within its pages."

=== Later life and death ===
Farnsworth Wright married Marjorie J. Zinkie (September 1, 1893, Aurora, IL - April 9, 1974, Bellevue, WA) in about 1929. She was a fellow University of Washington graduate and had worked as a librarian in various locales. They had one child, Robert Farnsworth Wright (April 21, 1930, Chicago – March 1, 1993, Bellevue, WA).

Wright had developed Parkinson's disease in 1921; by 1930, he was unable to sign his own letters. He attempted to launch Wright's Shakespeare Library in 1935 with a pulp-format edition of A Midsummer Night's Dream. Despite the illustrations by Virgil Finlay, the book flopped.

Wright's failing health forced him to resign as editor during 1940, and he died later that year. A tribute to him by Seabury Quinn ran in the letters column of the November 1940 issue of Weird Tales. He was succeeded as editor of Weird Tales by Dorothy McIlwraith (who also edited Short Stories magazine).

=== Notable relatives ===
Wright's nephew, David Wright O'Brien (1918–1944), was killed during World War II after a brief but prolific period as a contributor to the Ziff-Davis pulp magazines, including Fantastic Adventures, to which he contributed many humorous fantasies.

Wright's niece was the Hollywood actress Paula Raymond.
