= Maza of the Moon =

1930 novel by Otis Adelbert Kline

- First edition cover
- Author: Otis Adelbert Kline
- Language: English
- Series: Robert Grandon
- Genre: Science fiction novel
- Publisher: A. C. McClurg
- Publication date: 1930
- Publication place: United States
- Pages: 342
- OCLC: 7585374

Maza of the Moon is a science fiction novel by Otis Adelbert Kline. It was first published in book form in 1930 by A C McClurg & Co. The novel was originally serialized in four parts in the magazine Argosy beginning in December 1929.

== Plot synopsis ==
Ted Dustin, an American inventor, seeks to win a prize of one million dollars by being the first person to touch the Moon with an object launched from Earth. He devises a huge gun, which fires upon the surface of the Moon. Shortly thereafter, the Moon fires back, and war breaks out between the planet and its satellite. Using a videophone he invented, Ted hails communication with the Moon. A beautiful woman and her guards first reply, but their transmission is cut off by warlike yellow aliens. Ted eventually heads to the Moon in a spacecraft of his own design, and meets the titular character, who turns out to be the beautiful woman from the transmission, as well as a princess of one of the two groups that inhabit the Moon.

== Publication history ==
- 1929, US, Argosy, Pub date December 1929, magazine serialization in 4 parts, issues dated December 21, 1929 to January 11, 1930
- 1930, US, A. C. McClurg OCLC 7585374, Pub date 1930, hardback, first book publication
- 1965. US, Ace Books, cover by Frank Frazetta

This illustration by Robert A. Graef, depicting Maza and her guards in a firefight, was used as the cover art for the issue of Argosy in which the first installment of Maza of the Moon was published.

== Comic adaptation ==
In 1951 Avon Publications published a comic adaptation in Rocket to the Moon, by Walter B. Gibson (script) and Joe Orlando (art).
