= Starwolf (novel series) =

Trilogy of novels by Edmond Hamilton

Starwolf is a series of three novels by Edmond Hamilton featuring heavy-worlder Morgan Chane. Chane was the son of a human missionary family to a heavier-than-Earth-normal world (higher gravity) of Viking-like aliens. His parents died and left him an orphan to be incorporated into the Starwolf society. As an adult he felt himself to be as much a Starwolf as his alien companions. After a dispute over plunder with a fellow Starwolf (leaving the other Starwolf dead), Chane flees (under threat of death) from Starwolf society. As a fugitive and hiding his ex-Starwolf status (the rest of the galaxy "declares a holiday when a Starwolf is killed"), Chane becomes part of a "Merc" human mercenary group commanded by a Merc named John Dilullo.

== Books ==
=== The Weapon from Beyond (1967) ===
While in intersteallar space Morgan Chane survives a deadly chase by his ex-fellow robbers from Varnan, Starwolves, one of which he killed in a self-defence. On his escape he gets captured by an experienced starship captain, John Dilullo from Earth, who is leading a group of Mercs (mercenaries) with a mission to a planet called Kharal. Dilullo saves him, but quickly learns that he is one of Starwolves, well known robbers who raided almost entire galaxy and whom it's usual to kill on spot. Learning about his trouble, captain Dilullo offers him to join his mission to Kharal and share the reward. As usual for Mercs, the mission promises to be dangerous so in exchange for his help Captain offers to keep the origin of Morgan Chane secret. After landing on Kharal they learn about details, reward, and about enemies of Kharal, the planet Vhol who they are at war with, and who are about to obtain super weapons capable to destroy entire Kharal. Mercs accept their mission and are tasked to find weapon's whereabouts and destroy it before enemies of Kharali can use it. While on the Kharal, Morgan Chane gets jailed for trouble with natives of the planet. While in prison he gest contacted by Captain Dilullo who then tasks Morgan Chane with releaseing a Vhollian officer named Yorolin who was interrogated by Kharalli from the same prison where he was held.

Morgan Chane gets the job done and the team leaves for the Vhol unnoticed with prisoners on board. There, with great effort and trouble they learn about whereabouts of superweapons and set out toward nebulae. Vhol-lans send a cruiser after them. On their way they face Starwolves once again, but luckily appeared Vhol-lans cruiser gets involved and gives a chance for Mercs to escape the battle. By tracing cruiser's path, they reach nebulae's planet where super weapons were expected to be found, but find only enormous intergalactic spaceship wreckage. Mercs captured vhol-lans scientists present at the ship who explained that there was no super weapons and this ship belonged to an ancient powerful alien race called Krii, who accidentally landed on the planet, but survived in stasis for many years and were awaiting their rescuing fellows Krii-s who were expected to appear soon.

Mercs learn that Vhol-lans had one of their cruisers survived the battle with Starwolves and both landed on the planet. They prepared to storm Mercs positions, but soon the fight was interrupted by Krii-s second super-ship appearance. By using some unknown technology Krii-s made all weapons, power plants, and engines on the planet "frozen" and useless. Krii came to save their fellows and what was on the wrecked ship. Once they finished their job, the wreackage gets destroyed by Krii, leaving only trail in the sands and second ship disappears.

Mercs quickly depart for Kharal to get reward and set their way towards Earth.

=== The Closed Worlds (1968) ===
While on Earth, Morgan Chane, captain Dilullo, I. Bollard, and others once again team up to get a new mission. This time they are hired by a wealthy earth businessman and trader James Ashton for $500k to find his brother, Randall Ashton, who disappeared in the Closed Worlds. The latter are notable for being so dangerous and so mysterious that even starwolves do not dare to step their foot on - they have laws that bar them from landing on Arkuu, the planet of the Closed World, where natives do not wellcome anyone. The mercs accept the deadly offer and leave for the Closed Worlds.

The Mercs find evidence of Randall and his crew. With the help of a woman of the Closed Worlds who is in opposition to the policy, set out to find the lost expedition. They are pursued by government forces. The Mercs find Randall, who has re-discovered what the Closed Worlds were trying to hide, an astral projection machine for the mind that allowed the user to wander the universe as long as the body was taken care of. It was destructively addictive and was the reason the Closed Worlds shut themselves off from Galactic Civilization. The Mercs rescue Randall against his will and the woman figures out a way to make use of the machine that would not be destructive.

== Adaptations ==
The series was later adapted into a television series of the same name in Japan, which were in turn edited into two English-language films, both featured in Mystery Science Theater 3000..

The book series were also translated in Russian in 90s.
