= Star Wolf (TV series) =

- Created by: Tsuburaya Productions
- Based on: Starwolf by Edmond Hamilton
- Developed by: Keiichi Abe (Star Wolf); Shukei Nagasaka (Space Hero Star Wolf)
- Directed by: Kiyosumi Fukazawa
- Starring: Tatsuya Azuma; Jô Shishido; Miyuki Tanigawa
- Composer: Norio Maeda
- Country of origin: Japan
- No. of episodes: 24

Production
- Running time: 30 minutes (per episode)
- Production companies: Tsuburaya Productions; Yomiuri Telecasting Corporation

Original release
- Network: NNS (YTV)
- Release: April 2 – September 24, 1978

Star Wolf (Japanese: スターウルフ, Hepburn: Sutā Urufu) is a Japanese science fiction TV series inspired by the novel series of the same name, by American writer Edmond Hamilton. It was produced in 1978 by Tsuburaya Productions.

== Series concept ==
The show is loosely based on the three books in the Starwolf series by American science fiction novelist Edmond Hamilton: The Weapon from Beyond (published in 1967), The Closed Worlds, and World of the Starwolves (both published in 1968). The name of the main character, an Earthman who was raised on the high-gravity planet Varna and developed super-human strength and reflexes, was changed from Morgan Chane to Ken Shinsei. Starting with episode 14, the series was retitled Space Hero Star Wolf (宇宙の勇者 スターウルフ, Uchū no Yūsha Sutā Urufu).

== American adaptation ==
The Japanese series was edited into two feature-length films for American television under the titles Fugitive Alien and Star Force: Fugitive Alien II. They were released directly to television by King Features Entertainment: The first film in 1986, running for 102 minutes, and the sequel in 1987, running for 98 minutes. Both films were featured in season 3 of Mystery Science Theater 3000 (MST3K): Fugitive Alien in episode 10, first shown on August 17, 1991, and Star Force: Fugitive Alien II in episode 18, first shown on November 16, 1991. Of note, both were also featured in the early KTMA era of MST3K, appearing out of order in episodes K12 and K03, respectively, before being revamped for the Comedy Channel era.

== Cast ==
The Japanese Filmography lists the performers as:

- Tatsuya Azuma
- Joe Shishido
- Miyuki Tanigawa
- Chôei Takahashi
- Tsutomu Yukawa
- Hiro Tateyama
- Akihiko Hirata

== Episodes ==
No.	Title	Directed by	Written by	Original release date
Star Wolf
1	"The Wandering Star Wolf" (Japanese: さすらいのスターウルフ)	Kiyosumi Fukazawa	Keiichi Abe	April 2, 1978
2	"Run Across the Galaxy! Bacchus III" (Japanese: 銀河を駆けろ! バッカスIII世)	Kiyosumi Fukazawa	Bunzo Wakatsuki	April 9, 1978
3	"Now, to the Ends of Space" (Japanese: 今 果てしない宇宙へ)	Minoru Kanaya	Hiroyasu Yamaura	April 16, 1978
4	"The Terror of Interstellar Travel" (Japanese: 恐怖の恒星間航行)	Minoru Kanaya	Yoshihisa Araki	April 23, 1978
5	"Super Weapon's Secret" (Japanese: スーパーウェポンの秘密)	Kiyosumi Fukazawa	Keiichi Abe	April 30, 1978
6	"The Dangerous Space Guide" (Japanese: 危険な宇宙案内人)	Kiyosumi Fukazawa	Bunzo Wakatsuki	May 7, 1978
7	"The Space of Love and Hatred" (Japanese: 愛と憎しみの宇宙)	Minoru Kanaya	Hiroyasu Yamaura	May 14, 1978
8	"The Black Hole That Calls Death" (Japanese: 死を呼ぶブラックホール)	Minoru Kanaya	Hiroyasu Yamaura	May 21, 1978
9	"A Cosmic Pageant of Heat and Light" (Japanese: 熱と光の宇宙ページェント)	Kiyosumi Fukazawa	Bunzo Wakatsuki	May 28, 1978
10	"A Fierce Battle That Sets the Space Ablaze" (Japanese: 宇宙を燃やす大激戦)	Kiyosumi Fukazawa	Yoshihisa Araki	June 4, 1978
11	"Minefield on an Unknown Planet" (Japanese: 未知の星の地雷原)	Minoru Kanaya	Keiichi Abe	June 11, 1978
12	"The Lives Risked on a Planetary Missile" (Japanese: 惑星ミサイルに賭けた命)	Minoru Kanaya	Bunzo Wakatsuki	June 18, 1978
13	"0 Seconds Before the Big Explosion" (Japanese: 大爆発0秒前)	Minoru Kanaya	Yoshihisa Araki	June 25, 1978
Space Hero Star Wolf
14	"A Black Dragon Floating in Space" (Japanese: 宇宙に浮ぶ黒い竜)	Kiyosumi Fukazawa	Shukei Nagasaka	July 2, 1978
15	"A Terrifying Plunge into a Meteoroid Swarm" (Japanese: いん石群へ恐怖の突入)	Kiyosumi Fukazawa	Shukei Nagasaka	July 9, 1978
16	"Symonite of Two Faces" (Japanese: 二つの顔のサイモナイト)	Minoru Kanaya	Shukei Nagasaka	July 16, 1978
17	"Come! The Showdown on the Black Star" (Japanese: いざ! 黒い星の決戦)	Minoru Kanaya	Shukei Nagasaka	July 30, 1978
18	"Panic! The Planet Whose Air Was Stolen" (Japanese: パニック! 空気を盗まれた惑星)	Kiyosumi Fukazawa	Bunzo Wakatsuki	August 6, 1978
19	"The Red Meteor Targeting Ken" (Japanese: ケンを狙う赤い流星)	Kiyosumi Fukazawa	Bunzo Wakatsuki	August 13, 1978
20	"Solid Gold Robot GC301" (Japanese: 純金ロボットGC301)	Minoru Kanaya	Shukei Nagasaka	August 20, 1978
21	"The Tragic Space Dinosaur Nipopo" (Japanese: 悲劇の宇宙恐竜ニポポ)	Minoru Kanaya	Shukei Nagasaka	September 3, 1978
22	"Scorching Hell: Save the Subterraneans!" (Japanese: 灼熱地獄 地底人を救え!)	Kiyosumi Fukazawa	Hiroyasu Yamaura	September 10, 1978
23	"The Mysterious Planet of the Half-Beastmen" (Japanese: 謎の惑星半獣人)	Kiyosumi Fukazawa	Toyohiro Ando	September 17, 1978
24	"A Fateful Showdown in Deep Space!" (Japanese: 大宇宙 宿命の対決!)	Kiyosumi Fukazawa	Shukei Nagasaka	September 24, 1978
