= Otis Adelbert Kline =

American novelist (1891–1946)

- Otis Adelbert Kline, date unknown
- Born: July 1, 1891; Chicago, Illinois, US
- Died: October 24, 1946 (aged 55); Short Beach, Connecticut, US
- Occupations: Novelist, literary agent
- Writing career
- Genre: Science fiction

Otis Adelbert Kline (July 1, 1891 – October 24, 1946) was an American songwriter, adventure novelist and literary agent during the pulp era. Much of his work first appeared in the magazine Weird Tales. Kline was an amateur orientalist and a student of Arabic, like his friend and sometime collaborator, E. Hoffmann Price.

== Kline and Burroughs ==
Kline is best known for an apocryphal literary feud with fellow author Edgar Rice Burroughs, in which he supposedly raised the latter's ire by producing close imitations (The Planet of Peril (1929) and two sequels) of Burroughs's Martian novels, though set on Venus; Burroughs, the story goes, then retaliated by writing his own Venus novels, whereupon Kline responded with an even more direct intrusion on Burroughs's territory by boldly setting two novels on Mars. Kline's jungle adventure stories, reminiscent of Burroughs's Tarzan tales, have also been cited as evidence of the conflict. While the two authors did write the works in question, the theory that they did so in contention with each other is supported only circumstantially, by the resemblance and publication dates of the works themselves. The feud theory was originally set forth in a fan press article, "The Kline-Burroughs War," by Donald A. Wollheim (Science Fiction News, November, 1936), and afterward given wider circulation by Sam Moskowitz in his book Explorers of the Infinite (1963). Richard A. Lupoff debunked the case in his book Edgar Rice Burroughs: Master of Adventure (1965). Among the evidence cited by Lupoff discounting the feud: (1) no comment from either writer acknowledging the feud is documented, and (2) family members of the two authors have no recollection of ever hearing them mention it. In response to Lupoff's investigations, Moskowitz identified his original source as Wollheim's article, while Wollheim stated, when questioned on the source of his own information: "I made it up!"

== Kline and Weird Tales ==
Kline was an assistant editor at Weird Tales from its inception. He contributed numerous stories to the magazine and edited a single issue — that for May–July 1924 (which also contained his short story "The Malignant Entity").

== Literary agent ==
In the mid-1930s Kline largely abandoned writing to concentrate on his career as a literary agent (most famously for fellow Weird Tales author Robert E. Howard, pioneer sword and sorcery writer and creator of Conan the Barbarian). Kline represented Howard from the spring of 1933 till Howard's death in June 1936, and continued to act as literary agent for Howard's estate thereafter. It has been suggested that Kline may have completed Howard's "planetary romance" Almuric, which he submitted to Weird Tales for posthumous publication in 1939, although this claim is disputed.

== Bibliography ==
Kline's novels normally received serial publication in magazines before their release in book form. The Mars novels appeared in Argosy, and The Port of Peril in Weird Tales (as Buccaneers of Venus).

=== Venus series ===
1. The Planet of Peril (1929)
2. The Prince of Peril (1930)
3. The Port of Peril (1932)

=== Mars series ===
1. The Swordsman of Mars (1933)
2. The Outlaws of Mars (1933)

=== Jan of the Jungle ===
1. The Call of the Savage, or Jan of the Jungle (1931)
2. Jan in India (1935)

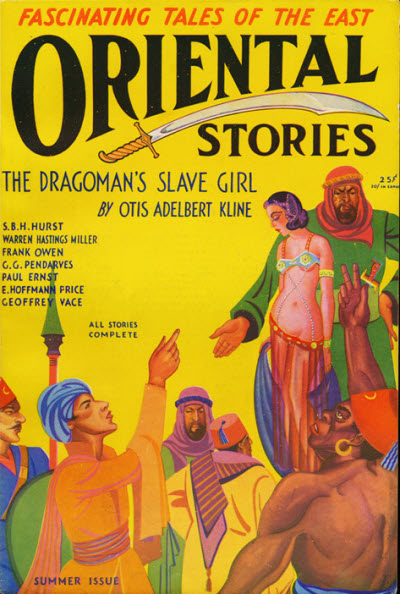
"The Dragoman's Slave Girl" was originally published in the Summer 1931 issue of Oriental Stories

=== Other novels and stories ===
- "The Secret Kingdom," Amazing Stories 3-part serial (October, November, December 1929), with brother Allen S. Kline
- Maza of the Moon, Argosy 4-part serial (1930)
- "The Man Who Limped," Oriental Stories (October 1930) [Hamed the Atar/Dragoman series]
- "Spawn of the Comet," Argosy (12 July 1930)
- "The Thing That Walked in the Rain," Amazing Stories (March 1931)
- "The Dragoman's Revenge," Oriental Stories (February 1931) [Hamed the Atar/Dragoman series]
- "The Dragoman's Secret," Oriental Stories (Spring 1931) [Hamed the Atar/Dragoman series]
- "The Dragoman's Slave Girl," Oriental Stories (Summer 1931) [Hamed the Atar/Dragoman series]
- "The Dragoman's Confession," Oriental Stories (Summer 1932) [Hamed the Atar/Dragoman series]
- "The Dragoman's Jest," Oriental Stories (1932) with E. Hoffman Price [Hamed the Atar/Dragoman series]
- "The Dragoman's Pilgrimage," Magic Carpet Magazine (January 1933) [Hamed the Atar/Dragoman series]
- "The Fang of Amm Jemel," Argosy (9 March 1935)
- "The Murder Room," New Detective (May 1935)
- "The Iron World," Thrilling Wonder Stories (August 1938)
- "Stolen Centuries," Thrilling Wonder Stories (June 1939)
- Satans on Saturn, 5-part serial, Argosy (November 1940), with E. Hoffmann Price
- "Meteor Men of Mars," Planet Stories (Winter 1942), with Harry Cord

==== Weird Tales stories ====
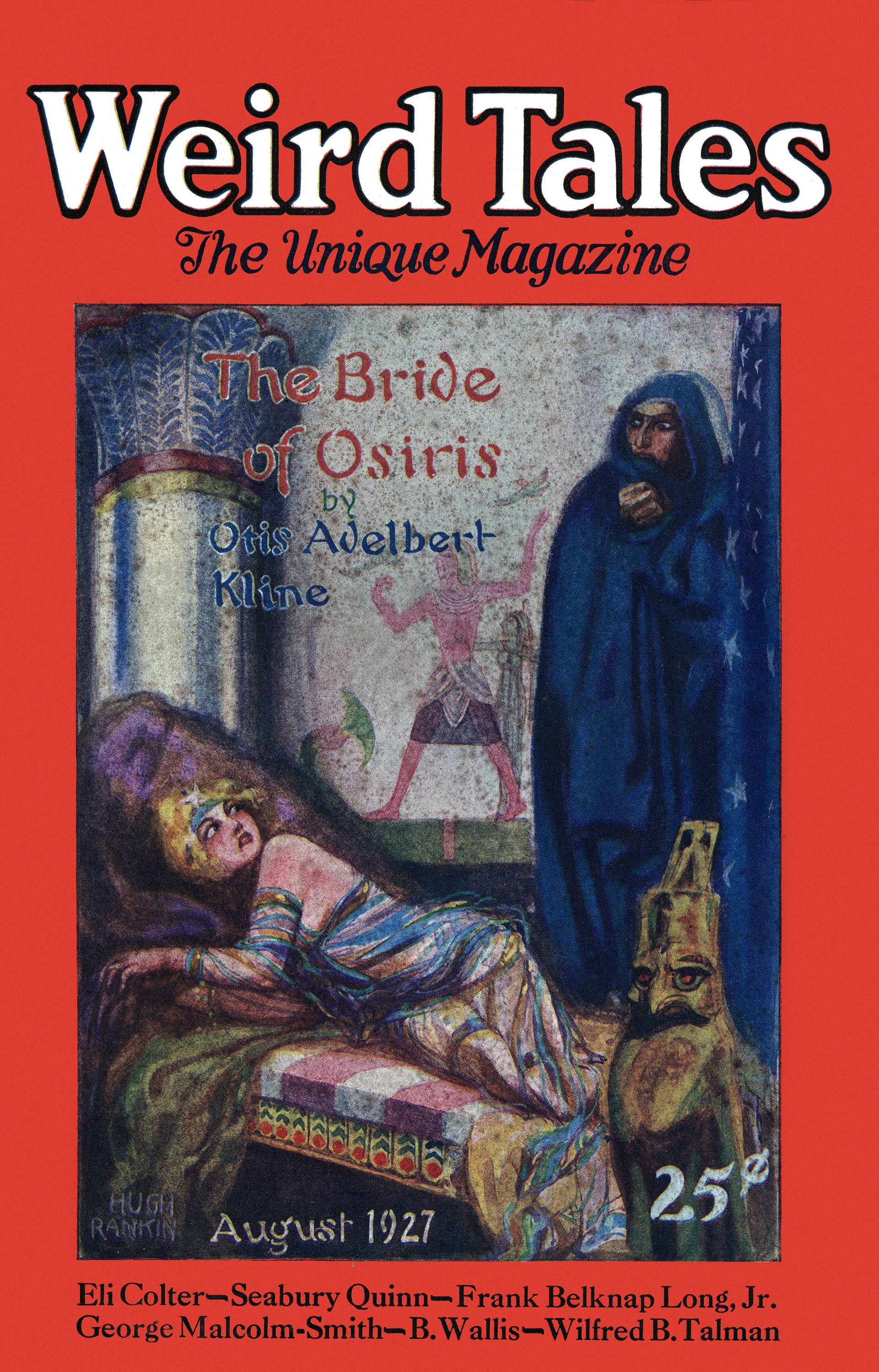
The serialization of Kline's novella "The Bride of Osiris" began in the August 1927 Weird Tales

- "The Thing of a Thousand Shapes" 2-part serial (March, April 1923)
- "The Phantom Wolfhound" (June 1923)
- "The Corpse on the Third Slab" (July/August 1923)
- "The Cup of Blood" (September 1923)
- "The Malignant Entity" (May/July 1924)
- "The Phantom Rider" (November 1924)
- "The Bride of Osiris" 3-part serial (August, September, October 1927)
- "The Demon of Tlaxpam" (January 1929)
- "The Bird-People" (January 1930)
- "Thirsty Blade" (February 1930), with E. Hoffmann Price
- "Tam, Son of the Tiger" 6-part serial (June–December 1931)
- "Midnight Madness" (April 1932)
- "Lord of the Lamia" 3-part serial (March–May 1935)
- "The Cyclops of Xoatl" (December 1936), with E. Hoffmann Price
- "Spotted Satan" (January 1940), with E. Hoffmann Price
- "Return of the Dead" (July 1943), with Frank Belknap Long

=== Collections ===
- The Man Who Limped and Other Stories (1946)
- The Dragoman's Revenge (2007)

=== Nonfiction ===
- "Writing the Fantastic Story," The Writer, January 1931
- "The Modern Detective Story," The Author & Journalist, July 1937
- "I Have a Radio Mind," True Mystic Science, December 1938
- "What Is the Source of Prophecy?," True Mystic Science, April 1939
- "The Blind Shall 'See'," Tomorrow, November 1941
