= Edmond Hamilton =

American science fiction writer (1904–1977)

- Hamilton c. 1956
- Born: Edmond Moore Hamilton; October 21, 1904; Youngstown, Ohio, U.S.
- Died: February 1, 1977 (aged 72); Lancaster, California, U.S.
- Occupation: Writer
- Spouse: Leigh Brackett (m. 1946)
- Writing career
- Genres: Science fiction, horror, fantasy, crime fiction, superhero fiction

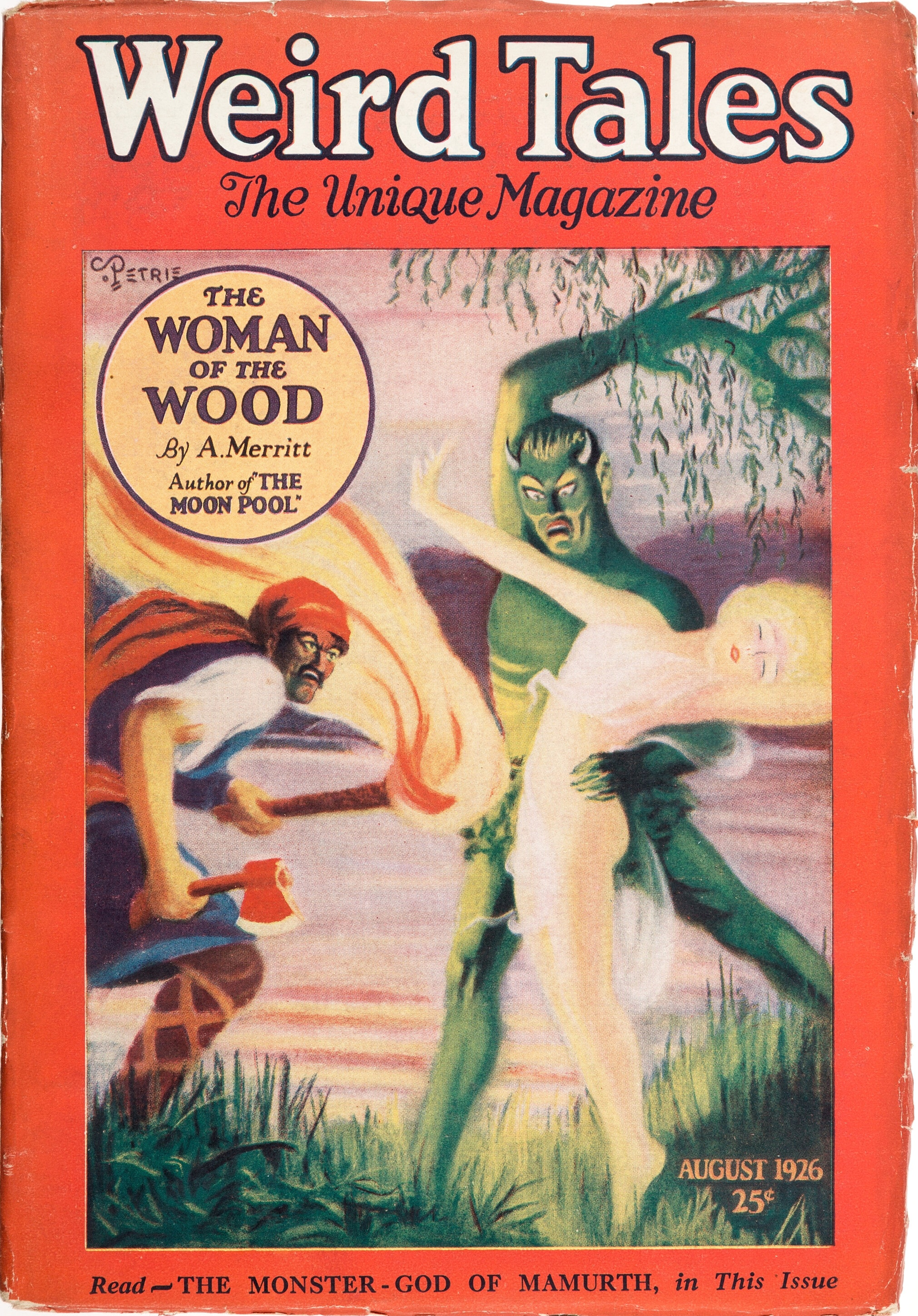
The August 1926 Weird Tales featured Hamilton's first published story.

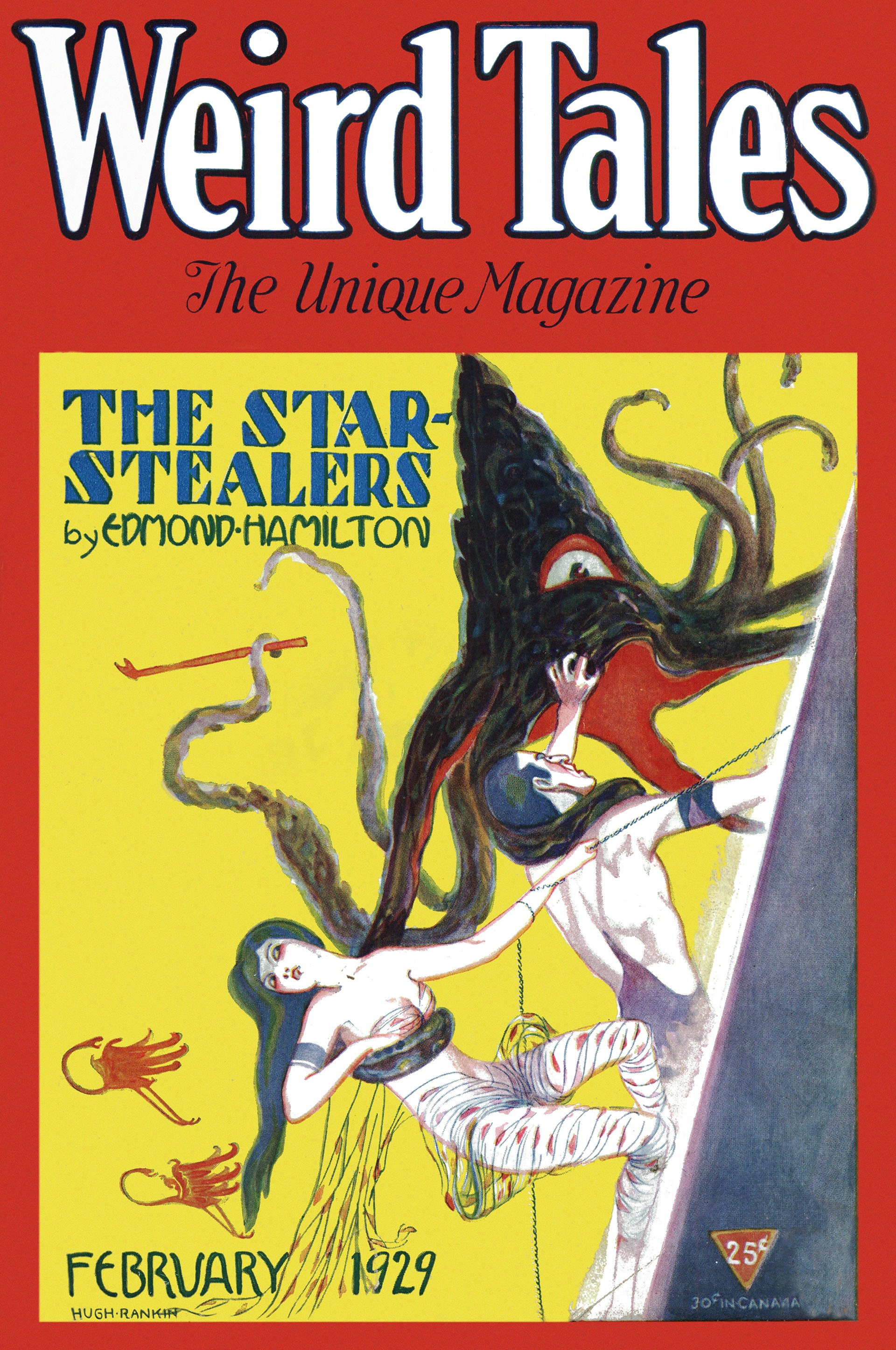
"The Star-Stealers" was first published in the February 1929 issue of Weird Tales.

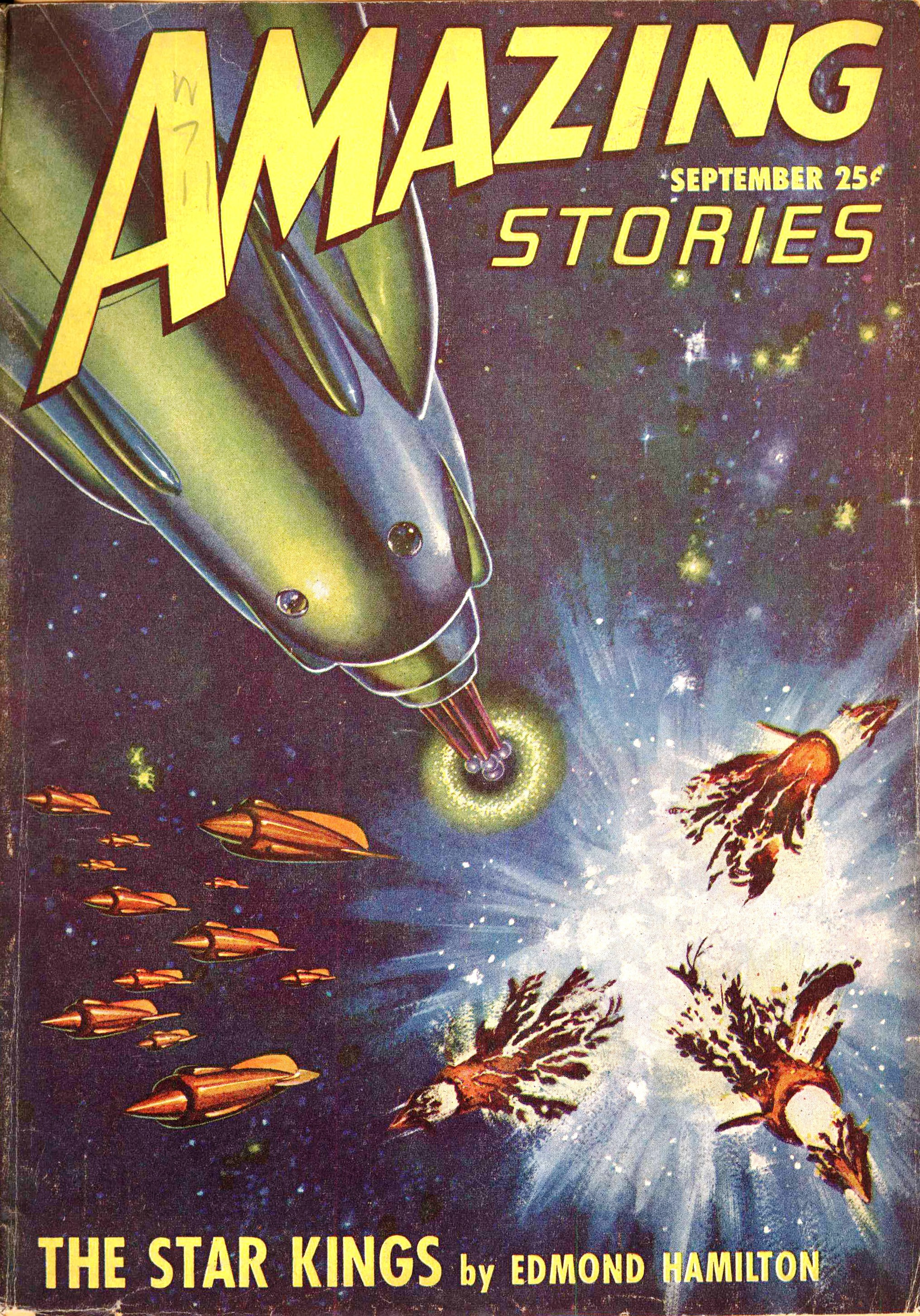
The first "Star Kings" story was cover-featured on the September 1947 issue of Amazing Stories.

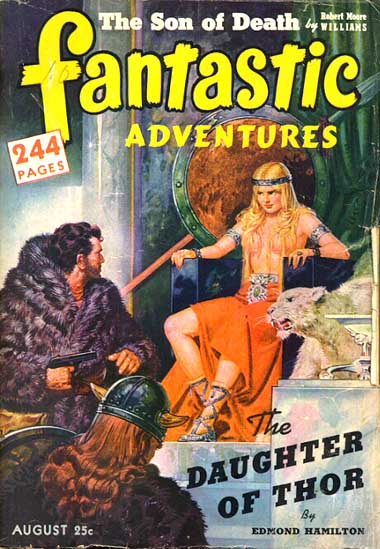
Hamilton's novella The Daughter of Thor was the cover story for the August 1942 issue of Fantastic Adventures.

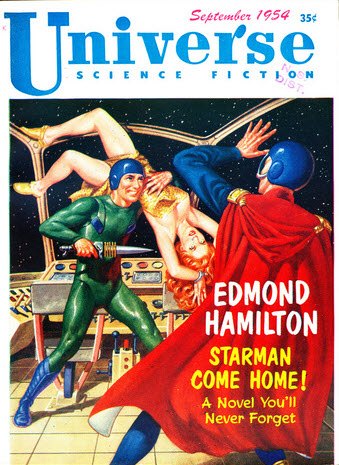
Hamilton's short novel Starman Come Home, the cover story in the September 1954 issue of Universe Science Fiction, was published in book form as The Sun Smasher five years later.

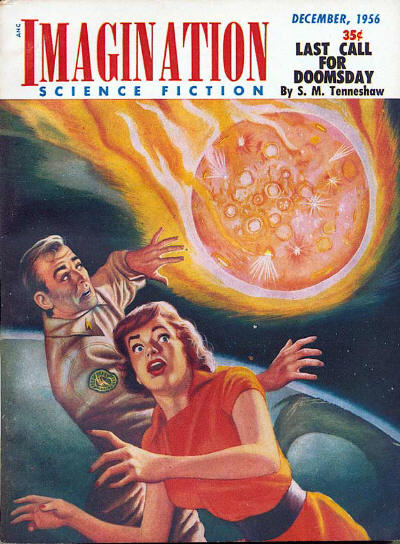
Hamilton's novella Last Call for Doomsday!, written for Imagination under the house name "S. M. Tenneshaw", has never been included in an authorized Hamilton collection.

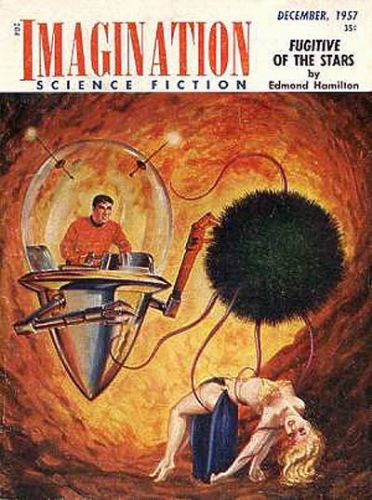
Hamilton's short novel Fugitive of the Stars, cover-featured on the December 1957 issue of Imagination, was revised and published in an Ace Double in 1965.

Edmond Moore Hamilton (October 21, 1904 – February 1, 1977) was an American writer of science fiction during the mid-twentieth century. He is known for writing most of the Captain Future stories.

== Early life ==
Born in Youngstown, Ohio, he was raised there and in nearby New Castle, Pennsylvania. Something of a child prodigy, he graduated from high school and entered Westminster College in New Wilmington, Pennsylvania at the age of 14, but dropped out at 17.

== Writing career ==
Edmond Hamilton's career as a science fiction writer began with the publication of "The Monster God of Mamurth", a short story, in the August 1926 issue of Weird Tales. Hamilton quickly became a central member of the remarkable group of Weird Tales writers assembled by editor Farnsworth Wright, that included H. P. Lovecraft and Robert E. Howard. Weird Tales would publish 79 works of fiction by Hamilton from 1926 to 1948, making him one of the magazine's most prolific contributors. Hamilton became a friend and associate of several Weird Tales veterans, including E. Hoffmann Price and Otis Adelbert Kline; most notably, he struck up a 20-year friendship with close contemporary Jack Williamson, as Williamson records in his 1984 autobiography Wonder's Child. In the late 1930s Weird Tales printed several striking fantasy tales by Hamilton, most notably "He That Hath Wings" (July 1938), one of his most popular and frequently reprinted pieces. Hamilton wrote one of the first hardcover compilations of what would eventually come to be known as the science fiction genre, The Horror on The Asteroid and Other Tales of Planetary Horror (1936). The book comprises the following stories: "The Horror on the Asteroid", "The Accursed Galaxy", "The Man Who Saw Everything" ("The Man With the X-Ray Eyes"), "The Earth-Brain", "The Monster-God of Mamurth", and "The Man Who Evolved".

Through the late 1920s and early 1930s Hamilton wrote for all of the science fiction pulp magazines then publishing, and contributed horror and thriller stories to various other magazines as well. He was popular as an author of space opera, a subgenre he created along with E. E. Smith, and which earned him nicknames like “The World Wrecker”. His story "The Island of Unreason" (Wonder Stories, May 1933) won the first Jules Verne Prize as the best science fiction story of the year (this was the first science fiction prize awarded by the votes of fans, a precursor of the later Hugo Awards). In the later 1930s, in response to the economic strictures of the Great Depression, he also wrote detective and crime stories. Always prolific in stereotypical pulp magazine fashion, Hamilton sometimes saw four or five of his stories appear in a single month in these years; the February 1937 issue of the pulp Popular Detective featured three Hamilton stories, one under his name and two under pseudonyms. In the 1940s, Hamilton was the primary force behind the Captain Future franchise, a science fiction pulp designed for juvenile readers that won him many fans, but diminished his reputation in later years when science fiction moved away from space opera. Hamilton was associated with an extravagant, romantic, high-adventure style of science fiction, perhaps best represented by his 1947 novel The Star Kings.

In 1942 Hamilton began writing for DC Comics, specializing in stories for their characters Superman and Batman. His first comics story was "Bandits in Toyland" in Batman #11 (June–July 1942). He wrote the short-lived science fiction series Chris KL-99 in Strange Adventures, loosely based on Captain Future. He and artist Sheldon Moldoff created Batwoman in Detective Comics #233 (July 1956). Hamilton co-created Space Ranger in Showcase #15 (July–Aug. 1958) with Gardner Fox and Bob Brown. He also wrote the well-regarded three-part story "The Last Days of Superman" in Superman #156 (Oct 1962). Hamilton was also among the first regular writers for Legion of Super-Heroes, where he created Timber Wolf, the Time Trapper, and the Legion of Substitute Heroes, among other characters. "The Clash of Cape and Cowl" in World's Finest Comics #153 (Nov. 1965) is the source of an Internet meme in which Batman slaps Robin. Hamilton retired from comics with the publication of "The Cape and Cowl Crooks" in World's Finest Comics #159 (August 1966).

In 1969, the Macfadden/Bartell Corporation published a collection of short science fiction stories "Alien Earth and Other Stories" (520–00219–075), where Hamilton's 1949 "Alien Earth" was featured along with novelettes by Isaac Asimov, Robert Bloch, Ray Bradbury, Arthur C. Clarke and others.

== Marriage and collaboration ==
Hamilton met fellow science fiction author and screenwriter Leigh Brackett for the first time in the summer of 1940, but lost track of her during the war years. They met once again at the Hollywood Roosevelt Hotel, where she and Ray Bradbury invited him to the coast in 1946. On December 31, 1946, Hamilton married her in San Gabriel, California, and moved with her to Kinsman, Ohio. Afterward he would produce some of his best work including his novels The Star of Life (1947), The Valley of Creation (1948), City at World's End (1951) and The Haunted Stars (1960). In this more mature phase of his career, Hamilton moved away from the romantic and fantastic elements of his earlier fiction to create some unsentimental and realistic stories, such as "What's It Like Out There?" (Thrilling Wonder Stories, December 1952), his single most frequently-reprinted and anthologized work.

Though Hamilton and Leigh Brackett worked side by side for a quarter-century, they rarely shared the task of authorship; their single formal collaboration, Stark and the Star Kings, originally intended for Harlan Ellison's The Last Dangerous Visions, would not appear in print until 2005. It has been speculated that when Brackett temporarily abandoned science fiction for screenwriting in the early 1960s, Hamilton did an uncredited revision and expansion of two early Brackett stories, "Black Amazon of Mars" and "Queen of the Martian Catacombs" — revised texts were published as the novellas People of the Talisman and The Secret of Sinharat (1964).

Hamilton died in February 1977 in Lancaster, California, of complications following kidney surgery. In the year before his death, Toei Animation had launched production of an anime adaptation of his Captain Future novels and Tsuburaya Productions adapted Star Wolf into a tokusatsu series; both series were aired on Japanese television in 1978. The Captain Future adaptation was later exported to Europe, winning Hamilton a new and different fan base than the one that had acclaimed him half a century before, notably in France, Italy and Germany.

Joint interviews of Brackett and Hamilton by Dave Truesdale were published in Tangent (Summer 1976), and by Darrell Schweitzer in Amazing Stories (January 1978), — the latter published several months after Hamilton's death, but conducted "much earlier", Truesdale attributes to Schweitzer.

== Edmond Hamilton / Leigh Brackett Day ==
On July 18, 2009, Kinsman, Ohio, "celebrat[ed] Edmond Hamilton Day, honoring 'The Dean of Science Fiction' and Kinsman resident".

== Selected works ==
=== Captain Future ===
1. Captain Future and the Space Emperor (1940)
2. Calling Captain Future (1940)
3. Captain Future's Challenge (1940)
4. The Triumph of Captain Future (1940), reprinted as Galaxy Mission
5. Captain Future and the Seven Space Stones (1941)
6. Star Trail to Glory (1941)
7. The Magician of Mars (1941)
8. The Lost World of Time (1941)
9. Quest Beyond the Stars (1942)
10. Outlaws of the Moon (1942)
11. The Comet Kings (1942)
12. Planets in Peril (1942)
13. The Face of the Deep (1943)
14. Worlds to Come (1943)
15. Star of Dread (1943)
16. Magic Moon (1944)
17. The Tenth Planet (1969)
18. Red Sun of Danger (1945), reprinted as Danger Planet
19. Outlaw World (1946)

Volumes #14 (Worlds to Come, 1943) and #17 (Days of Creation, 1944) were written by Joseph Samachson while #20, The Solar Invasion (1946) was by Manly Wade Wellman. The main series was followed by a set of seven novelettes from 1950 to 1951: "The Return of Captain Future", "Children of the Sun", "The Harpers of Titan", "Pardon my Iron Nerves", "Moon of the Unforgotten", "Earthmen No More" and "Birthplace of Creation".

=== Interstellar Patrol ===
A space opera sequence based on the seminal "Crashing Suns". With the exception of "The Sun People", the stories were assembled as Crashing Suns in 1965.

1. "Crashing Suns" (1928)
2. The Star-Stealers (1929)
3. Within the Nebula (1929)
4. Outside the Universe (1929)
5. The Comet-Drivers (1930)
6. "The Sun People" (1930)
7. "The Cosmic Cloud" (1930)

=== The Star Kings ===
A space opera sequence: the first, The Star Kings, is a reworking of The Prisoner of Zenda while Return to the Stars is a fix-up of four stories: "Kingdoms of the Stars", "The Shores of Infinity", "The Broken Stars" and "The Horror from the Magellanic". A crossover between this universe and Brackett's, "Stark and the Star Kings", was released in 2005, having originally been submitted to The Last Dangerous Visions. Two further stories in the same universe, "The Star Hunter" (1958) and "The Tattooed Man" (1957), were reissued in 2014 as The Last of the Star Kings.

1. The Star Kings (1949), originally published in Amazing Stories in 1947, and as a paperback in 1950 under the title Beyond the Moon
2. Return to the Stars (1968)
3. "Stark and the Star Kings" (2005)
4. The Last of the Star Kings (2014)

=== Starwolf ===
Interstellar adventure with mercenary Morgan Chane.

1. The Weapon from Beyond (1967)
2. The Closed Worlds (1968)
3. World of the Starwolves (1968)

=== Other novels ===
title	year	comment
The Abysmal Invaders	1929
The Life-Masters	1929
The Sea Horror	1929
The Invisible Master	1930
The Space Visitors	1930
Evans of the Earth Guard	1930
The Man Who Saw the Future	1930
World Atavism	1930
The Sargasso of Space	1931
The Door into Infinity	1936
The Fire Princess	1938
The World with a Thousand Moons	1942
Forgotten World	1945
Come Home from Earth	1946
Proxy Planeteers	1947
The Knowledge Machine	1948
A Yank at Valhalla	1950
The Monsters of Juntonheim	-	reprint of A Yank at Valhalla
Tharkol, Lord of the Unknown	1950
The Prisoner of Mars	-	reprint of Tharkol, Lord of the Unknown
City at World's End	1951
Last Call for Doomsday!	1956
Citadel of the Star Lords	1956
The Legion of Lazarus	1956
The Sinister Invasion	1957
The Sun Smasher	1959
Starman Come Home	-	reprint of The Sun Smasher
The Star of Life	1959
The Man Who Missed the Moon	-	reprint of The Star of Life
The Haunted Stars	1960
Battle for the Stars	1961
The Stars, My Brothers	1962
The Valley of Creation	1948
Fugitive of the Stars	1965
Doomstar	1966
The Lake of Life	1978
The Universe Wreckers. Armchair Fiction. 2015.	2015

=== Collections ===
- The Horror on the Asteroid and Other Tales of Planetary Horror (1936)
- Murder in the Clinic (1946)
- What's It Like Out There? and Other Stories (1974)
- The Best of Edmond Hamilton (Doubleday Science Fiction Book Club, April 1977), edited and introduced by Leigh Brackett
- Kaldar: World of Antares (1998)
- The Vampire Master and Other Tales of Terror (2000)
- Stark and the Star Kings (2005), Leigh Brackett and Hamilton
- Two Worlds of Edmond Hamilton (2008)
- The Sargasso of Space and Two Others (2009)
- Twilight of the Gods (2020)
- The Avenger from Atlantis (2021)

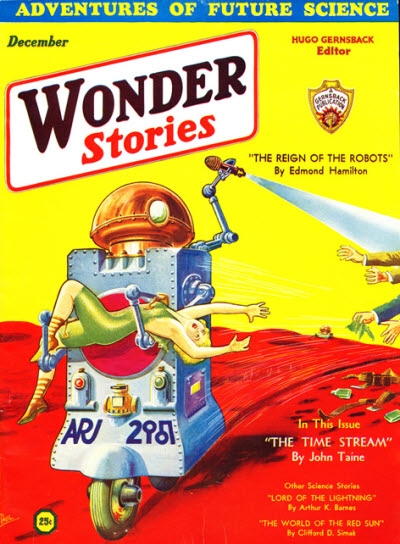
Frank R. Paul's cover for the December 1931 Wonder Stories, illustrating Hamilton's "The Reign of the Robots", was revived in 2013 for the cover of a volume of Hamilton's collected fiction

=== Collected works ===
In 2009, Haffner Press released the first two books in a program to collect all of Hamilton's prose work. A volume (the first of six) collecting the first four Captain Future novels also appeared at the same time. Early in 2010, additional volumes were announced.

- The Metal Giants and Others, The Collected Edmond Hamilton, Volume One ISBN 978-1893887312 (2009)
- The Star-Stealers: The Complete Tales of the Interstellar Patrol, The Collected Edmond Hamilton, Volume Two ISBN 978-1893887336 (2009)
- The Universe Wreckers, The Collected Edmond Hamilton, Volume Three ISBN 978-1893887411 (2010)
- The Reign of the Robots, The Collected Edmond Hamilton, Volume Four ISBN 978-1893887657 (2013)
- The Six Sleepers, The Collected Edmond Hamilton, Volume Five ISBN 978-1-893887-72-5
- The Collected Captain Future, Volume One ISBN 978-1893887350 (2009)
- The Collected Captain Future, Volume Two ISBN 978-1893887404 (2010)
- The Collected Captain Future, Volume Three ISBN 978-1893887749 (2014)

=== Comic books ===
==== DC Comics ====
- Action Comics #119, 135, 137–138, 147–148, 151, 167, 186, 189, 191, 223, 229, 234, 239, 293–294, 300–301, 303, 309, 314, 318–319, 321, 327, 329–330, 336, 338–339 (1948–1966)
- Adventure Comics #144–146, 149–150, 156, 161, 167, 172, 240 (Superboy); #306–319, 321–322, 324–325, 327, 332, 334–337, 339, 341–345 (Legion of Super-Heroes) (1949–1966)
- Batman #11, 38, 76–78, 83, 85–86, 88, 91, 93–95, 98–99, 101, 104, 109–112 (1942–1957)
- Detective Comics #91, 124, 127, 133, 135, 158, 165, 198, 201, 203, 211, 215–217, 225–226, 231, 233–234, 241, 243, 245, 251 (1944–1958)
- Green Lantern #18 (1945)
- Mystery in Space #2, 4, 30, 34–35, 37–38 (1951–1957)
- Showcase #15–16 (Space Ranger) (1958)
- Strange Adventures #1–5, 7, 9, 11, 13, 15–16, 55–56, 63, 67, 69, 72–75, 77, 79 (1950–1957)
- Superboy #1, 8–9, 18, 21–22, 24–25, 27, 103–104, 106, 119–120, 123 (1949–1965)
- Superman #50, 52, 57, 63–64, 68, 70–72, 74–76, 78–81, 90, 102, 105–106, 109, 119, 148, 153–159, 161, 163–164, 166–168, 171–172, 174–175, 181 (1948–1965)
- Superman's Girl Friend, Lois Lane #15, 21, 54, 56–57 (1960–1965)
- Superman's Pal Jimmy Olsen #64, 66–67, 69, 71, 85 (1962–1965)
- World's Finest Comics #34–35, 37–39, 41, 46, 57, 62–63, 73, 76–82, 84–86, 88–92, 94, 96, 141–153, 155–159 (1948–1966)

== Sources ==
- Moskowitz, Sam (1966). Seekers of Tomorrow: Masters of Modern Science Fiction. Cleveland, OH: World Publishing Co. OCLC 633053738.
  - Reprint (1973). Westport, CT: Hyperion Press. ISBN 9780883551295. OCLC 213785300.
- Gombert, Richard W. (2009). World Wrecker: An Annotated Bibliography of Edmond Hamilton. Borgo Press imprint of Rockville, MD: Wildside. ISBN 9781434457264. OCLC 558840699.
- Cadigan, Glen, "Writer of Two Worlds: The Science-Fiction & Comicbook Careers of Edmond Hamilton," Alter Ego #187, May 2024
