= Space Relations =

1973 novel published by Donald Barr

- First edition
- Author: Donald Barr
- Cover artist: Guy Fleming
- Language: English
- Genre: Science fiction
- Set in: Future
- Published: 17 September 1973
- Publisher: Charterhouse
- Publication place: United States
- Pages: 249
- ISBN: 9780860000242
- OCLC: 856626
- LC Class: PS 3552 A7317 S63

Space Relations: A Slightly Gothic Interplanetary Tale is a space opera novel by Donald Barr, originally published on 17 September 1973 by Charterhouse and distributed by McKay. It was reprinted by Fawcett Crest Books in February 1975. It is one of only two novels Barr is known to have written, the other being A Planet in Arms.

== Plot ==
In the future, humans have formed an intergalactic empire ruled by aristocrats. During a time of war with the Plith, an empire of ant-like alien bug people, ambassador John Craig, a formerly Liberal Earth man in his 30s, is dispatched to the strategically important planet Kossar, a human colony that was settled by the Carlyle Society as a place of exile for political extremists and now is ruled by an oligarchical high council of seven nobles, each of whom is in charge of a different domain with its own traditions. Their boredom and absolute power have driven them to madness, to the point that Kossar's entry into the empire has been stymied by the Man-Inhabited Planets Treaty's clause (written by Craig) against alliances with slave owning societies, due to its practice of kidnapping humans to become illegal playthings of the galaxy's super-rich.

Craig, who now is campaigning to bring Kossar into the empire, had previously been to the planet when the passenger ship on which he was travelling on a return trip from the Betelgeuse Conference was captured by space pirates. Craig spends two years as a slave of the beautiful, sensual, and sadistic Lady Morgan Sidney, the only female member of the oligarchy, with whom he became romantically involved. Together, they lived in her castle, ruling over and engaging in sexual relations with those under their dominion, including an enslaved teenager at a clinic used to breed enslaved people. When Craig stumbles on hints of an alien invasion, he realizes he must escape to save humanity.

Craig is depicted as undisturbed by Lady Morgan's sadism. When he is ordered to sexually assault the enslaved teenager, he enjoys his participation in the act.

== Reception ==
In 1973, Kirkus Reviews described the novel as "a coruscatingly literate tale for grown-ups".

In 2008, the novel was criticized by Pornokitsch for devoting too much attention to character development rather than world-building. The review notes that the narrative is split in two, between the present-day official visitation of Craig to the planet Kossar, and his past experiences as Lady Morgan's slave.

The novel's events are set during a war between intergalactic human empire and "sinister" bug people. The world of Kossar is human, but independent of the empire due to its ruling aristocracy's refusal to abolish the slave trade, which represents the very foundation of Kossar's class system and economy. The review notes that the novel does not fully explore these premises. The war is used to explain why a "backwater world" like Kossar became important to the empire, but the conflict is merely referenced and not actually depicted. The novel also hints at the complex politics of both Earth and Kossar and their roots in Machiavellianism, but these politics remain largely unexplored.

The main theme of the novel is the "torrid romance" between a slave and his owner (John Craig and Lady Morgan), through which the author explores the issues of slavery and domination. The reviewer notes however that neither character experiences growth or change through the novel's events. He found both main characters to be "fairly obnoxious". While the author repeatedly reminds the readers that slavery is wrong, he also tries to depict both Craig and Morgan as wise, talented, and heroic. The reviewer finds it hard to view them as heroes, as their actions are not heroic in nature. Throughout the novel, both main characters "freely kill, torture, seduce and make sweeping political decisions on behalf of thousands of people".

Another flaw of the novel, according to the reviewer, is its depiction of Craig as a poet. The prose of the novel is interrupted by the character's poetic compositions, including a number of sonnets, which the reviewer sees as a failed attempt to add depth to the character, finding the interruptions to be irritating.

The novel was described by Becky Ferreira, in an article for Vice, as "both comically amoral and insufferably pretentious. To be fair, these traits were common in 1970s sci-fi." Ferreira also described the novel as "highly unsettling", due to its depiction of rape of enslaved people, particularly teenage girls, and other coercive sex acts. The sex acts described are performed "for the dual purposes of entertainment and controlled procreation". She notes that the adult characters are subjected to infantilization. The novel's dialogue includes "casually unsettling observations", such as when a character remarks that pederasty lacks "aesthetic appeal". Ferreira was disgusted by the novel's fixation on the sexualization of minors and fetishization of rape.

Space Relations saw increased public attention after Jeffrey Epstein died in jail in 2019. In February 1974, Donald Barr had announced that he was resigning as headmaster of the Dalton School, protesting the meddling by the board of trustees, but that he would stay on until the end of the school year in June. That September, despite a lack of credentials, Epstein was hired at Dalton as a math teacher. It is unclear whether Barr hired Epstein during that time. The similarities between the violent sexual depictions in Space Relations, Epstein's sex trafficking activities and obsessions, and the crimes of his associate Ghislaine Maxwell, have all led to increased public scrutiny about Epstein and Barr’s relationship. Sellers of Space Relations on eBay explicitly advertise its connection to Epstein in their descriptions of it. It was also included as a key plot point in the season 4 finale of the legal drama The Good Fight.
