= Stephen Barr =

American physicist

- Born: Stephen Matthew Barr; November 28, 1953 (age 72)
- Education: Columbia University (BA); Princeton University (PhD)
- Spouse: Kathleen Whitney
- Children: 5
- Parent(s): Donald Barr; Mary Margaret Ahern
- Relatives: William Barr (brother)
- Scientific career
- Fields: Theoretical particle physics and cosmology
- Workplaces: University of Delaware
- Thesis: Natural approximate lepton symmetries (1978)
- Doctoral advisor: Anthony Zee
- Website: stephenmbarr.weebly.com

Stephen Matthew Barr (born November 28, 1953) is an American physicist who is a professor emeritus of physics at the University of Delaware. A member of its Bartol Research Institute, Barr does research in theoretical particle physics and cosmology. In 2011, he was elected Fellow of the American Physical Society, the citation reading "for original contributions to grand unified theories, CP violation, and baryogenesis."

== Career ==
His notable work includes co-discovering the much studied flipped SU(5) scheme of unification, identifying the Barr–Zee diagram as an important source of electric dipole moment for basic particles such as the electron and neutron in many theories, and proposing the so-called Nelson–Barr mechanism as a solution to the strong CP problem. He is the author of the article on "Grand Unified Theories" for the Encyclopedia of Physics.

Barr received his PhD in theoretical particle physics from Princeton University in 1978. Princeton awarded him the Charlotte Elizabeth Proctor Fellowship "for distinguished research." He went on to do research at the University of Pennsylvania as a post-doctoral fellow (1978–1980), the University of Washington as a research assistant professor (1980–1985), and Brookhaven National Laboratory as an associate scientist (1985–1987), before joining the faculty of the University of Delaware in 1987. He was elected director of the Bartol Research Institute of the University of Delaware in 2011.

Barr, a practicing Catholic, writes and lectures frequently on the relation of science and religion. From 2000 to 2017 he served on the Editorial Advisory Board or Advisory Council of the ecumenical religious intellectual journal First Things, in which many of his articles and book reviews have appeared since 1995. His writing has also appeared in Commonweal, National Review, Modern Age, The Public Interest, America, The Wall Street Journal, and other publications. In 2002 he gave the Erasmus Lecture, sponsored by the Institute on Religion and Public Life. In 2007 he was awarded the Benemerenti Medal by Pope Benedict XVI. In 2010 he was elected a member of the Academy of Catholic Theology. He is also president of the Society of Catholic Scientists.

== Public lectures ==
In 2002, Barr delivered the sixteenth Erasmus Lecture, titled Retelling the Story of Science, sponsored by First Things magazine and the Institute on Religion and Public Life. In his lecture, Barr explored the relationship between modern science and religious faith, arguing that the supposed conflict between the two is based on misunderstandings of both scientific inquiry and theological tradition. Drawing on his background as a physicist, he proposed a more integrated account of scientific and religious knowledge that respects the integrity of both.

== Personal life ==
He is married to Kathleen Whitney Barr. They have five children.

Barr is the younger brother of William Barr, the 77th and 85th Attorney General of the United States, and the son of Donald Barr, an educator who served as headmaster of Dalton School and Hackley School. He graduated from Columbia College in 1974.

== Publications ==
- Stephen M. Barr, (2006) Modern Physics and Ancient Faith. University of Notre Dame Press. ISBN 0268021988.
- Stephen M. Barr, (2006) A Student's Guide to Natural Science. ISI Press. ISBN 1932236929
- Stephen M. Barr, (2011) Science and Religion: The Myth of Conflict (Explanations). Catholic Truth Society. ISBN 1860827276
- Stephen M. Barr, (2016) The Believing Scientist: Essays on Science and Religion. Description & arrow/scrollable preview. Eerdmans. ISBN 0802873707

=== Articles ===
Stephen M. Barr, (2023) Contrary to Popular Belief: The Catholic Church Has No Quarrel With Evolution and Never Condemned It.

== See also ==
- List of science and religion scholars
