= William Barr =

American attorney (born 1950)

Bill Barr
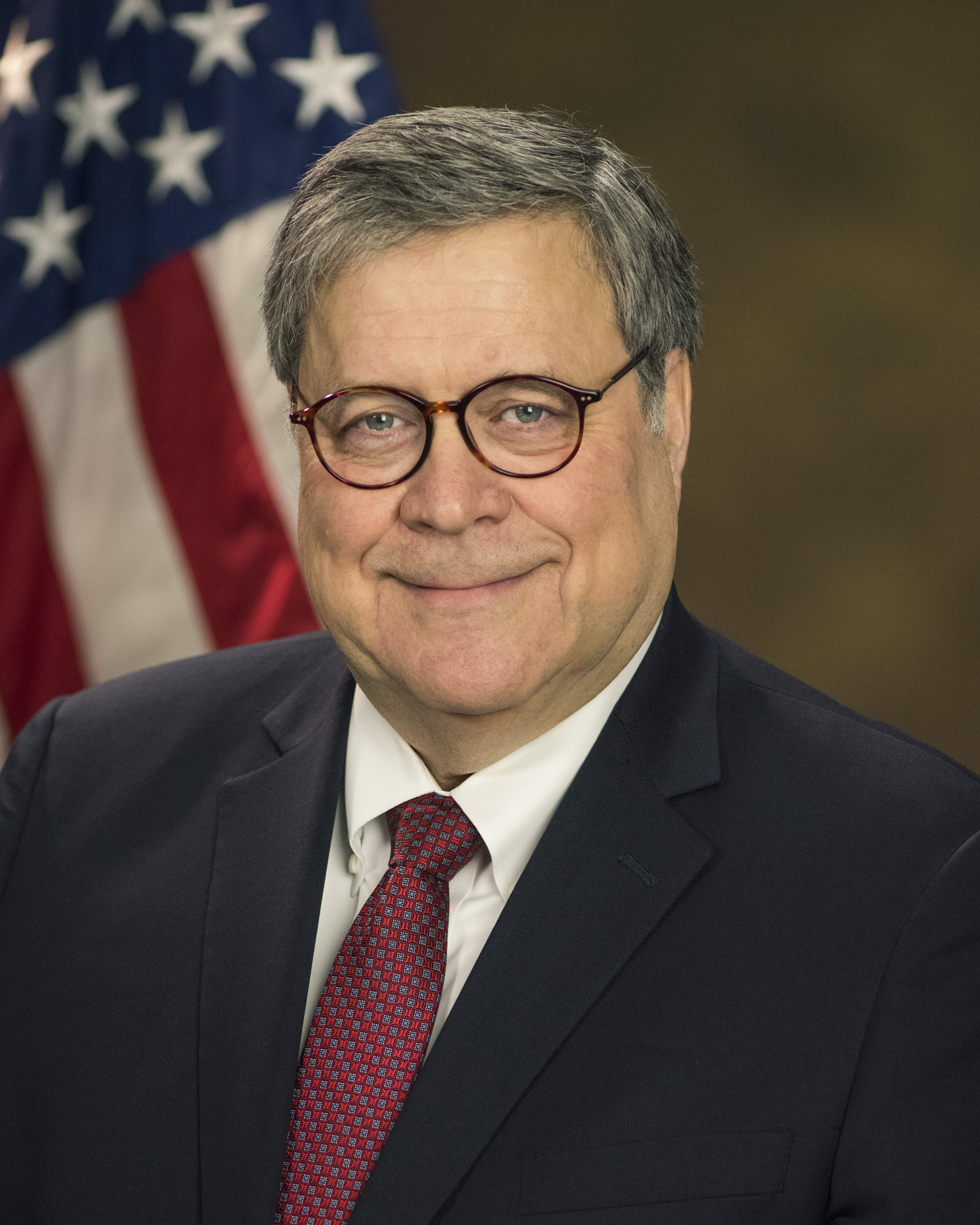
- Official portrait, 2019

77th & 85th United States Attorney General
- In office February 14, 2019 – December 23, 2020
- President: Donald Trump
- Deputy: Rod Rosenstein; Ed O'Callaghan (acting); Jeffrey A. Rosen
- Preceded by: Jeff Sessions
- Succeeded by: Merrick Garland
- In office August 16, 1991 – January 20, 1993 (Note: Acting: August 16, 1991 – November 26, 1991)
- President: George H. W. Bush
- Deputy: George J. Terwilliger III
- Preceded by: Dick Thornburgh
- Succeeded by: Janet Reno

25th United States Deputy Attorney General
- In office May 26, 1990 – November 26, 1991
- President: George H. W. Bush
- Preceded by: Donald B. Ayer
- Succeeded by: George J. Terwilliger III

United States Assistant Attorney General for the Office of Legal Counsel
- In office January 20, 1989 – May 26, 1990
- President: George H. W. Bush
- Preceded by: Douglas Kmiec
- Succeeded by: J. Michael Luttig

Personal details
- Born: William Pelham Barr; May 23, 1950 (age 76) New York City, New York, U.S.
- Party: Republican
- Spouse: Christine Moynihan (m. 1973)
- Children: 3
- Relatives: Donald Barr (father); Stephen Barr (brother)
- Education: Columbia University (BA, MA); George Washington University (JD)
- Barr's voice Barr at a press conference on the George Floyd protests Recorded June 5, 2020

William Pelham Barr (born May 23, 1950) is an American attorney who served as United States Attorney General in the administration of President George H. W. Bush from 1991 to 1993 and again in the first administration of President Donald Trump from 2019 to 2020.

Born and raised in New York City, Barr was educated at the Horace Mann School, Columbia University, and George Washington University Law School. From 1971 to 1977, Barr was employed by the Central Intelligence Agency. He then served as a law clerk to judge Malcolm Richard Wilkey of the United States Court of Appeals for the District of Columbia Circuit. In the 1980s, Barr worked for the law firm Shaw, Pittman, Potts & Trowbridge, with one year's work in the White House of the Ronald Reagan administration dealing with legal policies. Before becoming attorney general in 1991, Barr held numerous other posts within the Department of Justice, including leading the Office of Legal Counsel (OLC) and serving as deputy attorney general. From 1994 to 2008, Barr did corporate legal work for GTE and its successor company Verizon Communications. From 2009 to 2018, Barr served on the board of directors for Time Warner.

Barr is a longtime proponent of the unitary executive theory of nearly unfettered presidential authority over the executive branch of the U.S. government. In 1989, Barr, as the head of the OLC, justified the U.S. invasion of Panama to arrest Manuel Noriega. As deputy attorney general, Barr authorized an FBI operation in 1991 which freed hostages at the Talladega federal prison. An influential advocate for tougher criminal justice policies, Barr as attorney general in 1992 authored the report The Case for More Incarceration, where he argued for an increase in the United States incarceration rate. Under Barr's advice, President George H. W. Bush in 1992 pardoned six officials involved in the Iran–Contra affair.

Barr became attorney general for the second time in 2019. During his term, he received criticism from many for his handling of several challenges, including his letter on the Mueller report, interventions in the convictions and sentences of former advisors to President Trump, Roger Stone and Michael Flynn, his order of the federal government to resume federal executions after 17 years, and allegations of political interference in the removal of Geoffrey Berman from his Southern District of New York attorney position in a matter pertaining to the indictment of Turkish bank Halkbank, a bank with close personal ties to Recep Tayyip Erdoğan. On December 1, 2020, contradicting Trump's false claims of widespread interference following his electoral defeat, Barr stated that FBI and Justice Department investigations found no evidence of irregularities that would have changed the outcome of the presidential election. Barr is the second person to ever serve two non-consecutive terms as U.S. attorney general, after John J. Crittenden.

== Early life and education ==
Barr was born in New York City in 1950. His father, Donald Barr, was an educator and writer who taught English literature at Columbia University before becoming headmaster of the Dalton School in Manhattan and later the Hackley School in Tarrytown, New York, both members of the Ivy Preparatory School League. Barr's mother, Mary Margaret (née Ahern), also taught at Columbia. Barr's father was raised Jewish but later converted to the Roman Catholic Church. His mother is of Irish Catholic ancestry. Barr was raised as a Catholic. Barr was the second of four sons, and his younger brother Stephen Barr is a professor of physics at the University of Delaware.

Barr grew up on New York City's Upper West Side. As a child, he attended a Catholic grammar school, Corpus Christi School, and then the non-sectarian Horace Mann School. After high school, he attended Columbia University, where he majored in government and graduated with a Bachelor of Arts in 1971. Barr was also an active member in the Sigma Nu fraternity. He did two additional years of graduate study at Columbia, receiving a Master of Arts in government and Chinese studies in 1973. While at Columbia, Barr opposed anti–Vietnam War occupation protests by students on campus.

After moving to Washington, D.C., to work as an intelligence analyst for the Central Intelligence Agency (CIA), Barr entered the evening student program at George Washington University Law School. He graduated in 1977 with a Juris Doctor with highest honors.

== Early career ==
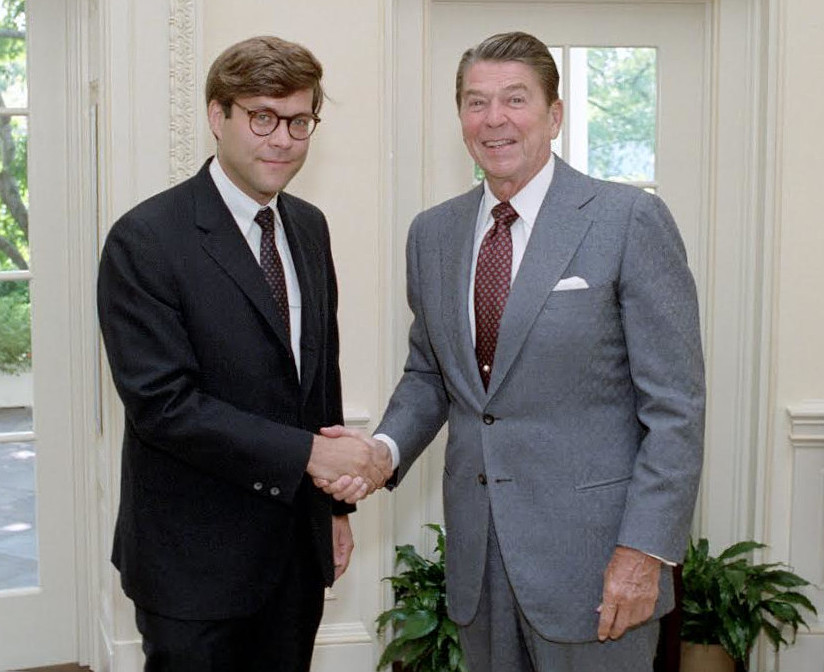
Barr with President Ronald Reagan in the Oval Office in 1983

Barr worked for the CIA from 1971 to 1977 while attending graduate school and law school. He was first hired as a summer intern for two years. During his law school years he was an analyst in the Intelligence Directorate division from 1973 to 1975, and then transitioning to an assistant in the Office of Legislative Counsel and an agency liaison to Congress from 1975 to 1977.

After graduating from law school in 1977, Barr spent one year as a law clerk to Judge Malcolm Wilkey of the U.S. Court of Appeals for the D.C. Circuit. He then joined the law firm of Shaw, Pittman, Potts & Trowbridge (now Pillsbury Winthrop Shaw Pittman) from 1978 to 1982 and again from 1983 to 1989, after serving as Deputy Assistant Director for Legal Policy on the domestic policy staff at the Reagan White House from May 1982 to September 1983.

Barr has never prosecuted a case.

=== U.S. Department of Justice ===
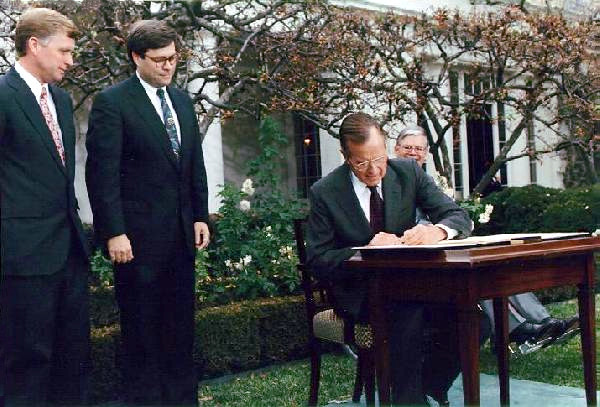
Barr and Dan Quayle watch as President George H. W. Bush signs the Civil Rights Commission Reauthorization Act in the Rose Garden of the White House in 1991.

In 1989, at the beginning of his administration, President George H. W. Bush appointed Barr to the U.S. Department of Justice as assistant attorney general for the Office of Legal Counsel (OLC), an office which functions as the legal advisor for the president and executive agencies. Barr was known as a strong defender of presidential power. He wrote an advisory opinion justifying the U.S. invasion of Panama and arrest of Manuel Noriega. He wrote legal justifications for the practice of rendition, so that the FBI could enter onto foreign soil without the consent of the host government to apprehend fugitives wanted by the United States government for terrorism or drug-trafficking. Barr declined a congressional request for the full 1989 opinion, but instead provided a document that "summarizes the principal conclusions". Congress subpoenaed the opinion, and its public release after Barr's departure from the Justice Department showed he had omitted significant findings in the opinion from his summary document.

=== U.S. deputy attorney general (1990–1991) ===
In May 1990, Barr was appointed deputy attorney general, the official responsible for day-to-day management of the department. According to media reports, he was generally praised for his professional management of the department.

During August 1991, when then-Attorney General Richard Thornburgh resigned to campaign for the Senate, Barr was named acting attorney general. Three days after Barr accepted that position, 121 Cuban inmates, awaiting deportation to Cuba, seized nine hostages at the Talladega federal prison. He directed the FBI's Hostage Rescue Team to assault the prison, which resulted in rescuing all hostages without loss of life.

== First tenure as U.S. attorney general (1991–1993) ==
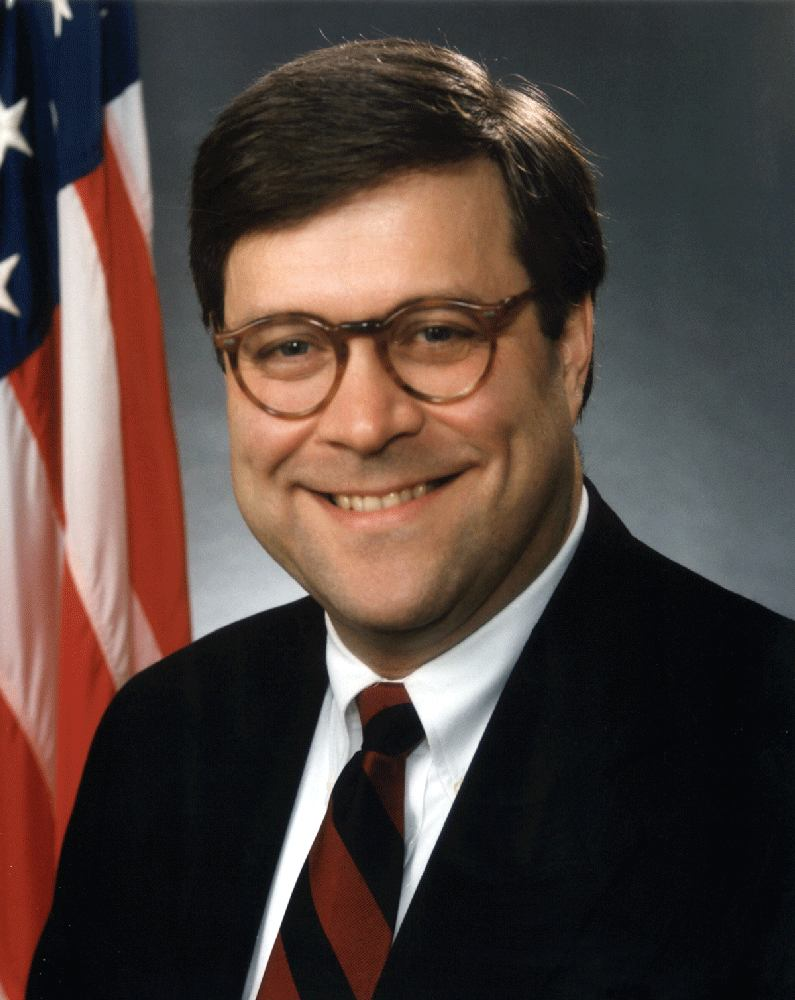
Official photo of Barr during his first tenure as attorney general

During his first tenure as AG, media characterized Barr as "a staunch conservative who rarely hesitates to put his hardline views into action". He was described as affable with a dry, self-deprecating wit. The New York Times described the "central theme" of his tenure to be "his contention that violent crime can be reduced only by expanding Federal and state prisons to jail habitual violent offenders". In an effort to prioritize violent crime, Barr reassigned 300 FBI agents from counterintelligence work to investigations of gang violence. The New York Times called this move "the largest single manpower shift in the bureau's history".

During the 1992 election year, The Wall Street Journal wrote of Barr's work that he "has put a heavy emphasis on attention-grabbing events and pronouncements that may have more to do with presidential election-year politicking than with fighting crime on the streets."

=== Nomination and confirmation in 1991 ===
It was reported that President Bush was impressed with Barr's management of the hostage crisis; weeks later, Bush nominated him as attorney general.

At the time of his 1991 nomination, Barr enjoyed a "sterling reputation" among Republican and Democratic politicians alike. His two-day confirmation hearing was "unusually placid", and he was received well by both Republicans and Democrats on the Senate Judiciary Committee. Asked whether he thought a constitutional right to privacy included the right to an abortion, Barr responded that he believed the Constitution was not originally intended to create a right to abortion; that Roe v. Wade was thus wrongly decided; and that abortion should be a "legitimate issue for state legislators". Barr also said at the hearings that Roe v. Wade was "the law of the land" and claimed he did not have "fixed or settled views" on abortion. Senate Judiciary Committee chair Joe Biden, though disagreeing with Barr, responded that it was the "first candid answer" he had heard from a nominee on a question that witnesses would normally evade; Biden hailed Barr as "a throwback to the days when we actually had attorneys general that would talk to you". Barr was approved unanimously by the Senate Judiciary Committee, was confirmed by voice vote by the full Senate, and was sworn in as attorney general on November 26, 1991.

=== The Case for More Incarceration ===
The Case for More Incarceration

In 1992, Barr authored a report, The Case for More Incarceration, which argued for an increase in the United States incarceration rate, the creation of a national program to construct more prisons, and the abolition of parole release. Barr argued that incarceration reduced crime, pointing to crime and incarceration rates in 1960, 1970, 1980 and 1990. A 1999 criminology study criticized Barr's analysis, saying "so complex an issue as the relationship between crime and punishment cannot be addressed through so simplistic an analysis as a negative correlation between the two very aggregated time series of crime rates and incarceration rates." University of Minnesota criminologist Michael Tonry said the data in Barr's report was deceptively presented; if Barr had chosen five-year intervals, then the data would not have supported Barr's argument, and if Barr had chosen to look at violent crime specifically (as opposed to all crimes as a category), then the data would not have supported his argument.

Barr said in the report, "The benefits of increased incarceration would be enjoyed disproportionately by black Americans." In the report, Barr approvingly quoted New Mexico attorney general Hal Stratton, "I don't know anyone [who] goes to prison on their first crime. By the time you go to prison, you are a pretty bad guy." Barr's report influenced the Violent Crime Control and Law Enforcement Act of 1994, which aimed to increase the incarceration rate.

=== Investigations ===
In October 1991, Barr appointed then-retired Democratic Chicago judge Nicholas Bua as special counsel in the Inslaw scandal. Bua's 1993 report found the Department of Justice guilty of no wrongdoing in the matter.

In October 1992, Barr appointed then retired New Jersey federal judge Frederick B. Lacey to investigate the Department of Justice and the Central Intelligence Agency handling of the Banca Nazionale del Lavoro (BNL) Iraqgate scandal. The appointment came after Democrats called for a special prosecutor during the scandal fearing a "cover-up" by the administration. House Banking Committee Chairman Henry B. González called for Barr's resignation, citing "repeated, clear failures and obstruction" by the Department of Justice in allegedly delaying an investigation of the BNL-Iraqgate case. González also called for an independent special counsel investigation.

=== Bank of Credit and Commerce International ===
In July 1991, regulators in seven countries shut down the Luxembourg-based Bank of Credit and Commerce International (BCCI), after investigators uncovered that the decentralized and poorly regulated bank, which was allegedly run by Saudi and possibly Pakistani Intelligence, was involved in fraud and money laundering operations for criminal organizations, corrupt governments, and intelligence agencies. BCCI managed to circumvent Federal Reserve controls to buy the bank holding company First American Bankshares, allowing direct access to American financial institutions. Several sources have alleged that the CIA had been aware of BCCI's activities and its purchase of First American, but since the CIA, DIA, and the NSC utilized BCCI accounts for covert operations and since the Saudis' provided intelligence to the CIA from BCCI's illicit activities (see Safari Club), the CIA worked with Barr to prevent any investigation of BCCI, which was directed by Assistant Attorney General Robert Mueller since 1986 (other sources claim 1983).

After the bank was shut down in 1991, Barr testified in congress that the investigation had "coordination" problems and promised to remedy the issue but other federal prosecutors claim Barr actively thwarted several indictments of BCCI in Florida, when the Customs Service discovered that CenTrust Bank of Miami was a front for BCCI and possibly Saudi Intelligence. The American investigation of BCCI was taken over by Senator John Kerry after discovering the bank during drug trafficking investigations. After becoming impatient with the slow pace and inaction of the Justice Department under Barr, Kerry had the investigation turned over to New York state district attorney Robert Morgenthau, who managed to extract a plea agreement with BCCI for various criminal violations and the indictment of First American chairman Clark Clifford.

=== Phone surveillance program ===
In 1992, Barr launched a surveillance program to gather records of innocent Americans' international phone calls. The purpose of the DEA program was to collect "bulk logs of outgoing international phone calls from the United States to countries deemed to be linked to narcotics trafficking" through "issuing administrative subpoenas to phone companies" According to USA Today, the program "provided a blueprint for far broader phone-data surveillance the government launched after the terrorist attacks of Sept. 11, 2001". The DoJ inspector general concluded that this program had been launched without a review of its legality and made 16 recommendations including areas relating to subpoena procedures and guidance training materials.

In December 2019, Democratic senators Ron Wyden and Patrick J. Leahy asked the Justice Department's Office of Professional Responsibility to investigate Barr for approving the program, accusing Barr of "an illegal, bulk surveillance program" alleging "without conducting any legal analysis".

=== Iran-Contra ===
In late 1992, Independent Counsel Lawrence Walsh, who had been chosen to investigate the Iran–Contra affair, found documents in the possession of Reagan's former defense secretary, Caspar Weinberger, which Walsh said was "evidence of a conspiracy among the highest-ranking Reagan Administration officials to lie to Congress and the American public". Weinberger was set to stand trial on felony charges on January 5, 1993. His "indictment said Mr. Weinberger's notes contradicted Mr. Bush's assertions that he had only a fragmentary knowledge of the arms secretly sold to Iran in 1985 and 1986 in exchange for American hostages in Lebanon." According to Walsh, then-president Bush might have been called as a witness.

On December 24, 1992, during his final month in office, Bush, on the advice of Barr, pardoned Weinberger, along with five other administration officials who had been found guilty on charges relating to the Iran–Contra affair. Barr was consulted extensively regarding the pardons, and especially advocated for pardoning Weinberger.

Walsh complained about the move, insinuating that Bush on Barr's advice had used the pardons to avoid testifying and stating that: "The Iran-contra cover-up, which has continued for more than six years, has now been completed." In 2003, he wrote an account of the investigation in his book, Firewall: The Iran-Contra Conspiracy and Cover-Up.

Because of this and Barr's unwillingness to appoint an independent counsel to look into a second scandal known as Iraqgate, New York Times writer William Safire began to refer to Barr as "Coverup-General Barr", accusing Barr of concealing George H. W. Bush's involvement in Iraqgate and the Iran–Contra affair. Barr, however, responded that he believed Bush had made the right decision regarding that and he felt people in the case had been treated unfairly. Barr said Walsh was a "head-hunter" who "had completely lost perspective".

== Post-Bush administration career ==
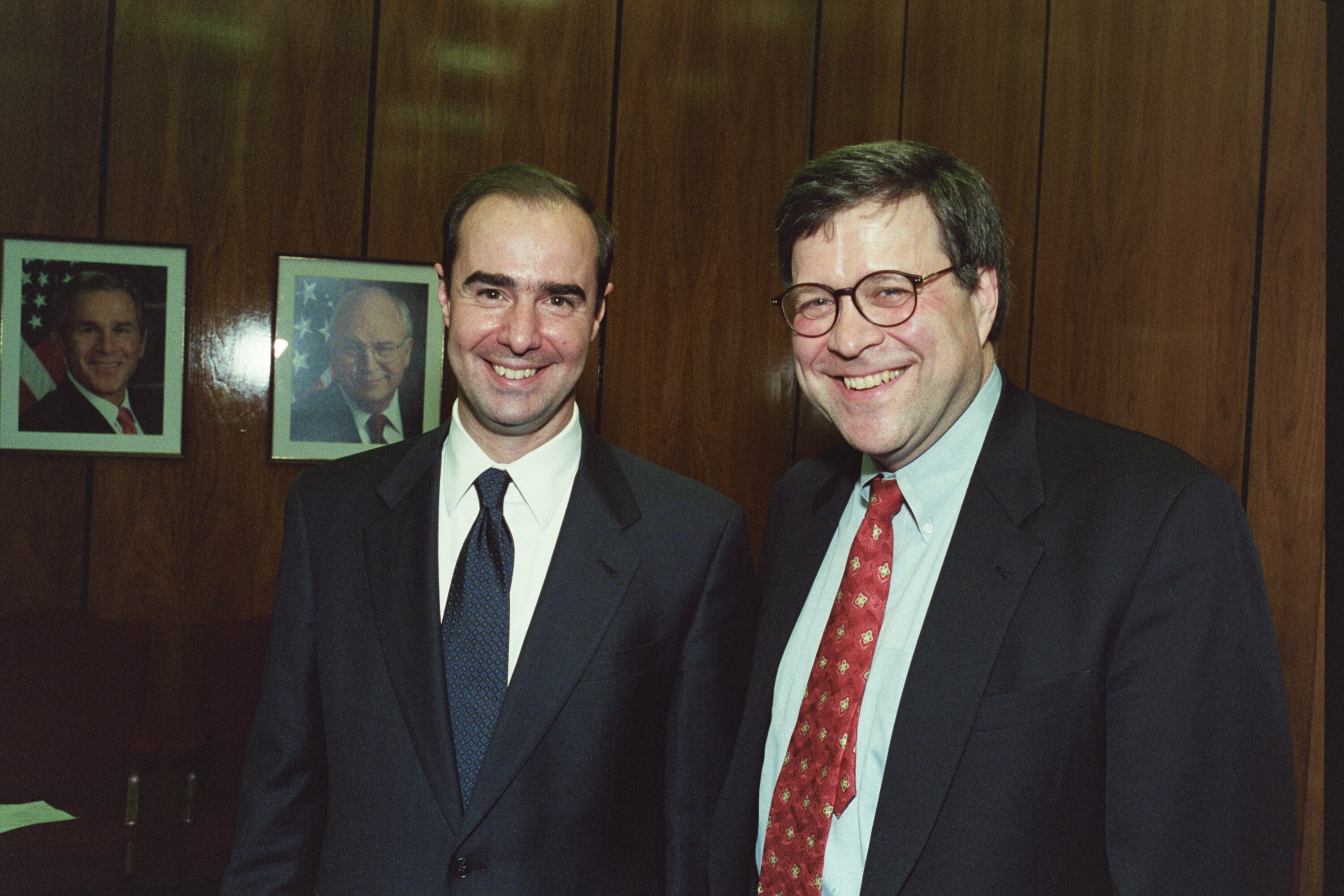
Barr with Eugene Scalia in February 2002

Upon leaving the DOJ in 1993, Barr was appointed by Virginia Governor George Allen to co-chair a commission to implement tougher criminal justice policies and abolish parole in the state. Barr has been described as a "leader of the parole-abolition campaign" in Virginia.

After leaving the DOJ, he criticized the Clinton administration for being "soft on crime". Barr expressed his opposition to efforts to end mandatory minimum sentencing. In a 1993 op-ed, he wrote, "The notion that there are sympathetic people out there who become hapless victims of the criminal-justice system and are locked away in federal prison beyond the time they deserve is simply a myth." In a 1995 essay, Barr rejected that crime was caused by material factors, such as poverty, arguing instead that crime was caused by immorality: "Spending more money on these material social programs is not going to have an impact on crime, and, if anything, it will exacerbate the problem."

In 1994, Barr became Executive Vice President and General Counsel of the telecommunications company GTE Corporation, where he served for 14 years. During his corporate tenure, Barr directed a successful litigation campaign by the local telephone industry to achieve deregulation by scuttling a series of FCC rules, personally arguing several cases in the federal courts of appeals and the Supreme Court. In 2000, when GTE merged with Bell Atlantic to become Verizon Communications, Barr became the general counsel and executive vice president of Verizon until he retired in 2008. Barr became a multimillionaire from working in GTE and Verizon. In 2001, Barr's salary was reportedly $1.5 million.

From 1997 to 2000, Barr served on the Board of Visitors of the College of William & Mary in Williamsburg.

In 2009, Barr was briefly of counsel to the firm Kirkland & Ellis. From 2010 until 2017, he advised corporations on government enforcement matters and regulatory litigation; he rejoined Kirkland and Ellis in 2017.

From 2009 to 2018, Barr served on the board of directors for Time Warner.

=== Comments about the Starr investigation of President Clinton ===
In March 1998, Barr lambasted the Clinton administration for criticizing Independent Counsel Ken Starr's investigation of the Whitewater controversy, which had shifted towards an investigation of an alleged affair between Clinton and Monica Lewinsky. Barr said the criticism appeared "to have the improper purpose of influencing and impeding an ongoing criminal investigation and intimidating possible jurors, witnesses and even investigators".

=== Comments about the Trump administration ===
On April 18, 2019, a redacted version of Report on the Investigation into Russian Interference in the 2016 Presidential Election was released to the public.

During the first two years of the Trump presidency, Barr frequently criticized legal challenges against Trump and investigations into the Trump 2016 campaign and presidency.

In 2017, Barr said there was "nothing inherently wrong" with Donald Trump's calls for investigating Hillary Clinton while the two were both running for president. Barr added that an investigation into an alleged Uranium One controversy was more warranted than looking into whether Trump conspired with Russia to influence the 2016 elections. Barr also said in 2017 that he did not think "all this stuff" about incarcerating or prosecuting Hillary Clinton was appropriate to say, but added that "there are things that should be investigated that haven't been investigated," although the FBI began investigating the Clinton Foundation and the related Uranium One matter in 2015, followed by investigations by Republican congressional committees.

In February 2017, Barr argued that Trump was justified in firing Acting Attorney General Sally Yates over her refusal to defend Executive Order 13769.

Barr was publicly critical of the special counsel investigation. In 2017, he faulted Mueller for hiring prosecutors who have contributed to Democratic politicians, saying that his team should have had more "balance", and characterized the obstruction of justice investigation as "asinine" and that it was "taking on the look of an entirely political operation to overthrow the president".

In June 2018, Barr sent an unsolicited 20-page memo to senior Justice Department officials. He also provided copies to members of Trump's legal team and discussed it with some of them. In his memo, Barr argued that the Special Counsel should not be investigating Trump for obstruction of justice because Trump's actions, such as firing FBI Director James Comey, were within his powers as head of the executive branch. He characterized the obstruction investigation as "fatally misconceived" and "grossly irresponsible" and "potentially disastrous" to the executive branch. The day after the existence of the memo became known, Deputy Attorney General Rod Rosenstein said "our decisions are informed by our knowledge of the actual facts of the case, which Mr. Barr didn't have." Democrats later characterized the memo as Barr's "job application" for the attorney general position.

=== Political donations ===
The National Republican Senatorial Committee (NRSC) financially assists Republicans in their Senate election contests; in the seven years from 2009 to 2016, Barr gave six donations to the NRSC totaling $85,400. In a five-month period from October 2018 to February 2019, Barr donated five times (around $10,000 every month) for a total of $51,000. When Barr started donating more frequently to the NRSC, it was uncertain whether then-Attorney General Jeff Sessions would remain in his job. Barr continued donating even after Sessions resigned, and after Trump nominated Barr for attorney general. The donations stopped after Barr was confirmed by the Senate as attorney general. NRSC refunded Barr $30,000 before his confirmation. Previously in 2017, Barr had said he felt "prosecutors who make political contributions are identifying fairly strongly with a political party."

== Second tenure as U.S. attorney general (2019–2020) ==
=== Second nomination and confirmation ===
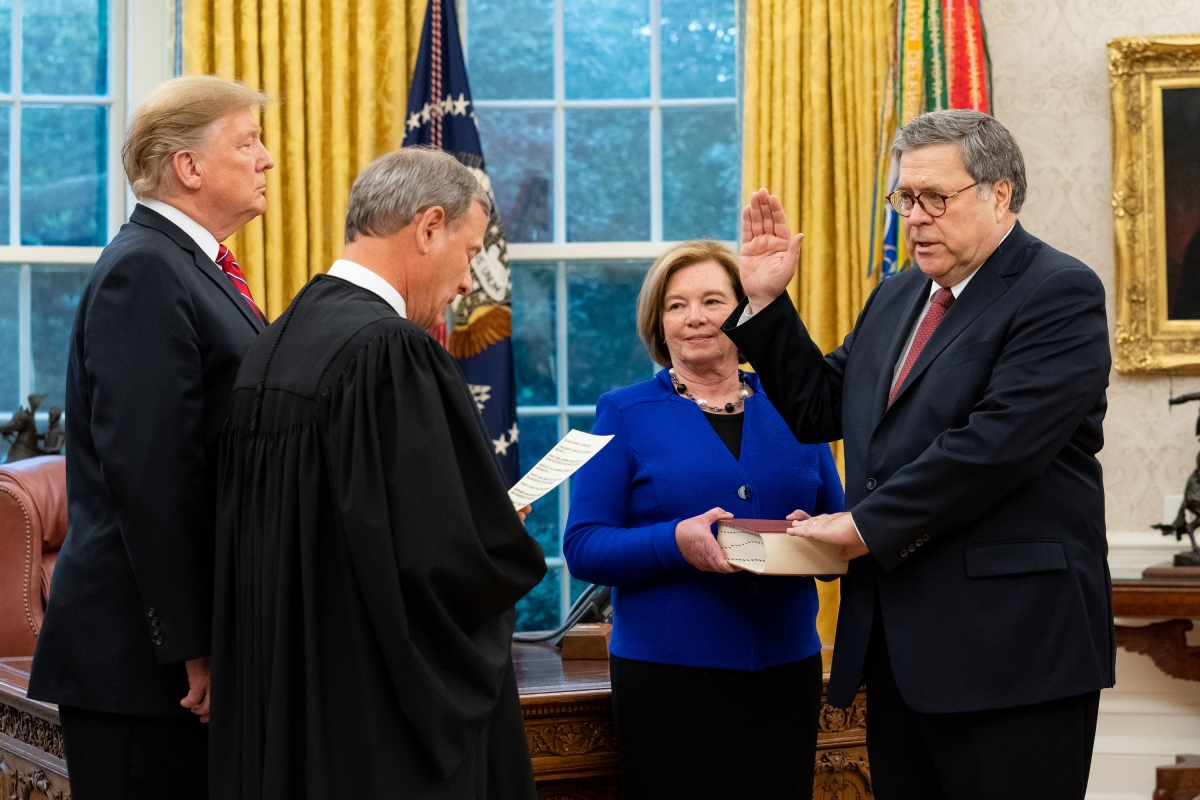
Barr is sworn in as attorney general by Chief Justice John Roberts in 2019.

On December 7, 2018, President Donald Trump announced Barr's nomination to succeed Jeff Sessions. Michael Isikoff and Daniel Klaidman reported that Trump had sought Barr as chief defense lawyer for Trump regarding the special counsel investigation headed by Robert Mueller after Barr made three positions known. First, Barr supported Trump's firing of Comey on May 9, 2017. Second, he questioned the appointments of some of Mueller's prosecutors due to political donations they had made to the Clinton campaign. Third, he alleged there were conflicts of interest of two appointees to the Special Counsel Team, Jennie Rhee and Bruce Ohr.

Barr was confirmed as attorney general on February 14, 2019, by a 54–45 near party-line vote, with Sen. Doug Jones (D-AL), Joe Manchin (D-WV), and Kyrsten Sinema (D-AZ) as the three Democrats to vote Yea. Republican senator Rand Paul (R-KY) voted No and Richard Burr (R-NC) did not vote. Later that day, Barr was sworn in as the nation's 85th attorney general by Chief Justice John Roberts in a ceremony at the White House. He is the first person to be appointed to a second non-consecutive term as attorney general since John J. Crittenden in 1850.

On December 11, 2019, former attorney general Eric Holder, who had served under President Obama, wrote an op-ed in The Washington Post claiming William Barr is "unfit to be attorney general" for his "naked partisan[ship]", "attempts to vilify the president's critics", his attacks on the inspector general and his comments on ongoing investigations.

=== Tenure ===
In May 2019, three months into his tenure as attorney general, the Associated Press characterized Barr as a champion and advocate for Trump. Barr had enthusiastically supported Trump's political agenda, repeated Trump's assertion that those investigating Trump had engaged in spying, defied congressional subpoenas, and refused to give Congress an unredacted version of the Mueller report.

Under Barr's leadership, the Justice Department changed its position on the Affordable Care Act (ACA). Previously the department took the position that the individual mandate provision was unconstitutional, but could be severed from the whole healthcare law. On March 25, the department updated its position to argue that the entire law was unconstitutional. On May 2, the department conducted a filing with the United States Court of Appeals for the Fifth Circuit to nullify the entire law, arguing that the removal of the provision on individual mandate results in the entire law becoming unconstitutional.

Also in July 2019, Barr reportedly made the decision to not bring federal civil rights charges against New York policeman Daniel Pantaleo for causing the death of Eric Garner. In so doing, he overruled the Justice Department's Civil Rights Division, which advocated charging Pantaleo, instead agreeing with Justice Department prosecutors from New York.

On July 25, 2019, Barr ordered the resumption of federal executions.

On July 8, 2019, Barr announced his recusal from the Justice Department's review of the 2008 federal prosecution of American financier and convicted sex offender Jeffrey Epstein. On August 10, 2019, Epstein was found unresponsive in his jail cell at the Metropolitan Correctional Center (MCC). Barr later announced that Justice Department officials were investigating "serious irregularities" at the Metropolitan Correctional Center.

In mid-August 2019, Barr had a rare face-to-face meeting with Trump and Giuliani associates Joseph diGenova and his wife Victoria Toensing, who since earlier that year represented former Ukrainian prosecutor general Viktor Shokin and pro-Russia Ukrainian oligarch Dmytry Firtash as attorneys. Trump had announced in March 2018 that diGenova and Toensing would join his legal defense team during the Mueller investigation; the appointments were withdrawn days later, though Trump personal attorney Jay Sekulow said they might assist in other legal matters. DiGenova has said he has known Barr for thirty years, as they both worked in the Reagan Justice Department. Since 2014, Firtash had been fighting extradition to the United States under a federal indictment while he was living in Austria after being arrested there and released on $155 million bail, and diGenova and Toensing sought to have Barr drop the charges. Firtash was a middleman for importing Russian natural gas into Ukraine and has said he was installed in that role by Russian organized crime boss Semion Mogilevich; Russian president Vladimir Putin reportedly agreed to the appointment. When he was vice president, Joe Biden had urged Ukraine to eliminate middlemen such as Firtash and to reduce the country's reliance on imports of Russian natural gas. Giuliani had directed associate Lev Parnas to approach Firtash with a recommendation to hire diGenova and Toensing, with the proposition that Firtash could help provide damaging information on Biden, which Parnas's attorney described was "part of any potential resolution to [Firtash's] extradition matter." DiGenova and Toensing obtained a September 2019 statement from Shokin that made false assertions about corruption by Biden. The statement noted that it was prepared "at the request of lawyers acting for Dmitry Firtash ('DF'), for use in legal proceedings in Austria." Giuliani promoted the statement in television appearances as purported evidence of wrongdoing by Biden. Prior to meeting with diGenova and Toensing, Barr had been briefed in detail on the initial Trump–Ukraine scandal whistleblower complaint within the CIA that had been forwarded to the Justice Department, as well as on Giuliani's activities in Ukraine. Barr declined to intervene in the Firtash case. Bloomberg News reported that its sources told them Giuliani's high-profile publicity of the Shokin statement had greatly reduced the chances of the Justice Department dropping the charges against Firtash, as it would appear to be a political quid pro quo.

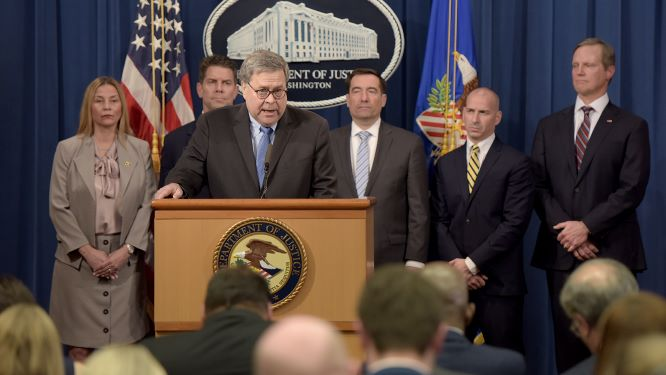
Barr discusses the shooting at Pensacola Naval Air Station, 13 January 2020.

In October 2019, as Trump faced an impeachment inquiry about the Trump-Ukraine scandal, Barr met with Fox Corporation chairman Rupert Murdoch at his Manhattan home. Trump reportedly was angered by a recent Fox News poll showing a majority of Americans supported his impeachment and removal from office, as well as analysis of the scandal by Fox News senior judicial analyst Andrew Napolitano, a previous Trump ally who had argued the president should be impeached. Trump reportedly directed Barr to meet with Murdoch, and it was not immediately known what the men discussed, but CNN media analyst Brian Stelter wrote in his 2020 book about Fox News that silencing Napolitano was among the topics discussed. The meeting was one day after Parnas and Igor Fruman, associates of Trump and Giuliani, were arrested as they prepared to fly to Vienna to arrange an interview between Fox News host Sean Hannity and Shokin, who had made false corruption allegations about Joe Biden, a potential challenger to Trump in the 2020 presidential election.

In December 2019, Barr said that communities that do not show the "respect and support that law enforcement deserves ... might find themselves without the police protection they need." Barr dropped the Department of Justice's case against the police officer who killed Eric Garner in 2014.

In February 2020, Senator Lindsey Graham stated that the Justice Department "is receiving information coming out of the Ukraine from" Rudy Giuliani, a personal lawyer to president Donald Trump. Graham had learned from Barr that "they've created a process that Rudy could give information and they would see if it's verified." A day later, Barr confirmed Graham's account, stating that he had "established an intake process" for information on Ukraine, including from Giuliani, while citing an "obligation to have an open door" policy on receiving information. Giuliani has claimed to have information of improprieties regarding Ukraine for Joe Biden (a former vice president, later a 2020 presidential candidate) and his son Hunter Biden. Giuliani himself is reportedly being investigated by the Justice Department, with two of his associates having been arrested.

Barr has made commentary about social and religious issues in speeches and television appearances. In an October 2019 address at the University of Notre Dame, Barr asserted that "militant secularists" had been attacking Judeo-Christian values for five decades, stating, "This is not decay. This is organized destruction. Secular forces and their allies have marshaled all the forces of mass communication, popular culture, the entertainment industry, and academia, in an unremitting assault on religion and traditional values."

During a June 2020 House Judiciary Committee testimony, Donald Ayer, a former deputy attorney general for whom Barr worked during the George H. W. Bush presidency, asserted that Barr "poses the greatest threat, in my lifetime, to our rule of law and to public trust in it". Three months later, Ayer claimed Barr "is on a mission to install the president as an autocrat".

Barr has sometimes supported controversial or false statements made by Trump.

On September 21, 2020, Barr joined Advisor Ivanka Trump, Georgia governor Brian Kemp, First Lady Marty Kemp, and Tim Tebow in Atlanta to announce $100 million in grant funding for victims of human trafficking.

On December 21, 2020, Barr announced federal charges against Abu Agila Masud for building the bomb that destroyed Pan Am Flight 103. Barr had taken an interest in solving that case, both during and between his tenures as attorney general.

In May 2021, federal judge Beryl Howell unsealed documents showing that in November 2020 the Barr DOJ persuaded a grand jury to subpoena Twitter for information to identify who operated a parody Twitter account, @NunesAlt, that mocked Republican congressman and ardent Trump ally Devin Nunes. Twitter was also issued a gag order in the matter. Challenging the subpoena, the company noted Nunes's history of litigation and argued that the subpoena appeared to be a government attempt to aid his efforts to retaliate against his critics, and violated the First Amendment. The DOJ cited 18USC§875(c) that prohibits threats, but did not provide any examples of threats to Twitter attorneys. CNN reported that investigators sought information about several online accounts relating to threats against senator Mitch McConnell. The DOJ withdrew the subpoena one week after Twitter challenged it to Howell, who oversees federal grand juries, in March 2021. Prior to Barr's second tenure, the Trump Justice Department in 2017 and 2018 subpoenaed metadata from the iCloud accounts of at least a dozen individuals associated with the House Intelligence Committee, including that of ranking Democratic member Adam Schiff and Eric Swalwell, and family members, to investigate leaks to the press about contacts between Trump associates and Russia.

==== Mueller investigation and report ====
On January 14, 2019, a day before Barr's confirmation hearing for attorney general, Barr sent written testimony to the Senate Judiciary Committee regarding the eventual final Mueller report, saying "it is very important that the public and Congress be informed of the results of the special counsel's work ... For that reason, my goal will be to provide as much transparency as I can consistent with the law."

Upon taking office, Barr refused calls to recuse himself from overseeing the Mueller investigation, despite his June 2018 memo arguing that the special counsel had no right to investigate Trump.

On March 22, 2019, Mueller concluded his special counsel investigation and gave the final report to Barr.

The four-page letter Barr sent to leaders of the House and Senate judiciary committees on March 24, 2019. It claims to describe the principal conclusions of the Special Counsel investigation.

Even before seeing the Mueller report, Barr had already decided to clear Trump of obstruction. To this end, he tasked the Office of Legal Counsel with writing a memo that would provide a pretextual justification for this decision. According to federal judge Amy Berman Jackson, the Barr letter which declined to charge Trump, and a Justice Department memo purportedly containing advice to Barr that Trump should not be charged, were "being written by the very same people at the very same time". Jackson also stated that email evidence showed that the Barr letter was "the priority, and it is getting completed first" ahead of the advice memo. The final memo was signed by Steven Engel and Ed O'Callaghan.

On March 24, Barr submitted a four-page letter to Congress describing what he said were the report's principal conclusions: first, that the Special Counsel did not establish conspiracy or coordination between the Trump campaign and Russia's efforts to interfere with the 2016 election; and second, that the Special Counsel made no decision as to whether to prosecute Trump for obstruction of justice, quoting "while this report does not conclude that the President committed a crime, it also does not exonerate him." Barr stated that the Special Counsel's decision "leaves it to" Barr to decide if Trump obstructed justice. Barr and Deputy Attorney General Rosenstein themselves concluded that the evidence "is not sufficient to establish" obstruction of justice by Trump, and made the decision not to press the charge.

On March 25, Mueller reportedly wrote a letter to Barr, as described in The New York Times as "expressing his and his team's concerns that the attorney general had inadequately portrayed their conclusions". In USA Today it was described that Mueller "expressed his differences with Barr".

On March 27, Mueller sent Barr another letter describing his concerns of Barr's letter to Congress and the public on March 24. In it, Mueller complained that the summary "did not fully capture the context, nature, and substance" of the Special Counsel's probe, adding, "There is now public confusion about critical aspects of the results of our investigation. This threatens to undermine a central purpose for which the Department appointed the Special Counsel: to assure full public confidence in the outcome of the investigations." Both before and after the release of Barr's summary, Mueller repeatedly tried to get Barr to release the report's introductions and executive summaries. Mueller's March 27 letter also stated that he had earlier sent a March 25 letter to Barr.

Mueller's March 27 letter prompted Barr to call Mueller on March 28. Barr clarified on the intention of his letter both in his phone call with Mueller and in another letter to Congress that his letter had not been intended to be a summary of the report, but rather a description of the principal findings of the report.

On April 9, Barr appeared in a congressional hearing before the House. There, Representative Charlie Crist described media reports that "members of the special counsel's team are frustrated at some level with the limited information included in your March 24 letter, that it does not adequately or accurately portray the [Mueller] report's findings." Crist asked Barr: "Do you know what they are referencing with that?" Barr replied: "No, I don't." On April 10, Attorney General Barr appeared before the Senate Appropriations Committee. Senator Chris Van Hollen asked Barr regarding obstruction: "Did Bob Mueller support your conclusion?" Barr replied: "I don't know whether Bob Mueller supported my conclusion."

The Department of Justice released a redacted version of the special counsel's report in the morning of April 18, 2019. After the release of the full report, fact-checkers and news outlets characterized Barr's initial letter as a deliberate mischaracterization of the Mueller Report and its conclusions. The New York Times reported instances in which the Barr letter omitted information and quoted sentence fragments out of context in ways that significantly altered the Mueller findings, including:

- A sentence fragment described only one possible motive for Trump to obstruct justice, while the Mueller report listed other possible motives.
- Omission of words and a full sentence that twice suggested there was knowing and complicit behavior between the Trump campaign and Russians that stopped short of coordination
- Omission of language that indicated Trump could be subject to indictment after leaving office, to suggest that Trump was cleared in full

According to the Associated Press, Barr misrepresented the report in several ways, saying the report gave no indication that Congress could make a determination on obstruction of justice (the report specifically stated "that Congress may apply obstruction laws") and that "these reports are not supposed to be made public" (when DOJ regulations give the AG wide authority in releasing reports such as this one). Barr falsely claimed in his summary of the report that "the White House fully cooperated with the Special Counsel's investigation." The Washington Post fact-checker described Barr's claim as "astonishing" and PolitiFact said it was "false". In actuality, Trump declined to grant the Special Counsel an in-person interview, and the Special Counsel report characterized Trump's written responses to interview questions as "inadequate". The report also documented numerous instances where Trump tried to either impede or end the Special Counsel investigation, analyzing each in terms of the three factors necessary for a criminal charge of obstruction.

During a press conference, Barr said Mueller's report contained "substantial evidence" that Trump was "frustrated and angered" because of his belief that the "investigation was undermining his presidency, propelled by his political opponents, and fueled by illegal leaks"; however, the report gave no indication that Trump's frustrations with the investigation would mitigate obstructing behavior. Barr also said it would not be criminal obstruction of justice for a president to instruct a staffer to lie to investigators about the president's actions, and suggested a president could legally terminate an investigation into himself if he was being "falsely accused".

On May 8, 2019, the House Judiciary Committee voted along party lines to hold Barr in contempt of congress for failing to comply with a subpoena which requested the full and unredacted Mueller Report. The matter then fell to the House of Representatives at-large for a contempt of Congress vote. The Justice Department took the position that disclosure of the unredacted Mueller Report would require the department to violate "the law, court rules and court orders" as well as grand jury secrecy rules.

During May 1, 2019, testimony before the Senate Judiciary Committee, Barr stated he accepted Mueller's interpretation of the law that was applied in the Report. However, in a May 30 CBS News interview, Barr said he had applied his own interpretation of the law and took the position that obstruction laws cannot apply to presidents who abuse their official powers to impede an investigation for a corrupt reason. Barr elaborated: "As a matter of law ... we didn't agree with the legal analysis – a lot of the legal analysis in the report. It did not reflect the views of the department."

In a December 2019 opinion piece, former FBI director, CIA director and federal judge William Webster wrote of "a dire threat to the rule of law in the country I love". Webster asserted that "the integrity of the institutions that protect our civil order are, tragically, under assault," writing that "aspersions cast upon [FBI employees] by the president and my longtime friend, Attorney General William P. Barr, are troubling in the extreme." Since 2005, Webster had served as the chair of the Homeland Security Advisory Council.

In March 2020, Reggie Walton, a federal district judge originally appointed by President George W. Bush, criticized Barr's characterizations of the Mueller report as "distorted" and "misleading". Walton made his comments while presiding over a lawsuit on whether the Mueller report should be released without redactions. As Walton saw it, Barr's "lack of candor" undermined Barr's "credibility and, in turn, the department's" arguments before the court. Walton had concerns that Barr may have made a "calculated attempt to influence public discourse" in favor of President Trump by establishing "a one-sided narrative" about the report contrary to the report's findings. Walton questioned if the report's redactions were actually "self-serving" to avoid conflict with Barr's statements, and if the Justice Department used "post-hoc rationalizations" to defend Barr. Kerri Kupec, the DOJ's spokesperson, said Walton's criticisms of Barr "were contrary to the facts" as the redactions were made by DOJ attorneys after they consulted Mueller's team, prosecutors, and other officials. On September 3, Walton ruled that the redaction of FBI reports of witness interviews was proper.

The March 24, 2019 Office of Legal Counsel memo

In May 2021, federal judge Amy Berman Jackson ruled that a March 24, 2019 Department of Justice memo must be published without redactions. Previously in April 2019, Barr said that his decision to not charge Trump was made "in consultation with the Office of Legal Counsel and other department lawyers". In this lawsuit, the Department of Justice argued that since Barr relied on the advice of this memo to make his decision, this memo should not be published unredacted. Jackson rejected this argument after reviewing the unredacted memo, stating that Barr could not have made the decision on the memo's advice, because the unredacted memo showed that the decision had already been made not to charge Trump. In addition, according to Jackson, the unredacted memo indicated that Barr did not have legitimate authority to make a prosecution decision regarding Trump. Jackson concluded that Barr had been "disingenuous" to Congress in 2019, and that the Department of Justice had been "disingenuous to this court" regarding their "decision-making process".

==== Spygate ====
In April 2019, Barr stated that he thought "spying did occur" against the Trump 2016 presidential campaign. The remark echoed false claims made by Trump and his supporters that the Trump campaign had been unfairly targeted or spied on by the FBI; Trump described it as an "attempted coup". There is no evidence that government officials engaged in "spying" on the Trump campaign. Barr later said he was not sure what spying had occurred and he did clarify what he meant by "spying". He also said he had no evidence of wrong-doing. Democrats criticized Barr's statement as "incendiary", saying the statement was intended to please Trump and that the statement lacked credibility following Barr's misrepresentation of the Mueller report in March 2019. Barr said he thought there was not "any pejorative connotation at all" to the term spying. At the time, Barr said he would not launch an investigation into the origins of the FBI probe into Russian interference in the 2016 election.

FBI officials denied Barr's claims about spying. FBI director Christopher A. Wray said he was unaware of any illegal surveillance by the FBI; he rejected the description of "spying". Subsequently, Trump retweeted a far-right pundit who said the FBI had "no leadership" and that Wray was "protecting the same gang that tried to overthrow the president in an illegal coup". Trump said Wray's statement was "ridiculous". Former FBI Director James Comey rebutted Barr, saying "The FBI doesn't spy. The FBI investigates."

In May 2019, Barr asserted, "Government power was used to spy on American citizens." Barr did not identify the specific actions prior to the 2016 election that he considered spying.

==== Contempt of Congress ====
On May 1, 2019, Assistant Attorney General Stephen Boyd told the House Oversight Committee that Barr had instructed Justice Department official John Gore to refuse a subpoena to testify in front of the committee. The committee subpoenaed Gore over the Trump administration's efforts to add a question on citizenship to the 2020 United States Census. The reason for the refusal was that the committee's decision to not allow a Justice Department lawyer to accompany Gore during testimony violated "the confidentiality interests of the Executive Branch" (though a separate room was permitted). In early June the House Oversight Committee moved to hold Barr in contempt of congress for defying a subpoena regarding the efforts to add a citizenship question to the census. In July 2019, the House of Representatives voted 230–198 to hold Barr (and Commerce Secretary Wilbur Ross) in criminal contempt of Congress, after they failed to produce documents as April 2019 congressional subpoenas mandated. The documents, on the planned (and eventually scrapped) citizenship question in the 2020 census, were withheld due to a "deliberative process" and "attorney-client communications", according to the Justice Department. President Trump also asserted executive privilege over the documents to withhold them from Congress. Only once prior has a sitting Cabinet member been held in criminal contempt of Congress (Eric Holder in 2012). The House instructed the Justice Department to prosecute Barr, but the Department refused.

==== Origins of the Russia investigation ====
Also in May 2019, Barr appointed John Durham, the U.S. attorney in Connecticut, to oversee a DOJ probe into the origins of the FBI investigation into Russian interference. The origins of the probe were already being investigated by the Justice Department's inspector general and by U.S. attorney John Huber, who was appointed in 2018 by Jeff Sessions. Democrats criticized the decision, with Senator Patrick Leahy saying, "Ordering a third meritless investigation at the request of Trump is beneath the office he holds." Trump ordered the intelligence community to cooperate with Barr's inquiry and granted Barr unprecedented full authority to declassify any intelligence information related to the matter. In April 2020, Barr asserted the FBI investigation had been opened "without any basis".

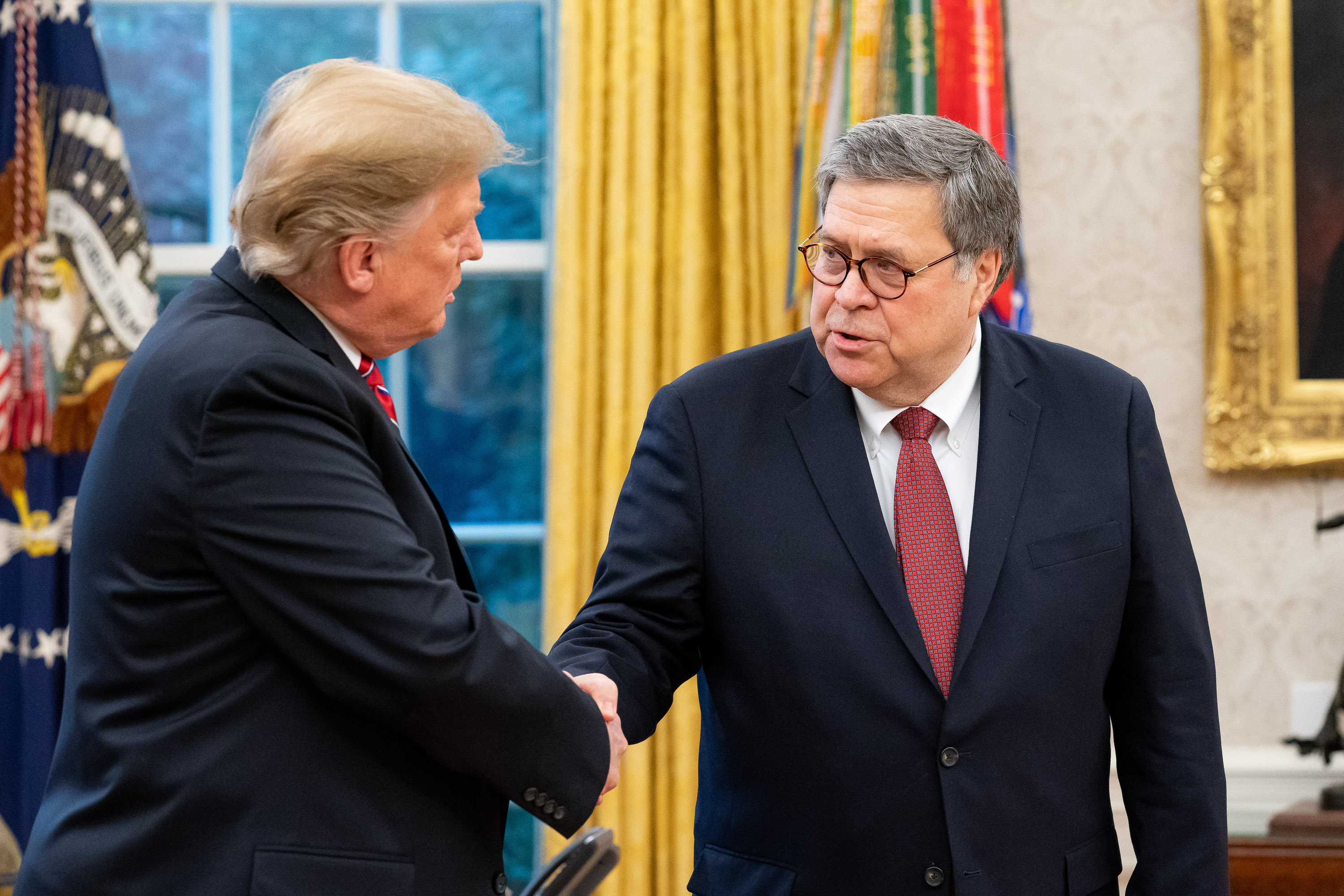
Bill Barr with Donald Trump, 2019

In September 2019, Barr was reported to have been contacting foreign governments to ask for help in this inquiry, including personally traveling to the United Kingdom and Italy to seek information. At Barr's request Trump phoned the prime minister of Australia to request his cooperation. Barr sought information related to a conspiracy theory that had circulated among Trump allies in conservative media asserting Joseph Mifsud was a Western intelligence operative who was allegedly directed to entrap Trump campaign advisor George Papadopoulos in order to establish a false predicate for the FBI to open an investigation into Russian interference in the 2016 United States elections. On October 2, 2019, Senator Lindsey Graham, a staunch Trump supporter and chairman of the Senate Judiciary Committee, wrote a letter to the leaders of Britain, Australia and Italy, asserting as fact that both Mifsud and Australian diplomat Alexander Downer had been directed to contact Papadopoulos. Joe Hockey, the Australian ambassador to the United States, sharply rejected Graham's characterization of Downer. A former Italian government official told The Washington Post in October 2019 that during a meeting the previous month, Italian intelligence services told Barr they had "no connections, no activities, no interference" in the matter; Italian prime minister Giuseppe Conte later affirmed this. One British official with knowledge of Barr's requests observed, "it is like nothing we have come across before, they are basically asking, in quite robust terms, for help in doing a hatchet job on their own intelligence services." The Washington Post reported on November 22, 2019, that the Justice Department inspector general had aggressively investigated the allegation that Mifsud had been directed to entrap Papadopoulos, but found it was without merit. The Post also reported the inspector general found the opening of the FBI's Crossfire Hurricane investigation was legally and factually predicated. The Post subsequently reported in December 2019 that Barr disagreed with the inspector general's conclusion that there was adequate evidence for the FBI to open its investigation. The Post also reported in December 2019 that the inspector general asked Durham and several American intelligence agencies if there was evidence of a setup by American intelligence, but they replied there was none.

On October 24, 2019, two sources told The New York Times that the Durham inquiry had been elevated to a criminal investigation. The Times reported on November 22 that the Justice Department inspector general had made a criminal referral to Durham regarding Kevin Clinesmith, an FBI attorney who had altered an email during the process of acquiring a wiretap warrant renewal on Carter Page, and that referral appeared to be at least part of the reason Durham's investigation was elevated to criminal status. Barr rejected criticism by Democrats in Congress that the transitioned investigation was designed to provide support to Trump during his impeachment inquiry in the Trump-Ukraine scandal. On August 14, 2020, Clinesmith pleaded guilty to a felony violation of altering an email used to maintain Foreign Intelligence Surveillance Act (FISA) warrants, having added the phrase "not a 'source'" to the original email. Carter Page had a prior operational relationship with the CIA from 2008 to 2013.

In November 2019, Justice Department inspector general Michael Horowitz concluded his investigation into the origins of the 2016 Russia probe, concluding that the investigation was not tainted by "political bias or improper motivation", and that the initial information gathered "was sufficient to predicate the investigation" given the "low threshold" for opening an investigation. Barr rejected the conclusions of the report, declaring that the investigation was started "on the thinnest of suspicions that, in [his] view, were insufficient to justify the steps taken". This also contradicted FBI director Chris Wray, who interpreted Horowitz's findings as the investigation having "appropriate predication and authorization".

In December 2019, Barr claimed in an interview with NBC News that the Russia investigation was "completely baseless" and said he believed the FBI's investigation may have been conducted in "bad faith". Barr also refused to refute the debunked conspiracy theory of Ukrainian interference in the 2016 election during the interview. In a subsequent interview on Fox News, Barr asserted, "the president bore the burden of probably one of the greatest conspiracy theories – baseless conspiracy theories – in American political history," despite the recent inspector general report debunking several conspiracy theories Trump and his allies had promoted.

In January 2020, Barr prohibited the start of counterintelligence investigations related to presidential campaigns unless both the attorney general and head of the FBI signed off on those investigations.

Barr defended Trump's April 2020 firing of intelligence community inspector general Michael K. Atkinson. Atkinson was the inspector general who sought to get the Trump administration to the disclose the Ukraine scandal whistleblower complaint to Congress. In defense of the firing, Barr allegedly made numerous false claims about Atkinson's actions during his tenure.

On May 18, 2020, Barr commented on prior investigations into potential collusion between Trump and Russia stating: "What happened to the president in the 2016 election and throughout the first two years of his administration was abhorrent ... it was a grave injustice and it was unprecedented in American history ... the law enforcement and intelligence apparatus of this country were involved in advancing a false and utterly baseless Russian collusion narrative against this president."

Barr hinted in June 2020 that the Durham investigation would produce results regarding the "complete collapse of the Russiagate scandal" before the end of the summer. In July he told a Congressional committee that the results of the investigation could be released before the election, despite an informal Justice Department rule limiting release of such information. In August, Trump in public comments appeared to be getting impatient for the investigation to produce more prosecutions and suggesting that his opinion of Barr will be negatively influenced if it does not. As summer ended there were reports that Barr was pressing for the Durham investigation to release its report. Colleagues of Durham have said they believe he is under pressure to produce something before the election. A top aide in the investigation quietly resigned on September 10; she gave no reason, but colleagues said she was concerned about political pressure from Barr. On September 18, 2020, four chairs of Democratic committees asked the DOJ inspector general to open an emergency investigation because "We are concerned by indications that Attorney General Barr might depart from longstanding DOJ principles to take public action related to U.S. Attorney Durham's investigation that could impact the presidential election," adding that Barr's public comments may have already violated that policy.

On November 2, 2020, the day before the presidential election, New York magazine reported that:

... there has been no evidence found, after 18 months of investigation, to support Barr's claims that Trump was targeted by politically biased Obama officials to prevent his election. (The probe remains ongoing.) In fact, the sources said, the Durham investigation has so far uncovered no evidence of any wrongdoing by Biden or Barack Obama, or that they were even involved with the Russia investigation. There 'was no evidence ... not even remotely ... indicating Obama or Biden did anything wrong,' as one person put it.

==== Intervention in cases of Trump associates ====
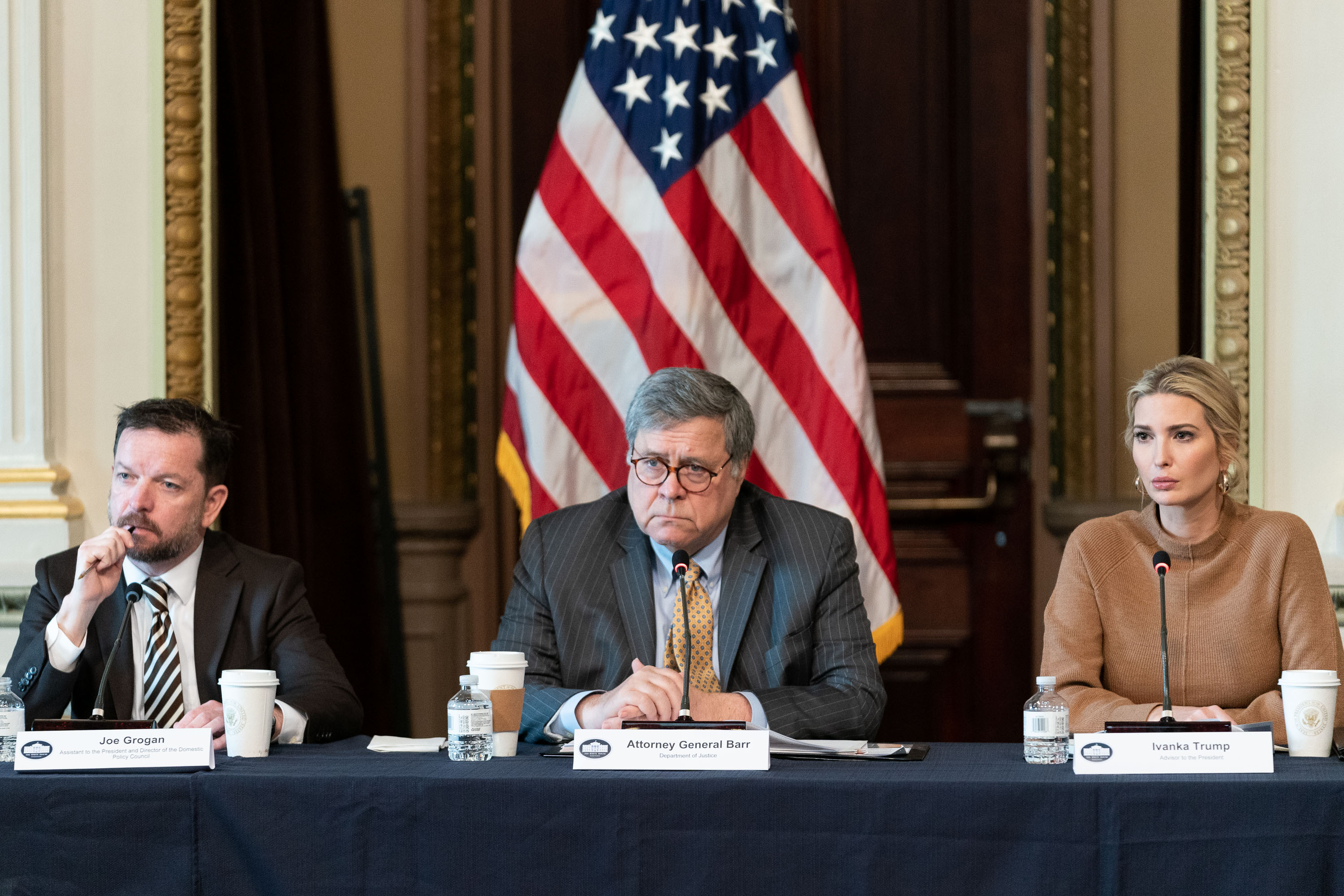
Barr with Joe Grogan (left) and Ivanka Trump (right), in 2020

In the spring of 2019, Barr reportedly attempted to undermine the conviction of Trump fixer Michael Cohen for campaign finance violations, detailed The New York Times in June 2020. Barr reportedly raised doubts multiple times about the validity of the charges against Cohen, including requesting the Office of Legal Counsel to draft a memo with legal arguments which could have helped Cohen's case. Barr's efforts were reportedly stemmed by the prosecutors of the Southern District of New York. Ultimately, Cohen's conviction was not changed.

In February 2020, President Trump directly referenced Barr in the Justice Department's intercession in recommending a lighter sentence for Trump's associate and old friend Roger Stone. Trump's tweet stated: "Congratulations to Attorney General Bill Barr for taking charge of a case that was totally out of control and perhaps should not have even been brought." Initially, four career prosecutors had recommended that Stone serve a jail term of between seven and nine years. A Trump tweet followed: "Cannot allow this miscarriage of justice!" – after which the department recommended an unspecified jail term. The department claimed that this later decision was made without consulting the White House. The prosecutors resigned from the case as a result, with one choosing to leave the department.

Barr affirmed that he had made the decision in the Stone case to change the sentencing memo. Barr said Trump had not asked him to step in, but noted that Trump's tweets and public comments make it impossible for the attorney general to do his job. "I think it's time to stop the tweeting about Department of Justice criminal cases," Barr said. Barr's rebuke of Trump's use of Twitter for interference in DOJ matters were seen as a rare departure from his usual unwavering support of the president. Barr's comments followed criticism of the department for its poor handling of the sentencing of Roger Stone after DOJ actions seen as favorable to Trump and his allies. Days later, a bipartisan group of more than 2,000 former DOJ employees signed a letter calling for Barr's resignation. while the Federal Judges Association of over a thousand federal jurists called an emergency meeting for February 18 to discuss their concerns about the intervention of Trump and Justice Department officials in politically sensitive cases. Despite Barr's rebuke of Trump, days later the president resumed denouncing the prosecutors, the judge, and the jury foreperson in the Stone case, while acknowledging that his comments made Barr's job harder. After granting several pardons, Trump also labeled himself as the country's "chief law enforcement officer", a description usually reserved for the attorney general.

Additionally in February 2020, Barr declared that there would be a review of the criminal case of Michael Flynn, the former national security advisor to Trump, who had pled guilty in 2017 to lying to the FBI about his contacts with a Russian ambassador. Flynn later attempted to withdraw his guilty plea, and had not been sentenced yet. Barr chose St. Louis's chief federal prosecutor, Jeffrey Jensen, to conduct the review. Jensen himself was nominated by Trump for the St. Louis position. Trump had publicly called for the charges to be dropped against Flynn. In late April or early May, Jensen recommended to Barr that the charges be dropped.

The Justice Department announced in May 2020 that the charges against Flynn would be dropped, with Jensen stating that Barr had agreed with his recommendation. Shortly after, Barr was asked in a media interview if given that Flynn "admitted lying to the FBI. Does the fact remain that he lied?" Barr replied that "people sometimes plead to things that turn out not to be crimes ... the Department of Justice is not persuaded that this was material to any legitimate counterintelligence investigation. So it was not a crime." Barr denied that he was carrying out the president's agenda on this case, stating that he was "doing the law's bidding". He also said that from this case, he wanted to show Americans that "there's only one standard of justice," instead of two standards of justice.

Between Trump's election and inauguration, Flynn had phone conversations with Russian ambassador Sergey Kislyak that were incidentally intercepted by American intelligence in the course of routine surveillance of Russian agents. Among other topics, Flynn discussed sanctions imposed on Russia by the Obama administration for Russian interference in the 2016 United States elections. Per policy regarding American persons, Flynn's identity was masked before accounts of his conversations were distributed to high-level Obama administration officials. Some officials, notably national security advisor Susan Rice, were so concerned by the accounts that they requested Flynn's identity be unmasked, per procedure. After the unmasking was reported by the press, Trump and his allies insisted it was evidence the Obama administration was spying on him and his associates for political purposes. In May 2020, Barr spokesperson Kerri Kupec announced on the program of Fox News host Sean Hannity that Barr had appointed U.S. attorney John Bash to investigate. She also stated that John Durham, whom Barr had appointed to investigate the origins of the FBI Crossfire Hurricane investigation, had also been examining the unmasking issue. The Bash investigation was quietly closed five months later, with no public announcement or report, reportedly finding nothing improper. Bash's 52-page report, previously classified top secret, was released in May 2022. Bash wrote he had found no evidence that any unmasking requests were made for any political or otherwise improper reasons during the 2016 election period or the ensuing presidential transition.

Barr's firing of Geoffrey Berman was widely condemned, given that the Southern District of New York was actively pursuing criminal investigations into several persons and companies associated with President Donald Trump and The Trump Organization. Barr's conduct was seen as sacrificing the independence of the Department of Justice to protect Trump and his allies. For these reasons, numerous groups have called for Barr's resignation, including the New York City Bar Association.

==== Ethics complaints ====
On October 3, 2019, Rep. Bill Pascrell Jr. filed ethics complaints against Barr with the District of Columbia Bar and Virginia Bar associations. On February 14, 2020, Citizens for Responsibility and Ethics in Washington filed an ethics complaint against Barr with the Department of Justice Office of Professional Responsibility and Office of the Inspector General, accusing Barr of "violating several Justice Department rules, guidelines and procedures". On July 22, 2020, a group of 27 "legal ethics experts and former government lawyers", including four former presidents of the District of Columbia Bar, also filed a complaint against Barr with the District of Columbia Bar. A bar association may take years to investigate an ethics complaint filed against a lawyer. If the District of Columbia Bar concludes that a lawyer has violated any of its Rules of Professional Conduct, that lawyer may be sanctioned in one of several ways, including admonition, suspension, and disbarment.

Sixty-five law professors and faculty from George Washington University Law School, Barr's alma mater, wrote in a June 2020 letter that he had "failed to fulfill his oath of office to 'support and defend the Constitution of the United States'". They wrote that Barr's actions as attorney general "have undermined the rule of law, breached constitutional norms, and damaged the integrity and traditional independence of his office and of the Department of Justice".

==== Halkbank Investigation and the firing of Geoffrey Berman ====
In June 2019, in violation of Department of Justice policy, Barr pressured Berman, then the U.S. attorney for the Southern District of New York, to drop an investigation into close allies of Turkish president Recep Tayyip Erdogan involved with the Turkish bank Halkbank. The bank and the individuals in question were alleged to have broken U.S. sanctions on Iran, funnelling billions of dollars to Iran and helping fund its nuclear ambitions. Erdogan himself personally insisted to President Trump that the Halkbank investigation be shut down on at least two occasions, November 1, 2018, at the G20 summit in Buenos Aires, and on a telephone call on December 14, 2018. According to former national security advisor John Bolton, a first-hand witness of many of the events in question, this sequence of events "does look like obstruction of justice".

In mid-June 2020, Barr announced that Geoffrey Berman, the court-appointed United States Aatorney for the Southern District of New York (SDNY), "is stepping down". Berman's office had been investigating both Trump's personal lawyer Rudy Giuliani and Trump's inaugural committee, as well as conducting a wider investigation into Trump's company and his associates after successfully prosecuting Michael Cohen, another personal lawyer of Trump. CNN also reported that Berman had prosecuted Halkbank despite Barr's attempt to try to avoid charges for the Turkish state-owned bank, after Turkish president Recep Tayyip Erdoğan requested Trump to help drop the charges. Simultaneously, Barr announced that at his recommendation, Trump had appointed Craig Carpenito as the interim SDNY U.S. attorney, in a departure from the tradition of a career prosecutor from SDNY taking the interim role. Also concurrently, Barr said that Trump would nominate Jay Clayton for the permanent role of SDNY U.S. attorney. Within a day, Berman said that he actually had "not resigned, and have no intention of resigning". Berman also said that he only learned of his supposed departure from Barr's public announcement. Barr then informed Berman that Trump had fired Berman at Barr's request. Barr did not give a reason for Berman's firing. As a result of the firing, the deputy SDNY U.S. attorney, Audrey Strauss, would become the interim SDNY U.S. attorney. With this, Berman agreed to leave. Meanwhile, the Senate indicated it would not confirm Clayton as the permanent replacement.

In a late Friday night statement on June 19, 2020, Barr stated that Berman was resigning and being replaced by Jay Clayton, citing Berman's behavior in the Halkbank episode as a primary reason for his removal. Berman learned of this through press reports and declined to resign; the next day, Barr asked Trump to fire Berman, which he promptly did. Berman was replaced by his deputy, Audrey Strauss. In November 2019, The Wall Street Journal reported Trump personal attorney Rudy Giuliani figured in an SDNY investigation into multiple possible felonies.

==== George Floyd protests ====
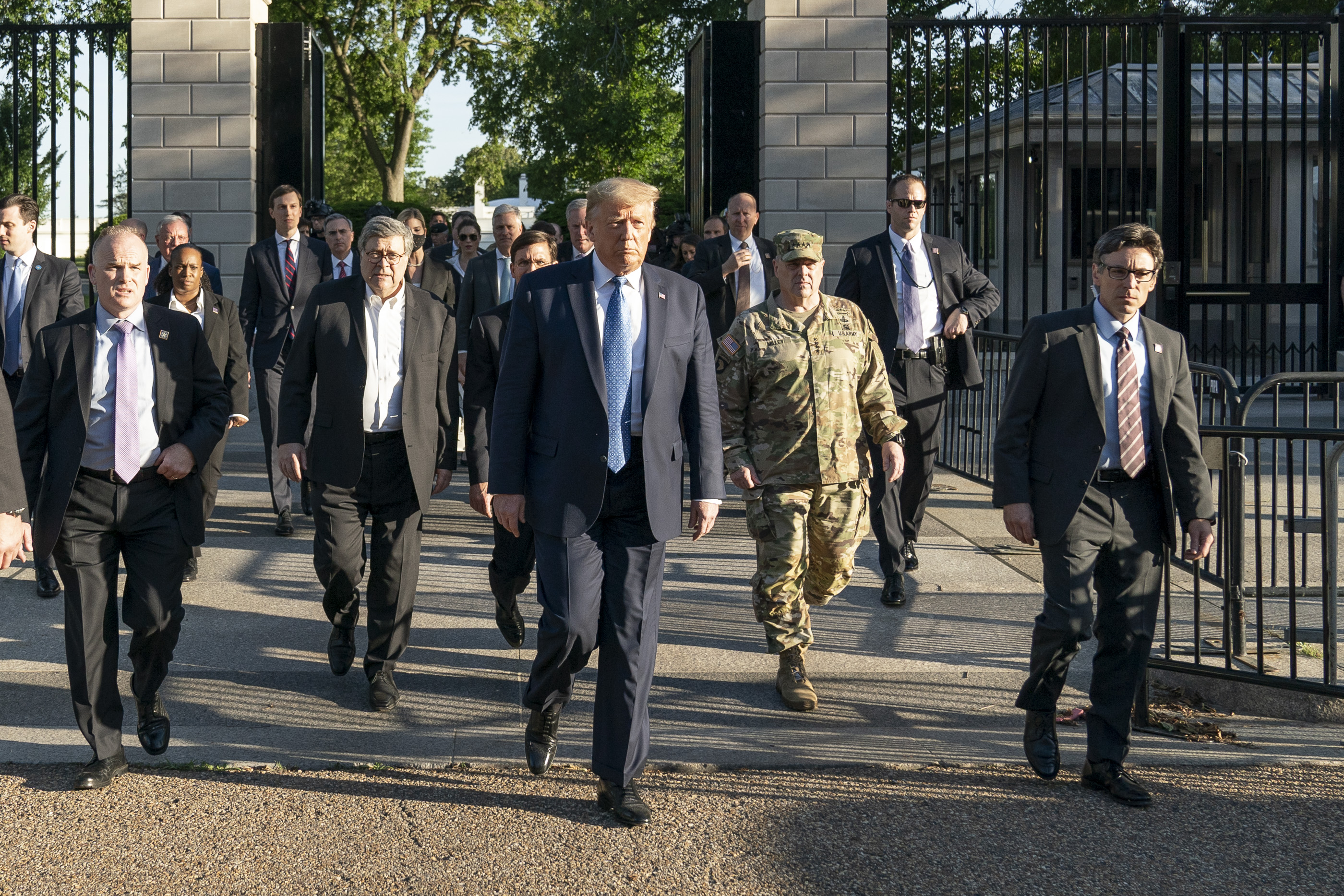
Barr joined Trump on his visit to St. John's Episcopal Church in June 2020.

In early June 2020, according to reporting by The Washington Post and Fox News, Barr personally ordered that the streets around Lafayette Square, Washington, D.C. should be cleared so that Trump, Barr and other administration officials could stage a photo op in front of St. John's Church. At the time, the streets were occupied by peaceful protesters as part of the George Floyd protests in Washington, D.C.; Barr's order resulted in federal law enforcement officers rushing protesters, and employing smoke canisters, pepper balls, riot shields, and batons against the protesters. Barr reacted to the incident by falsely claiming that pepper balls (used by law enforcement on protesters) were not chemical irritants (pepper balls contain pelargonic acid vanillylamide, a chemical irritant; while the product's manufacturer, and the Justice Department, both consider pepper balls a chemical irritant). On August 4, 2020, Barr and presidential adviser Ivanka Trump, and special advisor Heather Fischer announced the $35 million in grant awards to support victims of human trafficking at a White House event. During the roundtable, Barr became emotional and partly covered his face with his hand as survivors of human trafficking told their stories. In August 2020, he invoked qualified immunity before a federal court to protect himself from liability in a lawsuit regarding the Lafayette Square incident. A report by the U.S. Department of the Interior Office of Inspector General (OIG), released in June 2021, concluded that the clearing of the park by the Park Police and other forces was part of a plan to install "antiscale fencing" and had not been done so that Trump could stage a photo op in front of St. John's Church. The OIG report stated that OIG "cannot assess whether" Barr's visit to the park or any planned movement by Trump "influenced the Secret Service's actions, including its early deployment on to H Street."

In an August 2020 appearance on Fox News, Barr asserted that Black Lives Matter is "a revolutionary group that is interested in some form of socialism, communism. They're essentially Bolsheviks. Their tactics are fascistic." Barr equated the movement with antifa, characterizing that loose collective as "highly organized" and claiming "the media doesn't take footage of what's happening" at George Floyd protests. He also claimed that liberals are intent on "tearing down the system" and that the Democratic party was only "interested in total victory. It's a secular religion. It's a substitute for a religion." Barr had in June 2020 blamed antifa for orchestrating the George Floyd protests, but analysis by The New York Times found that no one arrested for serious federal crimes at the protests had been linked to antifa. Homeland Security Department secretary Chad Wolf said in September 2020 that he and Barr had discussed arresting leaders of antifa and the Black Lives Matter movement. The Wall Street Journal reported in September 2020 that Barr told federal prosecutors to consider charging violent protestors with plotting to overthrow the US government.

In an August 2020 interview, Trump falsely claimed that a plane full of "thugs in dark uniforms", implying antifa, had recently flown from one unidentified city to another with the intention of fomenting riots. His claim appeared to be based on months-old social media rumors. Two days later, Barr asserted he knew that antifa activists "are flying around the country" and "we are following them". The DHS report did not mention antifa.

On September 3, 2020, Trump ordered Barr to identify "anarchist jurisdictions", stating in a memorandum, "It is imperative that the federal government review the use of federal funds by jurisdictions that permit anarchy, violence, and destruction in America's cities." Days later, Barr designated New York City, Seattle and Portland, Oregon as such jurisdictions, suggesting they should lose their federal funding because, "We cannot allow federal tax dollars to be wasted when the safety of the citizenry hangs in the balance." Barr redirected federal homeland security and law enforcement resources to dealing with antifa, whereas the career law enforcement officials had long since concluded that the major domestic terrorism threat came from the far right.

==== 2020 presidential election ====
As attorney general, Barr sowed doubt about the integrity of the 2020 election. In a September 2020 interview, Barr falsely asserted the Justice Department had indicted a Texas man for fraudulently completing 1,700 mail-in ballots. There was no such indictment, and the matter actually involved a series of errors by election officials during a county election, rather than fraud. Barr also repeated a claim that foreign adversaries could flood the country with counterfeit ballots to disrupt the election, a threat that experts characterized as nearly impossible to execute. Senior American intelligence officials have said there was no evidence any foreign powers intended to manipulate mail-in voting. The day after Barr's interview, the Department of Homeland Security issued an intelligence bulletin warning that Russia is using social media and other venues to promote false claims that mail voting will lead to widespread fraud, in order "to undermine public trust in the electoral process". In a subsequent September 2020 interview, Barr stated that mail-in voting meant "we're back in the business of selling and buying votes" including "outright coercion, paying off a postman, here's a few hundred dollars, give me some of your ballots". On October 1, 2020, more than 1,600 former DOJ attorneys signed an open letter stating, "we fear that Attorney General Barr intends to use the DOJ's vast law enforcement powers to undermine our most fundamental democratic value: free and fair elections."

In September 2020, Barr asserted liberals were "projecting", referring to "all this bullshit about how the president is going to stay in office and seize power? I've never heard of any of that crap. I mean, I'm the attorney general. I would think I would have heard about it." During both the 2016 and 2020 campaigns, Trump was noncommittal when asked if he would accept election results showing he had lost. Days after Barr's remarks, Trump was asked if he would commit to a peaceful transition of power if he lost the 2020 election, to which he replied, "Well, we'll have to see what happens. You know that I've been complaining very strongly about the ballots. And the ballots are a disaster. Get rid of the ballots and you'll have a very peaceful – there won't be a transfer, frankly. There will be a continuation." In the days after his electoral defeat, Trump and his legal team led by Rudy Giuliani pursued an aggressive effort to overturn the results with dozens of lawsuits and numerous false and unsubstantiated assertions revolving around an international communist conspiracy, rigged voting machines, and polling place fraud to claim the election had been stolen from Trump.

After Joe Biden won the 2020 election and Trump refused to concede, baseless claims of voting fraud circulated. Barr sent a memo to DOJ prosecutors authorizing them to investigate "vote tabulation irregularities" before voting results had been certified, a reversal of long-standing department policy. Richard Pilger, director of the Election Crimes Branch at the DOJ Criminal Division, stepped down from that position in protest hours later. Four days later, sixteen assistant U.S. attorneys of the Branch wrote Barr a letter urging him to rescind the memo because it "thrusts career prosecutors into partisan politics". Barr later told a journalist that he had always expected Trump's electoral loss and never expected that Trump's fraud claims would have merit: "My suspicion all the way along was that there was nothing there. It was all bullshit." However, he asserted that because he expected Trump to ask him for details, he informally investigated to educate himself. Some asserted Barr's statements during the campaign suggested otherwise and that he was now attempting to rehabilitate his reputation. Barr waited until December 1, 2020, to state that the Justice Department "has not uncovered evidence of widespread voter fraud that would change the outcome of the 2020 presidential election". Trump was angered by the announcement and the fact that Durham had not released any findings prior to the election. Trump was also angered by news that Barr had followed Justice Department policy by not disclosing during the campaign that Joe Biden's son Hunter had since 2018 been under criminal investigation, initially on suspicion of money laundering but later for tax matters. On December 14, 2020, Trump announced on Twitter that Barr was stepping down from his post on December 23. After a pro-Trump mob stormed the U.S. Capitol after being incited by Trump, Barr said Trump had committed a "betrayal of his office".

==== Resignation ====
On December 14, 2020, Trump announced via Twitter that Barr would be resigning from his post as attorney general, effective December 23. Barr further confirmed his resignation in a letter to Trump on the same day. In summarizing his tenure, Katie Benner of The New York Times wrote that "Barr brought the Justice Department closer to the White House than any attorney general in a half-century ... Barr made decisions that dovetailed precisely with Mr. Trump's wishes and the demands of his political allies." CNN summarized his tenure similarly, "Barr repeatedly and unapologetically prioritized Trump's political goals while furthering his own vision of expansive presidential power." Ryan Lucas of NPR described Barr as "one of Trump's most loyal and effective defenders". As examples of Barr's actions on behalf of Trump, these critics pointed to the fact that Barr made frequent false claims about the integrity of mail-in voting leading up to the 2020 election, misleadingly summarized Special Counsel Robert Mueller's report on Russian interference in the 2016 election, harshly criticized those who had investigated Trump, meddled in criminal prosecutions of Trump allies, and ordered the use of force on peaceful protestors across the street from the White House during the George Floyd protests so that President Trump could have a photo op at nearby St. John's Church."

== Post-DOJ career ==
In 2022, it was reported that Barr would launch a law and consulting firm with former Facebook general counsel Ted Ullyot. This later became Torridon Law, which represented a variety of clients including George Mason University in response to the U.S. Department of Education's investigations around alleged violations of Title VI of the Civil Rights Act of 1964 and for discriminating "on the basis of national origin (shared Jewish ancestry) by failing to respond effectively to a pervasive hostile environment for Jewish students and faculty".

=== Comments on failed Sussmann prosecution ===
On June 1, 2022, Barr was interviewed on Fox News about the verdict in the failed prosecution of Michael Sussman. He continued to defend Trump by repeating debunked "Russiagate" conspiracy theories about the origins of the Russia investigation by stating that the case against Sussmann "crystallized the central role played by the Hillary campaign in launching, as a dirty trick, the whole Russiagate collusion narrative." The Washington Post noted that the Justice Department traditionally seeks to avoid impugning individuals who are not charged with crimes, and the DOJ is not involved in exposing political "dirty tricks" that have not been found unlawful. Barr also asserted Durham "exposed really dreadful behavior by the supervisors in the FBI, the senior ranks of the FBI, who knowingly use this information to start an investigation of Trump," though the Sussmann case did not relate to how the FBI Crossfire Hurricane investigation began. Although Barr appointed Durham to investigate possible FBI wrongdoing in opening Crossfire Hurricane, Durham's prosecution of Sussmann portrayed the FBI as a victim, rather than a perpetrator, of wrongdoing.

=== January 6 committee testimony ===
Barr testified to the House Select Committee on the January 6 Attack behind closed doors on June 2, 2022. Portions of his videotaped testimony were presented during the committee's public hearings days later. Barr testified that before resigning as attorney general, he had told President Trump that allegations of election fraud were "bullshit". At times during his testimony he could not control his laughter at the absurdity of some fraud allegations, such as the Italygate theory that satellites controlled from Italy had flipped votes from Trump to Biden, and that former Venezuelan president Hugo Chávez had orchestrated an election fraud scheme, despite having died seven years earlier. Barr testified Trump never gave "an indication of interest in what the actual facts were," adding the president had "become detached from reality if he really believes this stuff."

=== Investigation into Trump's handling of presidential documents ===
Barr has supported the FBI search of Mar-a-Lago and its investigation into the handling of presidential documents by Trump after his presidency, and dismissed Trump's calls for a special master to be appointed.

== Political positions ==
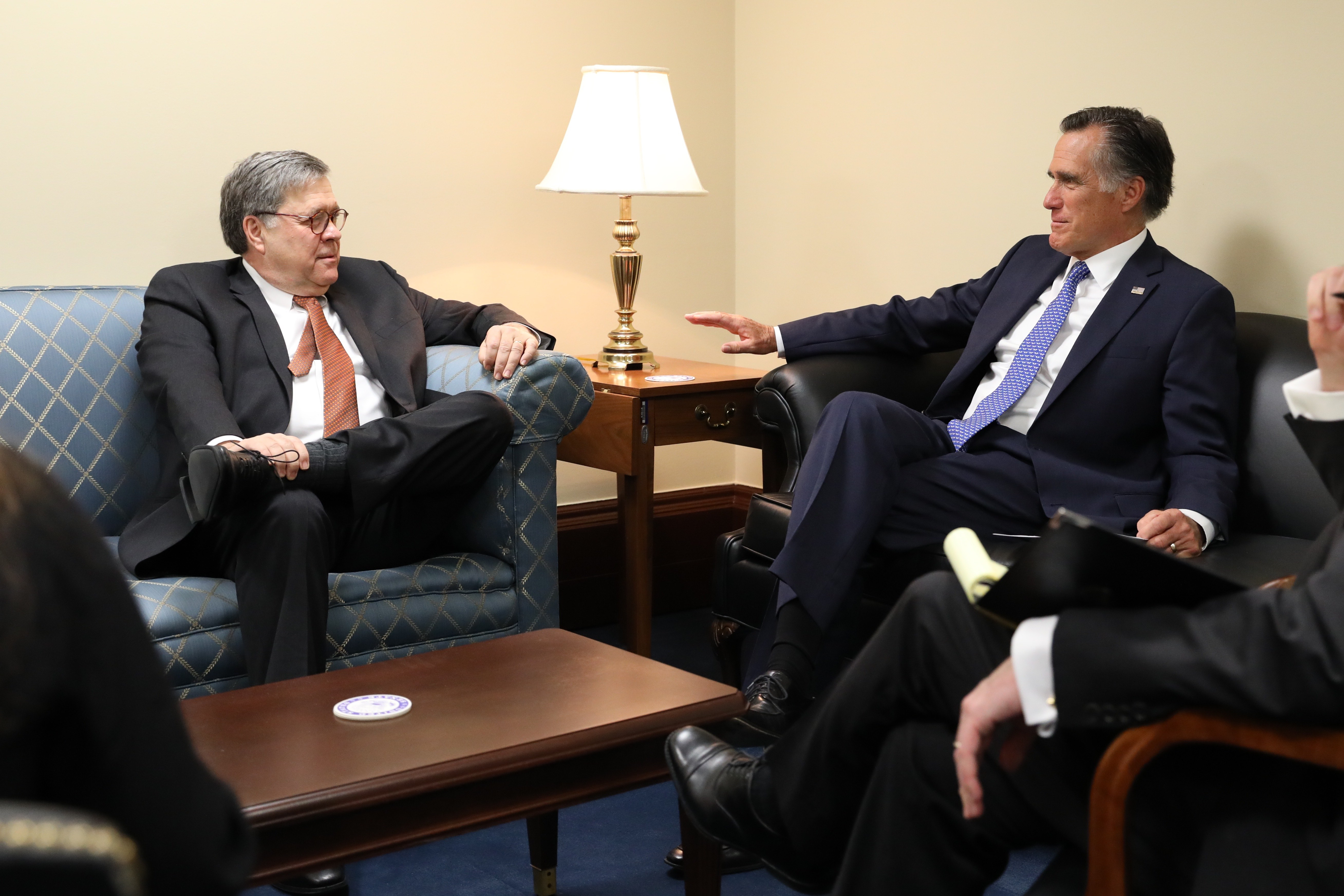
Barr with Senator Mitt Romney in February 2019

A lifelong Republican, Barr takes an expansive view of executive powers and supports "law and order" policies. Considered an establishment Republican at the time of his confirmation, Barr gained a reputation as someone loyal to Trump and his policies during his second tenure as attorney general. His efforts to support the sitting president politically during his DOJ office tenure have been viewed as the most strenuous since those of another law-and-order attorney general, John N. Mitchell.

=== Immigration ===
As deputy attorney general, Barr – together with others at the Department of Justice – successfully led the effort for the withdrawal of a proposed Department of Health and Human Services rule that would have allowed people with HIV/AIDS into the United States. He also advocated the use of Guantanamo Bay to prevent Haitian refugees and HIV infected individuals from claiming asylum in the United States. According to Vox in December 2018, Barr supported an aggressive "law and order" agenda on immigration as attorney general in the Bush Administration.

=== Death penalty ===
Barr supports the death penalty, arguing that it reduces crime. He advocated a Bush-backed bill that would have expanded the types of crime that could be punished by execution. In a 1991 op-ed in The New York Times, Barr argued that death row inmates' ability to challenge their sentences should be limited to avoid cases dragging on for years: "This lack of finality devastates the criminal justice system. It diminishes the deterrent effect of state criminal laws, saps state prosecutorial resources and continually reopens the wounds of victims and survivors."

On July 25, 2019, Barr announced that the United States federal government would resume its use of capital punishment under his leadership, after nearly two decades without an execution. Barr ordered the Department of Justice to adopt a new lethal injection protocol, consisting of a single drug (pentobarbital), and ordered execution dates to be set for five inmates in December 2019 and January 2020. On July 14, 2020, Daniel Lewis Lee became the first death row inmate executed by the federal government since 2003. Twelve more individuals were executed by the Trump administration. No administration in 120 years had overseen as many executions. Barr has been attributed as playing a key role in the administration's use of execution in prisons.

=== Social issues ===
==== Abortion ====
In 1991, Barr said he believed the framers of the Constitution did not originally intend to create a right to abortion, that Roe v. Wade was thus wrongly decided, and that abortion should be a "legitimate issue for state legislators". However, Barr said during his 1991 confirmation hearings that Roe was "the law of the land" and that he did not have "fixed or settled views" on the subject.

After Roe v. Wade was overturned, Barr suggested that a special counsel may be necessary to investigate the leak of the ruling and that the leaker may face criminal charges.

==== Drug policy ====
Barr supports a federal ban on marijuana. However, he has stated that the discrepancy between federal and state law is suboptimal, and that if a uniform federal ban on marijuana could not be achieved, then he would support the STATES Act on marijuana legalization. "I think it's a mistake to back off on marijuana ... However, if we want a federal approach, if we want states to have their own laws, then let's get there and let's get there the right way." Barr also said DOJ policy should align with congressional legislation.

=== 2016 election ===
Barr donated $55,000 to a political action committee that backed Jeb Bush during the 2016 Republican Party presidential primaries and $2,700 to Donald Trump during the general election campaign.

=== Executive powers ===
Barr is a proponent of the unitary executive theory, which holds that the president has broad executive powers. Prior to joining the Trump administration, he argued that the president has "complete authority to start or stop a law enforcement proceeding".

=== Race relations ===
In June 2020, amid the George Floyd protests against racism and police brutality, Barr said he rejected the view "that the law enforcement system is systemically racist". In a CNN news interview in September 2020, Barr denied that systemic racism plays a role in police shootings of unarmed African American men and called such shootings by white police officers "very rare". Derek Chauvin, the officer who murdered Floyd, was willing to agree to third-degree murder and serve more than ten years in prison. Barr rejected a plea deal.

In September 2020, Barr suggested bringing sedition charges against disruptive looters and rioters, a legal tool that is rarely used by the United States government. Sedition charges are normally reserved for those who "conspire to overthrow, put down, or to destroy by force the Government of the United States", according to (18 U.S.C. § 2384). Such suggestions have brought fears that Barr is politicizing the U.S. Justice Department and, if enacted, would mean that the Justice Department could prosecute individuals based on political speech.

=== China ===
In July 2020, Barr condemned large American tech companies, such as Google, Microsoft, Yahoo, and Apple, and Hollywood studios, accusing them of "kowtowing" to the Chinese Communist Party for the sake of profits. He said that "Hollywood now regularly censors its own movies to appease the Chinese Communist Party, the world's most powerful violator of human rights."

=== Venezuela ===
In March 2020, Barr described Venezuela under the Nicolás Maduro regime as a country plagued by criminality and corruption, and announced criminal charges against him, other Venezuelan officials, and some former Colombian FARC members for what he called "narco-terrorism". He accused Maduro and high-ranking Venezuelan officials of conspiring with the FARC to ship tons of cocaine into the US to wage a health war on American citizens. According to Barr, Venezuelan leaders and the FARC faction organised an "air bridge" from a Venezuelan air base transporting cocaine to Central America and a sea route to the Caribbean. Hours after the announcement, the Department of State offered $15 million for any information leading to the arrest of Maduro.

== Personal life ==
=== Family ===
Barr has been married to Christine Moynihan Barr since 1973. She holds a master's degree in library science, and together they have three daughters: Mary Barr Daly, Patricia Barr Straughn, and Margaret (Meg) Barr. Their eldest daughter, Mary, born 1977 or 1978, was a senior Justice Department official who oversaw the department's anti-opioid and addiction efforts; Patricia, born 1981 or 1982, was counsel for the House Agriculture Committee; and Meg, born 1984 or 1985, is a former Washington prosecutor and cancer survivor (of recurrent Hodgkin's lymphoma), was counsel for Republican Senator Mike Braun of Indiana.

In February 2019, as their father awaited Senate confirmation for his appointment as attorney general, Mary left her post at the Department of Justice as the Trump Administration's point woman on the opioid crisis and took a position at the Financial Crimes Enforcement Network (FinCEN), the Treasury Department's financial crimes unit. Her husband, however, continued to work in the Justice Department's National Security Division. Around the same time Mary left the Department of Justice, Tyler McGaughey, the husband of her youngest sister, left the U.S. Attorney's office in Alexandria, Virginia, to join the White House Counsel's office.

=== Religion ===
Barr is a Roman Catholic and is a member of the National Catholic Prayer Breakfast. Barr served from 2014 to 2017 on the board of the Catholic Information Center (CIC) of the Archdiocese of Washington, an Opus Dei center and nexus of politically connected Catholics on K Street. Opus Dei has denied that Barr is a member. However, his views in favor of the death penalty were criticised by the Jesuit magazine America.

Barr is an enthusiastic bagpiper. He began playing at age eight and has performed competitively in Scotland with a major American pipe band. At one time, Barr was a member of the City of Washington Pipe Band. During a US Attorneys' National Conference on June 26, 2019, Barr surprised attendees by standing up in the middle of an NYPD Emerald Society performance, and joined them in playing Scotland the Brave with a bagpipe.

Barr and Robert Mueller knew each other since the 1980s and were said to be good friends, until Mueller's death in 2026. Mueller attended the weddings of two of Barr's daughters, and their wives attend Bible study together.

== Honors ==
In 1992, he was awarded an honorary Doctor of Laws (LL.D) by George Washington University.

== Bibliography ==
- Barr, William P. (2022). One Damn Thing After Another: Memoirs of an Attorney General. New York: William Morrow. ISBN 978-0-06-315860-3.

== See also ==
- Russian interference in the 2020 United States elections
- Timeline of investigations into Donald Trump and Russia (January–June 2018)
- Timeline of investigations into Donald Trump and Russia (2019)
- Timeline of investigations into Donald Trump and Russia (2020–2021)
- Trump–Ukraine scandal

== Notes ==
Legal offices
Preceded by Douglas Kmiec	United States Assistant Attorney General for the Office of Legal Counsel; 1989–1990	Succeeded by J. Michael Luttig
Preceded by Donald B. Ayer	United States Deputy Attorney General; 1990–1991	Succeeded by George J. Terwilliger III
Preceded by Dick Thornburgh	United States Attorney General; 1991–1993	Succeeded by Janet Reno
Preceded by Jeff Sessions	United States Attorney General; 2019–2020	Succeeded by Merrick Garland
U.S. order of precedence (ceremonial)
Preceded by Lamar Alexander as Former U.S. Cabinet Member	Order of precedence of the United States as Former U.S. Cabinet Member	Succeeded by Andrew Card as Former U.S. Cabinet Member
