= Donald Barr =

American educator and author (1921–2004)

- Barr in a 1974 Dalton School yearbook
- Born: August 8, 1921; Manhattan, New York City, U.S.
- Died: February 5, 2004 (aged 82); Langhorne, Pennsylvania, U.S.
- Education: Columbia University (AB, MA)
- Occupation: Educator
- Known for: Headmaster of the Dalton School and the Hackley School
- Spouse: Mary Margaret Ahern
- Children: 4, including William and Stephen

Donald Barr (August 8, 1921 – February 5, 2004) was an American educator, writer, and Office of Strategic Services (OSS) officer. He was an administrator at Columbia University before serving as headmaster at the Dalton School in New York City and the Hackley School in Tarrytown, New York. He also wrote two science fiction novels. His sons are former United States attorney general William Barr and physicist Stephen Barr.

== Early life and education ==
Barr was born in Manhattan, New York City, the son of Estelle (née DeYoung), a psychologist, and Pelham Barr, an economist. He and his wife, Mary Margaret (née Ahern), had four children including William P. Barr (who served as the 77th U.S. attorney general in the George H. W. Bush administration and as the 85th U.S. attorney general in the first Donald Trump Administration) and particle physicist Stephen Barr.

Donald Barr was born to a Jewish family, but later converted to Catholicism. He sent his children to a Catholic elementary school and his son William would later describe him as "more Catholic than the Catholics".

Barr graduated from Columbia College in 1941 with a degree in mathematics and anthropology.

== Career ==
Barr served in the Office of Strategic Services (OSS) during World War II. Following the conflict, he returned to Columbia, where he earned a Master of Arts in English in 1950 and completed some course requirements for a Ph.D. in the discipline while also teaching in the English department. During this period, he also taught "courses with field work in sociology and political science at the School of Engineering" and wrote "science and mathematics texts for elementary and junior high school students". He initiated the Columbia University Science Honors Program in 1958 and was its director (as an assistant dean at the School of Engineering) until 1964. From 1963 to 1964, he also administered the National Science Foundation Cooperative College-School Program.

=== Dalton School ===
He was headmaster of the Dalton School from 1964 to 1974. Toward the end of his tenure as headmaster, he hired college dropout Jeffrey Epstein, who would later be convicted of sex trafficking, as a math and science teacher. In February 1974, Barr announced his resignation at the end of the school year. Epstein began working at Dalton in September 1974. At Dalton, Epstein tutored the children of Alan Greenberg, who later offered him a job at Bear Stearns.

=== Writing career ===
In 1973, Barr published Space Relations, a science fiction novel about a planet ruled by oligarchs who engage in child sex slavery. It has been noted that the plot of the novel anticipates the crimes of Epstein and his accomplice Ghislaine Maxwell.

Barr also reviewed books for The New York Times. In addition to his two science fiction novels, he sold two stories to The Magazine of Fantasy and Science Fiction; one of these (the 2002 "Sam") was reprinted in the 2003 anthology Year's Best Fantasy 3.

In 1983, President Ronald Reagan nominated Donald Barr to be a member of the National Council on Educational Research.

== Selected works ==
- The How and Why Wonder Book of Atomic Energy (1961)
- Who Pushed Humpty Dumpty? Dilemmas in American Education (1971)
- Space Relations: A Slightly Gothic Interplanetary Tale (1973)
- A Planet in Arms (1981)
