= A Planet in Arms =

1981 novel by Donald Barr

A Planet in Arms is a science fiction novel by American writer Donald Barr, published in 1981.

== Plot summary ==
A Planet in Arms is a novel in which Rohan's Planet has just won a revolution against the Terran Empire of Earth and established a new government.

== Reception ==
Greg Costikyan reviewed A Planet in Arms in Ares Magazine #9 and commented that "A Planet in Arms is a superb book."

== Reviews ==
- Review by Baird Searles in Asimov's Science Fiction magazine (Sep. 28, 1981).
