= 1954 in science fiction =

The year 1954 was marked, in science fiction, by the following events.

== Births and deaths ==
=== Births ===
- Iain M. Banks (d. 2013)
- Marek Baraniecki
- Maya Kaathryn Bohnhoff
- Paul Di Filippo
- Colin Greenland
- Marek Huberath
- Kazuo Ishiguro
- Michael P. Kube-McDowell
- Shariann Lewitt
- James D. Macdonald
- Ken MacLeod
- Victor Milán (d. 2018)
- John J. Miller (d. 2022)
- Katsuhiro Otomo
- Melanie Rawn
- Joel Rosenberg (d. 2011)
- Richard Paul Russo
- Bruce Sterling
- Marc Stiegler
- J. Michael Straczynski
- Mark W. Tiedemann
- James Van Pelt
- Lawrence Watt-Evans
- David Wingrove

=== Deaths ===
- Alexander Abasheli (b. 1884)
- Alpheus Hyatt Verrill (b. 1871)

== Literary releases ==
- Donald Tuck publishes Handbook of Science Fiction and Fantasy, which is still used as a reference resource for scholars of science fiction.

=== Serialized novels ===
- Martians, Go Home by Fredric Brown, Astounding Science Fiction (September), published in book form is 1955.
- Question and Answer, Astounding Science Fiction (June–July), later reprinted in 1956 as part of Ace Double D-199 under the title Planet of No Return, and again as a stand-alone Ace novel in February 1978 under the original title.
- They'd Rather Be Right by Mark Clifton and Frank Riley, Astounding Science Fiction (August–November), published in book form in 1957.

=== First editions ===
- Brain Wave by Poul Anderson, Earth's inhabitants become super-intelligent when the planet leaves a restrictive energy field.
- The Caves of Steel by Isaac Asimov, a detective and a robot partner solve a murder in a futuristic city.
- The Forgotten Planet by Murray Leinster, survivors adapt to a planet overrun by giant insects and plants.
- G.O.G. 666 by John Taine, Russian genetics experiments result in a being that is half ape, half brain.
- I Am Legend by Richard Matheson, the last human battles vampires in a post-apocalyptic world.
- A Mirror for Observers by Edgar Pangborn, follows a child prodigy protected by a Martian guardian from rival factions influencing human civilization.
- Mission of Gravity by Hal Clement, a human and an alien collaborate on a high-gravity planet to recover a lost probe.
- Operation: Outer Space by Murray Leinster, the first interstellar flight is financed by making it into a television show.
- Search the Sky by Frederik Pohl and Cyril M. Kornbluth, a secret ship explores and reconnects declining interstellar colonies to prevent societal decay.
- The Stars Are Ours! by Andre Norton, survivors of an oppressive regime escape Earth to settle on a new planet.
- Starship Through Space by Lee Correy, tells the story of the building of the first starship and of its flight to Alpha Centauri.
- Three Thousand Years by Thomas Calvert McClary, scientists attempt to build a utopia after the earth has been placed in suspended animation for 3,000 years.

=== Short stories ===
- "The Cold Equations" by Tom Godwin, Astounding Science Fiction (August).
- "The Father-thing" by Philip K. Dick, The Magazine of Fantasy & Science Fiction (December).
- "Fondly Fahrenheit" by Alfred Bester, The Magazine of Fantasy & Science Fiction (August).
- "No More Stars" by Charles Satterfield, Beyond Fantasy Fiction (July).

=== Juveniles ===
- Return to the Lost Planet by Angus MacVicar, second novel of six in the Lost Planet series.
- The Secret of Saturn's Rings by Donald A. Wollheim, a high school graduate joins his father on a mission to Saturn to prove a corporate cover-up.
- The Star Beast by Robert A. Heinlein (juvenile), a boy discovers his pet is an alien royalty, leading to interstellar diplomacy.

=== Children's books ===
- Mel Oliver and Space Rover on Mars by William Morrison, the adventures of a boy and his sapient dog as they join an interplanetary circus on a voyage to Mars.
- The Wonderful Flight to the Mushroom Planet by Eleanor Cameron, children travel to a hidden planet and help its inhabitants solve a crisis.

== Movies ==
Title	Director	Cast	Country	Subgenre/Notes
20,000 Leagues Under the Sea	Richard Fleischer	Kirk Douglas, James Mason, Paul Lukas	United States	Adventure Drama Family Fantasy (Note: Winner of Academy Awards for Visual Effects and Best Art Direction in 1954.)
Creature from the Black Lagoon	Jack Arnold	Richard Carlson, Julie Adams, Richard Denning, Antonio Moreno	United States	Horror
Devil Girl from Mars	David MacDonald	Patricia Laffan, Hugh McDermott, Adrienne Corri	United Kingdom	Horror
Godzilla (a.k.a. Gojira)	Ishirō Honda	Akira Takarada, Momoko Kōchi, Takashi Shimura	Japan	Horror Kaijū
Gog	Ivan Tors	Richard Egan, Constance Dowling, Herbert Marshall	United States	Drama Horror Romance Thriller
Killers from Space	W. Lee Wilder	Peter Graves, Barbara Bestar, James Seay, Frank Gerstle	United States	Horror Mystery
Monster from The Ocean Floor	Wyott Ordung	Anne Kimball, Stuart Wade, Dick Pinner	United States	Horror
Riders to the Stars	Richard Carlson	William Lundigan, Herbert Marshall	United States	Drama
The Rocket Man	Oscar Rudolph	Charles Coburn, Spring Byington, Anne Francis, John Agar, George Winslow	United States	Comedy Famille
The Snow Creature	W. Lee Wilder	William Phipps	United States	Horror
Stranger From Venus	Burt Balaban	Patricia Neal, Helmut Dantine, Derek Bond	United States	
Target Earth	Sherman A. Rose	Richard Denning, Kathleen Crowley, Virginia Grey	United States	Horror
Them!	Gordon Douglas	James Whitmore, Edmund Gwenn, Joan Weldon, James Arness	United States	Horror
Tobor the Great	Lee Sholem	Charles Drake, Karin Booth, Billy Chapin	United States	Adventure Family

== Awards ==
The Hugo Awards were not held this year.

== See also ==
- 1954 in science
