= Before the Golden Age =

1974 anthology edited by Isaac Asimov

- First edition cover
- Editor: Isaac Asimov
- Language: English
- Genre: Science fiction
- Publisher: Doubleday
- Publication date: April 1974
- Publication place: United States
- Media type: Print (hardback & paperback)
- Pages: 986
- ISBN: 0-385-02419-3
- OCLC: 972848
- Dewey Decimal: 813/.0876
- LC Class: PZ1.A815 Be PS648.S3

Before the Golden Age: A Science Fiction Anthology of the 1930s is an anthology of 25 science fiction stories from 1930s pulp magazines, edited by American science fiction writer Isaac Asimov. It also includes "Big Game", a short story written by Asimov in 1941 and never sold. The anthology was first published in April 1974, and won the 1975 Locus Award for Best reprint anthology.

The anthology was inspired by a dream Asimov had on the morning of 3 April 1973. In his dream, Asimov had prepared an anthology of his favorite science fiction stories from the 1930s and was delighted to get a chance to read them again. After waking, he told his fiancée Janet Jeppson about the dream, and she suggested that he actually do such an anthology. Doubleday agreed to publish the anthology, and Asimov's friend Sam Moskowitz provided him with copies of the relevant science fiction magazines. Asimov completed work on the anthology on 10 May.

The stories were selected by Asimov, and the main selection criterion was the degree to which they influenced him when he was growing up in the 1930s. The prefatory material and individual introductions to the stories fill in the details about the early life of the child prodigy, which effectively makes the volume an autobiographical prequel to his earlier collection The Early Asimov.

The anthology was first published as a large hardcover by Doubleday in 1974 and re-issued as three smaller paperbacks by Fawcett Books the following year. The series was re-issued multiple times between 1975 and '84 in sets of either three or four paperbacks. As of 2018, it is out of print.

== Contents ==
In addition to the 26 stories, the anthology includes introductions and extensive commentary by Asimov.

=== 1931 ===
- "The Man Who Evolved" by Edmond Hamilton
- "The Jameson Satellite" by Neil R. Jones
- "Submicroscopic" by Capt. S.P. Meek
- "Awlo of Ulm" by Capt. S.P. Meek
- "Tetrahedra of Space" by P. Schuyler Miller
- "The World of the Red Sun" by Clifford D. Simak

=== 1932 ===
- "Tumithak of the Corridors" by Charles R. Tanner
- "The Moon Era" by Jack Williamson

=== 1933 ===
- "The Man Who Awoke" by Laurence Manning
- "Tumithak in Shawm" by Charles R. Tanner

=== 1934 ===
- "Colossus" by Donald Wandrei
- "Born of the Sun" by Jack Williamson
- "Sidewise in Time" by Murray Leinster
- "Old Faithful" by Raymond Z. Gallun

=== 1935 ===
- "Parasite Planet" by Stanley G. Weinbaum
- "Proxima Centauri" by Murray Leinster
- "The Accursed Galaxy" by Edmond Hamilton

=== 1936 ===
- "He Who Shrank" by Henry Hasse
- "The Human Pets of Mars" by Leslie Frances Stone
- "The Brain Stealers of Mars" by John W. Campbell
- "Devolution" by Edmond Hamilton
- "Big Game" by Isaac Asimov (written in 1941)

=== 1937 ===
- "Other Eyes Watching" by John W. Campbell
- "Minus Planet" by John D. Clark
- "Past, Present, and Future" by Nat Schachner

=== 1938 ===
- "The Men and the Mirror" by Ross Rocklynne

== Reception ==
Theodore Sturgeon praised the anthology as "uniquely and delightfully Asimov," describing it as "a much-wanted aggregate of the long-remembered, mostly long-lost masterpieces of ragged-pulp sf which fired up so many of the writers [from] the Golden Age of John Campbell's Astounding." Alexei and Cory Panshin described Before the Golden Age as "a book that needed doing," saying that Asimov was perhaps the only writer who "could have the clout and the personal investment of love necessary to produce an anthology like this."

Gerald Jonas, however, reviewing the anthology and related books for The New York Times, noted that "a little of this looking backward goes a long way," faulting "the defects of style, the prolixities, [and] the flaws of narrative construction" in the stories. (Asimov, in his introduction to the book, had cheerfully conceded these stories to be "clumsy, primitive, and naive", "old-fashioned and unsophisticated".)
