= Sidewise in Time (collection) =

- Dust-jacket from the first edition
- Author: Murray Leinster
- Cover artist: Hannes Bok
- Language: English
- Genre: Science fiction
- Publisher: Shasta Publishers
- Publication date: 1950
- Publication place: United States
- Media type: Print (hardback)
- Pages: 211 pp
- OCLC: 982229

Sidewise in Time is a 1950 collection of science fiction short stories by Murray Leinster. It was first published by Shasta Publishers in 1950 in an edition of 5,000 copies. The stories all originally appeared in the magazines Astounding and Thrilling Wonder Stories.

== Contents ==
- "Sidewise in Time"
- "Proxima Centauri"
- "A Logic Named Joe"
- "De Profundis"
- "The Fourth-Dimensional Demonstrator"
- "The Power"

== Reception ==
L. Sprague de Camp declared Sidewise "a fine entertaining collection," although he dismissed "Proxima Centauri" as a "bottom of the trunk" piece.
