= List of fictional works featuring parallel universes =

Parallel universes (or the multiverse) are a common plot device in fiction. This is a list of notable fictional works which feature parallel universes as a plot element.

== Short stories ==
Year	Title	Author(s)	Description
1934	Sidewise in Time	Murray Leinster	The story follows an apocalyptic event where aspects of one timeline manifest in others.
1968	All the Myriad Ways	Larry Niven	Police Detective Lieutenant Gene Trimble investigates a rash of suicides brought on by the discovery of parallel Earths. Published in Galaxy and later the anchor story in a collection of short stories.

== Novels ==
Year	Title	Author(s)	Description
1962	Man In the High Castle	Philip K. Dick	Imagines a world in which the Axis powers won World War II. This happens in the parallel universe. In the end we don't know really which world is real.
1975	The Female Man	Joanna Russ	The four protagonists move between parallel worlds using "probability travel".
1977–	Xanth series	Piers Anthony	Xanth is a world governed by magic that coexists with Mundania, a world very much like our own.
1980–1990	Apprentice Adept series	Piers Anthony	Phaze and Proton are two parallel worlds in different dimensions, one magical the other highly technological. If a person in one world lacks a counterpart in the other they can cross to the other world.
1999	Timeline	Michael Crichton	21st century history students use "quantum technology" to travel to 14th century France in a parallel universe where time has progressed less quickly than ours.
2020	The Space Between Worlds	Micaiah Johnson	Features a young woman, Cara who is able to travel between different versions of Earth, but only versions where her counterpart has already died. In Cara's case she is unusual in that in most of the known worlds she is already dead, and this gives her value.
2022	Wakers	Orson Scott Card	Protagonist Laz grew up with the ability to shift his consciousness to versions of himself in alternate worlds a skill which he uses to select worlds with better outcomes. As the novel begins a clone of Laz wakes up from a suspended animation chamber on a near empty doomed version of Earth.
2020	Overstrike	C. M. Angus	Overstrike by C. M. Angus features high-functioning schizophrenics with the ability to simultaneously perceive multiple realities.

== Films ==
Year	Title	Director(s)	Description
2001	The One	James Wong	The film follows rogue interdimensional cop Gabriel Yulaw, who attempts to kill all 124 of his alternate universe counterparts and absorb their power to become a god-like being known as the "One".
2018	Spider-Man: Into the Spider-Verse	Bob Persichetti, Peter Ramsey, and Rodney Rothman	Several parallel universe versions of Spider-Man from within the film's multiverse are depicted.
2019	Yesterday	Danny Boyle	Struggling singer songwriter wakes up from an accident only to discover that he’s the only one alive who remembers the Beatles.
2021	Spider-Man: No Way Home	Jon Watts	The film features the MCU version of Peter Parker/Spider-Man meeting characters from Sam Raimi's Spider-Man film trilogy and Marc Webb's The Amazing Spider-Man film duology, eventually having all three versions of Spider-Man teaming up.
2022	Doctor Strange in the Multiverse of Madness	Sam Raimi	The film features Doctor Strange and America Chavez traveling between several parallel universes of the MCU multiverse.
2022	Everything Everywhere All at Once	Daniel Kwan and Daniel Scheinert	The film follows Evelyn Quan Wang, a Chinese-American laundromat owner who travels between universes and draws knowledge from her alternate universe counterparts.
2024	I Saw the TV Glow	Jane Schoenbrun	Main characters Owen and Maddy slowly realize that they are living false lives trapped in a pocket dimension within the world of their favorite TV show, The Pink Opaque, having been imprisoned there by series antagonist Mr. Melancholy.
2024	Deadpool & Wolverine	Shawn Levy	The film involves Wade Wilson / Deadpool from the Deadpool film series being transported to the Marvel Cinematic Universe. An alternate universe variant of Logan / Wolverine also appears, separate from the versions of the character who appeared in the X-Men film series and Logan.

== Television series ==
Airdates	Title	Description
1963–1989, 1996, 2005–present	Doctor Who	The series' 1970 serial Inferno features a parallel universe where a drilling project, introduced in our reality, results in the penetration of the Earth's crust and causes the ultimate destruction of the planet. In the revived series, the 2006 Series 2 two-parter "Rise of the Cybermen" and "The Age of Steel" features a parallel universe where London's skies are filled with Zeppelins and where a successful company, which has a monopoly over cyber technology, attempts to convert the population of London into newly developed Cybermen. A two-parter later in the series, "Army of Ghosts" and "Doomsday", features a return of this universe.
1966–present	Star Trek franchise	First introduced in the original series episode “Mirror, Mirror”, Star Trek features the recurring Mirror Universe, where humanity developed to be violent and opportunistic, leading to aggressive expansion and the subjugation of alien races into the Terran Empire. The Mirror Universe has been revisited in Deep Space Nine, Enterprise, Discovery and Prodigy. The TNG episode "Parallels" introduced the infinite multiverse to the franchise.
1989	Dragon Ball Z	In the Androids Saga, Future Trunks returns to the past to give Goku medicine to prevent him from dying of a heart disease and warns him of the Androids, in the process creating a timeline split of parallel realities. This event leads to the appearance of Cell, who kills the same Future Trunks after he originally returns from the past of and kills the Androids via a remote control in his own timeline. Cell does this to go to the main timeline of the series when the Androids are still alive for him to absorb. Back in the same past the series follows, Future Trunks discovers the existence of the time machine Cell stole in the original future reality, leading him to make the decision to stay in past instead. This creates a parallel reality for his own future timeline where he is physically capable of killing both the Androids and Cell once he returns after the events of the Cell Saga.
1995	Spellbinder	The series follows the adventures of Sydney high-schooler Paul Reynolds as he is accidentally stranded in a parallel world where the industrial revolution never happened. Only a small number of people there have technology – the "Spellbinders" – and they pretend it is magic and use it to rule over everyone else, manipulating people's fear and ignorance. Paul, with the help of a local girl called Riana, uses his wits and his own knowledge of science to survive, whilst his high-school friends try to rescue him.
1997	Spellbinder: Land of the Dragon Lord	The series follows Kathy who decides to explore an unusual boat that she discovers next to a lake, she is accidentally pulled from her home in Australia into a parallel universe. The new world she finds herself in is populated by ethnic Chinese, who possess advanced technology, including a talking computer called the "Oracle" that runs the empire. Kathy spends most of her time trying to evade dangerous people in different parallel worlds, return to her own world, and reunite with her family. She is further antagonised by Ashka, a cunning and manipulative woman who has escaped from prison in her own world (for her crimes in the first series) and who seeks to gain advantage for herself. The series also depicts a journey Sun takes to Kathy's world, where he is no longer protected by his empire, and people do not respect his authority.
1997–1998	Magic Mountain	The series follows the adventures of four national but iconic creatures of China; Dragon, Lion, Panda, and Tortoise – four friends having lots of fun with a little Dragon magic thrown in. These four creatures "enjoy wonderful times as they invent unusual games, play tricks on each other, and have exciting adventures as they explore their enchanting world."
1995–2000	Sliders	Quinn Mallory (Jerry O'Connell) invents a device that allows one to travel to alternate versions of Earth via wormhole device. He's (initially) accompanied by his close friend Wade Welles, his mentor Professor Maximillian Arturo (John Rhys-Davies) and accidentally by professional singer Rembrandt "Crying Man" Brown. A key plot device is that Mallory's controller has lost the coordinates of Mallory's home world and that it times down to the next wormhole opening, providing a limited opportunity for the "sliders" to escape their current situation and slide to the next world.
2004	Parallax	The series is about a boy named Ben Johnson, who discovers a portal to multiple parallel universes, and explores them with his friends: Francis Short, Melinda Bruce, Una, Due, Tiffany and Mundi as well as newfound sister, Katherine Raddic.
2004	Awake	The series is about a detective who works for the Los Angeles Police Department who switches between two realities, one in which his wife has died and one in which his son has died. He uses details from each reality to solve cases in the other.
1997-2007	Stargate SG-1	The series features multiple episodes on the topic, in first of which Dr. Daniel Jackson travels to an alternate reality by accidentally activating a device called Quantum Mirror.
2007	Bokurano: Ours	The series features giant mecha battles between parallel universes in a cross-universal tournament.
2013–2018	Nowhere Boys	The series is about four boys, goth Felix Ferne, nerd Andrew "Andy" Lau, golden child Sam Conte, and alpha jock Jake Riles, after returning home from a school excursion, find themselves in an alternate reality where no one recognises them. They battle mystical threats and demons to find their way back home.
2013-present	Rick And Morty	The series follows the inter-dimensional adventures of sociopathic Rick and his anxious grandson, Morty. Using a portal gun, they are able to hop between universes and frequently encounter alternate versions of themselves and other relatives. Rick C-137 and the early stage Council of Ricks fenced off a finite subset of infinite universes called the “Central Finite Curve” - where Rick is the smartest being alive.
2014–2017	Penn Zero: Part-Time Hero	The series follows Penn Zero and his friends Sashi Kobayashi and Boone Wiseman as they travel between universes and assume the forms of each world's heroes.
2015	Dragon Ball Super	The sequel to Dragon Ball Z introduces 12 separate universes that are numbered from 1 to 12 and form matching pairs where each pair's numbers add up to 13. The universe that the main characters live in is Universe 7, which is paired with Universe 6. Previously there were 18 universes, but Zeno (the supreme ruler of the Dragon Ball Multiverse) destroyed 6 of them in a fit of rage. Zeno eventually arranges a massive battle royal tournament between eight of the universes, in which the losing universes are destroyed.
2017	Re:Creators	The series features fictional characters from popular in-universe media traveling from their respective narrative universes to contemporary Japan.
2018	The Girl in Twilight	The series follows five girls who discover a way to travel between parallel universes using a radio. They soon find themselves drawn into a multiversal war against a cosmic force known only as the "Twilight".
2021	Wonder Egg Priority	
2024–present	Dark Matter	The series follows Jason Dessen, a physicist who is captured and replaced by his alternate self and travels through numerous alternate universes while attempting to return home.
2025	Mobile Suit Gundam GQuuuuuuX	The sixteenth main entry in the Gundam franchise is set in an alternate universe version of the Universal Century (the series' original timeline), which is later revealed to be one of many split timelines created by Lalah Sune in pursuit of a universe where Char Aznable was not killed.
2026	Super Space Sheriff Gavan Infinity	The series follows Reiji Doki/Gavan Infinity as he travels between several parallel universes to investigate incidents involving Nega Emorgears, often teaming up with the local Gavans.

== Video games ==
Year	Title	Developer(s)	Description
2002–present	Kingdom Hearts series	Square Enix/The Walt Disney Company	A core element of the series is Sora, Donald Duck, and Goofy traveling to the worlds of various Disney properties within the Realm of Light. While doing so, the three use Donald's magic to transform themselves and blend in with the inhabitants of each world.
2005	Sonic Rush	Dimps	A playable character, Blaze the Cat, and one of the game's antagonists, Eggman Nega, originate from an alternate world known as the Sol Dimension.
2012–present	Call of Duty: Black Ops series	Treyarch/Activision	The Zombies mode features various characters from alternate universes, as well as multiple maps taking place in said universes. The concept of alternate universes acts as a central plot point in both the ‘Aether’ and ‘Dark Aether’ sagas of the games.
2020	Hatsune Miku: Colorful Stage!	Colorful Palette/Sega	Characters within the game visit alternate dimensions made from their emotions, called Sekai, where alternate versions of Hatsune Miku and other virtual singers reside.
2021	Blue Archive	Nexon	Alternate universe versions of Sensei (the game's player character) and Shiroko appear as antagonists in "Volume Final".
