= The Terrornauts =

1967 British film by Montgomery Tully

- Theatrical release poster
- Directed by: Montgomery Tully
- Written by: John Brunner
- Based on: The Wailing Asteroid by Murray Leinster
- Produced by: Max Rosenberg; Milton Subotsky
- Starring: Simon Oates; Zena Marshall; Charles Hawtrey; Patricia Hayes
- Cinematography: Geoffrey Faithfull
- Edited by: Peter Musgrave
- Music by: Elisabeth Lutyens
- Production company: Amicus Productions
- Distributed by: Anglo Embassy
- Release dates: February 1967 (US); August 1971 (UK)
- Running time: 75 minutes
- Country: United Kingdom
- Language: English
- Budget: £85,332

The Terrornauts is a 1967 British science fiction film directed by Montgomery Tully and starring Simon Oates and Zena Marshall. It was produced by Amicus Productions and based on the 1960 novel The Wailing Asteroid by Murray Leinster, adapted for screen by John Brunner. Space scientists foil an alien invasion of Earth.

== Plot ==
Project Star Talk is based at a UK radio telescope site; its mission is to listen for radio signals from other intelligences. Dr Joe Burke leads the project, assisted by his small team as electronics expert Ben Keller and office manager Sandy Lund. Due to their lack of success, they are given ninety days to report positive results. While waiting for a response, Burke tells of his uncle's discovery at a French archaeological dig of a cube that gave him strange dreams as a boy, inspiring him to become an astronomer. During this period Joshua Yellowlees, an accountant, arrives to inspect the project's books.

As luck would have it, they receive a repeating signal, but it comes from an unpromising atmosphere-free small asteroid in the outer solar system. Nevertheless, Burke spends the balance of his grant to equip the telescope with a powerful transmitter to contact the source of the signals.

The night of the transmission, Yellowlees and Mrs Jones, who runs the tea trolley, stay to witness this historic event. The signal is sent and reaches the asteroid, on which is a huge installation that answers the radio signal with a spaceship sent riding down the radio beam to the point of transmission. When the spacecraft arrives at Project Star Talk, it picks up the transmitter shed and carries it and the project team to the alien installation.

On the asteroid, the team is greeted by a robot that takes them through a series of tests. After each test, they receive rewards, in particular a "Knowledge Cube" for the knowledge test.

Returning to the control room, Keller accidentally bumps Lund onto a "transposer platform" and she is matter-transported in a puff of smoke to a distant planet peopled by savages who try to kill her. Burke follows her to the planet, rescues her, and discovers the secret of the Knowledge Cubes. He plugs into the cube, and the horrible secret is revealed: the planet of savages is the home of the survivors of an interstellar war that is fast approaching Earth, and the Star Talk team are the only ones who can use the advanced weapons of the installation to stop the invading enemy fleet from destroying Earth. The team searches unsuccessfully through the huge library of cubes for the operating instructions of the fortress's weapons.

As the enemy fleet comes into range, the robot delivers the necessary cubes just in time. The battle is joined, but the Star Talk team fails to hit the aliens with missiles, so, with the cubes' instruction, the fortress's engines are started and they rise off the asteroid to intercept the aliens who crash into the fortress.

Burke sets the transposer for Earth and the team are matter-transported to the very archaeological dig where Dr Burke's uncle found the cube so long ago. While they congratulate themselves on their luck, a gendarme arrests them for trespassing.

== Cast ==
- Simon Oates as Dr. Joe Burke
- Zena Marshall as Sandy Lund
- Charles Hawtrey as Joshua Yellowlees
- Patricia Hayes as Mrs. Jones
- Stanley Meadows as Ben Keller
- Max Adrian as Dr. Henry Shore
- Frank Barry as Burke as a child
- Richard Carpenter as Danny
- Leonard Cracknell as Nick
- André Maranne as gendarme
- Frank Forsyth as uncle
- Robert Jewell as robot operator

== Release ==
Screened in the US in 1967, the film's UK release (in cut form) was not until 1971.

== Critical reception ==
The Terrornauts was distributed as a double feature with They Came from Beyond Space (1967). This double bill has been called "the two worst films the company ever produced".

In The Monthly Film Bulletin David McGillivray wrote: "Murray Leinster's novel has been simplified and adapted for juvenile audiences (hence the tea lady in outer space) in this long-delayed companion piece to They Came from Beyond Space . The inspiration for the treatment is clearly Dr. Who, but even on this modest level, children are unlikely to be much impressed by the slapdash effects, the jerry-built sets and, in particular, a silly robot (manned by Dalek operator Robert Jewell) which seems permanently on the verge of falling apart. The same goes for the comic relief which, although in the care of the old radio partnership of Charles Hawtrey and Patricia Hayes, sadly misfires."

Kine Weekly wrote: "An uncomplicated but quite ingenious bit of space adventure, this should please the undemanding."

Variety said: “John Brunner ... has fashioned a tight little sci-fi programmer that holds the interest. Director Montgomery Tully has wisely spiced the action with comedy, ably handled by veterans Charles Hawtrey as a prissy accountant and Patricia Hayes as a Cockney charwoman. ... The special effects are not elaborate but exceptionally well handled, especially a robot provided with its own personality. ... Tightly edited by Peter Musgrave, Terrornauts could hold its own on any sci-fi program."
