= Black Gate (magazine) =

American fantasy fiction magazine

- Black Gate, vol. 1, issue 2
- Categories: Fantasy
- Frequency: Quarterly
- Publisher: New Epoch Press
- Founded: 2000
- First issue: November 2000; 25 years ago
- Final issue: Ongoing (print version ended April 2011 with #15; Vol 3 No 3)
- Country: United States
- Based in: Chicago
- Website: www.blackgate.com

Black Gate is a fantasy magazine published by New Epoch Press. It was published in glossy print until 2011, after which it shifted online.

== History ==
First launched in October 2000 using the slogan "Adventures in Fantasy Literature," Black Gate primarily features original short fiction up to novella length. It also features reviews of fantasy novels, graphic novels, and role playing game products. This is supplemented by columns and articles reflecting on fantasy literature's past as well as the occasional interview. Every print issue contained the comic Knights of the Dinner Table: Java Joint by Kenzer & Company of Knights of the Dinner Table fame.

Much of the fiction is by lesser known or new authors, but noted contributors have included Michael Moorcock, Mike Resnick, Charles de Lint and Cory Doctorow. As a semi-regular feature, Black Gate reprinted rare adventure stories from earlier decades or work from more recent years that the editors feel has been neglected. For instance, issues featured serialized Tumithak novels from Charles R. Tanner.

While officially a quarterly publication, the print version was never produced on a reliable schedule. Its 15th and (to date) final issue was published in 2011; however, it continues to produce new online content.

== Critical response ==
On its debut, Black Gate received strong reviews in Locus and elsewhere, many citing the sheer size of the issues (usually greater than 200 pages) and the high production values. This has proved quite ambitious, though. Various production problems have led to publication less frequent than the intended quarterly schedule. While John O'Neill made a public commitment to readers and advertisers to get production back on track, the magazine never achieved a reliable quarterly release.

In 2008, Judith Berman's story "Awakening" in Black Gate No. 10 was a finalist for the Nebula Award.

== Editors ==
- John O'Neill, 2000 to present
- Howard Andrew Jones, 2006 to 2025
