= City on the Moon =

1957 novel by Murray Leinster

- First edition
- Author: Murray Leinster
- Cover artist: Ed Emshwiller
- Language: English
- Genre: Science fiction novel
- Publisher: Avalon Books
- Publication date: 1957
- Publication place: United States
- Media type: Print
- Pages: 224 pp
- OCLC: 1870677
- Preceded by: Space Platform, Space Tug.

City on the Moon is a science fiction novel by Murray Leinster. This story was first published by Avalon Books in 1957. City on the Moon forms part of the To the Stars series by the same author, with two preceding books being Space Platform and Space Tug. It was released in 1958 by Ace Books under authority from Thomas Bouregy & Co using their Ace Double imprint reference number D-277. The novel details the events that unfold subsequent to an apparent sabotage attempt made against a lunar jeep on its return journey to the multinational civilian lunar city.

== Plot introduction ==
Joe Kenmore is thrust into a hero role when an attempt to destroy the lunar jeep he and his co-pilot friend Moreau is thwarted through their speedy reaction. They rush their damaged jeep back to the civilian lunar base only to discover that an incoming rocket from Earth cannot obtain a landing beam to guide it in. The rocket has some surprise occupants and events start to escalate rapidly.

== Blurb ==
Further progress in atomic power could now come about only as a result of experiments so dangerous that they could only be carried on in an isolated space station hanging near the far side of the Moon. If these experiments succeeded, they could open the way to the stars.

In this scenario, the City on the Moon is responsible for providing the space laboratory. After colonist Joe Kenmore discovers that a conspiracy by secret agents to destroy the lunar base through nuclear means is planned, he tries to prevent it.
