= The Pirates of Zan =

1959 novel by Murray Leinster

- first edition cover
- Author: Murray Leinster
- Cover artist: Ed Emshwiller
- Language: English
- Genre: Science fiction novel
- Publisher: Ace Books
- Publication date: 1959
- Publication place: United States
- Media type: Print (Paperback)
- Pages: 163 pp
- OCLC: 52828831

The Pirates of Zan is a science fiction novel by Murray Leinster, originally serialized in Astounding Science Fiction in 1959 as "The Pirates of Ersatz". It was nominated for the 1960 Hugo Award for Best Novel. It first appeared in book form in 1959 as one component of an Ace Double, bound with Leinster's The Mutant Weapon; this edition was reissued in 1971. A German translation was issued in hardcover in 1962, an Italian translation appeared in 1968, and a Dutch translation was published in 1972. Bart Books published a stand-alone American paperback edition in 1989. and Baen Books included Pirates in a Leinster omnibus, A Logic Named Joe, in 2005.

== Summary ==
The Pirates of Zan tells the story of Bron Hoddan, a one-time engineer who sets out on a career of interstellar piracy ostensibly to further more legitimate goals.

== Reception ==
Frederik Pohl reviewed Pirates favorably, saying "It would not seem possible that after thirty years of space-pirate stories any writer could make one come alive; but Bron Hoddan is a rather unique space pirate, and Murray Leinster is a nearly unique science-fiction writer". P. Schuyler Miller praised the novel as "a rare old piece of Leinsterian adventure yarning". Amazing Stories reviewer S. E. Cotts was less enthusiastic, describing it as a "piece of lightweight science fiction, guaranteed for entertainment purposes only".

In The Encyclopedia of Science Fiction, John Clute describes Pirates as "a competent but unremarkable Space Opera".
