= The Men and the Mirror =

Science fiction short story

"The Men and the Mirror" is a short science fiction story by American writer Ross Rocklynne, published in Astounding Science Fiction in July 1938, since reprinted in Rocklynne's collection of the same title (1973) and in Isaac Asimov's anthology Before the Golden Age (1974). The story is one of three stories by Rocklynne featuring the protagonist Jack Colbie of the Interplanetary Police and his pursuit of interplanetary criminal Edward Deverel (all three are in his collection The Men and the Mirror).

== Plot summary ==
In the story, Colbie and Deverel inadvertently slip onto the nearly frictionless surface of an enormous concave mirror built by unknown alien beings on Cyclops, a rogue planet recently captured into an orbit around the Sun. The two must use the laws of physics to come up with a way to avoid oscillating in a pendulum motion back and forth across the mirror until eventually the small amount of friction brings them to a stop in the center.

Although the physics of the story can be criticized, the story is a textbook example of the kind of science-fiction called a "science puzzle" story (a variety of gedanken or 'idea' subgenre tale), in which the set up of the story is a puzzle which must be solved using (real) science. Later examples of this include Hal Clement's story "Dust Rag", and Larry Niven's "Neutron Star".

== Adaptations ==
Geoffrey A. Landis published a story in the January/February 2008 issue of Analog Science Fiction and Fact (formerly Astounding Science Fiction) called "The Man in the Mirror," which is also a science puzzle story about a frictionless concave mirror, only this time there is only one man, and the physics are more valid. The story was dedicated to Rocklynne.
