= Colonial Survey =

1957 collection of science fiction short stories by Murray Leinster

- Dust-jacket from the first edition
- Author: Murray Leinster
- Cover artist: Wallace Wood
- Language: English
- Genre: Science fiction
- Publisher: Gnome Press
- Publication date: 1957
- Publication place: United States
- Media type: Print (hardback)
- Pages: 185
- OCLC: 10703754

Colonial Survey is a 1957 fix-up novel combining four science fiction novelettes by American writer Murray Leinster. It was first published by Gnome Press in 1957 in an edition of 5,000 copies. The collection was reprinted by Avon Books in 1957 under the title The Planet Explorer. The novelettes all originally appeared in the magazine Astounding.

== Contents ==
- "Solar Constant", based on the 1956 novelette "Critical Difference"
- "Sand Doom", based on the eponymous 1956 novelette
- "Combat Team", based on the Hugo-award-winning 1956 novelette "Exploration Team"
- "The Swamp Was Upside Down", based on the eponymous 1956 novelette

== Reception ==
Galaxy reviewer Floyd C. Gale praised the collection as "the gadget story raised to new heights. . . . Leinster pulls his miracles out of a hat labeled Deus ex perspiration and makes them completely credible."

== Sources ==
- Chalker, Jack L.; Mark Owings (1998). The Science-Fantasy Publishers: A Bibliographic History, 1923-1998. Westminster, MD and Baltimore: Mirage Press, Ltd. p. 306.
- Contento, William G. "Index to Science Fiction Anthologies and Collections". Archived from the original on 2008-06-28.
