= Space Tug =

1953 novel by Murray Leinster

- Dust-jacket from the first edition
- Author: Murray Leinster
- Cover artist: Malcolm Smith
- Language: English
- Series: Joe Kenmore
- Genre: Young adult science fiction novel
- Publisher: Shasta Publishers
- Publication date: 1953
- Publication place: United States
- Media type: Print (Hardback)
- Pages: 223
- OCLC: 6570191
- Preceded by: Space Platform
- Followed by: City on the Moon

Space Tug is a young adult science fiction novel by American writer Murray Leinster. It was published in 1953 by Shasta Publishers in an edition of 5,000 copies. It is the second novel in the author's Joe Kenmore series.

== Plot introduction ==
The novel concerns the problems of the running of a space station.

== Reception ==
Groff Conklin gave it a mixed review in Galaxy, noting that it held "plenty of excitement though not much maturity." Boucher and McComas preferred it to the series's initial volume, but still found it "quite a notch below ... Leinster's adult work." P. Schuyler Miller reported the novel was marked by "the fastest kind of action" and "the feeling of technical authenticity."

== Sources ==
- Chalker, Jack L.; Mark Owings (1998). The Science-Fantasy Publishers: A Bibliographic History, 1923-1998. Westminster, MD and Baltimore: Mirage Press, Ltd. p. 594.
- Clute, John; Peter Nicholls (1995). The Encyclopedia of Science Fiction. New York: St. Martin's Griffin. p. 708. ISBN 0-312-13486-X.
- Tuck, Donald H. (1974). The Encyclopedia of Science Fiction and Fantasy. Chicago: Advent. p. 244. ISBN 0-911682-20-1.
