= The Abode of Life =

1982 Star Trek novel by G. Harry Stine

- Timescape cover
- Author: Lee Correy
- Language: English
- Series: Star Trek: The Original Series
- Genre: Science fiction novel
- Publisher: Pocket Books
- Publication date: 1 April 1982
- Publication place: United States
- Media type: Print (Paperback)
- Pages: 207 pp
- ISBN: 0-671-83297-2 (first edition, paperback)
- OCLC: 8468050
- LC Class: CPB Box no. 2968 vol. 7
- Preceded by: The Prometheus Design
- Followed by: Star Trek II: The Wrath of Khan

The Abode of Life is a Star Trek: The Original Series novel written by Lee Correy. "Lee Correy" was the pseudonym of G. Harry Stine, who was a science and technology writer as well as one of the founding figures of model rocketry.

== Plot ==
The citizens of the isolated planet Mercan cannot conceive of the existence of much past their home planet and their dangerous, flaring sun.

The USS Enterprise, severely damaged, must somehow find a way to repair itself without exposing the Mercanians to societal concepts for which they are not yet ready, as the Federation's 'Prime Directive' forbids interference in less advanced cultures.
