= Star Driver (novel) =

1980 science fiction novel by Lee Correy

First edition (publ. Del Rey Books) Cover art by Attila Hejja

Star Driver is a novel by Lee Correy published in 1980.

== Plot summary ==
Star Driver is a novel involving the development of a reactionless thruster.

== Reception ==
Greg Costikyan reviewed Star Driver in Ares Magazine #6 and commented that "Correy is a good storyteller, and if Star Driver is super science, it is good super science."

== Reviews ==
- Review by Dave Hutchinson [as by David Hutchinson] (1980) in Future Life, November 1980
- Review by Dean R. Lambe (1980) in Science Fiction Review, Winter 1980
- Review by Tom Easton (1981) in Analog Science Fiction/Science Fact, May 25, 1981
