= Exploration Team =

Novelette by Murray Leinster

- Novelette by Murray Leinster
- Cover art by Ed Emshwiller
- Illustrator: Ed Emshwiller
- Country: United States
- Language: English
- Genre: Science fiction novelette

Publication
- Published in: Astounding Science Fiction
- Publication type: Periodical
- Publisher: Street & Smith
- Media type: Print (Magazine)
- Publication date: March 1956
- Pages: 42
- Award: Hugo Award for Best Novelette (1956)

Chronology
- Series: Colonial Survey
"Sand Doom"	"Critical Difference"

"Exploration Team" is a science fiction novelette by American writer Murray Leinster, originally published in the March 1956 issue of Astounding Science Fiction. It won the Hugo Award for Best Novelette in 1956.

Writing in 1998, Gardner Dozois described "Exploration Team" as "taut, suspenseful and scary". He went on to note that it is "practically the model of how to write an intricate and intelligent adventure set on an alien world".

"Exploration Team" is one of the works in Leinster's "Colonial Survey" series. It is also one of the four novelettes that were re-written and included in Leinster's fix-up novel Colonial Survey, where it appears as a chapter titled "Combat Team".

== Plot summary ==
The novelette is set in a future time during which humanity has begun colonizing planets in other solar systems. The Colonial Survey agency has decreed the planet of Loren Two to be off-limits, due to the extremely dangerous native animals. Despite its decree, the Colonial Survey has authorized an experimental colony on the planet. At about the same time, the overcrowded inhabitants of another planet have established an unauthorized reconnaissance station on Loren Two. Neither group is aware of the other's existence. The authorized colony is well-funded, consisting of one dozen persons equipped with advanced robotic and other equipment. The unauthorized reconnaissance team consists of a single man, Huyghens, accompanied by an eagle and four specially-bred Kodiak bears. The bears have been "mutated" to have the psychological profile of dogs. They are friendly to humans and able to work in teams.

Huyghens receives a signal indicating that a ship is about to land near his station. he ship drops off its sole passenger, an officer with the Colonial Survey named Roane, and then departs. Roane soon learns that Huyghens is an illegal trespasser and that his signal beacon was not that of the authorized colony. For his part, Huyghens is surprised to learn that there is a colony. The two men wonder why the colony's signal beacon is not working and soon determine that it has been replaced by a low-technology emergency beacon. From this, the two men surmise that the colony has been overrun by the indigenous predators, but that some colonists might still be alive in the mine tunnels that the colony was expected to have dug.

Huyghens and Roane, along with the bears and the eagle, undertake a dangerous cross-country trek to determine the status of the colony.

== Publication history ==
Other than its original publication in the March 1956 issue of Astounding Science Fiction, "Exploration Team" did not see any other magazine publication until the May 1962 issue (No. 43) of the French-language magazine Satellite, as "Les meilleurs amis de l'homme" ("Man's Best Friends").

The story has been anthologized at least ten times, including thrice in Italian translation (one under the title "Colonia vietata" ("Illegal Colony")) and once in German. The story also appears in two collections devoted to Leinster's work—First Contacts (NESFA Press, 1998) and an Italian-language collection, the summer 1985 issue of Millemondi, as well as Volume 1 of The Hugo Winners series.

The foregoing was taken from the story's listing in the Internet Speculative Fiction Database (for which see the External links section below). More detail on its publication history can be found at that listing.

== Reception ==
Floyd C. Gale said in 1963 that the story was the best in The Hugo Winners Volume 1, praising Leinster for being able to adapt to changes in science fiction during a career of several decades.
