= Parallel universes in fiction =

Plot device in fiction

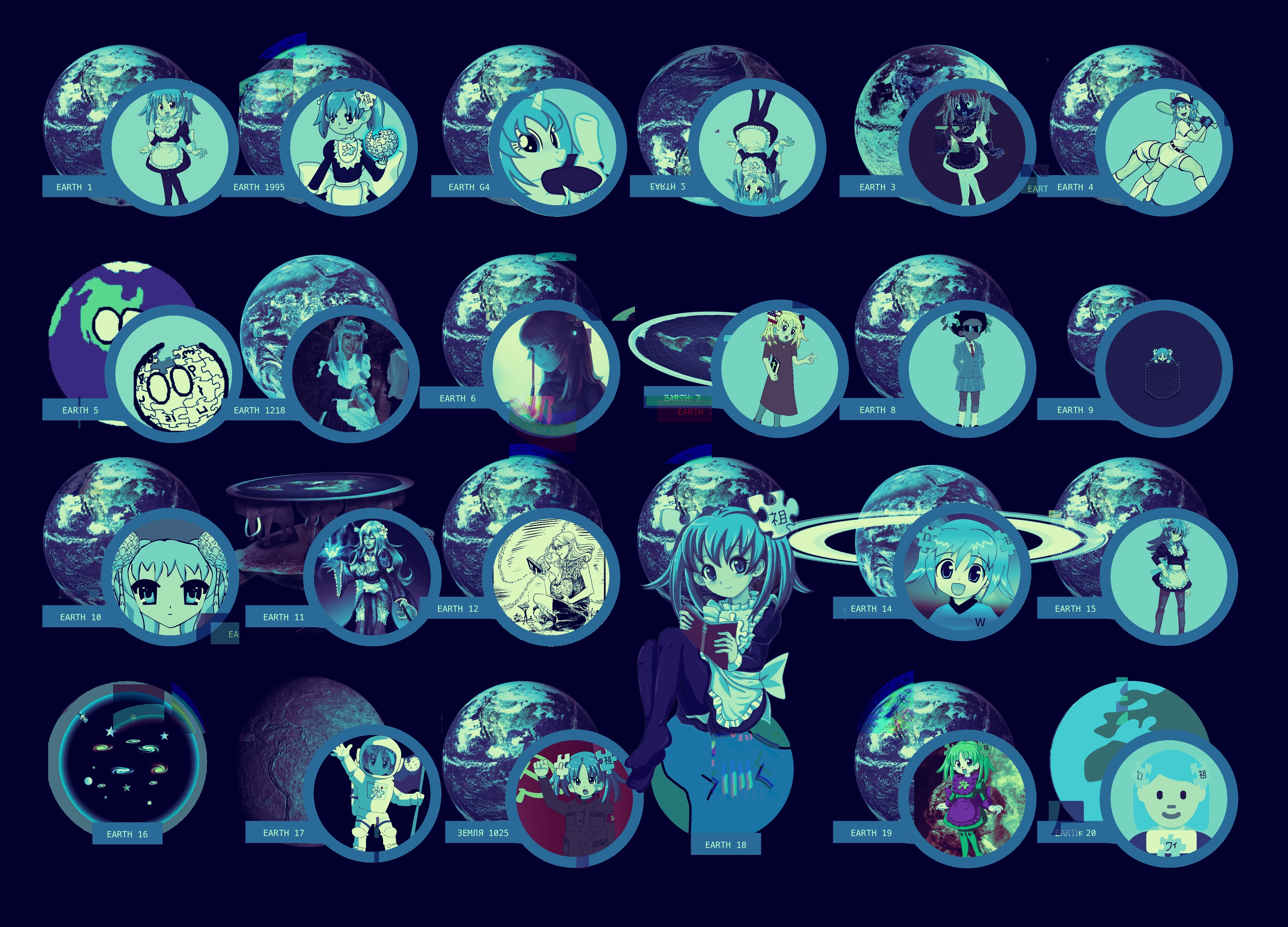
Stereotypical sci-fi multiverse inhabited by a multitude of Wikipe-tans

A parallel universe, also known as an alternate universe, world, or dimension, is a plot device in fiction which uses the notion of a hypothetical universe co-existing with another, typically to enable alternative narrative possibilities. The sum of all potential parallel universes that constitute reality is often called the "multiverse".

The device serves several narrative purposes. Among them, parallel universes have been used to allow stories with elements that would ordinarily violate the laws of nature, to enable characters to meet and interact with alternative versions of themselves or others from their home universe, thus enabling further character development, and to serve as a starting point for speculative fiction, particularly alternate history.

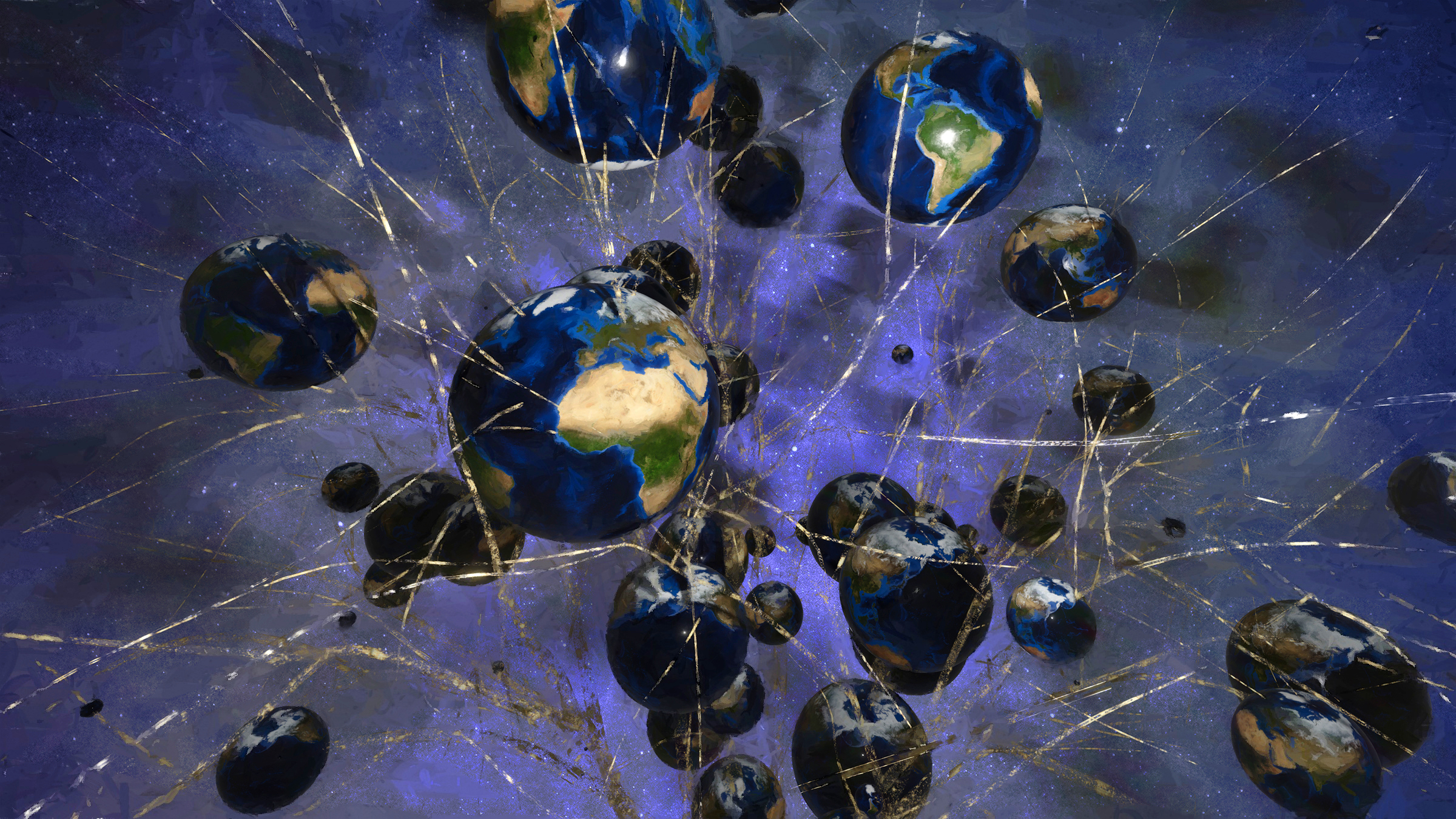
Artistic representation of the concept of parallel worlds

== History ==
=== Early examples ===
One of the first science-fiction examples of a parallel universe is Murray Leinster's short story Sidewise in Time, published in 1934. Although Leinster's story was not the first example of parallel universes, it is credited with popularizing the concept.

The use of parallel universes as a device in superhero fiction was popularized with the publication of the 123rd issue of The Flash, "Flash of Two Worlds", in 1961. In the issue, the Flashes of Earth-One and Earth-Two, Barry Allen and Jay Garrick, meet, establishing the concept of the DC Comics multiverse.

=== Recent examples ===
The multiverse has seen much usage in popular media in the late 2010s and early 2020s, particularly in superhero films, such as the Marvel Cinematic Universe (MCU) and the animated Spider-Verse franchise, as well as the 2022 film Everything Everywhere All at Once. Some filmmakers and critics, including MCU director Joe Russo, have expressed concern that film studios may be embracing multiverse-centric plotlines to capitalize on characters and intellectual property with pre-existing popularity, ultimately to the detriment of originality and creativity in filmmaking.

== Associated genres ==
=== Isekai ===
Isekai is a subgenre of Japanese fantasy light novels, manga, anime, and video games revolving around a normal person being transported to or trapped in a parallel universe. Often, this universe already exists in the protagonist's world as a fictional universe, but it may also be unbeknownst to them.

== Fan fiction ==
In fan fiction, parallel universes are commonly used as a setting for a story that departs from the canon of the fictional universe that the fan work is based on. Such works are usually referred to as "alternate universe" works, often abbreviated to "AU". Common motivations for writing such stories are to either explore alternative narrative possibilities not depicted in the original media, or to "fix" plot points which were disliked by the fandom. Examples include role-swaps (such as Swap, and Shift), tone shifts (such as Fell and Soft) and new setting AUs (such as Ocean or Outer).

== See also ==
- Alternate history
- List of fictional works featuring parallel universes
- The Long Earth (series)
