= Space Doctor =

1981 science fiction novel by G. Harry Stine as Lee Correy

Space Doctor is a medical science fiction novel by Lee Correy published in 1981.

== Plot summary ==
Space Doctor is a novel in which Dr. Tom Noels works as a medic as part of the construction of the first solar power satellite in space.

== Reception ==
Greg Costikyan reviewed Space Doctor in Ares magazine #10 and commented that "Space Doctor drags a bit, and the love interest uses one of the oldest tricks around, but on the whole it is an interesting novel, well worth reading – especially for those interested in near-future exploration of space."

== Reviews ==
- DeWeese, Gene (Winter 1981). "The Bloodshot Eye" (PDF). Science Fiction Review. Vol. 10, no. 4 (whole no. 41). p. 12. Archived (PDF) from the original on July 20, 2024.
