= Shuttle Down =

1981 techno-thriller novel by G. Harry Stine

- Author: G. Harry Stine
- Language: English
- Genre: Science Fiction, Thriller
- Publisher: Ballantine/Del Rey
- Publication date: 1981
- Publication place: United States
- Media type: Novel
- Pages: 216
- ISBN: 978-0-345-29262-9

Shuttle Down is a novel by American author G. Harry Stine, written under the pen name Lee Correy. First appearing as a four-part serial in Analog magazine between December 1980 and March 1981, the novel was later published by Ballantine/Del Rey in 1981, with a second edition following in 1985.

The book can best be described as an early form of the techno-thriller genre, later popularized by authors such as Tom Clancy.

== Plot summary ==
In the book, the Space Shuttle Atlantis launches on a polar orbit flight from Vandenberg Air Force Base in Southern California. During the launch, the main engines cut off prematurely and the Shuttle is forced to make an emergency landing on Easter Island.

Officials at NASA must manage the technological challenge of recovering the shuttle. Problems include a lack of documents for the astronauts and shuttle, bringing in the crane that is used to lift the Shuttle onto the specially-modified 747 that carries it, widening the runway to accommodate the 747, building turn-arounds on the runway, and bringing in fuel for the plane.

A subplot involves efforts by the Soviet Union to take the Shuttle for itself.
