= First Contact (novelette) =

- Short story by Murray Leinster
- Country: United States
- Language: English
- Genre: Science fiction

Publication
- Publisher: Astounding Science Fiction
- Publication date: May 1945

"First Contact" is a 1945 science fiction novelette by American writer Murray Leinster, credited as one of the first (if not the first) instances of a universal translator in science fiction. It won a retro Hugo Award for Best Novelette in 1996.

Two species make first contact in deep space. Each desires the technology and trade the other can provide, but neither is willing to risk leading the other back to their home planet.

It was among the stories selected in 1970 by the Science Fiction Writers of America as one of the best science fiction short stories published before the creation of the Nebula Awards. As such, it was published in The Science Fiction Hall of Fame Volume One, 1929-1964.

== Plot ==
Space travel is routine between planets in the Solar System. Ships function very much like naval warships or research vessels. There are technologies such as "overdrive" which allows a ship to travel much faster than light in normal space and apparently artificial gravity within a ship. Atomic power is used everywhere, even in a space suit propulsion unit. Ships are equipped with "blasters" not necessarily for use as weapons but for destroying space debris which would otherwise collide with the ship.

The exploration ship Llanvabon is approaching the Crab Nebula when it suddenly detects another ship on its radar. The two ships' radars are, in fact, interfering with each other and so each sees a wildly-distorted image of the other ship. Even after the problem is resolved and the two crews, one human, one alien, establish communication, both realize that they have a problem. Neither can leave without ensuring that the other cannot track them to their home planet.

The aliens are humanoid bipeds but see in the infrared portion of the spectrum. Also, instead of using sound to communicate among themselves, they use microwaves emitted from an organ in their heads. As one human points out, "From our point of view, they have telepathy. Of course from their point of view, so do we."

The crews discover that they have much in common. This is especially true of young Tommy Dort and his counterpart on the other ship, to whom he has assigned the name Buck. Although they can communicate only through an artificial code, they establish a rapport. However, Buck is pessimistic about the eventual outcome. He sends Tommy a message, "You are a good guy. Too bad we must kill each other."

The deadlock persists. Neither ship dares to leave for fear that the other will be able to track it home. Neither captain is ready to gamble by attacking the other ship. Then, Tommy realizes the way out of the impasse. He and his captain arrange an exchange of personnel between the ships. Tommy and the captain go aboard the alien ship even as two aliens board the Llanvabon. Then they present an ultimatum: they will detonate the atomic power packs in their suits if the aliens refuse to go along with their plan, which is for each crew to take the other's ship back to their home planet. Each will disable all the tracking equipment on their own ship before the exchange, and indeed, they will have to be thorough to prevent the new crew from tracking them.

At this point, the aliens begin behaving very strangely, twitching or lying down and kicking the floor. In fact, it is their equivalent of laughter. Their own people have just given the humans the same ultimatum, and the same plan.

The story ends with each crew taking over the other's ship. Naturally, before leaving their own ship, they remove everything that might point back to their home world. Each stands to benefit from the new technology on the other's ship. Each keeps the other race's fiction library to gain insight into their thinking. They agree to repeat the encounter at the same location sometime in the future.

Tommy is confident that the two races will get along. He believes this because, as he tells the captain, he and Buck spent a good deal of time swapping dirty jokes.

== Radio plays ==
This story was performed as a radio play on Dimension X on September 8, 1951 and on X Minus One on October 6, 1955, condensed somewhat and with a different ending.

The story was also performed on Exploring Tomorrow on January 15, 1958.

== Style ==
The style and the language of First Contact have been seen as illustrative of the Golden Age of science fiction.

== Legal action against Paramount Pictures ==
In 2000, Leinster's heirs sued Paramount Pictures over the film Star Trek: First Contact and claimed that as the owners of the rights to Leinster's short story "First Contact", it infringed their trademark in the term. The U.S. District Court for the Eastern District of Virginia granted Paramount's motion for summary judgment and dismissed the suit. The court found that regardless of whether Leinster's story first coined the phrase, it had since become a generic and therefore an unprotectable term that described the genre of science fiction in which humans first encounter alien species. Even if the title was instead "descriptive," a category of terms higher than "generic" that may be protectable, there was no evidence that the title had the required association in the public's mind (known as "secondary meaning") such that its use would normally be understood as referring to Leinster's story.
