= Four from Planet 5 =

1959 novel by Murray Leinster

- Author: Murray Leinster
- Cover artist: Paul Lehr
- Language: English
- Genre: Science fiction novel
- Publisher: Gold Medal Books
- Publication date: 1959
- Publication place: United States
- Media type: Print (Paperback)
- Pages: 160 pp
- OCLC: 2205587

Four from Planet 5 is a science fiction novel by Murray Leinster. It was released in 1959 by Fawcett Publications under their Gold Medal Books imprint reference number S937. The novel details the arrival of a spaceship carrying four seemingly human children from an advanced civilisation close to a US scientific research base in Antarctica and the events that subsequently unfold. This story appeared in the September 1959 edition of Amazing Science Fiction under the title Long Ago Far Away.

== Plot introduction ==
Soames is an underpaid researcher based at the Gissel Bay research station in Antarctica and is secretly in love with a visiting reporter, Gail Haynes. They and US W.A.C. Captain Moggs set out to investigate the arrival and crash landing of what appears to be a spaceship. Events soon unfold as the US government's attempts to hush up the alien landing are frustrated by the press.
