= Out of This World (Leinster book) =

1958 collection of stories by Murray Leinster

- First edition dust jacket
- Author: Murray Leinster
- Cover artist: Ric Binkley
- Language: English
- Genre: Science fiction
- Publisher: Avalon Books
- Publication date: 1958
- Publication place: United States
- Media type: Print
- Pages: 221

Out of This World is a collection of three related science fiction stories by Murray Leinster, published by Avalon Books in 1958. The stories, all featuring "hillbilly polymath" Bud Gregory, originally appeared in Thrilling Wonder Stories over a four-month span in 1947, and are sometimes characterized as a novel. A fourth story in the Gregory sequence, "The Seven Temporary Moons", was published in TWS in 1948, but has never been collected. All the stories originally carried the "William Fitzgerald" byline (a derivative of Leinster's birthname, William Fitzgerald Jenkins).

== Contents ==
- "The Deadly Dust" (as William Fitzgerald), Thrilling Wonder, August 1947
- "The Gregory Circle" (as William Fitzgerald), Thrilling Wonder, April 1947
- "The Nameless Something" (as William Fitzgerald), Thrilling Wonder, June 1947

== Reception ==
Damon Knight noted that "Leinster is ingenious in thinking up zany practical applications of slightly cockeyed principles," but concluded that "watching Gregory pull these things out of his hat one after another is wearisome; unlimited fantasy... is generally boring." Floyd C. Gale called the book "a rampant spoof... staying just this side of slapstick. Nevertheless, it emerges more heavy-handed than most of his lighter works".
