= Miners in the Sky =

1967 novel by Murray Leinster

Miners in The Sky
- First edition (publ. Avon); Cover art by Paul Lehr
- Author: Murray Leinster
- Language: English
- Publisher: Avon
- Publication date: 1967

Miners in The Sky is a 1967 science fiction novel by American writer Murray Leinster, published by Avon.

== Plot summary ==
The rings around Thotmess, a gas giant in the system of the star Niletus where planets are called for Ancient Egyptian gods, is a completely lawless place. The only human inhabitants are rugged miners, riding small "donkey ships", who need to contend with both the harsh natural environment and fierce human competitors. "Claim jumping" is frequent, and miners must be ready at any moment to take up a gun or a bazooka to defend their finds of "grey matrix in which abyssal crystals occur".
