= Return to the Lost Planet =

1954 novel by Angus MacVicar

- First edition
- Author: Angus MacVicar
- Language: English
- Genre: Science fiction
- Published: 1954
- Publisher: Burke Publishing Co.
- Publication place: United Kingdom
- Media type: Print (hardback)
- Preceded by: The Lost Planet
- Followed by: Secret of the Lost Planet

Return to the Lost Planet is a 1954 juvenile science fiction novel by Angus MacVicar, published by Burke, London. It is the second of the Lost Planet series, which was created for radio and later adapted for prose and television.

There are six novels in the Lost Planet series: The Lost Planet (1953), Return to the Lost Planet (1954), Secret of the Lost Planet (1955), Red Fire on the Lost Planet (1959), Peril on the Lost Planet (1960) and Space Agent from the Lost Planet.

It was the first science fiction series ever translated into Hebrew and had considerable impact on the development of this genre in Israel.

== Plot summary ==
The plot follows on precisely from The Lost Planet.

A previous expedition to Hesikos, the wandering 'lost planet' which is now within a few days flight of Earth, has crash-landed, and Dr Lachlan McKinnon (its organiser), Professor Hermanoff and American engineer Spike Stranahan are marooned. McKinnon's colleagues must build and launch a spaceship from their Scottish base to travel to Hesikos, but to construct the ship they must obtain the expert assistance of Dr Andrieff, a scientist and engineer, who risks exile from his Eastern European country by so doing.

The crew, consisting of McKinnon's nephew Jeremy Grant, Professor Lars Bergman, science student Janet Campbell and Cockney housekeeper Madge, rescue the three explorers, who have survived the harsh winter, and start to explore the planet in a Jeep. They find signs that Hesikos was once inhabited, and that atomic bombs were detonated long ago on the surface. Escaping from a deluge of water, which damages their Jeep, as a river suddenly rises, they take refuge in a cave, which leads to a door. The door opens to admit them to caverns where the inhabitants of the planet now live.

The people are highly intelligent and human-like, communicating with the visitors by telepathy, which is facilitated by a machine called the Electronome. They explain that since their planet's orbit was destroyed eons ago by atomic experiments, they have lived a peaceful underground existence, only emerging in the mild summer season to gather fruits and plants. Their current leader is Solveg, with his daughter Asa.

Power for the colony is supplied by hydroelectric generators, but when a rockfall blocks the underground river, all power is lost. The inhabitants have a fatalistic philosophy that allows them to face inevitable destruction stoically, but McKinnon cannot accept this. Grant and Stranahan use the explosives they have saved from the flood to clear the blockage — and Hesikos is saved.

The visitors' then return to their spaceship in the Jeep which the Hesikans have repaired, and return to Earth accompanied by Asa, who hopes to spread her philosophy of peace.
