= Operation: Outer Space =

1954 novel by Murray Leinster

- Dust-jacket from the first edition
- Author: Murray Leinster
- Cover artist: John T. Brooks
- Language: English
- Genre: Science fiction
- Publisher: Fantasy Press
- Publication date: 1954
- Publication place: United States
- Media type: Print (Hardback)
- Pages: 208
- OCLC: 1561287

Operation: Outer Space is a science fiction novel by American writer Murray Leinster. It was first published in 1954 by Fantasy Press.

== Premise ==
The novel concerns the first interstellar flight, financed by making it into a television show.

== Reception ==
Galaxy reviewer Groff Conklin praised the novel as "a fast-paced, sardonic job that is primarily a satire on the future of mass communications." Anthony Boucher similarly praised the novel's satirical elements, although he found that "a slight lack of genuine bite and emotion" kept the novel "from being a front-ranker." P. Schuyler Miller reported that "It's no classic, but it's good reading."

== Sources ==
- Chalker, Jack L.; Mark Owings (1998). The Science-Fantasy Publishers: A Bibliographic History, 1923-1998. Westminster, Maryland and Baltimore: Mirage Press, Ltd. p. 240.
- Clute, John; Peter Nicholls (1995). The Encyclopedia of Science Fiction. New York: St. Martin's Griffin. p. 708. ISBN 0-312-13486-X.
- Tuck, Donald H. (1974). The Encyclopedia of Science Fiction and Fantasy. Chicago: Advent. p. 243. ISBN 0-911682-20-1.
