= G. Harry Stine =

American writer and engineer (1928–1997)

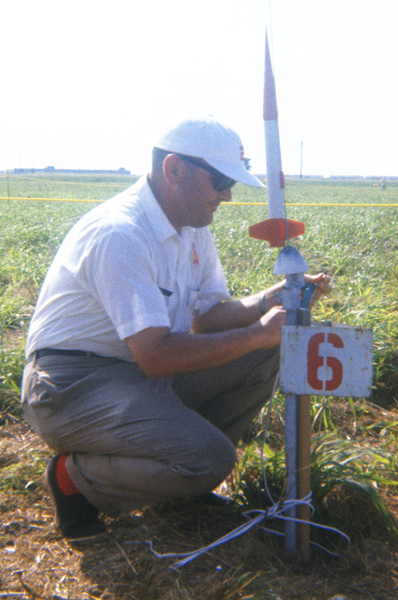
- G. Harry Stine preparing a model rocket for launch at NARAM-12, Houston, TX, 1970
- Born: March 26, 1928
- Died: November 2, 1997 (aged 69)
- Other name: Lee Correy
- Known for: Model rocketry, science fiction

George Harry Stine (March 26, 1928 – November 2, 1997) was one of the founding figures of model rocketry, a science and technology writer, and (under the name Lee Correy) a science fiction author.

== Education and early career ==
Stine grew up in Colorado Springs and attended New Mexico Military Institute and Colorado College in Colorado Springs, majoring in physics. Upon his graduation he went to work at White Sands Proving Grounds, first as a civilian scientist and then, from 1955 to 1957, at the U.S. Naval Ordnance Missile Test Facility as head of the Range Operations Division.

Stine and his wife Barbara were friends of author Robert A. Heinlein, who sponsored their wedding, as Harry's parents were dead and Barbara's mother too ill to travel. Several of Heinlein's books are dedicated to one or both of them, most particularly Have Space Suit—Will Travel. Stine wrote science fiction under the pen name "Lee Correy" in the mid-1950s and under his own name in the 1980s and 1990s, as well as writing science articles for Popular Mechanics.

After White Sands, Stine was employed at several other aerospace companies, finally ending up at Martin working on the Titan project. This job was short-lived: he was abruptly fired in 1957 when United Press called him for a reaction to the launch of Sputnik 1, and he repeated to them a passage from his just-published book Earth Satellites and the Race for Space Superiority, in which he wrote, "For the first time since the dawn of history, the Earth is going to have more than one moon. This is due to happen within the next few months—or it may have already happened even at the time you are reading this." The next day he was told to clear out his desk. In his "The Formative Years of Model Rocketry, 1957–1962; A Personal Memoir" (International Astronautical Federation, IAF XXVIIth Congress, Anaheim, CA, October 10–16, 1976 (76-241), he wrote "I was fired by the Martin Company on October 5, 1957, for telling United Press that the Soviets had used their ICBM as a launch vehicle (which they had), that Sputnik meant that the entire United States was open to nuclear ICBM attack (which it still is), and that the United States was not first in space because we did not have a serious space program (which we did not under the Eisenhower administration)."

== Model rocketry ==
Back in his days at White Sands he had handled inquiries from young people concerning rockets, and early in 1957 he wrote an article for Mechanics Illustrated about rocket safety. Shortly thereafter he received a letter from Orville Carlisle, who had begun making small models and, more importantly, replaceable solid fuel engines to power them. Stine was impressed with the samples that Carlisle had sent him, and wrote a cover article for the October MI issue about them. After the Martin firing, he contacted Carlisle and the two of them formed Model Missiles Inc., the first manufacturer of model rockets and their engines. Stine also founded the National Association of Rocketry (initially called the Model Missile Association) and wrote the safety code which became its centerpiece; he served as its president until the late 1960s.

MMI was short-lived, as they were unprepared to handle the level of business they attracted and because of some poor business decisions. Issues with the production of early engines caused them to seek out Vernon Estes, who came to them in the summer of 1958. Estes's design and construction of "Mabel", the first engine-manufacturing machine, was the foundation of his success and put Estes Industries in a dominant position in the hobby which it was never to relinquish.

Stine continued to work to popularize the hobby, writing the Handbook of Model Rocketry in 1965, which went on through seven editions over the years. He returned to the aerospace industry, continuing to write under his pen name, including a Star Trek novel called The Abode of Life and the original novel Shuttle Down. Under his own name, he was a regular science-fact columnist for Astounding and its later successor Analog. He was a consultant to CBS News during the Apollo program, along with Lindy Davis, Charles Friedlander and Richard C. Hoagland. Stine would also occasionally advise Rick Sternbach and Mike Okuda in their work for Star Trek: The Next Generation as technical artists and advisors, and was credited in Star Trek: The Next Generation Technical Manual for that assistance. The character named "Harry Stein" in the novel Stardance (by Spider Robinson and Jeanne Robinson) is a homage to Stine.

== Other work ==
Stine was very interested in the interaction of volunteer/free market Libertarian ideas with space colonization and as a tool of citizen diplomacy and world peace, and so was called to serve as chair of the advisory board of the Libertarian International Organization where he mentored various citizen initiatives until his death. In the wake of his book, The Third Industrial Revolution, he was asked to co-organize the American Astronautical Society 1977 conference on private space colonization to re-channel focus away from space exploration alone, and where he received an award as a founder of the international space effort. He was interested in the concept of non-immediate profit-driven free markets, and was seen as a developer and defender of the "pay it forward" approach with Robert A. Heinlein, a term also popularized in a movie of that name, starring Kevin Spacey and other stars. In addition to The Third Industrial Revolution, he wrote several other books encouraging public awareness of the possibilities of a lucrative and socially beneficial active space industry.

Stine was a founding member of the Citizens' Advisory Council on National Space Policy and attended several meetings including the 1980 meeting that prepared the space defense policy papers for the Reagan Transition Team.

Stine was active in the development of fire safety standards dealing with model rocketry and pyrotechnics. He served on the National Fire Protection Association's (NFPA) Technical Committee on Pyrotechnics, representing the National Association of Rocketry, being first appointed in 1967 and then appointed as committee chair in February 1974. This technical committee was responsible for drafting the Association's Code for Model Rocketry, NFPA 41L, which is now known as NFPA 1122, Code for Unmanned Rockets. He chaired the committee until January 1994 and received the Association's Committee Service Award in 1993.

He died on November 2, 1997, in Phoenix, Arizona, of an apparent stroke.

== Bibliography ==
=== Science fiction ===
Hardback, as Lee Correy

- Starship Through Space, Henry Holt, 1954
- Rocket Man, Henry Holt, 1955

Paperback, as Lee Correy

- Contraband Rocket, Ace Double, 1955, ISBN 978-0-441-04146-6
- Star Driver, Del Rey, July 1980
- Shuttle Down, Del Rey, April 1981
- Space Doctor, Del Rey, June 1981
- The Abode of Life, Pocket Science Fiction, May 1982
- Manna, DAW Science Fiction, January 1984
- A Matter of Metalaw, DAW Science Fiction, October 1986

Paperback, as G. Harry Stine

- G. Harry Stine (1980). "The Day the Sky Burned". Destinies. Vol. 2, no. 4 – via the Internet Archive.
- Warbots, Pinnacle Science Fiction, May 1988, ISBN 1-55817-111-8
- Warbots #2: Operation Steel Band, Pinnacle Science Fiction, July 1988, ISBN 1-55817-061-8
- Warbots #3: The Bastaard Rebellion, Pinnacle Science Fiction, September 1988, ISBN 1-55817-089-8
- Warbots #4: Sierra Madre, Pinnacle Science Fiction, November 1988, ISBN 1-55817-132-0
- Warbots #5: Operation High Dragon, Pinnacle Science Fiction, January 1989, ISBN 1-55817-159-2
- Warbots #6: The Lost Battalion, Pinnacle Science Fiction, April 1989, ISBN 1-55817-205-X
- Warbots #7: Operation Iron Fist, Pinnacle Science Fiction, August 1990, ISBN 1-55817-253-X
- Warbots #8: Force of Arms, Pinnacle Science Fiction, March 1990, ISBN 1-55817-324-2
- Warbots #9: Blood Siege, Pinnacle Science Fiction, September 1990, ISBN 1-55817-402-8
- Warbots #10: Guts and Glory, Pinnacle Science Fiction, June 1991, ISBN 1-55817-453-2
- Warbots #11: Warrior Shield, Pinnacle Science Fiction, February 1992, ISBN 1-55817-589-X
- Warbots #12: Judgement Day, Pinnacle Science Fiction, September 1992, ISBN 1-55817-642-X
- Starsea Invaders: First Action, New American Library, August 1993
- Starsea Invaders: Second Contact, New American Library, March 1994
- Starsea Invaders: Third Encounter, New American Library, May 1995
- Open Space (graphic novel, 1989)

=== Non-fiction ===
- Earth Satellites and the Race for Space Superiority, 1957
- Rocket Power and Space Flight, Henry Holt & Co., 1957
- Man and the Space Frontier, 1962
- The Third Industrial Revolution, Putnam, 1975, ISBN 0-399-11552-8
- Shuttle into Space: A Ride in America's Space Transportation, 1978
- The Third Industrial Revolution, Ace Science Fiction, May 1979, ISBN 0-441-80664-3
- The Space Enterprise, Ace Science, August 1980, ISBN 0-441-77756-2
- Confrontation in Space, Prentice-Hall, 1981
- Space Power, Ace Science, September 1981, ISBN 0-441-77744-9
- The Space Enterprise, 1982
- The Hopeful Future, MacMillan, 1983, ISBN 0-02-614790-4
- The Silicon Gods, Dell, October, ISBN 0-440-08048-7, 1984
- The Untold Story of The Computer Revolution, Arbor House, 1984, ISBN 0-87795-574-3
- Frontiers of Science: Strange Machines You Can Build, Atheneum, 1985, ISBN 0-689-11562-8
- Handbook for Space Colonists, Henry Holt & Co., 1985, ISBN 0-03-070741-2
- On the Frontiers of Science, Atheneum, 1985, ISBN 0-689-11562-8
- The Corporate Survivors, Amacom Books, 1986, ISBN 0-8144-5831-9
- ICBM: The Making of the Weapon That Changed the World, Crown, 1991, ISBN 0-517-56768-7
- Mind Machines You Can Build, Top Of The Mountain Publishing, 1992, ISBN 1-56087-075-3
- Halfway to Anywhere, M. Evans and Company, N.Y., 1996, ISBN 0-87131-805-9
- Living in Space, M. Evans & Co., 1997, ISBN 0-87131-841-5
- The Manna Project: Business Opportunities in Outer Space, 1998

==== Model rocketry ====
- The Handbook of Model Rocketry 1st ed., Follet Publishing, 1965
- The Handbook of Model Rocketry 2nd ed., Follet Publishing, 1967
- The Handbook of Model Rocketry 3rd ed., Follet Publishing, 1970
- The Handbook of Model Rocketry 4th ed., Follet Publishing, 1976, ISBN 0-695-80616-5
- The Handbook of Model Rocketry 5th ed., 1985, ISBN 0-668-05360-7
- The Handbook of Model Rocketry 6th ed., John Wiley & Sons, 1994, ISBN 0-471-59361-3
- The Handbook of Model Rocketry 7th ed., with Bill Stine, Wiley, 2004, ISBN 0-471-47242-5
- The Model Rocketry Manual, 1969
- The New Model Rocketry Manual, Arco Publishing, 1977
- The New Model Rocketry Handbook, Arco Publishing, 1977, ISBN 0-668-04282-6 (paper edition)
- The New Model Rocketry Handbook, Arco Publishing, 1977, ISBN 0-668-04030-0 (library edition)
