= The Forgotten Planet =

1954 novel by Murray Leinster

- Dust-jacket from the first edition
- Author: Murray Leinster
- Cover artist: Ed Emshwiller
- Language: English
- Genre: Science fiction
- Publisher: Gnome Press
- Publication date: 1954
- Publication place: United States
- Media type: Print (hardback)
- Pages: 177
- OCLC: 1813386

The Forgotten Planet is a science fiction novel by American writer Murray Leinster. It was released in 1954 by Gnome Press in an edition of 5,000 copies. The novel is a fix-up from three short stories, "The Mad Planet" and "The Red Dust", both of which had originally appeared in the magazine Argosy in 1920 and 1921, and "Nightmare Planet", which had been published in Science Fiction Plus in 1953.

== Plot introduction ==
A planet had been seeded for life by humans, first with microbes and later with plants and insects. A third expedition, intended to complete the seeding with animals, never occurred. (This represents a retcon introduced in "Nightmare Planet.") Over the millennia the insects and plants grew to gigantic sizes. The action of the novel describes the fight for survival by descendants of a crashed spaceship as they battle wolf-sized ants, flies the size of chickens, and gigantic flying wasps.

== Reception ==
Groff Conklin of Galaxy Science Fiction praised the novel as "Leinster at his exciting, skilled best," declaring "there is almost nothing in the story that is not first-rate." The magazine's Floyd C. Gale called it "quite a reading experience". P. Schuyler Miller similarly reported "the old master is at his best in this one." Anthony Boucher, however, found it to be "an interminable sequence of wars against giant insects, which seems pretty outmoded today."

== Sources ==
- Chalker, Jack L.; Mark Owings (1998). The Science-Fantasy Publishers: A Bibliographic History, 1923-1998. Westminster, Maryland and Baltimore: Mirage Press, Ltd. p. 303.
- Contento, William G. "Index to Science Fiction Anthologies and Collections". Archived from the original on June 28, 2008.
- Tuck, Donald H. (1974). The Encyclopedia of Science Fiction and Fantasy. Chicago: Advent. pp. 242–243. ISBN 0-911682-20-1.
