= The Lost Planet (novel) =

1953 novel by Angus MacVicar

- First edition cover
- Author: Angus MacVicar
- Language: English
- Genre: Science fiction
- Published: 1953
- Publisher: Burke Publishing Co.
- Publication place: United Kingdom
- Media type: Print (hardback)
- Pages: 186 pp
- Followed by: Return to the Lost Planet

The Lost Planet is a 1953 juvenile science fiction novelisation by Angus MacVicar, published by Burke, London. It is the first of the popular novel series The Lost Planet, which had originally been written for radio (1952 Childrens Hour, BBC Home Service) and was later adapted for television

There are six novels in the main series: The Lost Planet (1953), Return to the Lost Planet (1954), Secret of the Lost Planet (1955), Red Fire on the Lost Planet (1959), Peril on the Lost Planet (1960) and Space Agent from the Lost Planet. Two further books continue the adventures of the Space Agent: Space Agent and the Isles of Fire (1962), and Space Agent and the Ancient Peril (1964). It was the first science fiction series ever translated to Hebrew and had considerable impact on the development of this genre in Israel.

== Plot summary ==
The narrator, 16-year-old Jeremy Grant, who has been recently orphaned, travels from Australia to Scotland to stay with his scientist uncle, Dr Lachlan McKinnon, at his estate, Inverard. He discovers that the irascible McKinnon and his colleagues, including Swedish Professor Lars Bergman, American engineer Spike Stranahan, science student Janet Campbell, Cockney housekeeper Madge Smith and engineer Kurt Oppenheim, are building an atomic-powered spaceship to travel to Hesikos, the wandering 'lost planet' which is now within a few days' flight of Earth, and which is known to have near-Earth gravity and a breathable atmosphere.

It transpires that Oppenheim is a spy and saboteur working for a rival expedition, led by Professor Hermanoff, from an Eastern European country. Oppenheim is dismissed, and later Hermanoff visits Inverard to try to persuade the two expeditions to join forces, but there is too much suspicion and animosity. Oppenheim's place is taken by Grant.

Their take-off and voyage are trouble-free, but a mechanical fault causes a crash-landing on Hesikos, damaging the radio, and making it almost certain that the ship cannot take off again. Nevertheless, the crew start to explore the area, finding an atmosphere of peace which calms their anxieties and tempers. They gradually realise that much of the planet is covered by deep snow and ice in the winter, making all but plant life impossible and their own survival unlikely.

On one trip they encounter Hermanoff and his assistant, Andrieff, whose spaceship has landed a few miles away. Hermanoff's personality has also mellowed, and he immediately offers to take McKinnon and his colleagues back to Earth before the imminent onset of winter. McKinnon is worried about overloading the spaceship, and at the last minute, unbeknown to the rest, he leaves the ship to return to his own, hoping to survive the cold until a relief expedition can be organised.

Safely back on Earth, Grant and Campbell pick up a Morse code radio message from Hesikos confirming that McKinnon is alive. Within a few days Hermanoff and Stranahan have taken off to rescue him. The sequel Return to the Lost Planet continues from this point.
