= Sidewise in Time =

1934 short story by Murray Leinster

- Short story by Murray Leinster
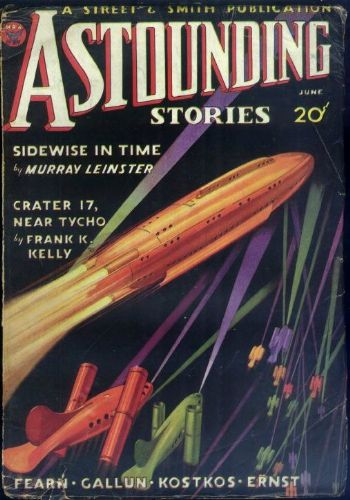
- Country: United States
- Language: English
- Genre: Science fiction

Publication
- Published in: Astounding Stories
- Publisher: Street & Smith
- Media type: Print (Magazine, hardback & paperback)
- Publication date: June 1934

"Sidewise in Time" is a science fiction short story by American writer Murray Leinster (1896-1975) first published in the June 1934 issue of Astounding Stories. It is regarded as the first example of the alternate history genre of science fiction in which one or more historical events happened differently than they did in our own historical reality. The Sidewise Award for Alternate History, established in 1995 to recognize the best alternate history stories and novels of the year, was named in honor of this work.

"Sidewise in Time" also served as the title story for Leinster's second story collection in 1950.

== Plot summary ==
Professor Minott is a mathematician at Robinson College in Fredericksburg, Virginia who has determined that an apocalyptic cataclysm is fast approaching that could destroy the entire universe. The cataclysm manifests itself on June 5, 1935 (one year in the future of the story's original publication) when sections of the Earth's surface begin changing places with their counterparts in alternate timelines. A Roman legion from a timeline where the Roman Empire never fell appears on the outskirts of St. Louis, Missouri. Viking longships from a timeline where the Vikings settled North America raid a seaport in Massachusetts. A traveling salesman from Louisville, Kentucky, whose van bears a commercial logo including Uncle Sam with the Stars and Stripes, finds himself in trouble with the law when he travels into an area where the South won the American Civil War. A ferry approaching San Francisco finds the flag of Tsarist Russia flying from a grim fortress dominating the city.

When a forest of sequoias appears north of Fredericksburg, Professor Minott leads an expedition of seven students from Robinson College to explore it. They reach the Potomac River, and find on its banks a Chinese village surrounded by rice paddies. At this point, Minott reveals the true situation to the students: he knew in advance that the timeline exchanges were going to take place, and he intends to lead the students to a timeline where he can use his scientific knowledge to gain wealth and power. The party returns to Fredericksburg, which in their absence has been replaced by wilderness, and Minott informs the students that they cannot return to their original timeline.

That night, an airplane from their own timeline makes a crash landing near Minott's party. Before the pilot dies, they learn from him that Washington, D.C. from their timeline was still in place. A student named Blake wants to make for Washington, but Minott refuses. The forest catches fire from the burning airplane, and the party flees to a Roman villa. They are captured by the villa's owner, except for Blake, who escapes. Later that night Blake secretly returns to the villa and frees the others from the slave pen, shooting the owner in the process. The next morning, the party finds itself near a section of their own timeline. Blake leads the other students there, but Minott refuses to come; he still intends to travel to a more primitive timeline and make himself its ruler. One of the women in the party joins him, while the rest of the students return to their timeline.

The students are able to contact the rest of the world and inform them of Minott's deductions about the event. Within two weeks, the timeline exchanges trail off, leaving bits and pieces of other timelines embedded in our own.

== Influence ==
"Sidewise in Time" was among the first science fiction stories about parallel universes. In 1903 H. G. Wells wrote "A Modern Utopia" in which people from our timeline were shown traveling to another, but Wells used this mainly as a literary device to present his speculations of a perfect society. Leinster's story, conversely, introduced the concept to the pulp science fiction readership, bringing about the creation of one of the field's subgenres.

In 1966, Sam Moskowitz acknowledged that the story "introduces an idea on time travel that had never previously been used", but took Leinster to task for not elaborating on that idea:

The unfortunate thing was that Leinster took only 20,000 words instead of 100,000 to expound his hypothesis. The result was an outline more than a story, from which other authors reaped the benefits.

Moskowitz also notes the similarities between Leinster's concept of time and the ideas of J. W. Dunne.

In his comments on the story in Before the Golden Age (1974), Isaac Asimov writes that "Sidewise in Time" had a long-term effect on his thinking. "It always made me conscious of the 'ifs' in history, and this showed up not only in my science fiction, as in 'The Red Queen's Race', but in my serious books on history as well. I also used the alternate-history theme, in enormous complexity, in my novel The End of Eternity."

== Publication history ==
- Astounding Stories, June 1934
- Sidewise in Time, edited by Murray Leinster, Shasta, 1950
- Worlds of Maybe, edited by Robert Silverberg, Dell, 1970
- Before the Golden Age, edited by Isaac Asimov, Doubleday, 1974
- The Best of Murray Leinster, edited by J.J. Pierce, Del Rey, 1978
- The Time Travellers—A Science Fiction Quartet, edited by Robert Silverberg & Martin H. Greenberg, Donald I. Fine, 1985
- Great Tales of Classic Science Fiction, edited by Isaac Asimov, Martin H. Greenberg & Charles Waugh, Galahad, 1988
- First Contacts, edited by Joe Rico, NESFA Press, 1998
