= Ross Rocklynne =

American novelist

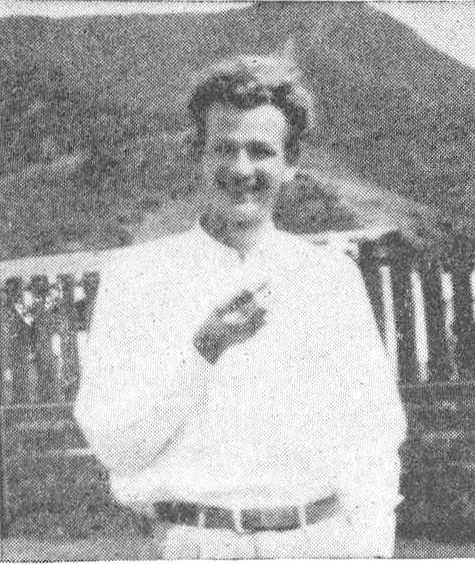
- Ross Rocklynne c. 1954
- Born: Ross Louis Rocklin; February 21, 1913; Cincinnati, Ohio, US
- Died: October 29, 1988 (aged 75); Los Angeles, California, US

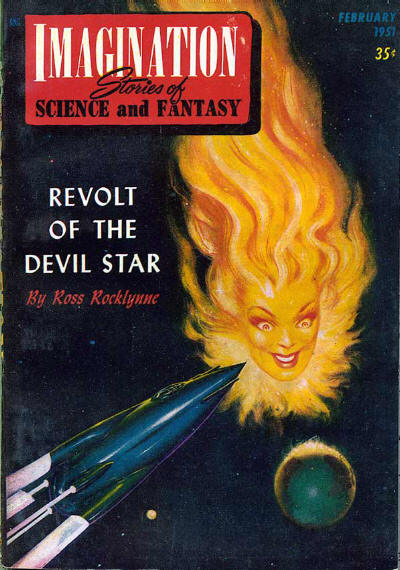
Rocklynne's novelette "Revolt of the Devil Star" was the cover story in the February 1951 issue of Imagination

Ross Rocklynne (February 21, 1913 – October 29, 1988) was the pen name used by Ross Louis Rocklin, an American science fiction author active in the Golden Age of Science Fiction. He also wrote under the pen names Paul Cahendon, R. L. Rocklin and R. Rocklinne.

== Life and career ==
Born in 1913 in Cincinnati, Ohio, Rocklynne was a regular contributor to several science fiction pulps including Astounding Stories, Fantastic Adventures and Planet Stories.

His love of science fiction began at the age of 12 when he was living at a boys' home, Kappa Sigma Pi, where he says a Black janitor introduced him to the genre. Rocklynne remembered the story that turned him into a life-long fan was the first installment of E.E. Smith's, "The Skylark of Space" in the August 1928 issue of Amazing Stories.

During his youth, Rocklynne was active in the world of science-fiction fandom and contributed many pieces of writing to amateur and semi-professional fanzines. In 1939, he attended the first World Science Fiction Convention in New York City where met the greats of First Fandom and became life-long friends with the likes of Forrest J. Ackerman, Ray Bradbury, Charles Hornig and many others.

His father, Francis Rocklin, was an inventor and basement tinkerer who spent much of his life trying to perfect a perpetual motion machine. Ross sometimes helped him with inventions including some that were written up in Popular Mechanics, including an upside-down pocket and a funnel-shaped keyhole.

He sold his first story, "Man of Iron" to Astounding Stories in 1935 "[a]fter four years of spasmodic writing." Despite his numerous appearances and solid writing, Rocklynne never quite achieved the fame of his contemporaries Robert A. Heinlein, L. Sprague de Camp, and Isaac Asimov.

One of his best-known stories is "The Men and the Mirror" from the July 1938 issue of Astounding Stories which author and friend of 40 years Arthur Jean Cox called a “perfectly engineered piece of fiction, with a dramatic situation growing neatly and naturally out of a scientific problem.” The story was the third of six "problem" stories that featured characters Colbie, a police officer, and Deverel, a wanted criminal, although sometimes their names were changed in the stories for editorial reasons. Other stories in the series are "At the Center of Gravity" (1936), "Jupiter Trap" (1937), "They Fly So High" (1952), "The Bottled Men" (1946) and "And Then There Was One" (1940).

In the June 1940 issue of Astonishing Stories, Rocklynne published “Into the Darkness,” the first of four stories he wrote about sentient stars that were later published as a novel, “The Sun Destroyers,” which was half of a 1973 Ace Double.

His only other story series is the five-story Sidney Hallmeyer series which ran from 1940 to 1945 which have never been collected into book form. These stories feature the exploits of an interplanetary diplomat employed by the "Bureau of Transmitted Egos" who temporarily inhabits the body of one of the planet's inhabitants in order to facilitate negotiations.

Perhaps his most famous story from that era was 1941's "Time Wants a Skeleton", which has been reprinted in several anthologies, including Asimov's Mammoth Book of Golden Age Science Fiction.

That year, he married Frances Rosenthal, a teacher of literature and creative writing and Writer's Digest editor who wrote two books about writing under the name F.A. Rockwell. They divorced in 1947.

One of Rocklynne's stories from Galaxy Magazine, "Jaywalker," was adapted as a half-hour radio drama for the NBC science fiction series X-Minus One.

Rocklynne partially retired from writing in 1954 around the time he began dabbling in Dianetics, but the main reason he stopped was because he developed an extremely painful affliction of the face and jaw. Rocklynne found that he could forget the pain only when involved in some physical activity or when socially engaged with others. When he was alone the pain tended to monopolize his attention and this made the lonely and reflective pursuit of writing very difficult, if not impossible.

He supported himself for the next 15 years driving and dispatching taxis in Los Angeles, but returned to science fiction writing in 1967 and continued publishing stories until 1973. His most notable story during this time was the novelette "Ching Witch!" which was included in Harlan Ellison's original anthology, Again, Dangerous Visions (1972).

Rocklynne died in Los Angeles, California, at the age of 75 due to complications of heart disease. Forrest J. Ackerman delivered the eulogy at Rocklynne's funeral.

== Short stories ==
- "Man of Iron", Astounding Stories, August 1935
- "The Men and the Mirror", Astounding Stories, July 1938
- "Into the Darkness", Astonishing Stories, June 1940
- "Quietus", Astounding Science-Fiction, September 1940 (appeared in the 1946 anthology Adventures in Time and Space)
- "Time Wants a Skeleton", 1941
- "Gift Horse", Astounding, August 1945
- "The Infidels", Astounding, September 1945
- "Jaywalker", Galaxy Science Fiction, December 1950
- "Touch of the Moon", Galaxy Science Fiction, April 1968
- "Find the Face", Galaxy Science Fiction, August 1968
- "Ching Witch!", Again, Dangerous Visions, 1972
- "Sorry: Wrong Dimension"
