= Space Platform =

1953 novel by Murray Leinster

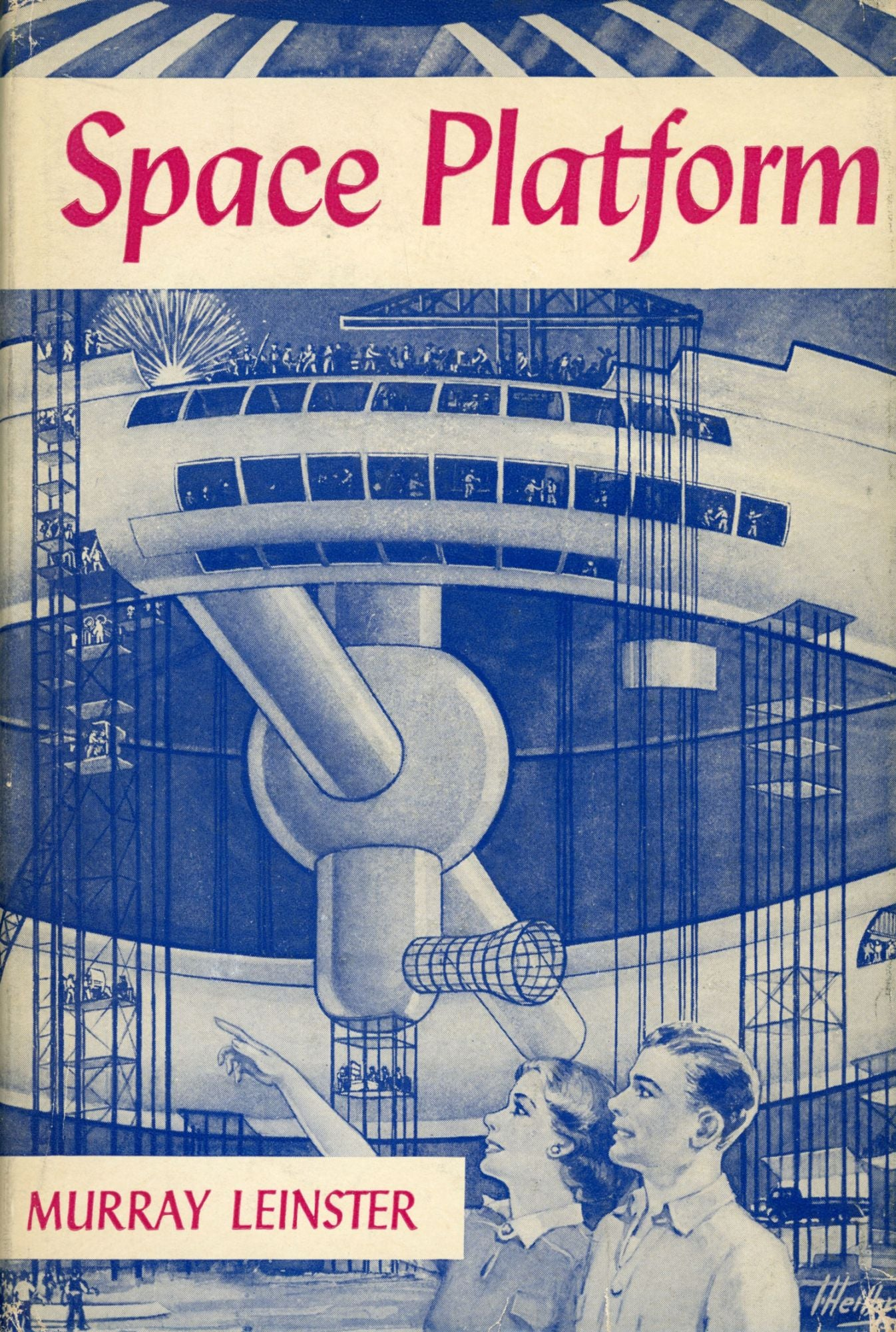
- Dust-jacket from the first edition
- Author: Murray Leinster
- Cover artist: I. (Isaac) Heilbron
- Language: English
- Series: Joe Kenmore
- Genre: Young adult science fiction
- Publisher: Shasta Publishers
- Publication date: 1953
- Publication place: United States
- Media type: Print (Hardback)
- Pages: 223
- OCLC: 1953791
- Followed by: Space Tug

Space Platform is a young adult science fiction novel by American writer Murray Leinster. It was published in 1953 by Shasta Publishers in an edition of 5,000 copies. It is the first novel in the author's Joe Kenmore series. The next, Space Tug, picks up almost immediately where Space Platform leaves off.

== Plot summary ==
America seeks to construct a Space Platform (station) to be deployed into medium Earth orbit. It will provide a waystation for deeper exploration of space, prevent "them" from continuing to threaten freedom around the world via atomic war by providing both monitoring and near-space military supremacy to the USA, and serve humanity by providing a facility to conduct "nuclear experiments" too dangerous to perform on Earth. The construction project is subject to a relentless campaign of sabotage by its enemies (obviously the Communists, though they are never explicitly named as such). The forms of sabotage include murder, blackmail, fuel tampering, missile attacks on flights, bombings of ground supply routes, and even radiological terrorism.

Within this broader context, the novel centers on Joe Kenmore, a master machinist whose father's company is tasked with building the pilot gyroscopes which will be responsible for attitude control of the Platform. It opens with Joe being tasked by Kenmore Machine Tool to accompany the ultra-precision mechanism to its destination and oversee its installation. Following the attack upon their flight which damages the gyros, it continues with the work of Joe and his friends to salvage the project while battling relentless saboteur attacks. They discover that the damaged gyros can be rebalanced in their damaged state and construction reaches completion.

Upon completion, a last-ditch attack is made against the Platform on the ground by saboteurs. This is followed by a long-range missile tipped with a nuclear warhead, which is successfully intercepted. "A certain block of associated countries" threaten to walk out on the UN. The launch suddenly becomes do-or-die, as if it is not in place to prevent atomic war it is about to incite one.

Along the way, Joe meets the daughter of the Major commanding the construction project, and they fall in love.

At the end, Leinster breaks the 4th wall and informs the reader that he has attempted to describe a realistic scenario whereby a space station would be placed into orbit. He indicates the advantage of launch sites near to the equator, and describes a multi-stage launch process which begins with the use of numerous small jet-powered craft ("pushpots") to lift the station and begin its flight, JATOs aboard the pushpots to accelerate it to several thousand MPH, and finally solid fuel rockets which minimize weight by burning away their tubes as the propellant combusts. The descriptions of the Platform's heavy (steel) construction are unrealistic, given that weight is recognized as crucial. Suggesting that launchers will combust Beryllium in Fluorine to maximize energy per unit of fuel is not incorrect as far as energy release, but downplays spectacular corrosion and toxicity problem.

== Reception ==
P. Schuyler Miller reported the novel was marked by "the fastest kind of action" and "the feeling of technical authenticity."

== Sources ==
- Chalker, Jack L.; Mark Owings (1998). The Science-Fantasy Publishers: A Bibliographic History, 1923-1998. Westminster, MD and Baltimore: Mirage Press, Ltd.
- Clute, John; Peter Nicholls (1995). The Encyclopedia of Science Fiction. New York: St. Martin's Griffin. ISBN 0-312-13486-X.
- Tuck, Donald H. (1974). The Encyclopedia of Science Fiction and Fantasy. Chicago: Advent. ISBN 0-911682-20-1.
