= Angus MacVicar =

Scottish author

- Born: 28 October 1908; Argyll, Scotland
- Died: 31 October 2001 (aged 93); Campbeltown, Scotland
- Occupation: Author
- Writing career
- Genres: Crime thrillers, science fiction, memoirs

Angus MacVicar (28 October 1908, Argyll – 31 October 2001, Campbeltown, Argyll and Bute) was a Scottish author with a wide-ranging output. His greatest successes came in three separate genres: crime thrillers, juvenile science fiction, and autobiography. His early writing was interrupted by wartime service with the Royal Scots Fusiliers, hence most of his fiction appeared in the two decades following World War II.

MacVicar, whose father (also Angus) was a Presbyterian minister in the Church of Scotland (including at Southend from 1910 to 1957), was born at the manse at Southend, where he lived for most of his life, including at 'Achnamara', the bungalow he had built overlooking Southend Bay following his marriage to Jean. After attending the University of Glasgow he went on to work for the Campbeltown Courier. The MacVicar family was notably long-lived; the senior, Reverend Angus MacVicar lived to be 92; MacVicar's younger brother, Kenneth, entered the church, serving as Chaplain to the Queen in Scotland, and died aged 96.

Highlights of MacVicar's many thrillers included the Edgar Wallace-style Greybreek (1947) and The Killings on Kersivay (1962), plus some books with golfing backgrounds.

His children's stories combine simple character sketches and exotic adventure with a non-obtrusive Christian morality. The Lost Planet series was created for radio and also popular in book and TV versions (he was also an accomplished screenwriter and playwright). In these stories a pacifist theme came through strongly. There are six novels in the Lost Planet series: The Lost Planet (1953), Return to the Lost Planet (1954), Secret of the Lost Planet (1955), Red Fire on the Lost Planet (1959), Peril on the Lost Planet (1960) and Space Agent from the Lost Planet (1961). The playwright Rona Munro (who is also MacVicar's second cousin once removed) credited the Lost Planet books and MacVicar himself as formative influences on her own decision to become a writer.

It was the first science fiction series ever translated to Hebrew, and had considerable impact on the development of this genre in Israel.

The short unrelated Atom Chasers series was also popular.

In later life MacVicar turned to portraying his life and background as a child of the Manse in several memoirs such as Salt in My Porridge (1971). These books showed his Scottish literary voice at its most characteristic, unhampered by the genre requirements of his fiction.

MacVicar also presented the BBC television program Songs of Praise.

== See also ==
- Planets in science fiction (Hesikos)
- Fictional planets of the Solar System (Elsewhere in the Solar System)
