= Starship Through Space =

1954 novel by G. Harry Stine

- First edition cover
- Author: Lee Correy
- Illustrator: Bill Llewellyn
- Language: English
- Genre: Science fiction
- Published: 1954 (Henry Holt)
- Publisher: Henry Holt and Company
- Publication place: United States
- Media type: Print (hardback)
- Pages: 241 (hardback edition)
- OCLC: 1895314
- Preceded by: "...And a Star to Steer Her By"

Starship Through Space is a science-fiction novel written by G. Harry Stine under the pseudonym Lee Correy. It was published in 1954 by Henry Holt and Company. The book tells the story of the building of the first starship and of its flight to Alpha Centauri.

It is the sequel to "...And a Star to Steer Her By", first published in the June 1953 issue of Astounding Science Fiction.

== Plot summary ==
Walter Hansman has just graduated from Schiaparelli Space Academy on Mars in June 2150. His father, Dr. George W. Hansman, sends a telegram telling him to return to Terra immediately. Finding that he automatically has all of the necessary permissions from the Terrestrial Space Navy, he goes to Red Sands Spaceport, where he boards the Space Ship Fafnir for his journey home.

On the ship he finds that Don Salter, a classmate from Schiaparelli, is also going to Terra on mysterious orders. Together the two young men help prepare SS Fafnir for launch and then help around the ship on the long flight to Terra. Finally the ship lands at Peak City Spaceport, at the foot of the Rocky Mountains, and the men find their fathers waiting for them.

Taken to a small, closed-off spaceport, Walt and Don are told that they are to participate in the construction and flight of humanity's first interstellar spaceship, one equipped with a space-warping hyperdrive. After extensive physical and psychological testing, Don is assigned to work on the starship's propulsion and Walt is to help develop the control circuits. When the ship is complete and ready for flight, she is christened with the name of Magellan's ship, Vittoria, and prepared for a trial run to Pluto.

Under inertial drive Vittoria rises into space and accelerates to a speed close to the speed of light. The crew then engages the "high drive", which pushes the ship into hyperspace, enabling the ship, in essence, to fly faster than light. At the research station on Pluto the crew takes some R&R and makes needed repairs to the ship, then they take Vittoria back to Earth, putting her into orbit near the space station Asgard.

After the crew makes more extensive repairs and upgrades the ship, after loading aboard more provisions and additional crew members, Vittoria heads back out into space and sets course for Alpha Centauri. When the ship arrives at that destination the crew discovers that the second planet of Alpha Centauri A is Earth-like. Bringing Vittoria down on that planet obliges Walt and Don to take one of the ship's small rocket shuttles down to the surface and set up a landing radar.

As Vittoria lands on what Walt and Don have named New Terra, the two men see two perfectly human-looking natives also watching the ship. Walt makes initial contact and finds that the natives, who call themselves Ainsath, are friendly and eager to talk. Though primitive-looking, the Ainsath are highly civilized, but, where Terrans built their engineering expertise mostly on physics, the Ainsath have done so on chemistry and biology. Later the ship's doctor discovers that the Ainsath are not native to New Terra: as far as he can tell, they are biologically identical to the Terrans.

One day Walt and Don are taken alone to the nearby Ainsath city and led to an old woman, who reads from a book that mimics Genesis up to the Tower of Babel and then deviates from it. The Ainsath are Terrans, displaced millennia ago.

Vittoria returns to Terra with two of the Ainsath as passengers. After receiving a noisy reception at Peak City Spaceport, Walt, now Starman Hansman, is ready to head back out to the stars.

== Publication history ==
- 1954, US, Henry Holt and Company, Pub date 1954 Apr 01, Hardback (241 pp).
- 1955, Italy, Arnoldo Mondadori Editore #75, Pub date 1955 Mar, Softcover digest (128 pp), as Operazione Centauro (Operation Centauri).
- 1982, Italy, Libra Editrice (I Classici della Fantascienza #65), Pub date 1982 Jan, Hardback (354 pp), as Operazione Centauro.

== Reviews ==
The book was reviewed by

- Groff Conklin at Galaxy Science Fiction (Aug 1954)
- The Editors at The Magazine of Fantasy and Science Fiction (Aug 1954)
- Henry Bott at Imagination (Nov 1954)
- P. Schuyler Miller at Astounding Science Fiction (Nov 1954)
