= Charles R. Tanner =

American poet

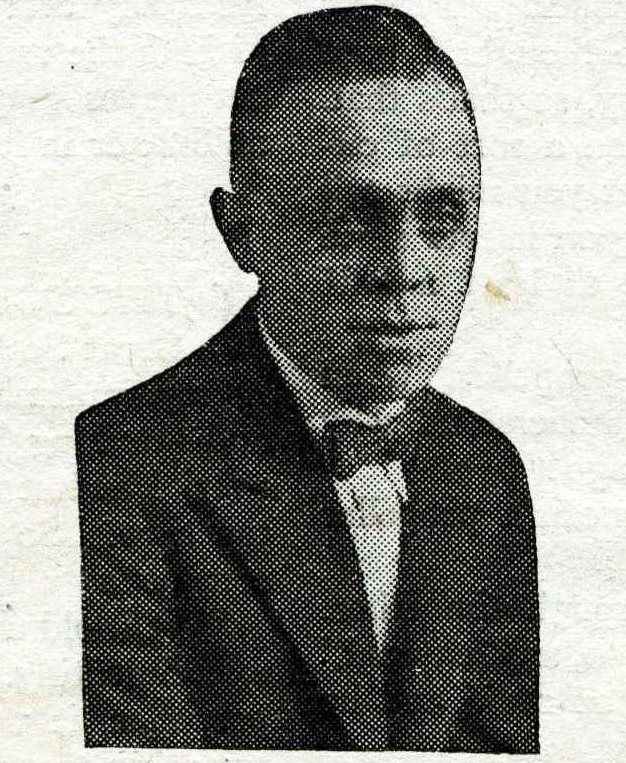
- Born: February 17, 1896; Cincinnati, Ohio
- Died: January 9, 1974 (aged 77)
- Occupations: Short story writer, poet
- Writing career
- Genres: horror, fantasy, science fiction

Charles Roland Tanner (February 17, 1896 – 9 January 1974) was an American science fiction and fantasy author who wrote in the late 1930s and early 1940s, best known for his Tumithak series of stories.

Tanner's first short story was "The Color of Space", published in Science Wonder Stories in 1930. Within a few years, he created his character Tumithak, who featured in three stories published during Tanner's lifetime ("Tumithak of the Corridors", "Tumithak in Shawm", and "Tumithak and the Towers of Fire") and a fourth, "Tumithak and the Ancient Word", published posthumously in 2005.

During the Great Depression, one of Tanner's three children died, while his wife suffered an extended hospitalization for tuberculosis.

== Bibliography ==
- "The Color of Space" (1930)
- "The Flight of the Mercury" (1930)
- "Tumithak of the Corridors" (1932)
- "Tumithak in Shawm" (1933)
- "The Vanishing Diamonds" (1938)
- "Out of the Jar" (1941)
- "The Stillwell Degravitator" (1941)
- "The Improbable" (1941)
- "Tumithak of the Towers of Fire" (1941)
- "Cham of the Hills" (1942)
- "The Luck of Enoch Higgins" (1942)
- "The Revolt of the Machine Men" (1942)
- "Mutiny in the Void" (1943)
- "Mr. Garfinkel and the Lepra-Cohen" (1950)
- "Johnny Goodturn" (1950)
- "Angus MacAuliffe and the Gowden Tooch" (1951)
- "Tumithak and the Ancient Word" (2005)
