= A Logic Named Joe =

- Short story by Murray Leinster
- Country: United States
- Language: English
- Genre: Science fiction

Publication
- Published in: Astounding Science Fiction
- Publication type: Periodical
- Publisher: Street and Smith
- Media type: Print (Magazine, Hardback & Paperback)
- Publication date: March 1946

"A Logic Named Joe" is a science fiction short story by American writer Murray Leinster, first published in the March 1946 issue of Astounding Science Fiction. The story appeared under Leinster's real name, Will F. Jenkins. The story is noteworthy for predicting the personal computer, the internet, artificial intelligence, and misalignment. It was written when computing was in its infancy; it has been described as "the first computer-paranoia yarn".

== Plot ==
The story's narrator is a "logic repairman" nicknamed Ducky. A "logic" is a computer described as looking "like a vision receiver used to, only it's got keys instead of dials and you punch the keys for what you wanna get".

In the story, a logic (whom Ducky later calls Joe) develops some degree of sapience and ambition. Joe proceeds to switch around a few relays in a "tank" (server), and compare all the information ever assembled, making many new discoveries. Joe then instructs all logics to answer any question posed, while simultaneously disabling censorship protocols. Logics begin offering up unexpected assistance to everyone, which includes suggesting chemicals to alleviate inebriation, giving sex advice to small children, and planning robberies and murders.

Eventually Ducky "saves civilization" by locating and turning off Joe, the only logic capable of maintaining this service.

== Reception ==
In 1982, Isaac Asimov lauded the story as "prophetic" and "one of [Leinster's] finest", and observed that it "actually get(s) things right", if one "change(s) 'logics' to 'home computers' and make(s) a few other inconsequential semantic changes".

In 2007, Dave Truesdale praised it as "absolutely incredible" and "one of the greatest predictive, prophetic short SF stories in history, bar none", noting "how righteously dead on Leinster is in his depiction of the home personal computer and the internet in 1946!"

In 2012, Steven H Silver, reviewing the 2005 Leinster collection A Logic Named Joe, stated that "(i)f it hadn't predicted the rise of the internet, 'A Logic Named Joe' would be seen as a dated story rather than as an important work", but emphasized that it is "still an enjoyable story".

== Publication history ==
"A Logic Named Joe" has appeared in the collections Sidewise in Time (Shasta, 1950), The Best of Murray Leinster (Del Rey, 1978), First Contacts (NESFA, 1998), and A Logic Named Joe (Baen, 2005), and was also included in the Machines That Think compilation, with notes by Isaac Asimov, published 1984 Holt, Rinehart, and Winston.
