= Murray Leinster =

American fiction writer (1896–1975)

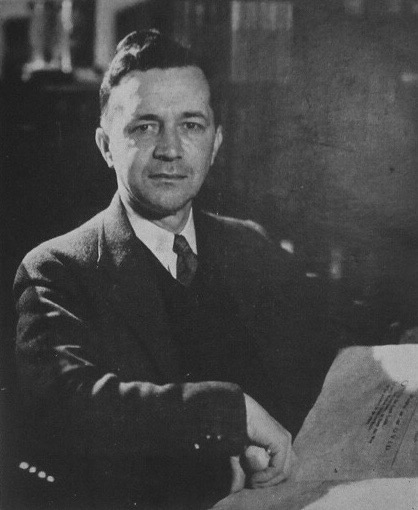
- Leinster c. 1953
- Born: William Fitzgerald Jenkins; June 16, 1896; Norfolk, Virginia, U.S.
- Died: June 8, 1975 (aged 78); Gloucester, Virginia, U.S.
- Occupations: Novelist, short story writer
- Writing career
- Pen name: Murray Leinster, William Fitzgerald, Louisa Carter Lee, Will F. Jenkins, Fitzgerald Jenkins
- Genres: Fantasy, science fiction, horror fiction, mystery fiction, Western fiction, pulp fiction
- Website: www.murrayleinster.com/about.html

Signature
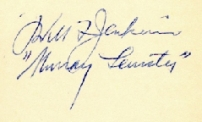

Murray Leinster (/ˈlɛnstər/) was a pen name of William Fitzgerald Jenkins (June 16, 1896 – June 8, 1975), an American writer of genre fiction, particularly of science fiction. He wrote and published more than 1,500 short stories and articles.

== Early life ==
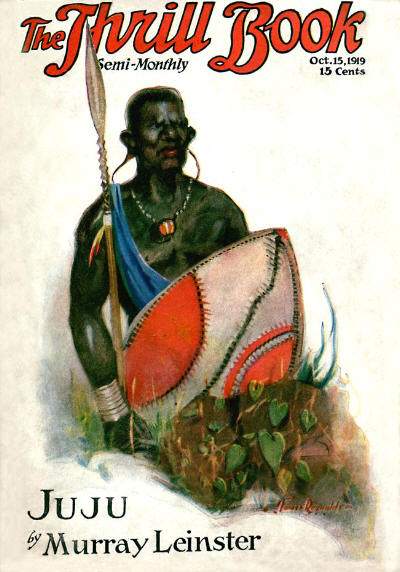
Leinster's "Juju" was the cover story of The Thrill Book in October 1919.

Leinster was born in Norfolk, Virginia, the son of George B. Jenkins and Mary L. Jenkins. His father was an accountant. Although both parents were born in Virginia, the family lived in Manhattan in 1910, according to the 1910 Federal Census. After dropping out of school in the 8th grade due to his family's financial difficulties, he nevertheless began a career as a freelance writer before World War I.

== Career ==
Leinster was just 20 when his first story, "The Anti-Climax", appeared in the July 1916 issue of H. L. Mencken's literary magazine The Smart Set. Over the next two years, Leinster published four more stories and almost a dozen sketches in the magazine; in a September 2022 interview, Leinster's daughter stated that Mencken recommended the use of a pseudonym for non-Smart Set content.

During World War I, Leinster served with the Committee of Public Information and the United States Army (1917–1918). During and after the war, his work began appearing in pulp magazines like Argosy, Snappy Stories, and Breezy Stories. He continued to be published regularly in Argosy into the 1950s.

When the pulp magazines began to diversify into particular genres in the 1920s, Leinster followed suit, selling jungle stories to Danger Trails, westerns to West and Cowboy Stories, detective stories to Black Mask and Mystery Stories, horror stories to Weird Tales, and even romance stories to Love Story Magazine under the pen name Louisa Carter Lee.

Leinster's first science fiction story, "The Runaway Skyscraper", appeared in the February 22, 1919 issue of Argosy, and was reprinted in the June 1926 issue of Hugo Gernsback's first science fiction magazine, Amazing Stories. In the 1930s, he published several science fiction stories and serials in Amazing and Astounding Stories (the first issue of Astounding included his story "Tanks"). His work continued to appear frequently in other genre pulps such as Detective Fiction Weekly and Smashing Western, as well as Collier's Weekly beginning in 1936 and Esquire starting in 1939.

Leinster was an early writer of parallel universe stories. Four years before Jack Williamson's The Legion of Time came out, Leinster published his "Sidewise in Time" in the June 1934 issue of Astounding. Leinster's vision of extraordinary oscillations in time ('sidewise in time') had a long-term impact on other authors, for example Isaac Asimov's "Living Space", "The Red Queen's Race", and The End of Eternity.

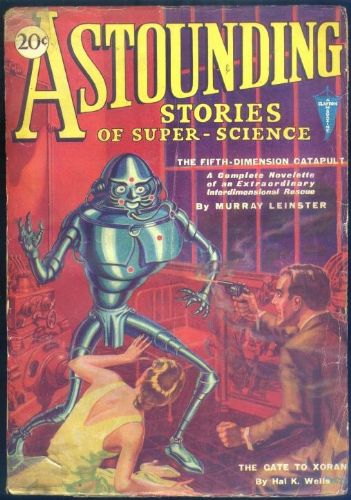
Leinster's "The Fifth-Dimensional Catapult" was the cover story in the January 1931 Astounding Stories.

Leinster's 1945 novella "First Contact" is also credited as one of the first (if not the first) instances of a universal translator in science fiction. In 2000, Leinster's heirs sued Paramount Pictures over the film Star Trek: First Contact, claiming that it infringed their trademark in the term. However, the suit was dismissed.

Leinster was one of the few science fiction writers from the 1930s to survive in the John W. Campbell era of higher writing standards, publishing over three dozen stories in Astounding and Analog under Campbell's editorship. The last story by Leinster in Analog was "Quarantine World" in the November 1966 issue, thirty-six years after his appearance in the premier January 1930 issue.

Murray Leinster's 1946 short story "A Logic Named Joe" contains one of the first descriptions of a computer (called a "logic") in fiction. In the story, Leinster was decades ahead of his time in imagining the Internet. He envisioned logics in every home, linked through a distributed system of servers (called "tanks"), to provide communications, entertainment, data access, and commerce; one character says that "logics are civilization."

During World War II, he served in the United States Office of War Information. After the war, when both his name and the pulps had achieved a wider acceptance, he would use either "William Fitzgerald", "Fitzgerald Jenkins" or "Will F. Jenkins" as names on stories when "Leinster" had already sold a piece to a particular issue.

Leinster was so prolific a writer that Groff Conklin, when reviewing Operation: Outer Space in March 1955, noted that it was his fourth novel of 1954 and that another would be reviewed in the next month. Leinster continued publishing in the 1950s and 1960s, appearing in Galaxy Magazine and The Magazine of Fantasy and Science Fiction, as well as The Saturday Evening Post. He won a Hugo Award for his 1956 story "Exploration Team".

Leinster's career also included tie-in fiction. His first such book, a Western by-lined Will F. Jenkins, was a novelization of Dallas (1950, screenplay by John Twist), which adds a great deal of original, prequel-like backstory before the adaptation of the script itself begins. This was followed by books based on based on several science fiction TV series: an episodic 1960 novel, Men into Space, was derived from the series' basic concepts, but Leinster had little knowledge of the series' actual content, and none of the book episodes bear any relationship to the filmed episodes. Men Into Space was followed, seven years later, by two original novels based on The Time Tunnel (1967), and three based on Land of the Giants (1968–69). These, as well, reflected Leinster's "take" on the material he was provided, and diverged from their respective TV series in significant ways.

It's worth noting that Leinster's own wholly original novel, Time Tunnel (1964) is unrelated to his first tie-in to the similarly named TV series (the difference is the definite article, "the"), which appeared only a year later…from the same publisher (Pyramid Books) and whose retail editions featured a bottom-half crop of the same cover art—a white line drawing against a black background of two men and a woman running through a spiraled tunnel. This art repurposing was almost certainly an error (Pyramid's art department mistaking the new tie-in for a reprint of the non tie-in book) and it continues to confuse some readers and collectors to this day. The tie-in's book club edition (unmarked specifically as such) corrected this by swapping in a production photo from the TV series. (It has been posited that among the reasons Pyramid got the tie-in license, and Leinster the tie-in commission, was because of Leinster's earlier novel, to indemnify Irwin Allen Productions against any potential charge of copyright infringement.)

== Other endeavors ==
Leinster was also an inventor under his real name of William F. Jenkins, best known for the front projection process used in special effects. He appeared in September 1953 on an episode of the educational series American Inventory, in which he discussed the possibility of space travel.

== Pseudonym ==
"Murray" is a reference to Leinster's mother's maiden name ("Murry"), while "Leinster" alluded to the connection between his middle name ("Fitzgerald") and the Dukes of Leinster.

== Personal life ==
In 1921, he married Mary Mandola. They had four daughters.

== Honors and awards ==
- Liberty Award (1937) for "A Very Nice Family", first published in the January 2, 1937 issue of Liberty.
- Hugo Award (1956) for Best Novelette for "Exploration Team".
- Retro-Hugo (1996) for Best Novelette for "First Contact".
- Guest of Honor at Discon I, the 21st Worldcon in 1963.
- The Sidewise Award for Alternate History (established in 1995) is named after Leinster's story "Sidewise in Time."
- In the 1979 American-Italian film Starcrash, the spaceship in the opening sequence is called the Murray Leinster.
- In Virginia, June 27, 2009, was designated Will F. Jenkins Day in honor of his achievements in science fiction.

== Bibliography ==
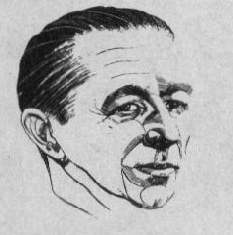
Leinster as depicted in Amazing Stories in 1953

=== Novels ===
==== Far East ====
- Sword of Kings, John Long, 1933.

==== Mystery ====
- Scalps, Brewer & Warren, 1930. (also known as Wings of Chance)
- Murder Madness, Brewer & Warren, 1931; first serialized in Astounding, May - August 1930.
- Murder Will Out (as Will F. Jenkins), John Hamilton, 1932.
- No Clues (as Will F. Jenkins), Wright & Brown, 1935.
- Murder in the Family (as Will F. Jenkins), John Hamilton, 1935; first appeared in Complete Detective Novels, April 1934.
- The Man Who Feared (as Will F. Jenkins), Gateway, 1942; first serialized in Detective Fiction Weekly, August 9–30, 1930.

==== Romance ====
as Louisa Carter Lee

- Her Desert Lover: A Love Story, Chelsea House 1925.
- Her Other Husband: A Love Story, Chelsea House 1929.
- Love and Better: A Love Story, Chelsea House 1931.

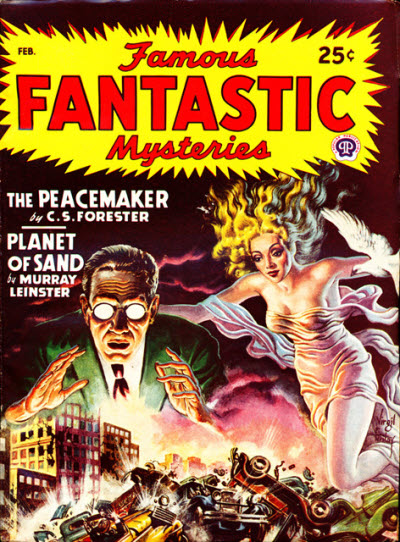
Leinster's "Planet of Sand" was cover-featured on the February 1948 issue of Famous Fantastic Mysteries.

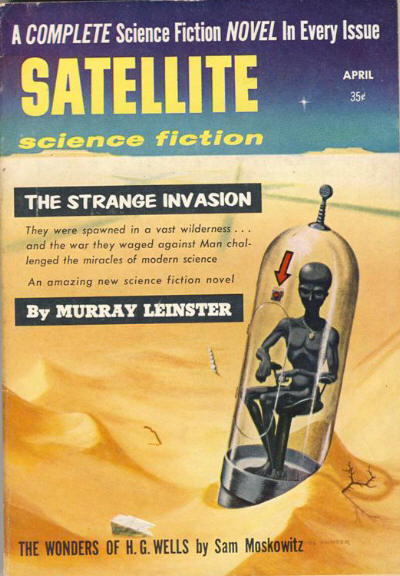
Leinster's "The Strange Invasion" was the cover story on the April 1958 issue of Satellite Science Fiction. It was issued in book form later that year as War with the Gizmos.

==== Science fiction ====
===== Joe Kenmore series =====
- Space Platform, Shasta Publishers, February 1953.
- Space Tug, Shasta Publishers, 1953
- City on the Moon, Avalon, 1957.

===== Other novels =====
- The Murder of the U.S.A. (as Will F. Jenkins), Crown, 1946.
- Fight for Life, Crestwood, 1949.
- The Last Spaceship (novel), Frederick Fell, Inc., 1950
- The Black Galaxy, Galaxy, 1954; first appeared in Startling, March 1949.
- Gateway to Elsewhere, Ace, 1954; first appeared as "Journey to Barkut" in Startling, January 1952.
- The Brain-Stealers, Ace, 1954; first appeared as "The Man in the Iron Cap" in Startling, November 1947.
- Operation: Outer Space, Fantasy Press, 1954.
- The Forgotten Planet, Ace, 1954.
- The Other Side of Here, Ace, 1955; first serialized as The Incredible Invasion in Astounding, August - December 1936.
- The Planet Explorer, Gnome Press; HUGO Award for best novel of the year, 1957.
- War with the Gizmos, Fawcett, 1958.
- Four from Planet 5, Fawcett, 1959; first appeared as "Long Ago, Far Away" in Amazing, September 1959.
- The Monster from Earth's End, Fawcett, January 1959.
- The Mutant Weapon, Ace, 1959; first appeared as "Med Service" in Astounding, August 1957.
- The Pirates of Zan, Ace, 1959; first serialized as The Pirates of Ersatz in Astounding, February - April 1959.
- Men Into Space, Berkley, 1960; an episodic but original novel, based on the eponymous television series.
- The Wailing Asteroid, Avon, December 1960.

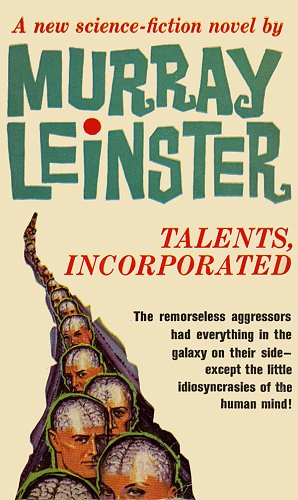
Talents Incorporated book cover.

- Creatures of the Abyss, Berkley, 1961 (also known as The Listeners).
- This World is Taboo, Ace, 1961; first appeared as "Pariah Planet" in Amazing, July 1961.
- Operation Terror, Berkley, 1962.
- Talents Incorporated, Avon, 1962.
- The Other Side of Nowhere, Berkley, May 1964; first serialized as Spaceman in Analog, March - April 1964.
- Time Tunnel, Pyramid, July 1964.
- The Duplicators, Ace, 1964; first appeared as "Lord of the Uffts" in Worlds of Tomorrow, February 1964.
- The Greks Bring Gifts, Macfadden, 1964.
- Invaders of Space, Berkley, December 1964.
- Space Captain, Ace, 1966; first serialized as Killer Ship in Amazing, October - December.
- Checkpoint Lambda, Berkley, 1966; first serialized as Stopover in Space in Amazing, June - August 1966.
- Miners in the Sky, Avon, April 1967.
- Space Gypsies, Avon, June 1967.
- The Time Tunnel, Pyramid, January 1967; original promotional novel based on the 1966–1967 U.S. television series The Time Tunnel, a very different story than Leinster's 1964 novel of the same name.
- The Time Tunnel: Timeslip!, Pyramid, July 1967; original novel based on the television series.
- Land of the Giants, Pyramid, September 1968; original novel based on television series, reinventing the origin story.
- Land of the Giants 2: The Hot Spot, Pyramid, April 1969; original novel based on the television series.
- Land of the Giants 3: Unknown Danger, Pyramid, September 1969; original novel based on the television series.
- Politics, in Amazing Stories, No. 6, June 1932

==== Western ====
- The Gamblin' Kid (as Will F. Jenkins), A. L. Burt, 1933; first appeared in Western Action Novels, March 1937.
- Mexican Trail (as Will F. Jenkins), A. L. Burt, 1933.
- Outlaw Sheriff (as Will F. Jenkins), King, 1934.
- Fighting Horse Valley (as Will F. Jenkins), King, 1934.
- Kid Deputy (as Will F. Jenkins), Alfred H. King, 1935; first serialized in Triple-X Western, February - April 1928.
- Black Sheep (as Will F. Jenkins), Julian Messer, 1936.
- Guns for Achin (as Will F. Jenkins), Wright & Brown, 1936; first appeared in Smashing Novels, November 1936.
- Wanted Dead or Alive!, Quarter Books, 1949; first serialized in Triple-X Magazine, February - May 1929.
- Outlaw Guns, Star Books, 1950.
- Dallas (as Will F. Jenkins), Fawcett, 1950 (novelization of the screenplay by John Twist).
- Son of the Flying 'Y' (as Will F. Jenkins), Fawcett, 1951.
- Cattle Rustlers (as Will F. Jenkins), Ward Lock, 1952.

=== Story collections ===
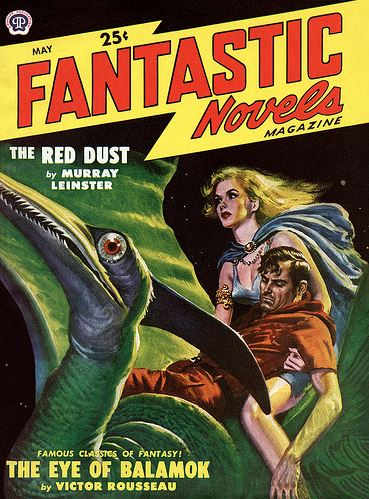
Reprint of "The Red Dust", May 1949

- The Last Space Ship, Fell, 1949.
  - "The Boomerang Circuit", Thrilling Wonder, June 1947
  - "The Disciplinary Circuit", Thrilling Wonder, Winter 1946
  - "The Manless Worlds", Thrilling Wonder, February 1947
- Sidewise in Time, Shasta Publishers, 1950.
  - "Sidewise in Time", Astounding, June 1934
  - "Proxima Centauri", Astounding, March 1935
  - "A Logic Named Joe" (as Will F. Jenkins), Astounding, March 1946
  - "De Profundis", Thrilling Wonder, Winter 1945
  - "The Fourth-Dimensional Demonstrator", Astounding, December 1935
  - "Power", Astounding, September 1945
- The Forgotten Planet, Gnome Press, 1954.
  - "The Mad Planet", Argosy, June 12, 1920
  - "The Red Dust", Argosy All-Story Weekly, April 2, 1921
  - "Nightmare Planet", Science Fiction Plus, June 12, 1952
- Colonial Survey, Gnome Press, 1957 (also known as The Planet Explorer).
  - "Solar Constant", Astounding, July 1956 as "Critical Difference"
  - "Sand Doom", Astounding, December 1955
  - "Combat Team", Astounding, March 1956 as "Exploration Team"
  - "The Swamp Was Upside Down", Astounding, September 1956
- Out of This World, Avalon, 1958.
  - "The Deadly Dust" (as William Fitzgerald), Thrilling Wonder, August 1947
  - "The Gregory Circle" (as William Fitzgerald), Thrilling Wonder, April 1947
  - "The Nameless Something" (as William Fitzgerald), Thrilling Wonder, June 1947
- Monsters and Such, Avon, 1959.
  - "The Castaway", Argosy, September 1946
  - "De Profundis", Thrilling Wonder, Winter 1945
  - "If You Was a Moklin", Galaxy, September 1951
  - "The Lonely Planet", Thrilling Wonder, December 1949
  - "Nobody Saw the Ship", Future, May–June 1950
  - "Proxima Centauri", Astounding, March 1935
  - "The Trans-Human", Science Fiction Plus, December 1953
- Twists in Time, Avon, 1960.
  - "Rogue Star", first publication
  - "Dear Charles", Fantastic, May 1953
  - "Dead City", Thrilling Wonder, Summer 1946 as "Malignant Marauder"
  - "Sam, This Is You", Galaxy, May 1955
  - "The Other Now", Galaxy, March 1951
  - "The Fourth-Dimensional Demonstrator", Astounding, December 1935
  - "The End", Thrilling Wonder, December 1946
- The Aliens, Berkley, March 1960.
  - "The Aliens", Astounding, August 1959
  - "Fugitive From Space", Amazing, May 1954
  - "Anthopological Note", Fantasy and Science Fiction, April 1957
  - "The Skit-Tree Planet", Thrilling Wonder, April 1947 as "Skit-Tree Planet"
  - "Thing from the Sky", first publication
- Doctor to the Stars, Pyramid, March 1964.
  - "The Grandfathers' War", Astounding, October 1957
  - "Med Ship Man", Galaxy, October 1963
  - "Tallien Three", Analog, August 1963 as "The Hate Disease"
- S.O.S. from Three Worlds, Ace, 1966.
  - "Plague on Kryder II", Analog, December 1964
  - "Ribbon in the Sky", Astounding, June 1957
  - "Quarantine World", Analog, November 1966
- Get Off My World!, Belmont, April 1966.
  - "Second Landing", Thrilling Wonder, Winter 1954
  - "White Spot", Startling, Summer 1955
  - "Planet of Sand", Famous Fantastic Mysteries, February 1948
- Explorers of Space, edited by Robert Silverberg, Thomas Nelson, Inc., 1975
  - "Exploration Team", 1956
- The Best of Murray Leinster, edited by Brian Davis, Corgi, 1976.
  - "Time to Die", Astounding, January 1947
  - "The Ethical Equations", Astounding, June 1945
  - "Symbiosis", Collier's, June 14, 1947
  - "Interference", Astounding, October 1945
  - "De Profundis", Thrilling Wonder, Winter 1945
  - "Pipeline to Pluto", Astounding, August 1945
  - "Sam, This Is You", Galaxy, May 1955
  - "The Devil of East Lupton", Thrilling Wonder, August 1948 as "The Devil of East Lupton, Vermont"
  - "Scrimshaw", Astounding, September 1955
  - "If You Was a Moklin", Galaxy, September 1951
- The Best of Murray Leinster, edited by John J. Pierce, Del Rey, April 1978.
  - "Sidewise in Time", Astounding, June 1934
  - "Proxima Centauri", Astounding, March 1935
  - "The Fourth-Dimensional Demonstrator", Astounding, December 1935
  - "First Contact", Astounding, May 1945
  - "The Ethical Equations", Astounding, June 1945
  - "Pipeline to Pluto", Astounding, August 1945
  - "The Power", Astounding, September 1945
  - "A Logic Named Joe" (as Will F. Jenkins), Astounding, March 1946
  - "Symbiosis", Collier's, June 14, 1947
  - "The Strange Case of John Kingman", Astounding, May 1948
  - "The Lonely Planet", Thrilling Wonder, December 1949
  - "Keyhole", Thrilling Wonder, December 1951
  - "Critical Difference", Astounding, July 1956 (also known as "Solar Constant")
- The Med Series, Ace, May 1983.
  - "The Mutant Weapon", Astounding, August 1957 as "Med Service"
  - "Plague on Kryder II", Analog, December 1964
  - "Ribbon in the Sky", Astounding, June 1957
  - "Quarantine World", Analog, November 1966
  - "This World is Taboo", Amazing, July 1961 as "Pariah Planet"
- First Contacts: The Essential Murray Leinster, edited by Joe Rico, NESFA, 1998.
  - "A Logic Named Joe" (as Will F. Jenkins), Astounding, March 1946
  - "If You Was a Moklin", Galaxy, September 1951
  - "The Ethical Equations", Astounding, June 1945
  - "Keyhole", Thrilling Wonder, December 1951
  - "Doomsday Deferred", The Saturday Evening Post, September 24, 1949
  - "First Contact", Astounding, May 1945
  - "Nobody Saw the Ship", Future, May–June 1950
  - "Pipeline to Pluto", Astounding, August 1945
  - "The Lonely Planet", Thrilling Wonder, December 1949
  - "De Profundis", Thrilling Wonder, Winter 1945
  - "The Power", Astounding, September 1945
  - "The Castaway", Argosy, September 1946
  - "The Strange Case of John Kingman", Astounding, May 1948
  - "Proxima Centauri", Astounding, March 1935
  - "The Fourth-Dimensional Demonstrator", Astounding, December 1935
  - "Sam, This Is You", Galaxy, May 1955
  - "Sidewise in Time", Astounding, June 1934
  - "Scrimshaw", Astounding, September 1955
  - "Symbiosis", Collier's, June 14, 1947
  - "Cure for Ylith", Startling Stories, November 1949
  - "Plague on Kryder II", Analog, December 1964
  - "Exploration Team", Astounding, March 1956 (also known as "Combat Team")
  - "The Great Catastrophe", first publication
  - "To All Fat Policemen", first publication
- Med Ship, edited by Eric Flint and Guy Gordon, Baen, June 2002.
  - "Med Ship Man", Galaxy, October 1963
  - "Plague on Kryder II", Analog, December 1964
  - "The Mutant Weapon", Astounding, August 1957 as "Med Service"
  - "Ribbon in the Sky", Astounding, June 1957
  - "Tallien Three", Analog, August 1963 as "The Hate Disease"
  - "Quarantine World", Analog, November 1966
  - "The Grandfathers' War", Astounding, October 1957
  - "Pariah Planet", Amazing, July 1961 (also known as This World is Taboo)
- Planets of Adventure, edited by Eric Flint and Guy Gordon, Baen, October 2003.
  - The Forgotten Planet
    - "The Mad Planet", Argosy, June 12, 1920
    - "The Red Dust", Argosy, April 2, 1921
    - "Nightmare Planet", Argosy, June 12, 1952
  - The Planet Explorer (also known as Colonial Survey)
    - "Solar Constant", Astounding, July 1956 as "Critical Difference"
    - "Sand Doom", Astounding, December 1955
    - "Combat Team", Astounding, March 1956 as "Exploration Team"
    - "The Swamp Was Upside Down", Astounding, September 1956
  - "Anthopological Note", Fantasy and Science Fiction, April 1957
  - "Scrimshaw", Astounding, September 1955
  - "Assignment on Pasik", Thrilling Wonder, February 1949
  - "Regulations", Thrilling Wonder, August 1948
  - "The Skit-Tree Planet", Thrilling Wonder, April 1947 as "Skit-Tree Planet"
- A Logic Named Joe, edited by Eric Flint and Guy Gordon, Baen, June 2005.
  - "A Logic Named Joe" (as Will F. Jenkins), Astounding, March 1946
  - "Dear Charles", Fantastic, May 1953
  - Gateway to Elsewhere, Ace, 1954; first appeared as "Journey to Barkut" in Startling, January 1952.
  - The Duplicators, Ace, 1964; first appeared as "Lord of the Uffts" in Worlds of Tomorrow, February 1964.
  - "The Fourth-Dimensional Demonstrator", Astounding, December 1935
  - The Pirates of Zan, Ace, 1959; first serialized as The Pirates of Ersatz in Astounding, February - April 1959.
- The Runaway Skyscraper and Other Tales from the Pulps, Wildside Press, August 2007.
  - "The Runaway Skyscraper", Argosy, February 22, 1919
  - "The Gallery Gods", Argosy, August 21, 1920
  - "The Street of Magnificent Dreams", Argosy, August 5, 1922
  - "Nerve", Argosy, June 4, 1921
  - "Stories of the Hungry Country: The Case of the Dona Clotilde"
  - "Morale", Astounding, December 1931
  - "Grooves", Argosy, October 12, 1918
  - "Footprints in the Snow", All Story Weekly, June 7, 1919

=== Other short stories ===
- "The Invaders", Amazing Stories, April–May 1953
- "Doctor", Galaxy, February 1961
