= The Best Science Fiction Stories and Novels: 1955 =

- First edition
- Author: edited by T. E. Dikty
- Language: English
- Genre: Science fiction
- Publisher: Frederick Fell
- Publication date: 1955
- Publication place: United States
- Media type: Print (hardback)
- Pages: 544 pp

The Best Science Fiction Stories and Novels: 1955 is a 1955 anthology of science fiction short stories edited by T. E. Dikty. Most of the stories had originally appeared in 1954 in the magazines Astounding, The Saturday Evening Post, Fantasy and Science Fiction, Amazing Stories, Science Stories, Galaxy Science Fiction, Imagination and Fantastic.

== Contents ==
- The Science-Fiction Year, by T. E. Dikty
- The Cold Equations, by Tom Godwin
- "Of Course", by Chad Oliver
- "Dominions Beyond", by Ward Moore
- "Guilty as Charged", by Arthur Porges
- "Careless Love", by Albert C. Friborg
- "Memento Homo", by Walter M. Miller, Jr.
- "Mousetrap", by Andre Norton
- "Christmas Trombone", by Raymond E. Banks
- "One Thousand Miles Up", by Frank M. Robinson
- "How-2", by Clifford D. Simak
- "Heirs Apparent", by Robert Abernathy
- "John’s Other Practice", by Winston K. Marks
- "The Inner Worlds", by William Morrison
- "The Will", by Walter M. Miller, Jr.
- "Felony", by James Causey
- "The Littlest People", by Raymond E. Banks
- "One Way Street", by Jerome Bixby
- "Axolotl", by Robert Abernathy
- "Exile", by Everett B. Cole
- "Nightmare Blues", by Frank Herbert
- The Science-Fiction Book Index, by Earl Kemp
