= Peter Tuesday Hughes =

American novelist

- Died: c. 2005
- Occupation: Travel agent
- Writing career
- Genres: Science fiction, mystery
- Notable work: Bruce Doe series

Peter Tuesday Hughes was an American science fiction and mystery author. He was an early exponent of the "gay gothic" subgenre. Though published primarily by Greenleaf Classics, a firm known for insisting that its authors include graphic sex in their works, his novels "[depict] gay relationships with a depth surprising for the markets he published for." However, some of his contemporaries objected to the pessimism Hughes occasionally expressed.

He was the creator of fictional detective Bruce Doe, who featured in six mystery novels that are now considered to "have an unexpected resonance in a post-9/11 world." In 2013, the Bruce Doe novels were named one of the ten best gay mystery series by the Lambda Literary Review.

A San Francisco travel agent, Hughes briefly partnered with fellow authors Dirk Vanden, Phil Andros, Richard Amory, Larry Townsend, and Douglas Dean in an attempt to found the first all-gay publishing company, which was to be called The Renaissance Group. The group was unable to secure funding for the attempt and several of its members ceased publishing shortly thereafter.

He died around 2005.

== Bibliography ==
- The Other Party (1968), political novel
- Come With Me (1969)
- Gay Nights at Maldelangue (1969), gothic romance
- Groping (1969), action thriller
- Seventeen-69 (1970), political thriller
- The Good Boy (1970), mystery
- A Walk in the Park (1971), sexual escapade
- Graffiti (1971), short stories
- Remake (1971), science fiction
- Strangers Can See You in My Face (1971), crime novel
- The Third Secret (1971), gothic crime novel
- The Mirror Chronicles (1971)
- Alien (1972), science fiction
- I Am Dying, Egypt (1972)
- Something in the Blood (1972), mythological mystery
- Spin the Boy Down (1972)
- Tangier 6-6969 (1972), political thriller
- The Big Blow (1972)
- A Boy in the Night (1973)
- Stud Hung (1973)
- Macho Man (1975)
- The Bright Young Men (1976), Bruce Doe #1
- Three Got Away (1976), Bruce Doe #2
- The Wisteria Club (1976), historical romance
- Garden of Cruel Delights (1977)
- Master of Monfortin (1977), gothic romance
- The Amir's Harem (1977)
- The Daemon (1977), supernatural thriller
- The Eyes of the Basilisk (1977), Bruce Doe #3
- The Executioner (1977), Bruce Doe #4
- The Monte Carlo Caper (1977), Bruce Doe #5
- The Phallic Worshipers (1977), mystery
- Hard to Shoot (1978), Bruce Doe #6

== See also ==
- Gay pulp fiction
