= The Best Science Fiction Stories: 1952 =

Science fiction anthology

- Dust-jacket from the first edition
- Editors: Everett F. Bleiler and T. E. Dikty
- Language: English
- Genre: Science fiction
- Publisher: Fredrick Fell
- Publication date: 1952
- Publication place: United States
- Media type: Print (hardback)
- Pages: 347
- Preceded by: The Best Science Fiction Stories: 1951
- Followed by: The Best Science Fiction Stories: 1953

The Best Science Fiction Stories: 1952 is a 1952 anthology of science fiction short stories edited by Everett F. Bleiler and T. E. Dikty. An abridged edition was published in the UK by Grayson in 1953 under the title The Best Science Fiction Stories: Third Series. The stories had originally appeared in 1951 and 1952 in the magazines Super Science Stories, Fantasy and Science Fiction, Galaxy Science Fiction, Worlds Beyond, Startling Stories, New Worlds, Marvel Science Fiction, Esquire, Man’s World and Suspense Magazine.

== Contents ==
- Introduction, by Everett F. Bleiler & T. E. Dikty
- "The Other Side", by Walter Kubilius
- "Of Time and Third Avenue", by Alfred Bester
- "The Marching Morons", by Cyril Kornbluth
- "A Peculiar People", by Betsy Curtis
- "Extending the Holdings", by David Grinnell
- "The Tourist Trade", by Wilson Tucker
- "The Two Shadows", by William F. Temple
- "Balance", by John Christopher
- "Brightness Falls from the Air", by Idris Seabright
- "Witch War", by Richard Matheson
- "At No Extra Cost", by Peter Phillips
- "Nine-Finger Jack", by Anthony Boucher
- "Appointment in Tomorrow", by Fritz Leiber
- "The Rats", by Arthur Porges
- "Men of the Ten Books", by Jack Vance
- "Generation of Noah", by William Tenn
- "Dark Interlude", by Fredric Brown & Mack Reynolds
- "The Pedestrian", by Ray Bradbury
- About the Authors

== Sources ==
- Contento, William G. "Index to Science Fiction Anthologies and Collections". Archived from the original on 2008-01-04.
