= Bells of Doom =

Bells of Doom may refer to:

- Bells of Doom (album), by Therion, 2001
- "Bells of DOOM", a song by MF Doom from the 2009 album Unexpected Guests
- Bells of Doom, a 1935 novel featuring The Shadow by Walter B. Gibson
- "The Bells of Doom", a Sexton Blake story by Donald Stuart, 1936
