= Every Boy's Book of Outer Space Stories =

Book by T. E. Dikty

Every Boy’s Book of Outer Space Stories
- Editor: T. E. Dikty
- Language: English
- Genre: Science fiction Short stories
- Publisher: Fredrick Fell
- Publication date: 1960
- Publication place: United States
- Media type: Print (hardback)
- Pages: 283 pp

Every Boy’s Book of Outer Space Stories is a 1960 anthology of science fiction short stories edited by T. E. Dikty and published by Fredrick Fell. Most of the stories had originally appeared in the magazines Astounding, Thrilling Wonder Stories and Galaxy Science Fiction.

== Contents ==
- "And a Star to Steer Her By", by Lee Correy
- "Sitting Duck", by Oliver E. Saari
- "Blind Man’s Buff", by Malcolm Jameson
- "Gypsy", by Poul Anderson
- "The Canal Builders", by Robert Abernathy
- "Star of Wonder", by Julian May
- "The Reluctant Heroes", by Frank M. Robinson
- "That Share of Glory", by C. M. Kornbluth
- "Men Against the Stars", by Manly Wade Wellman
- "Man in the Sky", by Algis Budrys
- "A Rover I Will Be", by Robert Courtney & Frank M. Robinson
