= Year's Best Science Fiction Novels: 1954 =

1954 anthology edited by E. F. Bleiler and T. E. Dikty

- First edition
- Editors: E. F. Bleiler and T. E. Dikty
- Language: English
- Genre: Science fiction
- Publisher: Frederick Fell
- Publication date: 1954
- Publication place: United States
- Media type: Print (hardback)
- Pages: 331
- Preceded by: Year's Best Science Fiction Novels: 1953

Year's Best Science Fiction Novels: 1954 is a 1954 anthology of science fiction novellas edited by E. F. Bleiler and T. E. Dikty. An abridged edition was published in the UK by Grayson in 1955 under the title The Year's Best Science Fiction Novels: Second Series. The stories had originally appeared in 1953 and 1954 in the magazines Amazing Stories, Thrilling Wonder Stories, Science Stories, Galaxy Science Fiction and Space Science Fiction.

== Contents ==
- Introduction, by Everett F. Bleiler & T. E. Dikty
- "The Enormous Room", by H. L. Gold & Robert Krepps
- "Assignment in Aldebaran", by Kendell Foster Crossen
- "The Oceans Are Wide", by Frank M. Robinson
- "The Sentimentalists", by Murray Leinster
- "Second Variety", by Philip K. Dick

== Reception ==
P. Schuyler Miller reported that the editors' choices here were "by no means up to the very high standards of their annual short-story anthologies," although he rated the Robinson and Dick stories highly.
