= Humanitas Prize =

- Awarded for: Film and television exploring the human condition in a nuanced and meaningful way.
- Country: United States
- First award: 1975
- Website: www.humanitasprize.org

The Humanitas Prize is an American award for film and television writing, presented to writers whose work explores the human condition in a nuanced and meaningful manner. It began in 1974 with Father Ellwood "Bud" Kieser—also the founder of Paulist Productions—but is generally not seen as specifically directed toward religious cinema or TV. The prize is distinguished from similar honors for screenwriters in that a cash award, ranging from $10,000 to $25,000, accompanies each prize. Journalist Barbara Walters once said, "What the Nobel Prize is to literature and the Pulitzer Prize is to journalism, the Humanitas Prize has become to American television."

The Humanitas Prizes are presented annually by the nonprofit organization Humanitas, which also operates a range of other programs, including the New Voices Fellowship, the Humanitas College Screenwriting Awards, and other public event programming.

== History ==
Kieser founded the Human Family Educational and Cultural Institute (dba Humanitas) in 1974 to present the award. Beginning as primarily a television award, the first Humanitas Prize winners were announced on the Today Show. Kieser, Ray Bradbury, and Robert Abernathy announced the first winners in 1975. At that time, the awards were divided into three categories, based on program length (30, 60, or 90 minutes and longer); these lengths tend to correspond to comedies, dramas, and telefilms or miniseries, to the extent that some articles refer to the categories by those names. The Kieser Award, a lifetime achievement award, was established after Kieser's death in 2000, and Prizes in Drama, Comedy, and Family Feature Film are currently presented.

When establishing the Humanitas Prize, Kieser determined that the writer was the source of the most humanizing values in any program and should therefore be the focus of the awards. Although lists of Humanitas Prize winners for television categories often tell only the name of the program, the award is made to the writers of specific episodes, and more than one episode of a given show may be among the finalists in any given year; similarly, reports on the film categories often give more prominence to the film's title, but the award goes to the writing staff. In 2005, Humanitas winners included Hotel Rwanda (feature film) and The West Wing (television).

In 2006, the documentary film An Inconvenient Truth about global warming starring Al Gore was given a "Special Award" for "mak[ing] a significant contribution to the human family by communicating values, forming consciences and motivating human behavior."

The most wins—four—by any single program were for writers of the TV series M*A*S*H: Larry Gelbart in 1976; Alan Alda (with James Jay Rubinfier) in 1980; and the team of David Pollock and Elias Davis in 1982 and 1983. Several shows won three times, including The West Wing, The Wonder Years, Family, Scrubs, thirtysomething, Hill Street Blues, and I'll Fly Away, which once won in the 60- and 90-minute categories in the same year. Life with Louie was the only show to win three times in the children's animation category.

Writers who have won three times include Aaron Sorkin (for The West Wing and Sports Night), David E. Kelley (Picket Fences, The Practice), David Milch (Hill Street Blues, NYPD Blue) and Marshall Herskovitz (thirtysomething, Once and Again, and the telefilm Special Bulletin). While at least four writers have had back-to-back wins, it is not unusual for several years to pass before one writer wins the prize again. To date, the longest gap was the case of China Beach writer-producer John Sacret Young, who won in 1978 for the telefilm Special Olympics and then won his second Humanitas Prize 21 years later for the TV movie Thanks of a Grateful Nation. (Young eventually went on to become a member of the Humanitas Board of Directors, where he served with at least four other repeat prizewinners.)

While the Humanitas Prize is awarded to the writers of produced work only, Humanitas also supports un-produced screenwriters. Humanitas annually awards two college students with the Carol Mendelsohn College Drama Award and the David and Lynn Angell College Comedy Award. The Angell College Comedy Award was founded after David Angell and his wife, Lynn Angell, were killed in the crash of Flight 11 in the September 11 2001, attacks. In 2010, Humanitas introduced a program called "New Voices." It is designed to help emerging screen and television writers by pairing them with award-winning writers for a one-on-one mentorship.

== See also ==
- List of American television awards
