= Juin =

Juin may refer to:

- Juin is the month of June in French
- Alphonse Juin (1888–1967), Marshal of France
- Hubert Juin (1926 – 1987), a Belgian poet, writer, and literary critic
- Juin Teh (born 1990), a Malaysian host and actress

== See also ==
- Boulevard du 30 Juin, a major street in Kinshasa, Democratic Republic of the Congo
- Juine, a 53-kilometre-long French river
