= Year's Best Science Fiction Novels: 1953 =

1953 anthology edited by E. F. Bleiler and T. E. Dikty

- First edition dust jacket
- Editors: E. F. Bleiler and T. E. Dikty
- Language: English
- Genre: Science fiction
- Published: 1953 (Frederick Fell)
- Publication place: United States
- Media type: Print (hardback)
- Pages: 331
- Preceded by: Year's Best Science Fiction Novels: 1952
- Followed by: Year's Best Science Fiction Novels: 1954

Year's Best Science Fiction Novels: 1953 is a 1953 anthology of science fiction novels and novellas edited by E. F. Bleiler and T. E. Dikty. An abridged edition was published in the UK by The Bodley Head in 1955 under the title Category Phoenix. The stories had originally appeared in 1952 in the magazines Astounding, Galaxy Science Fiction and Thrilling Wonder Stories.

== Contents ==
- Introduction, by Everett F. Bleiler & T. E. Dikty
- "Firewater", by William Tenn
- "Category Phoenix", by Boyd Ellanby
- "Surface Tension", by James Blish
- "The Gadget Had a Ghost", by Murray Leinster
- "Conditionally Human", by Walter M. Miller, Jr.

== Reception ==
P. Schuyler Miller noted that the editors selected stories "for variety as much as 'importance,' literary elegance, or any other such self-conscious quality."
