= City of Shadows =

City of Shadows may refer to:

== Film and television ==
- City of Shadows (1927 film), an American film of 1927
- City of Shadows (1955 film), an American crime film directed by William Witney
- City of Shadows (1987 film), or Nightmare City, a 1987 film with soundtrack by Tangerine Dream
- City of Shadows (2010 film) (French: La Cité), a Canadian drama film
- City of Shadows, 2025 Netflix original programming

== Other uses ==
- City of Shadows, a photographic series by Alexey Titarenko
- City of Shadows, photographic exhibitions and a book by Peter Doyle
- City of Shadows, a 1939 novel by Walter B. Gibson
- City of Shadows, a 2002 novel in the Trap in Time Trilogy by Celia Rees
- City of Shadows, a 2006 novel by Diana Norman as Ariana Franklin
- The City of Shadows: A Romance of Morocco, a 1911 novel by Charles Beadle
