= Rock Diver =

1951 science fiction short story by Harry Harrison

- Short story by Harry Harrison
- Country: United States
- Language: English
- Genre(s): Science fiction

Publication
- Published in: Worlds Beyond
- Publication type: Periodical
- Publisher: Hillman Periodicals
- Media type: Print (Magazine, Paperback)
- Publication date: February 1951

"Rock Diver" is a 1951 short story by American science fiction writer Harry Harrison. It was his first published story, and it is credited with popularizing the concept of matter penetration. The plot reworks a classic western plot about claim jumpers with a sci-fi twist.

== Development ==
The story was published in the February 1951 issue of Worlds Beyond magazine. Harrison initially titled the story "I Walk Through Rocks", the title was changed by the magazine editor Damon Knight, who bought it from Harrison; around the same time it was also bought by Frederik Pohl for his anthology Beyond the End of Time, which was published in 1952. The story marks Harrison's literary debut; he was previously an illustrator (he also created an illustration for this story). Harrison wrote the story during an illness that prevented him from working on graphics, and found the endeavour much more profitable than illustrating (Knight and Pohl paid Harrison 50 dollars for the story; some sources quote the sum of 100 or 150 dollars - which was more than what he earned for illustrations, which generally were sold for several dollars apiece).

The story was reprinted in anthologies and translated into other languages (including several times in Polish, with the first translation in 1958; and Russian in 1971).

== Plot summary ==
The leitmotif of the story is a journey to the center of the Earth in search of valuable raw materials through the use of technology allowing penetrating or passing through matter. Harrison wrote that he based the story's outline on a classic Western plot and the idea of claim jumping, but repackaged it with a sci-fi setting.

== Analysis and reception ==
The story was one of the early science-fiction works describing the effect of penetrating or passing through matter although Harrison himself admitted that the idea for such a device was not his and he was inspired by prior science fiction works. Algis Budrys in 1967 in the context of the anthology Science Fiction Inventions, where the story was reprinted, wrote that it was "a real landmark SF story, in the special sense that each of them either originated or first fruited a basic technological idea in such a happy combination with story values that it is impossible to touch that idea again without having to find some totally new framework for it”. Likewise, in 1985 Jerry Pournelle noted that the story "had the kind of idea that immediately engages the SF addict". Brian Stableford listed it as one of "notable accounts of burrowing expeditions" into Earth that are relatively consistent with the knowledge of modern geology.

A reviewer for Analog Science Fiction and Fact wrote in 1969 that it is "highly realistic yarn about prospecting and claim-jumping inside the Earth. This could be the ultimate development of the old gimmick of the man who can walk through walls."

Lech Jęczmyk wrote that many consider this to be Harrison's best story, due to the original idea ("not the cosmos, not the ocean, but the earth's crust as an area of conquest") and the story itself being "an engaging drama".
