= Year's Best Science Fiction Novels: 1952 =

1952 anthology edited by E. F. Bleiler and T. E. Dikty

- First edition.
- Editors: E. F. Bleiler and T. E. Dikty
- Language: English
- Genre: Science fiction
- Publisher: Frederick Fell
- Publication date: 1952
- Publication place: United States
- Media type: Print (hardback)
- Pages: 331
- Followed by: Year's Best Science Fiction Novels: 1953

Year's Best Science Fiction Novels: 1952 is a 1952 anthology of science fiction novels and novellas edited by E. F. Bleiler and T. E. Dikty. An abridged edition was published in the UK by Grayson in 1954 under the title The Year's Best Science Fiction Novels. The stories had originally appeared in 1951 in the magazines Astounding, Super Science Stories and Two Complete Science-Adventure Books.

== Contents ==
- Introduction, by Everett F. Bleiler & T. E. Dikty
- "Izzard and the Membrane", by Walter M. Miller, Jr.
- "...And Then There Were None", by Eric Frank Russell
- "Flight to Forever", by Poul Anderson
- "The Hunting Season", by Frank M. Robinson
- "Seeker of the Sphinx", by Arthur C. Clarke

== Reception ==
P. Schuyler Miller described the contents as "five varied and generally good middle-length stories not long enough to become books."

== Sources ==
- Contento, William G. "Index to Science Fiction Anthologies and Collections". Archived from the original on 2008-01-06.
