= Science Fiction Inventions =

Book by Damon Knight

- First edition cover
- Author: Damon Knight (editor)
- Cover artist: Hoot von Zitzewitz
- Language: English
- Genre: Science fiction
- Published: 1967 Lancer Books
- Publication place: United States
- Media type: Print (paperback)
- Pages: 256

Science Fiction Inventions is a reprint anthology of science fiction stories, edited by Damon Knight and published by Lancer Books as an original paperback in 1967.

== Contents ==
- "Introduction", Damon Knight
- "No, No, Not Rogov!", Cordwainer Smith (If 1959)
- "Rock Diver", Harry Harrison (Worlds Beyond 1951)
- "Private Eye", Henry Kuttner & C. L. Moore (Astounding 1949)
- "The Snowball Effect", Katherine MacLean (Galaxy 1952)
- "The Chromium Helmet", Theodore Sturgeon (Astounding 1946)
- "Employment", L. Sprague de Camp (Astounding 1939)
- "Dreaming Is a Private Thing", Isaac Asimov (F&SF 1955)
- "Invariant", John R. Pierce (Astounding 1944)
- "Hunting Machine", Carol Emshwiller (Science Fiction Stories 1957)
- "Committee of the Whole", Frank Herbert (Galaxy 1965)

"Private Eye" was originally published under the Lewis Padgett byline. "Employment" was originally credited to Lyman R. Lyon.

== Reception ==
Algis Budrys praised Science Fiction Inventions as "an excellent book," saying that almost every one of the stories included was "a real landmark sf story, in the especial sense that each of them either originated or first fruited a basic technological idea in such a happy combination with story values that it is impossible to touch that idea again without having to find some totally new framework for it."

The Hartford Courant found the anthology "a collection of short stories by the masters of the genre, providing a comparison of [their] methods."
