= And a Star to Steer Her By =

Short story by G. Harry Stine

"And A Star to Steer Her By"
- Short story by G. Harry Stine (as Lee Correy)
- Country: United States
- Language: English
- Genre: Science fiction

Publication
- Published in: Astounding Science Fiction
- Publication type: Periodical
- Publisher: Street & Smith
- Media type: Print (Magazine)
- Publication date: 1953

"And a Star to Steer Her By" is a science fiction short story by American writer G. Harry Stine, originally published, under the name Lee Correy, in the June 1953 issue of Astounding Science Fiction. It was later published in Every Boy's Book of Outer Space Stories. The title comes from a line in John Masefield's poem Sea-Fever.

== Plot summary ==
Rod Garver is a 35-year-old spaceman who has just lost his left hand and had it replaced with an artificial one. Unfortunately, he can no longer work as a jet man on rockets because his new hand isn't strong enough, and must be left behind on the planet Mars in the spaceport of Canalopolis. His ship, the Timurlane heads on to Jupiter's moon Ganymede, while he attempts to return to Terra.

He spends several months waiting around in the bars spacemen frequent, including the club for the League of Free Traders, hoping to find a captain willing to hire him for a return trip to Terra. The Fafnir, an aging cargo ship, makes an emergency landing near Canalopolis after its jet man is killed when a machine in his power room explodes. The Dutch captain, Vanderhoff, offers Garver the open post, on a run back to Terra. Despite some misgivings about serving on a ship in such disrepair, Garver accepts and after several weeks of repairing Fafnir, they depart—along with the electronics man, Winchell 'Winch' Astrabadi, an Arab 'Moslem' with a New York accent and his cat, Cosmo. During the nine month flight, Garver decides he will open a restaurant catering to the tastes of spacemen, as he isn't ready to retire. The three men get to know each other and enjoy watching Cosmo, who, like most cats, has adapted well to zero-g life. Arriving at Terra, they land at White Sands, New Mexico, with only a minor mechanical incident. Garver departs to open a spaceman-oriented bar and grill, Vanderhoff puts the Fafnir up for sale as scrape and Winch takes a job on a shuttle to and from Luna.

Garver's business is successful, but he yearns for the life of a spaceman. He meets Harvey Bernotte, a young southerner from a Venusian farm, who was just beginning as a spaceman when he was temporarily black-listed and is currently grounded on Terra. Now Harvey isn't sure if he wants to be a spaceman. Garver gives Harvey a job as a bartender, and Garver's old captain, Tomaszewski, returns to Terra and the two share news. Garver realizes he still wants to be a spaceman and convinces Vanderhoff to sell him the Fafnir in exchange for half ownership of the restaurant. Vanderhoff reveals he never put the Fafnir up for sale because he knew Garver wouldn't be able to resist the life of a spaceman. Garver, Winch and Harvey set off for Venus, but Vanderhoff and Garver observe that some people are born to be spacemen and there is nothing they can do to change that. They agree that Harvey is like Garver and will also eventually realize that he too belongs in space.

The story closes with:

"In every age, in every time, there have been those who are not content to settle down. They miss the kick of the wheel, the wail of the wind in the rigging, the exotic sights and smells of a harbor half across the world, the roar of engines cutting through the slipstream, and the powerful, body-shaking thunder of the jets. It is to these restless men with the wanderlust that the human race owes a priceless debt as the wanderers push the horizons out to the stars -- "

== Politics ==
The world of the story seems to have a largely anarchic or libertarian political system. Most of the people seem to live with little government control. Some kind of unified economy exists, because the traders flying to Earth from other planets and then back out have to deal with fluctuating market prices that can cause the cargo they carry to lose its worth by the time they reach their market. There are organisations created by civilians, including the League of Free Traders, a guild of some sort with clubs on different planets. The civilization is advanced, but appears to have taken on some aspects of a frontier society. It is unclear if each planet has its own government, but some central government still has control over all planets. When the Fafnir lands on Earth, decommissioned and then put up for sale as scrap, the decommissioning process involves the Bureau of Space Commerce (BSC) removing the "bricks of fissionable material from her atomic pile." So some government oversight still exists to monitor and regulate certain dangerous substances. The story does not have the feel of a 'wild west,' but it does seem to be a capitalist libertarian utopia, where there are understood codes of conduct and everyone acts in a law-abiding manner—only without any evidence of laws or law-enforcement. Capitalist because all of the characters have jobs or are looking for something to do. A Utopia because everyone seems to be treated equally and different races have mixed and coexist peacefully.

The audience is probably meant to be boys, because there are no female characters, and the setting and plot (space and space travel) deal with subjects appealing to young boys, especially of the 1950s. The opening and closing paragraphs could be seen as specific encouragement for youths reading the story to become explorers and general encouragement to follow their dreams.
