= The Man from C.A.M.P. =

1960s gay book series

- Cover of 1966 paperback The Man from C.A.M.P., authored by Don Holliday. Art by Robert Bonfils.
- The Man from C.A.M.P. (1966); Color Him Gay (1966); The Watercress File (1966); The Son Goes Down (1966); Gothic Gaye (1966); Holiday Gay (1967); Rally Round the Fag (1967); The Gay Dogs (1967); Blow the Man Down (1968)
- Author: Don Holliday
- Country: United States
- Language: English
- Genre: Spy fiction Gay pulp
- Publisher: Greenleaf Classics
- Published: 1966–1968
- Media type: Print (paperback)

The Man from C.A.M.P. is a series of ten gay pulp fiction novels published under the pseudonym of Don Holliday. The original nine were written by Victor J. Banis between 1966 and 1968; a tenth by an uncertain author appeared in 1971. The series first emerged during a period when gay paperback titles began spoofing popular genre fiction. As such, they are part of the great gay paperback explosion that "catered to most every taste in men's genre fiction," including detective stories and spy thrillers. According to Banis, the series was inspired by the characters Batman and Robin, and is a spoof of the James Bond series and the television show The Man from U.N.C.L.E.

The series is significant because it offers the first positive portrayal of a gay secret agent in fiction, Jackie Holmes.

== Series introduction ==
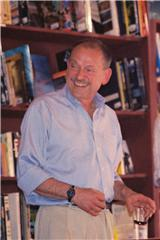
Victor J. Banis, author of The Man from C.A.M.P.

C.A.M.P., whose name references the camp aesthetic, is described as "an underground organization dedicated to the protection and advancement of homosexuals." C.A.M.P. works in coordination with law enforcement agencies around the globe, including INTERPOL. The meaning of the acronym C.A.M.P. is never given, but the series' protagonist, Jackie Holmes, a gay, seductive and capable international secret agent, allows that "the C might stand for sucker." The general formula for each book involves Jackie being paired up with a homophobic government agent to investigate a suspicious crime. After any number of twists and turns, Jackie solves the mystery and seduces the formerly homophobic agent. C.A.M.P.'s archenemy organization is B.U.T.C.H. (Brothers United to Crush Homosexuality) headed by the infamous Tiger Bey.

The Man from C.A.M.P. books were written quickly without significant editing, and sometimes were not published as written. As such, the original printings contain a number of typos and scenes reused from other works in the series. In the two recent compilations, the redundant scenes have been removed. The recent compilations are significant because the original copies, by virtue of their obvious sexual orientation, were often disposed of or destroyed so that they would not reveal clues about their owners and their lives. Robert Bonfils produced the paperback cover art for all the novels in the series, except Gothic Gaye, the cover of which was illustrated by Darryl Milsap.

== Recurring characters ==
Jackie Holmes, on the cover of Rally Round the Fag. Cover art by Robert Bonfils

Jackie Holmes
Jackie is a witty, handsome and fabulous gay superspy sporting blond hair and a slight build with amazing strength and agility. Jackie is an even-keeled and capable detective with a strong libido, which comes in handy for gathering clues and seducing his more straight-laced crime fighting partners. He says, "I use sex as another weapon when I'm working." Jackie occasionally appears in drag as a disguise and often has an obscure talent or gadget to get out of tight spots. Jackie is a millionaire who collects and repairs vintage automobiles; he also has a white poodle named Sophie who is trained to kill with her razor sharp teeth (the depiction of the character was not influenced by the porn star John Holmes, who did not begin his film career until later in the decade).

Lou Upton
Lou is an INTERPOL representative in his 40s who is, by all appearances, heterosexual. Lou acts as a primary contact who works to interest Jackie in potential crime cases. Lou introduces various government-based law enforcement members and assigns them to work on cases with Jackie Holmes.

Rich
Rich is a 6-foot 5 inch tall man, rugged and built like a bull. He looks out for Jackie's interest by running the local C.A.M.P. office and providing, at the least, administrative assistance in Jackie's cases. Rich and Jackie have sexual relations, but the romantic aspect is mutually "held at arms length" due to the demanding and dangerous nature of Jackie's spy work.

== Original books ==
The Man from C.A.M.P. series includes nine original books written by Victor J. Banis and published by Greenleaf Classics under their Leisure Books, Companion Books, Ember Library, and Late Hour Library brands.

1. The Man from C.A.M.P. (1966): Lou Upton pairs Jackie with the U.S. Treasury Department investigator Ted Summers to foil a Los Angeles gang of gays headed by the lesbian Big Daddy, who are counterfeiting diamonds that are so fine even experts are fooled.
2. Color Him Gay (1966): Jackie fights B.U.T.C.H. in Los Angeles and San Francisco, when it seeks to blackmail the closeted British rock superstar Dingo Stark.
3. The Watercress File (1966): After Jackie and Treasury Agent Rex Winter's initial effort to uncover the international criminal organization Butterfly fails, Jackie is summoned by his Aunt Lily to Washington, D.C., where he teams up with CIA agent Craig Mathews, his aunts and a male cousin (who form W.A.T.E.R.C.R.E.S.S., Women Acting Together, Enlightened, Righteous, Courageous, Responsible, Enterprising, Strong and Sensible) to stop an assassination plot.
4. The Son Goes Down (1966): Working with Irish agent Jerry Shannon to stop a ring kidnapping blond teenage American boys who are fans of the dead actor Dean James, Jackie heads to Tijuana and Lisbon, accompanied by the adopted son of an old friend, a male-to-female transsexual.
5. Gothic Gaye (1966): After Jackie falls in love with Baron Max von der Gout and leaves C.A.M.P. in order to live with him in the supposedly haunted Castle Gaye, B.U.T.C.H. makes various attempts on his life; at Rich's instigation Summers, Stark, Matthews, and Shannon show up to help.
6. Holiday Gay (1967): During the Christmas season the Swallows, a gang of midgets under the direction of Birdie Wing, engages in a series of jewel heists before Jackie and an unexpected white-bearded gentleman dressed in a lavender suit stops them cold.
7. Rally Round the Fag (1967): Jackie is called upon to impersonate a female double agent who has become part of a plot to begin World War III; the case leads him to Stockholm, where he dallies with Swedish agent Sven and Russian agent Boris, and for a brief moment to Spain, where he has to put his bullfighting skills to the test.
8. The Gay Dogs (1967): A vicious gang under the leadership of the dominatrix Anna Lingus dognaps Lady Agatha's Yorkshire Terrier, causing Jackie chivalrously to go to the rescue.
9. Blow the Man Down (1968): When Atlantic ships start disappearing just before a Summit Cruise, Lou Upton calls on Jackie and U.S. Agent Andy Parks for help; they are sucked into the domed city of Atlantis, ruled by the emperor Machas Fruche, a.k.a. Mother Schmucker, where Jackie's musical skills save the day.

== Spinoffs ==
In addition to the nine original books written by Victor J. Banis, three related texts by Elbert Barrow, a.k.a. "Lady Agatha," in which Banis had only partly a hand, a 10th novel, Gay-Safe (probably by Samuel Dodson, according to researcher Lynn Munroe), and a short story have appeared.

1. Sex and the Single Gay by Jackie Holmes, That Man from C.A.M.P. as told to Don Holliday (1967): one of the first gay self-help guides to appear.
2. The C.A.M.P. Guide to Astrology by Lady Agatha and Jackie Holmes, as told to Don Holliday (1967).
3. The C.A.M.P. Cookbook by Lady Agatha in conspiracy with Don Holliday (1968).
4. Gay-Safe (1971): Jackie suspects B.U.T.C.H. is behind the death of Dr. Perry Robert, a founder of the Church of the Homosexual Community; LAPD Detective Tom Lattimer and Agent Andy Parks show up to help.
5. "Jackie Returns" (2007): In an original short story by Victor J. Banis, Jackie's cousin Jamie appears to lure him out of retirement.
6. "Love Sucks" (2010): In an original short story, Jackie goes on a dinner date with a potential monster.

A spin-off series is in development, Agents of C.A.M.P., on behalf of the Victor J. Banis Family Foundation. The series will begin with The Golden Doppelbangers, being written by the project lead, Lauren Fox.

== Related works ==
In 1965 in the newsletter of the Philadelphia homophile organization Janus Society, Allen J. Shapiro, writing as A. Jay, began a comic strip The Adventures of Harry Chess: That Man from A.U.N.T.I.E. (Agents Undercover Network To Investigate Evil). The early strips were collected in The Uncensored Adventures of Harry Chess 0068 7/8: That Man from A.U.N.T.I.E. (1966). Later Harry Chess joined FUGG (Federal Undercover Gay Goodguys); most of the episodes were re-published in the Meatmen comic anthologies published by Winston Leyland out of San Francisco.

The Man from Pansy, a novel very similar to The Man from C.A.M.P., appeared in 1967 and is the first in a short series of three gay-oriented pulp fiction novels written by Don Rico. The series' protagonist is hip secret agent Buzz Cardigan who plays gay to infiltrate an underworld of crime and blackmail. The second book in the series is The Daisy Dilemma, also published in 1967, the third is The Passion Flower Puzzle, 1968.

== See also ==
- The Man from O.R.G.Y. series
