= The Best Science Fiction Stories: 1953 =

1953 anthology edited by Everett F. Bleiler and T. E. Dikty

- First edition
- Editors: Everett F. Bleiler and T. E. Dikty
- Language: English
- Genre: Science fiction
- Publisher: Fredrick Fell
- Publication date: 1953
- Publication place: United States
- Media type: Print (hardback)
- Pages: 279
- Preceded by: The Best Science Fiction Stories: 1952
- Followed by: The Best Science Fiction Stories: 1954

The Best Science Fiction Stories: 1953 is a 1953 anthology of science fiction short stories edited by Everett F. Bleiler and T. E. Dikty. An abridged edition was published in the UK by Grayson in 1955 under the title The Best Science Fiction Stories: Fourth Series. The stories had originally appeared in 1952 in the magazines Fantasy and Science Fiction, Thrilling Wonder Stories, Galaxy Science Fiction and Astounding.

== Contents ==
- Trematode, a Critique of Modern Science-Fiction, by Alfred Bester
- "The Fly", by Arthur Porges
- "Ararat", by Zenna Henderson
- "Counter-Transference", by William F. Temple
- "The Conqueror", by Mark Clifton
- "Machine", by John W. Jakes
- "The Middle of the Week After Next", by Murray Leinster
- "The Dreamer", by Alfred Coppel
- "The Moon Is Green", by Fritz Leiber
- "I Am Nothing", by Eric Frank Russell
- "Command Performance", by Walter M. Miller, Jr.
- "Survival", by John Wyndham
- "Game for Blondes", by John D. MacDonald
- "The Girls from Earth", by Frank M. Robinson
- "Lover, When You’re Near Me", by Richard Matheson
- "Fast Falls the Eventide", by Eric Frank Russell
- About the Authors

== Reception ==
P. Schuyler Miller reviewed the anthology as "especially good", the best in the series at that time.

== Sources ==
- Contento, William G. "Index to Science Fiction Anthologies and Collections". Archived from the original on 2007-03-10.
