= Robert Bonfils (American illustrator) =

American illustrator (1922–2018)

- Born: February 25, 1922; Kansas City, Missouri, U.S.
- Died: February 8, 2018 (aged 95)
- Education: Kansas City Art Institute; Art Institute of Chicago
- Known for: Painting; illustration

Robert Bonfils (February 25, 1922 – February 8, 2018) was an American illustrator, known for his covers for erotic, pulp fiction paperbacks.

== Biography ==
Robert Bonfils was born in 1922 in Kansas City and grew up there. After finishing high school, he attended the Kansas City Art Institute, where Thomas Hart Benton was among the teachers. In his classes were future artists like Bill and Jim Teason, Jackson Pollock, and others. After doing his service in the army, Bonfils moved to Chicago and continued his studies at the Art Institute of Chicago.

His first job was at the art agency of Stevens/Hall/Biondi, from where he emerged as professional commercial artist and a paperback cover painter. He started doing covers and illustrations for children's books, covers for Mercury Records and ads for Miller High life beer.

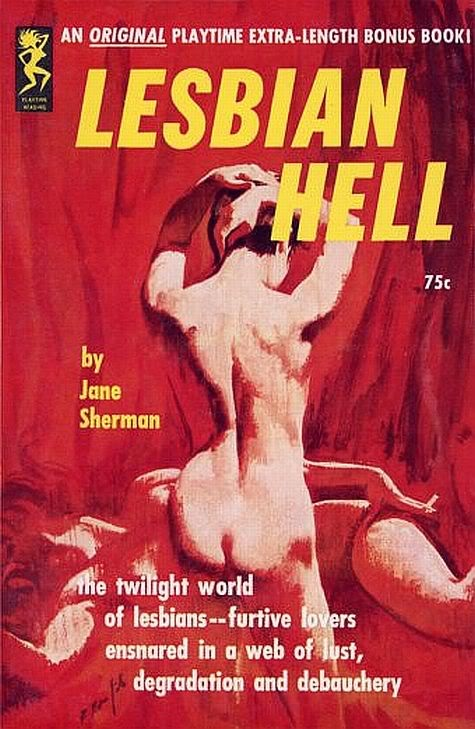
Cover of Lesbian Hell (1963)

Stanley Schrag of Playtime Books and the Sorren brothers of Merit Books recruited Bonfils to paint covers for their sex-novel paperbacks. When Harold W. McCauley retired from Nightstand Books, William Hamling hired Bonfils to replace McCauley and assigned him with setting up a new publishing operation out of San Diego, which was to become Greenleaf Classics, with Bonfils as its art director and Earl Kemp as the editor-in-chief.

During the heyday of sex publishing, Bonfils was producing some fifty covers every month. He retired from the book cover illustration business in the mid-1970s and continued to paint within the gallery community of San Diego. The original art for most Greenleaf covers has been lost, with only a few pieces having survived.

== See also ==
- Pulp magazine
- Lesbian pulp fiction
- Erotic art
- Clandestine literature
- Sexual arousal
