= E. F. Bleiler =

American writer (1920-2010)

- Born: Everett Franklin Bleiler; April 30, 1920; Massachusetts, U.S.
- Died: June 13, 2010 (aged 90); Interlaken, New York, U.S.
- Children: Richard Bleiler, John Bleiler, Constance Bleiler
- Writing career
- Language: English
- Genres: Bibliography, fiction
- Subjects: Science fiction, detective fiction, fantasy literature
- Notable awards: Pilgrim Award, World Fantasy Award for Life Achievement, International Horror Guild Living Legend

Everett Franklin Bleiler (April 30, 1920 – June 13, 2010) was an American editor, bibliographer, and scholar of science fiction, detective fiction, and fantasy literature. In the late 1940s and early 1950s, he co-edited the first "year's best" series of science fiction anthologies, and his Checklist of Fantastic Literature has been called "the foundation of modern SF bibliography". Among his other scholarly works are two Hugo Award–nominated volumes concerning early science fiction—Science-Fiction: The Early Years and Science-Fiction: The Gernsback Years—and the massive Guide to Supernatural Fiction.

Bleiler worked at Dover Publications from 1955, becoming executive vice-president of the company from 1967 until he left in 1977; he then worked for Charles Scribner's Sons until 1987. He edited a number of ghost story collections for Dover, containing what the genre historian Mike Ashley has described as "detailed and exemplary introductions".

Bleiler received the Pilgrim Award for lifetime achievement in science fiction scholarship in 1984, the World Fantasy Award for Life Achievement in 1988, the First Fandom Hall of Fame award in 1994, and the International Horror Guild Living Legend award in 2004.

In the 1970s Bleiler wrote two works of fiction, which were not published until 2006: the fantasy novel Firegang: A Mythic Fantasy, set in the tree of Yggdrasil as well as moving across time and space, and Magistrate Mai and the Invisible Murderer, a detective story set in ancient China, similar to the work of Robert van Gulik.

Bleiler's son, Richard, is also a science fiction historian and assisted his father on several of his works.

== Selected bibliography ==
=== As editor ===
==== The Best Science Fiction ====
- The Best Science Fiction Stories: 1949 (with T. E. Dikty)
- The Best Science Fiction Stories: 1950 (with T. E. Dikty)
- The Best Science Fiction Stories: 1951 (with T. E. Dikty)
- The Best Science Fiction Stories: 1952 (with T. E. Dikty)
- The Best Science Fiction Stories: 1953 (with T. E. Dikty)
- The Best Science Fiction Stories: 1954 (with T. E. Dikty)
- Year's Best Science Fiction Novels: 1952 (with T. E. Dikty)
- Year's Best Science Fiction Novels: 1953 (with T. E. Dikty)
- Year's Best Science Fiction Novels: 1954 (with T. E. Dikty)

==== Other anthologies ====
- Imagination Unlimited (with T. E. Dikty, 1952)
- Frontiers in Space (with T. E. Dikty, 1955)
- Three Gothic Novels (1966)
- Five Victorian Ghost Novels (1971)
- Eight Dime Novels (1974)
- Three Supernatural Novels of the Victorian Period (1975)
- Three Victorian Detective Novels (1978)
- A Treasury of Victorian Detective Stories (1979)
- A Treasury of Victorian Ghost Stories (1981)

==== Single-author collections ====
- Three Prophetic Science Fiction Novels of H. G. Wells (1960)
- Best Ghost Stories of J. S. Le Fanu (1964)
- Ghost and Horror Stories of Ambrose Bierce (1964)
- The Best Tales of Hoffmann, by E. T. A. Hoffmann (1967)
- The King in Yellow and Other Stories, by Robert W. Chambers (1970)
- Best Max Carrados Detective Stories, by Ernest Bramah (1972)
- Gods, Men and Ghosts, by Lord Dunsany (1972)
- The Best Dr. Thorndyke Detective Stories, by R. Austin Freeman (1973)
- Best Ghost Stories of Algernon Blackwood (1973)
- Best "Thinking Machine" Detective Stories, by Jacques Futrelle (1973)
- Ghost Stories and Mysteries, by J. S. Le Fanu (1975)
- Best Martin Hewitt Detective Stories, by Arthur Morrison (1976)
- Great Cases of the "Thinking Machine", by Jacques Futrelle (1976)
- The Collected Ghost Stories of Mrs J. H. Riddell (1977)
- The Department of Dead Ends: 14 Detective Stories, by Roy Vickers (1978)
- The Best Supernatural Tales of Arthur Conan Doyle (1979)
- The Old Man in the Corner: Twelve Mysteries, by Baroness Orczy (1980)

=== Nonfiction ===
- The Checklist of Fantastic Literature (1948; corrected and revised edition [as The Checklist of Science Fiction and Supernatural Fiction], 1978)
- The Guide to Supernatural Fiction (1983)
- Science-Fiction: The Early Years (with Richard Bleiler) (1990)
- Science-Fiction: The Gernsback Years (with Richard Bleiler) (1998)

==== As editor and contributor ====
- Science Fiction Writers (1982)
- Supernatural Fiction Writers: Fantasy and Horror (1985)

=== Fiction ===
- Firegang: A Mythic Fantasy. The Battered Silicon Dispatch Box Press, 2006. ISBN 1-55246-728-7
- Magistrate Mai and the Invisible Murderer. The Battered Silicon Dispatch Box Press, 2006. ISBN 1-55246-727-9
