= Carl Corley =

American author and illustrator

Carl Vernon Corley (December 8, 1921 – November 3, 2016) was an American author and illustrator. Beginning in the 1950s, he drew physique art for male beefcake magazines and for sale as posters. In the 1960s and 1970s, he wrote twenty-two novels of gay male pulp fiction. From the 1970s into the early 1990s, Corley continued to write stories for gay pornography magazines. Corley also has written and illustrated non-erotic projects, including Louisiana history and religious books. Gay historian John Howard, who rediscovered Corley's gay pulp novels in the 1990s, argues that Corley's work "complicates queer cultural studies by unsettling its urbanist roots." Corley's texts are not typical stories of gay young men from rural areas finding their ways to sexual liberation in cities, but instead describe "many complex nodes of circulation, not just aggregation".

== Biography ==
Carl Vernon Corley was born in Florence, Mississippi, in December 1921, growing up there to graduate from Florence High School. During World War II, Corley served in the South Pacific in the United States Marine Corps. From 1947 to 1961, he lived in Jackson, Mississippi, and worked for the Mississippi State Highway Department as an illustrator and staff artist. From 1961 to 1981, he worked in a similar position for the Louisiana Highway Department. In both jobs, he designed and illustrated tourist guides, manuals, pamphlets, road maps, and traffic surveys. He provided the cover art for at least one book on Louisiana history. In the 1970s and early 1980s, he drew a comic strip dealing with Cajun folklore for the Eunice (LA) News. He also wrote and illustrated a Louisiana state history for a small press. Corley died in November 2016 at the age of 94.

== Physique art ==
Carl Corley in the 1950s contributed homoerotic art to physique magazines, signing the work for publication with his own name. John Howard identified ten Carl Corley posters sold by Sir Prise Publishers of Chicago. He describes them as using master-slave imagery, but inverting the roles, where the darker-skinned figure dominates the lighter-skinned one. When Howard interviewed Corley in 1997, the older man told him, "One of my ambitions [was] to be the greatest male physique artist of all".

== Pulp novels ==
When Corley moved to Louisiana in 1961, he spent more time writing gay pulp fiction. Between 1966 and 1971, Corley published twenty-two erotic novels for the French Line by P.E.C. (Publishers Export Company) of San Diego and the Pad Library of Agoura, California, publishers of erotic gay pulp novels. Providing his own cover art, Corley also had the novels published under his own name, a usual act for most writers in the genre.

The novels, in order of publication, are:

- A Chosen World (1966)
- My Purple Winter (1966)
- The Scarlet Lantern (1966)
- Star Light Star Bright (1967)
- A Fool's Advice (1967)
- Fallen Eagle (1967)
- Faces in Secret (1967)
- Brazen Image (1967)
- A Lover Mourned (1967)
- Sky Eyes (1967)
- Satin Chaps (1968)
- Attala Rose (1968)
- Jesse (1968)
- The Purple Ring (1968)
- The Different and the Damned (1968)
- Cast a Wistful Eye (1968)
- Black Angel (1968)
- Trick of the Trade (1968)
- Easy Ride (1970)
- The Hustling Place (1970)
- Swamp Angel (1971)
- Jail Mate (1971)

== Themes ==
Corley's work seems to have many autobiographical elements. His early novels are set in rural Rankin County, Mississippi, including his hometown of Florence, in the early 1900s. Many plots deal with young Southern farm boys discovering gay sex, sometimes crossing racial or class lines. Some novels involve urban plots in places such as Baton Rouge and New Orleans. Perhaps most autobiographical is A Chosen World (1966), whose narrator, Rex Polo, is born in Florence, Mississippi, in 1921, just as Corley was. In the novel, Rex discovers gay sex in high school in 1936 with a football player. Rex goes on, like Corley, to serve in the military in the Pacific during World War II, and the novel details his sexual experiences, including a gang-rape by drunken soldiers. By the end of the novel, Rex is back in his hometown, becoming a physique artist, in love with his male model (Howard 200-201, 207-209). Howard comments on Corley's novels that compared to other gay pulp erotica, they "stood out as more sober, more earnest . . . . [T]itles . . . evoke literary aspirations." Howard suggests that they challenge distinctions of high-brow and low-brow writing.

== Importance ==
Carl Corley in his writing and illustrations provides a nearly unique example of out gay expression in a predominantly rural, Southern setting in the pre-Stonewall era. His work illuminates popular cultural expression as well as gay experience and imagination in the rural South.

In 1998, Duke University bought from Corley his papers, including typescripts and published copies of his novels, for their special collections in gay and lesbian studies.

== Bibliography ==
- Duke University. Manuscripts and Special Collections Library. Finding aid for Carl Corley papers available at *
- Howard, John. Men Like That: A Southern Queer History. The University of Chicago Press, 1999.
- Stryker, Susan. Queer Pulp: Perverted Passions from the Golden Age of the Paperback. San Francisco: Chronicle Books, 2001. Includes illustrations of some Corley novel covers.
- http://www.carlcorley.com/.
