= Employment (short story) =

Short story by Lyon Sprague de Camp

- Short story by L. Sprague de Camp
- Illustration of the story in Astounding Science-Fiction, May 1939
- Country: United States
- Language: English
- Genre: Science fiction

Publication
- Published in: Astounding Science-Fiction
- Publisher: Street & Smith Publications, Inc.
- Media type: Print (magazine)
- Publication date: May, 1939

"Employment" is a science fiction story by American writer L. Sprague de Camp, pioneering the concept of de-extinction. It was first published in the magazine Astounding Science-Fiction for May, 1939. The story appeared under the pseudonym Lyman R. Lyon (the name of his maternal great-grandfather) as the magazine's policy did not allow the name of any author to be repeated on the same contents page, and de Camp had another piece in the same issue under his actual name (part one of his article "Design for Life"). It first appeared in book form in the anthology Imagination Unlimited (Farrar Straus and Young, 1952). It later appeared in the anthologies Men of Space and Time (The Bodley Head, 1953), and Science Fiction Inventions (Lancer Books, 1967), as well as the de Camp collection The Best of L. Sprague de Camp (Doubleday, 1978). It was credited to de Camp's real name in all publications subsequent to its first appearance. The story has been translated into German.

== Plot summary ==
The story is set in a then-future era of the late 1950s, and is presented in the form of a letter from the protagonist, geologist Kenneth Staples, to a prospective employer, explaining why he desires to leave his present job.

Staples has been working for paleontologist/inventor Gilmore Platt, whose stereoscopic prospecting device can locate and reveal buried fossils in full detail. From an archeological colleague, Dr. Wilhelmi of Zurich, Platt gets the idea of using an electrolytic bath to restore the specimens he has been retrieving to their original condition, just as the archaeologist can do with corroded bronzes whose atoms have partly dissipated into the surrounding soil. After much experimentation, the two men succeed in restoring complete animals, hair and all, from fossil skeletons and the matrices of rock in which they are embedded. First they reconstruct an extinct Canis dirus (dire wolf), reviving it by applying an electric starter to its heart. They repeat the process with an Arctotherium (short-faced bear), which they are unable to revive and is mounted in the American Museum of Natural History, Stenomylus hitchcocki (an ancestral camel), Trilophodon (a primitive proboscidean), and Dinocyon gidleyi (a bear-dog).

They hire Elias, a former circus performer, to manage their growing collection, which they house in a concrete barn with a row of cages down one side. Staples has a close shave, when the Dinocyon escapes its cage in an attempt to prey on the Stenomylus and sees him as an adequate substitute. Platt and Elias come to his rescue, the former with a gun and the latter with a stick of dynamite. It takes the dynamite to do it. Platt then calmly revivifies the bear dog again, but incarcerates it in a stronger cage. It's later sold to the Philadelphia Zoo. It is replaced with a Dinohyus (a piglike animal the size of a buffalo).

News of the sale attracts a Mr. Nively, representing the Marco Polo Company, a membership corporation consisting of the whole country's wild animal importers and dealers. His clients want to buy out Platt's discovery, as the resurrection of prehistoric creatures has the potential to ruin the market for present-day animals, which they control. After Platt rejects a number of offers Nively resorts to threats, and is kicked out.

Meanwhile, Platt and Staples recreate their biggest animal yet, a specimen of Parelephas jeffersonii (Jeffersonian mammoth), which they name Tecumtha after the historical Shawnee chief. They also take on a new man, Jake, to assist Elias and help protect their menagerie against Nively. The precaution is well taken, but inadequate. Nively reappears early one morning and attempts to shoot Tecumtha. Enraged, the mammoth takes off after Nively, who tries to escape on Elias's bicycle. Staples, still in his pajamas, pursues both by truck. He eventually finds them in a nearby town square, with Nively perched atop an equestrian statue of General Sheridan while Tecumtha prowls about its base. When the mammoth pushes over the statue, Nively flees to a nearby tree. On Staples's advice, he then moves to the top of the truck cab to help lure Tecumtha up into the truck bed. With the animal secured, Staples extorts Nively's clothing from him and lets the villain go, only to get into a dispute with local police, who want to kill the creature as a dangerous wild animal. Rather than permit this, Staples drives off.

After shaking pursuit he calls Platt, who tells him the police have their lab staked out against his return. Accordingly, Platt suggests he drive to Chicago and sell Tecumtha to the zoo there before returning. Unfortunately, Dr. Traphagen at the zoo assumes Staples a madman on hearing his story, particularly since he can't even confirm his own identity, the only identification he can produce being Nively's. Led away by the men in the white suits, he calls to Tecumtha, whose trumpeting finally convinces Traphagen of his veracity. The sale is completed, and Tecumtha is saved.

Afterwards, Platt hires more guards and has his compound properly fenced. He begins to recreate more animals, including a Mastodon americanus for the Bronx Zoo in New York. He hires another paleontologist as an additional assistant and with him starts happily digging dinosaurs in Wyoming. Staples learns the two have found a complete Tyrannosaurus Rex skeleton, and in light of his experiences so far decides it's time to "clear out while I'm still in one piece."

== Relation to other works ==
The plot feature of a disaffected businessman's designs on a recovered mammoth is echoed in de Camp's later Reginald Rivers time travel story "The Mislaid Mastodon" (1993).
