= Knock (short story) =

Short story by Fredric Brown

"Knock" is a science fiction short story by American writer Fredric Brown. It is noted for beginning with a piece of flash fiction:

The last man on Earth sat alone in a room. There was a knock on the door ...

It then goes on to elaborate on these two sentences and build a more complete plot around them.

It was published in the December 1948 issue of Thrilling Wonder Stories. There have been three different radio adaptations (Dimension X, X Minus One and Sci Fi Channel's Seeing Ear Theatre). The story was reprinted in The Best Science Fiction Stories: 1949
