= Imagination Unlimited =

1952 anthology edited by Everett F. Bleiler and T. E. Dikty

- Dust-jacket from the first edition
- Editors: Everett F. Bleiler and T. E. Dikty
- Language: English
- Genre: Science fiction
- Publisher: Farrar, Straus & Young
- Publication date: 1952
- Publication place: United States
- Media type: Print (hardback)
- Pages: 430

Imagination Unlimited is an anthology of science fiction short stories edited by Everett F. Bleiler and T. E. Dikty, first published in hardcover by Farrar, Straus & Young in 1952. As originally published, the anthology includes thirteen stories by various authors, with an introduction and four brief essays by the editors. In the UK The Bodley Head published the work as two separate anthologies in 1953, one, containing the first six stories, under the same title as the American edition and the other, containing the remaining seven stories, as Men of Space and Time. The anthology was also reprinted in an abridged paperback edition containing seven of the stories by Berkley Books in April, 1959. Only the original edition included the introduction and the essays.

Ten of the stories collected originally appeared in the magazine Astounding; the others came from Thrilling Wonder Stories, Imagination and Galaxy Science Fiction.

== Contents ==
Key: I = reprinted in the abridged UK edition (1953); M = reprinted in Men of Space and Time (1953); stories in italics were reprinted in the abridged paperback edition (1959).

- "Introduction" (Everett F. Bleiler & T. E. Dikty)
- "Mathematics and Philosophy" (Everett F. Bleiler & T. E. Dikty)
  - I "What Dead Men Tell" (Theodore Sturgeon) (from Astounding Science Fiction, v. 44, no. 3, Nov. 1949)
  - I "Referent" (Ray Bradbury) (from Thrilling Wonder Stories, v. 33, no. 1, Oct. 1948)
- "The Physical Sciences" (Everett F. Bleiler & T. E. Dikty)
  - I "Blind Man’s Buff" (Malcolm Jameson) (from Astounding Science Fiction, v. 34, no. 2, Oct. 1944)
  - I "Pressure" (Ross Rocklynne) (from Astounding Science-Fiction, v. 23, no. 4, Jun. 1939)
  - I "The Xi Effect" (Philip Latham) (from Astounding Science Fiction, v. 44, no. 5, Jan. 1950)
  - I "Old Faithful" (Raymond Z. Gallun) (from Astounding Stories, v. 14, no. 4, Dec. 1934)
- "The Biological Sciences" (Everett F. Bleiler & T. E. Dikty)
  - M "Alas, All Thinking!" (Harry Bates) (from Astounding Stories, v. 15, no. 4, Jun. 1935)
  - M "Dune Roller" (Julian May) (from Astounding Science Fiction, v. 48, no. 4, Dec. 1951)
  - M "Employment" (L. Sprague de Camp) (from Astounding Science-Fiction, v. 23, no. 3, May 1939)
- "The Social Sciences" (Everett F. Bleiler & T. E. Dikty)
  - M "Dreams Are Sacred" (Peter Phillips) (from Astounding Science Fiction, v. 42, no. 1, Sep. 1948)
  - M "Hold Back Tomorrow" (Kris Neville) (from Imagination, v. 2, no. 4, Sep. 1951)
  - M "Berom" (John Berryman) (from Astounding Science Fiction, v. 46, no. 5, Jan. 1951)
  - M "The Fire and the Sword" (Frank Robinson) (from Galaxy Science Fiction, v. 2, no. 5, Aug. 1951)

"Referent" was originally published under the byline "Brett Sterling". "Employment" was originally published under the byline "Lyman R. Lyon".

== Reception ==
P. Schuyler Miller, noting that the anthology was "built around more or less scientific concepts," praised it as "a good job, well done," meeting the standards of the editors' previous projects.

== Sources ==
- Contento, William G. "Index to Science Fiction Anthologies and Collections". Archived from the original on 2008-01-04.
