= The Best Science Fiction Stories: 1950 =

1950 anthology edited by Everett F. Bleiler and T. E. Dikty

- Dust-jacket from the first edition
- Editors: Everett F. Bleiler and T. E. Dikty
- Language: English
- Genre: Science fiction
- Publisher: Fredrick Fell
- Publication date: 1950
- Publication place: United States
- Media type: Print (hardback)
- Pages: 347
- Preceded by: The Best Science Fiction Stories: 1949
- Followed by: The Best Science Fiction Stories: 1951

The Best Science Fiction Stories: 1950 is a 1950 anthology of science fiction short stories edited by Everett F. Bleiler and T. E. Dikty. An abridged edition was published in the UK by Grayson in 1951 under the title The Best Science Fiction Stories. The stories had originally appeared in 1949 in the magazines Astounding, The Saturday Evening Post, Fantasy and Science Fiction, Fantastic Adventures, Maclean’s, Thrilling Wonder Stories, Blue Book and Startling Stories. The anthology was later combined with the 1949 volume and reissued as Science Fiction Omnibus.

== Contents ==
- A Sort of Introduction, by Vincent Starrett
- Preface, by Everett F. Bleiler & T. E. Dikty
- "Private Eye", by Henry Kuttner
- "Doomsday Deferred", by Will F. Jenkins
- "The Hurkle Is a Happy Beast", by Theodore Sturgeon
- "Eternity Lost", by Clifford Simak
- "Easter Eggs", by Robert Spencer Carr
- "Opening Doors", by Wilmar H. Shiras
- "Five Years in the Marmalade", by Robert W. Krepps
- "Dwellers in Silence", by Ray Bradbury
- "Mouse", by Fredric Brown
- "Refuge for Tonight", by Robert Moore Williams
- "The Life-Work of Professor Muntz", by Murray Leinster
- "Flaw", by John D. MacDonald
- "The Man", by Ray Bradbury
- About the Authors

== Reception ==
P. Schuyler Miller received the anthology favorably, praising "the literary taste and broad knowledge of the field shown by its editors."

== Sources ==
- Contento, William G. "Index to Science Fiction Anthologies and Collections". Archived from the original on 2008-01-04.
