= Great Science Fiction Stories About the Moon =

1967 anthology by T. E. Dikty

- Dust-jacket from the first edition
- Author: Edited by T. E. Dikty
- Language: English
- Genre: Science fiction
- Publisher: Fredrick Fell
- Publication date: 1967
- Publication place: United States
- Media type: Print (hardback)
- Pages: 221

Great Science Fiction Stories About the Moon is a 1967 anthology of science fiction short stories edited by T. E. Dikty and published by Fredrick Fell. The stories had originally appeared in the magazines Analog Science Fiction and Fact, Galaxy Science Fiction, Fantasy and Science Fiction, Thrilling Wonder Stories and Astounding.

== Contents ==
- "Earth’s Natural Satellite", by T. E. Dikty
- Table of Comparisons: Earth and Moon
- Significant Events in Lunar Exploration
- "Moon Prospector", by William B. Ellern
- "The Reluctant Heroes", by Frank M. Robinson
- "Glimpses of the Moon", by Wallace West
- "The Pro", by Edmond Hamilton
- "Honeymoon in Hell", by Fredric Brown
- "Via Death", by Eando Binder
- "Trends", by Isaac Asimov
- Glossary
