= André Hardellet =

French poet and writer (1911–1974)

- Born: 13 February 1911; Vincennes, France
- Died: 24 July 1974 (aged 63); Paris
- Occupation: Author

André Hardellet (13 February 1911 – 24 July 1974) was a French poet and writer. He was the 1974 winner of the Prix des Deux Magots.

== Biography ==
Hardellet was born at Vincennes. He began to study medicine, but dropped his studies to assume the leadership of his family's business, Les Alliances Nuptia, a jewelry-fabrication shop in Marais. He later developed into a wide-ranging author, publishing poems, short stories, essays, song lyrics, novels and stories. He published Lourdes, Lentes (1969) using the pseudonym Stève Masson. The erotic nature of that work is rumored to have shocked Raymond Marcellin, the Minister of the Interior. In 1973 Hardellet was condemned by the 17e chambre correctionnelle de Paris, for "outrages against good morals". Hardellet was greatly affected by this pronouncement, and died the following year. The year of Hardellet's death was somewhat ironically crowned as his literary pinnacle, when he was awarded (posthumously) the 1974 Prix des Deux Magots for his collected poems, Les Chasseurs deux (The Two Hunters). In 1975 a collection of Hardellet's poems, Poètes d'aujourd'hui (Today's Poets), edited by Hubert Juin, was issued. In 1990 Guy Darol published an essay, André Hardellet ou le Don de double vie (Andre Hardellet, or the Don of the Double Life). The essay was re-issued in 1998.

== Artistic and literary relations ==
- André Breton said of Hardellet in 1958: "he conquered only the really worthwhile far-distant terrain" (le conquérant des seules terres vraiment lointaines qui vaillent la peine).
- Françoise Demougin, Associate Professor of Literature at Stendhal University, has worked since 1984 on the writings of Hardellet, basing her thesis on his work.
- French film-maker Philippe Claudel, Associate Professor of Modern Literature at Nancy 2 University, based his thesis on Hardellet's work, titling it "Géographies d'André Hardellet".
- Guy Béart has recorded Hardellet's songs: Bal chez Temporel; Si tu reviens jamais danser chez Temporel; Un jour ou l'autre; Pense à ceux qui tous ont laissé leurs noms gravés; and Auprès du nôtre - which was also recorded (with a female-angle rewording) by Patachou.
- In 1972 a short film based on Hardellet's writing, La dernière violette (The Last Violet), starring Serge Gainsbourg, was released.
- In 2008 a collection of Hardellet's work was released by Les éditions Au Signe de la Licorne, titled Présence d'André Hardellet.
- French painter Henri Landier created a water-color portrait of Hardellet in 1960.

== Works ==
- La Cité Montgol. Paris, Seghers, 1952, poetry.
- Le Luisant et la Sorgue. Paris, Seghers, 1954, poetry.
- Le Seuil du jardin. Paris, Julliard, 1958, novel. (revised ed., Jean-Jacques Pauvert, 1966, Paris).
- Sommeils. Paris, Seghers, 1960, poetry.
- Le Parc des Archers. Paris, Julliard, 1962, novel.
- Les Chasseurs. Paris, Jean-Jacques Pauvert, 1966, poetry.
- Lourdes, lentes… (under the pen name Stève Masson). Paris, Jean-Jacques Pauvert, 1969, story.
- Lady Long Solo. Paris, Jean-Jacques Pauvert, 1971, illustrated by Serge Dajan.
- Les Chasseurs deux. Paris, éditions Jean-Jacques Pauvert, 1973, poetry, Prix des Deux Magots 1974.
- Donnez-moi le temps. Paris, Julliard, collection; "Idée fixe", 1973.
- La Promenade imaginaire. Paris, Mercure de France, collection; "Roue libre", 1974.
- L'Essuyeur de tempêtes. Paris, Plasma, collection; "Les Feuilles vives", 1979.
- L'Oncle Jules. Paris, Régine Deforges, 1986, illustrated by Wiaz.
- Oneïros ou La Belle Lurette. Paris, Gallimard, collection; "L'Imaginaire", 2001.
- Œuvres complètes, 3 tomes. Paris, Gallimard, collection; "L'Arpenteur", 1990-1992.

== Quotations ==
- "Love - is the country opened to infinity by two mirrors facing each other." (L'amour - c'est ce pays à l'infini ouvert par deux miroirs qui se font face.)
- "I took twenty years to learn how to write a sentence." (J'ai mis vingt ans pour savoir écrire une phrase.)
- "If the great Parisian poets have received much from the city, they also gave it much; the city has increased in sense and value because of their work." (Si les grands poètes de Paris ont reçu beaucoup de la capitale, ils lui ont donné autant : la ville a changé de valeur et de sens avec leur œuvre.)
- "What we love, we love forever." (Ce qu'on aime on l'aime depuis toujours. - from Lourdes, lentes)
