= Earl Kemp =

American publisher (1929–2020)

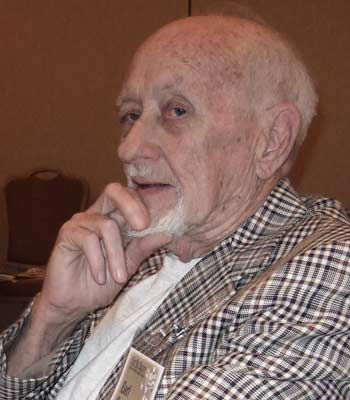
- Earl Kemp in 2007
- Born: November 24, 1929 Crossett, Arkansas, US
- Died: February 29, 2020 (aged 90)
- Occupation: Editor, literary critic, publisher
- Genre: Science fiction, pornography

Earl Kemp (born Finis Earl Kemp, November 24, 1929 – February 29, 2020) was an American publisher, science fiction editor, critic, and fan who won a Hugo Award for Best Fanzine in 1961 for Who Killed Science Fiction, a collection of questions and answers with top writers in the field. Kemp also helped found Advent:Publishers, a small publishing house focused on science fiction criticism, history, and bibliography, and served as chairman of the 20th World Science Fiction Convention. During the 1960s and '70s, Kemp was also involved in publishing a number of erotic paperbacks, including an illustrated edition of the Presidential Report of the Commission on Obscenity and Pornography. This publication led to Kemp being sentenced to one year in prison for "conspiracy to mail obscene material," but he served only the federal minimum of three months and one day.

== Background ==
Born Finis Earl Kemp in the Old Crossett Camp, an old lumber camp on the Chemin-a-Haut Creek, located south of present-day Crossett, Arkansas, in 1929 to Finis Watson Kemp (11 July 1904 – 20 July 1999) (a lumberjack at the time of his birth) and Ruth Magnolia Underwood (19 Sept 1906-15 Sept 2000). He later moved to Chicago, where he worked as a graphics artist.

Before Kemp left Arkansas, he discovered pulp fiction. As Kemp once wrote, "There were a number of magazines that struck my fancy for different reasons, among them were titles like Planet Stories, Weird Tales, Spicy Mystery Stories, etc. It was probably my emerging pubescence tilting me toward the spicy parts, but I had always been easy to tilt."

== Science fiction editor and fan ==
In 1952, Kemp attended his first World Science Fiction Convention. As he later said, "It was like walking into a world I had been seeking for a very long time. I felt, instantly, that I was at home at last and among my kind of people."

In 1956 Kemp and other members of the University of Chicago Science Fiction Club founded Advent:Publishers, which publishes science fiction criticism, history, and bibliography. One of their first books was In Search of Wonder, a hardcover collection of the book reviews of Damon Knight. Critics have said the book created the "foundation for all subsequent SF criticism."

Kemp won the Hugo Award for Best Fanzine in 1961 for his publication Who Killed Science Fiction. To create the fanzine, "Earl sent the same five questions to 108 people, the elite of the science fiction world. And he printed the seventy-one responses he received." The fanzine was distributed by the Spectator Amateur Press Society (SAPS), a long-running amateur press association. Kemp's win caused a bit of controversy because some felt that his publication had only a single issue; afterwards the award's eligibility rules for fanzines were changed to prevent single-issue publications from winning. However, Who Killed Science Fiction was actually the first SaFari Annual, part of a series of fanzines Kemp was publishing for SAPS, and the "controversy" was largely based on misunderstanding. In 2006 Kemp published a significant updating of Who Killed Science Fiction as the 29th issue of his current fanzine e*I*. It reprinted the entirety of the original 1961 edition and added considerable new material. In 2011 a book edition of Who Killed Science Fiction was published by The Merry Blacksmith Press.

Kemp also served as chairman of the 20th World Science Fiction Convention. In 1961, he wrote a letter to Isaac Asimov in which he stated that "based on your delightful wit, and frankly your reputation" someone had jokingly suggested that Asimov deliver a pseudo-lecture at the convention. Kemp stated, "Specifically it should be delivered at the masquerade and should be something on the theme of THE POSITIVE POWER OF POSTERIOR PINCHING. They went on to say that we would, naturally furnish some suitable posteriors for demonstration purposes." Asimov responded that, "I have no doubt I could give a stimulating talk that would stiffen the manly fiber of every one in the audience. However, I am not yet ready to give an unqualified acquiescence. It does occur to me, now and then, that there is some age at which I ought to gain a kind of minimal dignity suiting my [unintelligible] position in life. Besides the real reason is that I will have to ask the permission of various people who are (or would be) concerned in the matter. If they say 'no', it will be 'no.' Of course, I could be persuaded to do so on very short notice; even after the convention began, if the posteriors in question were of particularly compelling interest. Yours, Asimov." The suggested pseudo-lecture did not occur.

In 1963 Kemp edited The Proceedings: CHICON III, published by Advent:Publishers. The book included transcripts of lectures and panels given during the course of the convention, along with numerous photographs.

Kemp edited a number of science fiction fanzines up until 1965, including Destiny and SaFari. After a 37-year break, Kemp returned to editing fanzines with e*I*, which focuses on his memoirs of the science fiction world and is available online.

In September 2013, after a campaign mounted by his son, Earl Terry Kemp, he was named to the First Fandom Hall of Fame in a ceremony at the 71st World Science Fiction Convention.

According to his official death certificate Finis Earl Kemp died on February 29, 2020, at 12:48 at his Tecate, Mexico, residence of a pulmonary thromboembolism and was subsequently cremated. (Not as incorrectly reported by various fan-related sources on February 6, 2020, after falling at his home.)

== Pornography and gay books ==
During the 1960s and '70s, Kemp was involved in publishing erotic paperbacks through a company, Greenleaf Classics, where he was employed by William Hamling. In an example of détournement, Kemp published an illustrated edition of the Presidential Report of the Commission on Obscenity and Pornography. The book was "replete with the sort of photographs the commission examined." Kemp eventually was sentenced to a one-year prison sentence for distributing the book (as was Hamling). However, both served only the federal minimum of three months and one day. The story of their arrest and prison time was covered in Gay Talese's Thy Neighbor's Wife.

Kemp also was involved in publishing gay-themed books while at Greenleaf, one of the earliest editors to do so, leading novelist Victor J. Banis to call Kemp the "Godfather of gay publishing" (even though, as Banis says, "Earl himself was resolutely heterosexual"). Among the books Kemp edited in the 1960s were Banis's novel The Why Not and a series of gay pulp fiction spy parodies called The Man from C.A.M.P. Banis says once Kemp and Greenleaf proved how much of a market there was for erotic gay fiction, other publishers soon joined in.

Hamling's company published Rogue men's magazine, a competitor of Playboy. Rogue and the Greenleaf book operation under Kemp's direction employed and/or published a number of noted figures in science fiction, including Harlan Ellison, Frank M. Robinson, Algis Budrys, Robert Silverberg and many others.

== "Desert Resident" ==
Kemp appeared in a late 2007 segment of WIRED Science titled "Peak Water", identified only as "Earl Kemp, Desert Resident", in which he discussed the realities of water supply in his home near Kingman, Arizona.

== Bibliography ==
- "The Science-Fiction Book Index" by Earl Kemp in
  - The Best Science Fiction Stories and Novels: 1955, edited by T. E. Dikty, Fell 1955.
  - The Best Science Fiction Stories and Novels: 1956, edited by T. E. Dikty, Fell 1956.
  - The Best Science Fiction Stories and Novels: Ninth Series, edited by T. E. Dikty, Advent:Publishers, 1958.
- The Science Fiction Novel, edited by Earl Kemp, Advent:Publishers, 1959.
- Who Killed Science Fiction, collection of interviews with science fiction writers and others, winner of the 1961 Hugo Award for Best Fanzine.
- The Proceedings: CHICON III, edited by Earl Kemp, Advent:Publishers, 1963.
- The Illustrated Presidential Report of the Commission on Obscenity and Pornography, edited by Earl Kemp, Greenleaf Classics, Inc., 1970.
- Sin-A-Rama: Sleaze Sex Paperbacks of the Sixties edited by Brittany A. Daley, Hedi El Kholti, Earl Kemp, Miriam Linna, and Adam Parfrey. Feral House, 2004. Winner of an Independent Publisher Book Award for Best Pop Culture Book of 2006.
- The Memoirs of an Angry Man, by Earl Kemp, edited by Earl Terry Kemp, The Last Stand, 2013.
