= The Best Science Fiction Stories: 1949 =

1949 anthology edited by Everett F. Bleiler and T. E. Dikty

- Dust-jacket from the first edition
- Editors: Everett F. Bleiler and T. E. Dikty
- Language: English
- Genre: Science fiction
- Publisher: Fredrick Fell
- Publication date: 1949
- Publication place: United States
- Media type: Print (hardback)
- Pages: 314
- Followed by: The Best Science Fiction Stories: 1950

The Best Science Fiction Stories: 1949 is a 1949 anthology of science fiction short stories edited by Everett F. Bleiler and T. E. Dikty. It was the first published anthology to present the best science fiction stories for a given year. The stories had originally appeared in 1948 in the magazines Planet Stories, Astounding Science Fiction, Blue Book, Comment, and Thrilling Wonder Stories. The anthology was later combined with the 1950 volume and reissued as Science Fiction Omnibus.

== Contents ==
- Trends in Modern Science-Fiction, by Melvin Korshak
- Preface, by Everett F. Bleiler & T. E. Dikty
- "Mars is Heaven!", by Ray Bradbury
- "Ex Machina", by Lewis Padgett
- "The Strange Case of John Kingman", by Murray Leinster
- "Doughnut Jockey", by Erik Fennel
- "Thang", by Martin Gardner
- "Period Piece", by J. J. Coupling
- "Knock", by Fredric Brown
- "Genius", by Poul Anderson
- "And the Moon Be Still as Bright", by Ray Bradbury
- "No Connection", by Isaac Asimov
- "In Hiding", by Wilmar H. Shiras
- "Happy Ending", by Henry Kuttner

== Reception ==
L. Sprague de Camp received the anthology favorably, describing it as "a superior product . . . with all the stories readable and some excellent."
