= The Best Science Fiction Stories and Novels: 1956 =

1956 anthology edited by T. E. Dikty

- Dust-jacket from the first edition
- Author: edited by T. E. Dikty
- Language: English
- Genre: Science fiction
- Publisher: Fredrick Fell
- Publication date: 1956
- Publication place: United States
- Media type: Print (hardback)
- Pages: 256 pp

The Best Science Fiction Stories and Novels: 1956 is a 1956 anthology of science fiction short stories edited by T. E. Dikty. The stories originally appeared in 1955 and 1956 in the magazines Startling Stories, Astounding, Galaxy Science Fiction, Imaginative Tales, Fantastic Universe, Fantasy and Science Fiction and If.

== Contents ==
- The Science-Fiction Year, by T. E. Dikty
- "Jungle Doctor", by Robert F. Young
- "Judgment Day", by L. Sprague de Camp
- "The Game of Rat and Dragon", by Cordwainer Smith
- "The Man Who Always Knew", by Algis Budrys
- "Dream Street", by Frank M. Robinson
- "You Created Us", by Tom Godwin
- "Swenson, Dispatcher", by R. DeWitt Miller
- "Thing", by Ivan Janvier
- "I Do Not Love Thee, Doctor Fell", by Robert Bloch
- "Clerical Error", by Mark Clifton
- "A Canticle for Leibowitz", by Walter M. Miller, Jr.
- "The Cyber and Justice Holmes", by Frank Riley
- "The Shores of Night", by Thomas N. Scortia
- The Science-Fiction Book Index, by Earl Kemp
