= Les Vingt Meilleurs Récits de science-fiction =

First edition

Les Vingt Meilleurs Récits de science-fiction is an anthology of twenty short stories of science fiction composed and presented by Hubert Juin, published by Éditions Marabout in 1964.

== Content ==
- Preface
- Un homme contre la ville, by Robert Abernathy
- La patrouille du temps, by Poul Anderson, translation by Bruno Martin
- Les Mouches, by Isaac Asimov, translation by Roger Durand
- L'Homme que Vénus va condamner, by Alfred Bester
- La bibliothèque de Babel, by Jorge Luis Borges, translation by N. Ibarra
- Les mécaniques du bonheur, by Ray Bradbury
- La machine à arrêter le temps, by Dino Buzzati
- Axolotl, by Julio Cortázar
- Le père truqué, by Philip K. Dick, translation by Alain Dorémieux
- Le monde que j'avais quitté, by A. Dnieprov
- Du temps et des chats, by Howard Fast
- La Mouche, by George Langelaan
- La grande caravane, by Fritz Leiber
- La couleur tombé du ciel, by H. P. Lovecraft, translation by Louis Pauwels and Jacques Bergier
- Journal d'un monstre, by Richard Matheson
- La soif noire, by Catherine L. Moore
- Tout smouales étaient les borogoves, by Lewis Padgett, translation by Boris Vian
- Les étranges études du Dr Paukenschlager, by Jean Ray
- Les Conquérants, by Jacques Sternberg
- Bucolique, by A. E. van Vogt, translation by Richard Chomet

== Sources ==
- Fiche sur iSFdb
- Fiche sur Noosfère
