= Victor J. Banis =

American author (1937–2019)

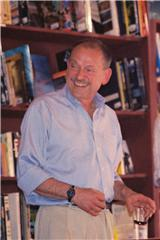
- Born: Victor Jerome Banis; May 25, 1937; Huntingdon County, Pennsylvania, US
- Died: February 22, 2019 (aged 81); Martinsburg, West Virginia, US
- Occupation: Novelist
- Writing career
- Period: 1960–2019
- Genres: Gay pulp fiction, Mass market paperback, Science fiction

Victor Jerome Banis (May 25, 1937 – February 22, 2019) was an American author, often associated with the first wave of West Coast gay writing. For his contributions, he has been called "the godfather of modern popular gay fiction". He was gay.

== Early and personal life ==
Born on May 25, 1937, in Huntingdon County, Pennsylvania, Victor J. Banis was the tenth of eleven children born to William and Anna Banis. As a small child, Banis moved with his family to Eaton, Ohio, where he lived on a farm and finished high school in 1955. While still in grade school, he began writing Nancy Drew-inspired mysteries featuring his classmate Carol Peters, now the writer Carol Cail. In his memoirs, he writes about growing up in severe poverty.

On his own, Banis lived for a brief time in Birmingham, Alabama, before moving to Dayton, Ohio, where he worked in sales and floral design. In 1960 he moved to Los Angeles, where he lived for 20 years and had his first literary success. He rapidly turned out a number of important novels, and he and his partner, Sam Dodson, collaborated on a number of nonfictional gay works as well as a few, generally insignificant novels. They also published magazines and edited for DSI, a Minneapolis publisher. Banis served as a tutor for various aspiring writers and acted as their de facto agent. He championed the early writing of mystery writer Joseph Hansen, among others. In 1980, he moved to Big Bear in the San Bernardino Mountains, and then in 1985 to San Francisco, where he worked as a property manager. In 2004, he retired and took up residence in Martinsburg, West Virginia. There, he returned to writing full-time.

== Writings ==
Banis's first published work was a short story, "Broken Record", that appeared in the Swiss gay publication Der Kreis in 1963. His first long work of fiction was The Affairs of Gloria, a heterosexual romance with a few lesbian scenes inspired by the recent popularity of novels with lesbian themes; it was published in 1964 by Brandon House, a Los Angeles paperback publisher. The novel was indicted by a federal grand jury in Sioux City, Iowa, for conspiracy to distribute obscene materials in a government scheme to crack down on materials deemed pornographic. Although some of his co-defendants were found guilty, Banis himself was acquitted.

Banis continued to write both straight and bisexual novels for Brandon House, but incensed by government censorship, he was increasingly drawn to depicting the struggling gay scene that was yet barely chronicled in American literature. His first significant work of fiction was the innovative novel The Why Not, 1966. A series of intertwining sketches of habitués of a Los Angeles gay bar, it was the first gay work published by a San Diego firm, Greenleaf Classics.

Finding the novel sold well, editor-in-chief Earl Kemp asked Banis to submit other gay novels. Thus was born The Man from C.A.M.P. (1966). The success of the original novel was so great that Banis went on to write eight sequels (1966–1968). The series is historically important for several reasons. It was the first gay mystery series, already five in number before George Baxt could follow up on his success with A Queer Kind of Death (also 1966), and the C.A.M.P. novels depicted what is probably the first openly out and joyfully unrestrained gay hero in American letters, the indomitable undercover agent Jackie Holmes.

Banis wrote under a number of pseudonyms for Greenleaf, Brandon House, and Sherbourne Press. They include Victor Jay, J. X. Williams, Jay Vickery, and others for his gay pulp fiction works. However, upon the success of The Gay Haunt (1970), published by Maurice Girodias in his Traveller's Companion series, Banis moved away from the gay genre. He began writing heterosexual Gothic romances, again under a variety of pseudonyms. Jan Alexander and Lynn Benedict were two of the most popular. In 1977, he moved into more mainstream publishing with a historical novel, This Splendid Earth, written under the byline V. J. Banis and published by St. Martin's Press. Its success led to a sequel and opened doors at Warner Books and Arbor House. But by 1980, he was feeling burned out and ceased publishing.

In the early 2000s, Banis found himself approached by various scholars seeking information about the history of gay publishing during those crucial years in the 1960s. Their number included Hubert C. Kennedy, Michael Bronski, Susan Stryker, Fabio Cleto, and Drewey Wayne Gunn. In 2004, Professor Cleto of the university in Bergamo, Italy, contacted Haworth Books about republishing three of the early C.A.M.P. novels and convinced his own university to publish Banis's memoirs, Spine Intact, Some Creases. In 2006, Bill Warner of GLB Press brought out a second trilogy of C.A.M.P. novels, and Michael Burgess of Wildside Press began republishing others of Banis's long out-of-print novels.

Banis began writing fiction once again. He appeared in a number of anthologies. Come This Way, a collection of new and some old stories along with excerpts from earlier novels, was published by Regal Crest Enterprises in 2007 with an homage from Drewey Wayne Gunn. The same year, Wildside Press published Avalon, a heterosexual romance set in the 1940s through the 1970s, and Carroll and Graf published the gay Western romance Longhorns, with an informative essay by Michael Bronski, his first new novels in more than thirty years.

== List of selected works ==
1. "Broken Record," in Der Kreis, 1963, by Victor J. Banis – short story
2. "David Victorious," in One magazine, 1963, by Victor J. Banis – poem
3. The Affairs of Gloria (Brandon House 1964) by Victor Jay – novel
4. The Why Not (Greenleaf Classics 1966; Wildside Press 2007) by Victor J. Banis – novel
5. The Man from C.A.M.P. (Greenleaf Classics/Leisure Books 1966) by Don Holliday; included in That Man from C.A.M.P. – mystery (C.A.M.P. # 1)
6. Color Him Gay (Greenleaf Classics/Leisure Books 1966) by Don Holliday; (Wildside Press 2007) by Victor J. Banis – mystery (C.A.M.P. # 2)
7. The Watercress File (Greenleaf Classics/Leisure Books 1966) by Don Holliday – mystery (C.A.M.P. # 3)
8. The Son Goes Down (Greenleaf Classics/Leisure Books 1966) by Don Holliday; included in That Man from C.A.M.P. – mystery (C.A.M.P. # 4)
9. Gothic Gaye (Greenleaf Classics/Leisure Books 1966) by Don Holliday; e-book (GLB Publishers 2006) by Victor J. Banis; included in Tales from C.A.M.P. – mystery (C.A.M.P. # 5)
10. Good-bye My Lover (Sundown Reader 1966) by J. X. Williams; e-book (GLB Publishers 2006); Goodbye, My Lover (Wildside Press 2007) by Victor J. Banis – murder mystery
11. Rally Round the Fag (Ember Library 1967) by Don Holliday; e-book (GLB Publishers 2006) by Victor J. Banis; included in Tales from C.A.M.P. – mystery (C.A.M.P. # 6)
12. The Gay Dogs (Ember Library 1967) by Don Holliday; (Wildside Press 2007) by Victor J. Banis – mystery (C.A.M.P. # 7)
13. Holiday Gay (Phoenix Companion Books 1967) by Don Holliday; included in That Man from C.A.M.P. – mystery (C.A.M.P. # 8)
14. Stranger at the Door (Late Hour Library 1967) by Don Holliday; (Wildside Press 2007) by Victor J. Banis – novel
15. Three on a Broomstick (Adult Books 1967) by Don Holliday – novel
16. Sex and the Single Gay (Greenleaf Classics/Leisure Books 1967) by Don Holliday – advice
17. Blow the Man Down (Late Hour Library 1968) by Don Holliday; (GLB Publishers 2006), e-book by Victor J. Banis; included in Tales from C.A.M.P. – mystery (C.A.M.P. # 9)
18. Brandon's Boy (Adult Books 1968) by Jay Vickery; The Greek Boy (Wildside Press 2007) by Victor J. Banis – novel
19. Man into Boy (Adult Books 1968) by Jay Vickery – science fiction
20. Gay Treason (Ember Library 1968) by J. X. Williams – World War II romance
21. Homo Farm (Brandon House 1968) by Victor Jay; Kenny's Back (Wildside Press 2007) by Victor J. Banis – mystery
22. The Pussycat Man (Sherburne Press 1969; Award Books 1970) by Victor J. Banis – novel
23. Friar Peck and His Tale (Greenleaf Classics 1969), published anonymously – novel
24. The Gay Haunt (The Other Traveller 1970) by Victor Jay; (Traveller's Companion 1972; Wildside Press 2007) by Victor J. Banis – supernatural novel
25. Shadows (Lancer Books 1970) by Jan Alexander – Gothic romance
26. The Wolves of Craywood (Lancer Books 1970) by Jan Alexander; (Wildside Press 2007) by V. J. Banis – Gothic romance
27. House of Fools (Lancer Books 1971) by Jan Alexander – Gothic romance
28. The Second House: A Novel of Terror (Beagle Books 1971) by Jan Alexander – Gothic romance
29. White Jade (Popular Library 1971) by Jan Alexander; (Wildside Press 2007) by V. J. Banis – Gothic romance
30. The Devil's Dance (Avon 1972) by Jan Alexander; (Wildside Press 2007) by V. J. Banis – Gothic romance
31. House at Rose Point (Avon 1972) by Jan Alexander – Gothic romance
32. The Girl Who Never Was (Lancer Books 1972) by Jan Alexander – Gothic romance
33. The Glass House (Popular Library 1972) by Jan Alexander; (Wildside Press 2007) by V. J. Banis – Gothic romance
34. The Glass Painting (Popular Library 1972) by Jan Alexander; (Wildside Press 2007) by V. J. Banis – Gothic romance
35. Moon Garden (Popular Library 1972) by Jan Alexander; (Wildside Press 2007) by V. J. Banis – Gothic romance
36. The Bishop's Palace (Popular Library 1973) by Jan Alexander – Gothic romance
37. Darkwater (Pocket Books 1975) by Jan Alexander; (Wildside Press 2007) by V. J. Banis – Gothic romance
38. The Haunting of Helen Wren (Pocket Books, 1975; Thorndike Press 2004) by Jan Alexander – Gothic romance
39. Blood Ruby (Ballantine 1975) by Jan Alexander; (Thorndike Press 2004) by V. J. Banis – Gothic romance
40. The Sword and the Rose (Pyramid Books 1975) by Victor Banis; (Wildside Press 2007) by Victor J. Banis – novel
41. The Lion's Gate (Berkley Medallion 1976) by Jan Alexander; (Wildside Press 2007) by V. J. Banis – Gothic romance
42. Green Willows (Pocket Books 1977; Thorndike Press 2004) by Jan Alexander – Gothic romance
43. This Splendid Earth (St. Martin's Press 1978; Wildside Press 2007) by V. J. Banis – historical romance
44. Blood Moon (Lancer Books 1979) by Jan Alexander – Gothic romance
45. The Earth and All It Holds (St. Martin's Press 1980; Wildside Press 2007) by V. J. Banis – historical romance
46. The Moonsong Chronicles (Pinnacle 1981) by Jessica Stuart – The Moonsong Chronicles #1
47. A Westward Love (Warner 1981) by Elizabeth Monterey; (Wildside Press 2007) by V. J. Banis – romance
48. San Antone (Arbor House 1985; Wildside Press 2007) by V. J. Banis – Western romance
49. Spine Intact, Some Creases: Remembrances of a Paperback Writer (ECIG 2004) by Victor J. Banis, edited with an introduction by # Fabio Cleto; revised (Wildside Press 2007) – memoirs
50. That Man from C.A.M.P.: Rebel without a Pause (Harrington Park Press 2004) by Victor J. Banis, edited with an introduction and an interview by Fabio Cleto – anthology (three novels)
51. Tales from Camp: Jackie's Back (GLB Publishers 2006) by Victor J. Banis, with an interview and checklist by Drewey Wayne Gunn – anthology (three novels)
52. Avalon (Wildside Press 2007) by V. J. Banis – romance
53. Longhorns (Carroll & Graf 2007) by Victor J. Banis, with a foreword by Michael Bronski – Western romance
54. Come This Way (Regal Crest Enterprises 2007) by Victor J. Banis, edited by Lori L. Lake with a foreword by Drewey Wayne Gunn – collection of short fiction
55. The Wolves of Craywood (Wildside Press 2007) by V. J. Banis – supernatural romance
56. The Devil's Dance (Wildside Press 2007) by V. J. Banis – supernatural romance
57. The Astral: Till the Day I Die (Wildside Press 2007) by V. J. Banis – supernatural romance
58. Life and Other Passing Moments (Wildside Press 2007) by Victor J. Banis, edited by Robert Reginald – collection of short fiction
59. Drag Thing (Wildside Press 2007) by Victor J. Banis
60. Lola Dances (ManLoveRomance Press 2008) by Victor J. Banis
61. A Deadly Kind of Love (Dreamspinner Press 2011) by Victor J. Banis
