= The Best Science Fiction Stories and Novels: Ninth Series =

1958 anthology edited by T. E. Dikty

- Dust-jacket from the first edition
- Author: edited by T. E. Dikty
- Cover artist: J. May
- Language: English
- Genre: Science fiction
- Publisher: Advent
- Publication date: 1958
- Publication place: United States
- Media type: Print (hardback)
- Pages: 258 pp

The Best Science Fiction Stories and Novels: Ninth Series is a 1958 anthology of science fiction short stories edited by T. E. Dikty. The stories had originally appeared in 1956 and 1957 in the magazines Astounding, If, Fantasy and Science Fiction, Venture Science Fiction Magazine, Satellite and Science Fiction Stories.

== Contents ==
- The Science-Fiction Year, by T. E. Dikty
- "2066: Election Day, by Michael Shaara
- "The Mile-Long Spaceship, by Kate Wilhelm
- "The Last Victory, by Tom Godwin
- "Call Me Joe, by Poul Anderson
- "Didn’t He Ramble, by Chad Oliver
- "The Queen’s Messenger, by John J. McGuire
- "The Other People, by Leigh Brackett
- "Into Your Tent I’ll Creep, by Eric Frank Russell
- "Nor Dust Corrupt, by James V. McConnell
- "Nightsound, by Algis Budrys
- "The Tunesmith, by Lloyd Biggle, Jr.
- "Hunting Machine, by Carol Emshwiller
- The Science-Fiction Book Index, by Earl Kemp

== Reception ==
Anthony Boucher unhappily dismissed this anthology as an "assembly of the tedious, trite and ill-reasoned," excepting only Anderson's story as "firstrate" and the short pieces from Emshwiller, Oliver and Russell as "good (if far from 'best')". Damon Knight singled out the Anderson and Emshwiller stories as "first-rate," dismissing the remainder as "mostly dead-level puzzles of melodramas, each one grayly blending into a hundred similar stories you have read and mildly enjoyed."
