= Richard Amory =

American novelist

Richard Amory (October 18, 1927 – August 1, 1981), born Richard Wallace Love, was an American writer from Halfway, Oregon. He obtained a bachelor's degree in sociology from Ohio State University, a M.A. in Spanish from San Francisco State University, and began an uncompleted Ph.D. in Spanish at University of California, Berkeley. A high school teacher by profession, he achieved success as a novelist in the late 1960s while still a graduate student and before coming out.

Amory is best known for his 1966 novel Song of the Loon: A Gay Pastoral in Five Books and an Interlude and its sequels, including Song of Aaron and Listen, the Loon Sings. Variously described as "a gay American version of famous sixteenth-century Spanish pastoral novels" and "a gay version of The Last of the Mohicans," Song of the Loon has been called "one of the most important gay books of the 20th century." In 1994 one bibliographer estimated that one third of American gay men had read the novel.

Song of the Loon was adapted as an erotic film in 1970 without Amory's involvement and much to his disgust. It also inspired a spoof, Fruit of the Loon by "Richard Armory" (in reality veteran porn writer George Davies who wrote under pen names including Clay Caldwell or Lance Lester).

Amory briefly partnered with fellow authors Dirk Vanden, Phil Andros, Peter Tuesday Hughes, Larry Townsend, and Douglas Dean in an attempt to found the first all-gay publishing company, which was to be called The Renaissance Group. The group was unable to secure funding for the attempt and several of its members ceased publishing shortly thereafter.

He died in San Jose, California.

== Bibliography ==
- Song of the Loon (1966)
- Song of Aaron (1967)
- Listen, the Loon Sings (1968)
- A Handsome Young Man with Class (1969)
- Longhorn Drive (1969)
- Naked on Main Street (1969)
- Frost (1972)
- Willow Song (1974)

== See also ==
- Gay pulp fiction
