= The Best Science Fiction Stories: 1954 =

1954 anthology edited by Everett F. Bleiler and T. E. Dikty

- First edition
- Editors: E. F. Bleiler and T. E. Dikty
- Language: English
- Genre: Science fiction
- Publisher: Fredrick Fell
- Publication date: 1954
- Publication place: United States
- Media type: Print (hardback)
- Pages: 316
- Preceded by: The Best Science Fiction Stories: 1953

The Best Science Fiction Stories: 1954 is a 1954 anthology of science fiction short stories edited by Everett F. Bleiler and T. E. Dikty. An abridged edition was published in the UK by Grayson in 1956 under the title The Best Science Fiction Stories: Fifth Series. The stories had originally appeared in 1953 in the magazines Avon Science Fiction and Fantasy Reader, Fantasy and Science Fiction, Amazing Stories, Fantastic, Astounding and Galaxy Science Fiction.

== Contents ==
- Editors’ Preface, by Everett F. Bleiler & T. E. Dikty
- Icon of the Imagination, by Fritz Leiber
- "DP!", by Jack Vance
- "The Big Holiday", by Fritz Leiber
- "phttps://archive.org/stream/Amazing_Stories_v27n05_1953-06-07#page/n45/mode/2up The Collectors]", by G. Gordon Dewey & Max Dancey
- "One in Three Hundred", by J. T. McIntosh
- "Wonder Child", by Joseph Shallit
- "Crucifixus Etiam", by Walter M. Miller, Jr.
- "The Model of a Judge", by William Morrison
- "The Last Day", by Richard Matheson
- "Time Is the Traitor", by Alfred Bester
- "Lot", by Ward Moore
- "Yankee Exodus", by Ruth M. Goldsmith
- "What Thin Partitions", by Mark Clifton & Alex Apostolides
- "A Bad Day for Sales", by Fritz Leiber
- About the Authors
- Index, the Best Science-Fiction Stories: 1949-1954

== Reception ==
P. Schuyler Miller found the volume to be "no exception to the excellence of previous years." Groff Conklin said that "It is certainly not the 'best' of the 1953 output by a long shot, but it does contain some of the year's best", with Fritz Leiber's introduction "by far the best part".

== Sources ==
- Contento, William G. "Index to Science Fiction Anthologies and Collections". Archived from the original on 2008-01-06.
