= Dirk Vanden =

American novelist

Dirk Vanden (born Richard Fullmer; May 7, 1933 – October 21, 2014), was an American author and illustrator. He is considered the first gay Mormon writer and has been called a "pioneer of gay literature" by the Lambda Literary Review. A graduate of the University of Utah, his work appeared in ONE Magazine, Vector, and California Scene, as well as in Latter-Gay Saints: An Anthology of Gay Mormon Fiction. His novel I Want It All was the first book to explore San Francisco's leather subculture. His greatest success was his All trilogy: I Want It All, All or Nothing, and All Is Well. Vanden received a Lambda Literary Award for Gay Erotica in 2012 for the revision of this trilogy, All Together.

In spite of his success, Vanden, together with Richard Amory, was highly critical of the way editor Earl Kemp and publisher Greenleaf Classics treated his work, citing Greenleaf's non-payment of royalties, employment of editors not familiar with gay literature, and insistence on inserting graphic sex into his books as examples of their heavy-handed approach to LGBT publishing.

He died of cancer at his home in Carmichael, California in October 2014.

== Bibliography ==
- To Themselves Unknown
- Tom, Tom, the Piper’s Son (published as Who Killed Queen Tom?, 1969)
- Hatters and Hares (published as The Leather Queens, 1969; re-released as Down the Rabbit Hole)
- The Stag in the Tree (published as Leather, 1969)
- Exile in Paradise (published as Twin Orbs, 1969)
- I Want It All (1969)
- All Or Nothing (1970)
- All Is Well (1971)
- All of Me: A Gay Mystery (2010)
- It Was Too Soon Before…: The Unlikely Life, Untimely Death, and Unexpected Rebirth of Gay Pioneer, Dirk Vanden (2012)
