= Gay pulp fiction =

Genre of pulp fiction literature

Cover of 1968 gay pulp fiction novel Midtown Queen, by Julian Mark

Gay pulp fiction, or gay pulps, refers to printed works, primarily fiction, that include references to male homosexuality, specifically male gay sex, and that are cheaply produced, typically in paperback books made of wood pulp paper; lesbian pulp fiction is similar work about women. Michael Bronski, the editor of an anthology of gay pulp writing, notes in his introduction, "Gay pulp is not an exact term, and it is used somewhat loosely to refer to a variety of books that had very different origins and markets". People often use the term to refer to the "classic" gay pulps that were produced before about 1970, but it may also be used to refer to the gay erotica or pornography in paperback book or digest magazine form produced since that date.

== Beginning of gay pulps ==
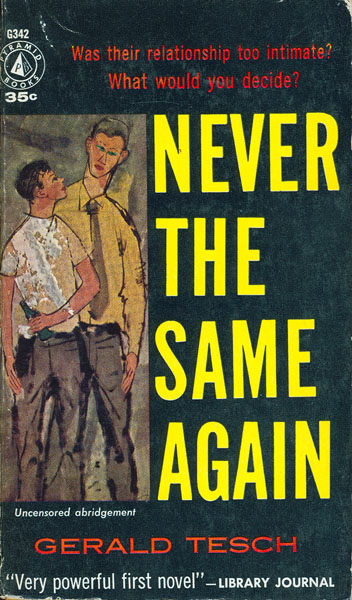
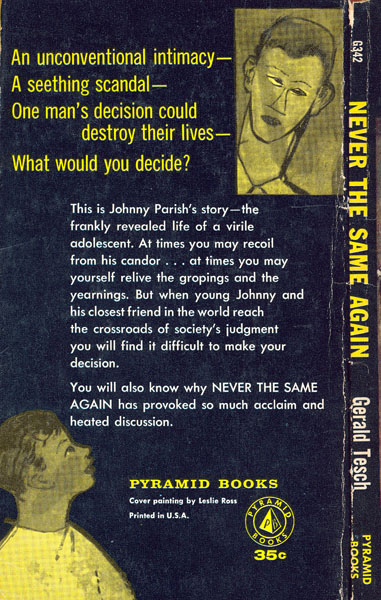
Many early gay pulps were reissues of literary novels with gay themes, such as this 1958 Pyramid Books edition of Never the Same Again.

Gay pulps are part of the expansion of cheap paperback books that began in the 1930s and "reached its full force in the early 1950s." Mainstream publishers packaged the cheap paperbacks to be sold in train and bus stations, dimestores, drugstores, grocery stores, and newsstands, to reach the market that had bought pulp magazines in the first half of the twentieth century. Designed to catch the eye, the paperback books featured vivid cover art and often dealt with taboo subjects: prostitution, rape, interracial romances, lesbianism, and male homosexuality. Michael Bronski has noted that lesbian pulp fiction were far more numerous and popular than those that dealt with male homosexuality; he attributes this difference to the fact that while both lesbian and heterosexual women read the lesbian pulps, a major part of the market for these novels was heterosexual men. According to Bronski, "The trajectory of the gay male pulps is very different. There was no burgeoning market for gay male novels in the 1950s because they apparently had little crossover appeal for a substantial heterosexual readership."

Still, some gay pulps were published by mainstream publishers throughout the 1950s and early 1960s. These were often reprints of literary novels that involved references to homosexuality, such as Charles Jackson's 1946 novel, The Fall of Valor, and Gore Vidal's 1948 novel, The City and the Pillar, which first appeared in paperback in 1950. Likewise, Blair Niles' 1931 novel Strange Brother appeared in paperback in 1952.

== First original gay pulp paperback ==
The first paperback original to deal with homosexuality was 1952's Men into Beasts, a nonfiction work by George Viereck. Viereck, a poet, was sent to prison during World War II for his work as a paid propaganda agent of Nazi Germany. Men into Beasts is a general memoir of the indignities and brutalities of life in prison, but a significant part of it deals with situational homosexuality and male rape in prison. The cover of the book features a discreetly posed nude man, on his knees in a prison cell, being beaten by two prison guards. The text on the back of the book blames prison riots on "homosexual slavery—inmates being forced to practice abnormal acts with sex deviates who roamed the prisons at will."

== Beginnings of sexually explicit gay pulp ==
Beginning around 1964, the more than a decade of challenges to U.S. censorship laws applied to literary novels such as Lady Chatterley's Lover, Portnoy's Complaint, and Naked Lunch had redefined legal standards for obscenity. Susan Stryker cites Tom Norman's bibliography of American gay erotic paperbacks to note that thirty gay paperback books were published in 1965, and that over a hundred were in 1966. Many of these publishers had their roots in publishing beefcake, or "male physique" magazines in the 1950s, precursors to explicit gay pornographic magazines.

Most of the new gay paperbacks were explicitly pornographic, writing designed to provoke sexual responses, rather than literary writing, and they came from small, gay presses, such as the Guild Press, Greenleaf Classics, and the Publisher's Export Company, rather than from mainstream national publishers. For example, Greenleaf (under editor Earl Kemp) published a series of erotic spy parodies called The Man from C.A.M.P., written by Victor J. Banis. Banis says once Kemp and Greenleaf proved how much of a market there was for this type of fiction, other publishers soon joined in.

Among "the more provocative titles and noms de plume" published in this decade include: Summer in Sodom, by Edwin Fey; Gay Whore, by Jack Love; Hollywood Homo, by Michael Starr; The Short Happy Sex Life of Stud Sorell, by Orlando Paris; It's a Gay, Gay, Gay, Gay World, by Guy Faulk; Gay on the Range, by Dick Dale; Queer Belles, by Percy Queen; and Gay Pals, by Peter Grande.

Sometimes, these past ephemera can become useful community history resources. As Susan Stryker and Michael Meeker note in a new preface to Lou Rand's The Gay Detective (1965), San Francisco area LGBT historians found that the paperback in question turned out to be a valuable document in describing past prominent if closeted social figures, ethnic conflicts over police corruption and the emergence of a narcotics underworld in their city, as well as referring to bygone LGBT venues.

== Major writers ==
Some of the titles issued by these presses in the late 1960s blurred the lines between literary gay fiction and pornography. While all of them include more explicit sexual content than literary novels or mainstream, non-sexual paperback fiction (Westerns, romances, etc.) of the time, some aspired to higher literary merit and include attempts at more careful characterizations, settings, and plots. Susan Stryker cites in this category Chris Davidson and Richard Amory, who both wrote for Greenleaf Classics. Davidson put gay porn twists on familiar genres: A Different Drum features sex between Yankee and Confederate soldiers in the American Civil War; Go Down, Aaron has a Jew subjected to sex sadism in the Third Reich; and Caves of Iron is about prison sex. Richard Amory, meanwhile, in the Song of the Loon has a Last of the Mohicans-type story, but with the lone frontiersman and the Indians having sex. Gay historian John Howard has identified Carl Corley as a similar writer of pulp pornography that was "more sober, more earnest", and that was usually set in Corley's native American South. Victor J. Banis wrote a gay detective series, The Man from C.A.M.P., whose novels feature Jackie Holmes as a gay international superspy. This series turns the popular, conventional spy-genre novel on its head.

== See also ==
- Lesbian pulp fiction
- LGBTQ literature
- Yaoi
