= Walter B. Gibson bibliography =

This is a complete list of books by Walter B. Gibson published during his lifetime and after his death.

== Magic ==
- Houdini's Escapes Harcourt, Brace 1930
- Houdini's Magic Harcourt, Brace 1932
- Houdini's Fabulous Magic Chilton Books 1961
- The Book of Secrets (1927)
- The World's Best Book of Magic
- Professional Magic for Amateurs
- Blackstone's Secrets of Magic
- Blackstone's Modern Card Tricks
- Thurston's 200 Tricks You Can Do (1926)
- Thurston's 200 More Tricks You Can Do (1927)
- Fooling the World (1928)
- The Thurston Magic Lessons (1928)
- The Official Know-It-All Guide Magic for Beginners: Your Absolute, Quintessential, All You Wanted to Know, Complete Guide, with Walter Gibson and Mike Shelley (2000)
- The Bunco Book (1928)
- The Magician's Manual (1933)
- The New Magician's Manual (1936)
- Magic Explained (1949)
- What's New in Magic (1956)
- The Original Houdini Scrapbook (1976)
- Magic for Beginners (Fell's Official Know-It-All Guides)
- Advanced Magic (Fell's Official Know-It-All Guides)
- Walter Gibson's Big Book of Magic for All Ages
- Magic With Science (1975)
- Mastering Magic: 100 Secrets of the Great Magicians
- Junior magic: Easy-to-learn tricks or magic made simple
- The Complete Illustrated Book of Close-Up Magic: Professional Techniques Fully Revealed by a Master Magician (1980)
- Complete Illustrated Book of Card Magic (1969)
- Professional Magic for Amateurs
- The Great Houdini's Book of Magic Tricks, Puzzles and Stunts
- Walter B. Gibson’s Encyclopedia of Magic and Conjuring’’ (1976)

== Occult ==
- The Complete Illustrated Book of the Psychic Sciences, a History, A Modern Survey, and How-to Instructions, Over 100 Illustrations, with Litzka R. Gibson
- Complete Illustrated Book of The Psychic Sciences, with Litzka R. Gibson
- Complete Illustrated Book of Divination & Prophecy, with Litzka R. Gibson
- The Mystic and Occult Arts - A Guide to Their Use in Daily Living (by the author of The Shadow), with Litzka R. Gibson
- The Mystic Fortune Teller with The Magic Square (1927)
- Encyclopaedia of Prophecy, with Litzka R. Gibson
- The Science of Numerology or What Numbers Mean to You (1927)
- Witchcraft: A History of the Black Art
- Hypnotism Through the Ages
- Hypnotism
- The Key to Hypnotism
- The Key to Yoga (1963)
- Dreams, Dreams, Dreams, Dreams, Dreams

== Games ==
- Backgammon (A 'Golden Hands' book)
- Hoyle's modern encyclopedia of card games: rules of all the basic games and popular variations (1974)
- Pinochle Is the Name of the Game (1975)
- Poker is the Name of the Game
- Poker: How to Play - How to Win
- Hoyle's Simplified Guide to the Popular Card Games
- Family Games America Plays
- 150 solitaire games

== Other ==
- Knots and How to Tie Them (1993)
- Fell's Super Power Memory: A Fell's Official Know-It-All Guide, with Harry Lorayne
- Rod Serling's Twilight Zone (1990 adaptation)
- Rod Serling's Twilight Zone Revisited
- Fell's guide to papercraft tricks, games, and puzzles
- The Key to Space Travel
- The Key to Astronomy

== The Shadow ==
=== Novels ===
- The Living Shadow (1931)
- Eyes of The Shadow (1931)
- The Shadow Laughs (1931)
- The Red Menace (1931)
- Gangdom's Doom (1931)
- The Death Tower (1932)
- The Silent Seven (1932)
- The Black Master (1932)
- Mobsmen on the Spot (1932)
- Hands in the Dark (1932)
- Double Z (1932)
- The Crime Cult (1932)
- The Blackmail Ring (1932)
- Hidden Death (1932)
- Green Eyes (1932)
- The Ghost Makers (1932)
- The Five Chameleons (1932)
- Dead Men Live (1932)
- The Romanoff Jewels (1932)
- Kings of Crime (1932)
- Shadowed Millions (1933)
- The Creeping Death (1933)
- The Shadow's Shadow (1933)
- Six Men of Evil (1933)
- Fingers of Death (1933)
- Murder Trail (1933)
- The Silent Death (1933)
- The Shadow's Justice (1933)
- The Golden Grotto (1933)
- The Death Giver (1933)
- The Red Blot (1933)
- The Ghost of the Manor (1933)
- The Living Joss (1933)
- The Silver Scourge (1933)
- The Black Hush (1933)
- The Isle of Doubt (1933)
- The Grove of Doom (1933)
- Master of Death (1933)
- Road of Crime (1933)
- The Death Triangle (1933)
- The Killer (1933)
- Mox (1933)
- The Crime Clinic (1933)
- Treasures of Death (1933)
- The Embassy Murders (1934)
- The Wealth Seeker (1934)
- The Black Falcon (1934)
- Gray Fist (1934)
- The Circle of Death (1934)
- The Green Box (1934)
- The Cobra (1934)
- Crime Circus (1934)
- Tower of Death (1934)
- Death Clew (1934)
- The Key (1934)
- The Crime Crypt (1934)
- Charg, Monster (1934)
- Chain of Death (1934)
- The Crime Master (1934)
- Gypsy Vengeance (1934)
- Spoils of The Shadow (1934)
- The Garaucan Swindle (1934)
- Murder Marsh (1934)
- The Death Sleep (1934)
- The Chinese Disks (1934)
- Doom on the Hill (1934)
- The Unseen Killer (1934)
- Cyro (1934)
- The Four Signets (1935)
- The Blue Sphinx (1935)
- The Plot Master (1935)
- The Dark Death (1935)
- Crooks Go Straight (1935)
- Bells of Doom (1935)
- Lingo (1935)
- The Triple Trail (1935)
- The Golden Quest (1935)
- The Third Skull (1935)
- Murder Every House (1935)
- The Condor (1935)
- The Fate Joss (1935)
- Atoms of Death (1935)
- The Man from Scotland Yard (1935)
- The Creeper (1935)
- Mardi Gras Mystery (1935)
- The London Crimes (1935)
- The Ribbon Clues (1935)
- The House That Vanished (1935)
- The Chinese Tapestry (1935)
- The Python (1935)
- Zemba (1935)
- The Case of Congressman Coyd (1935)
- The Ghost Murders (1936)
- Castle of Doom (1936)
- Death Rides the Skyway (1936)
- The North Woods Mystery (1936)
- The Voodoo Master (1936)
- The Third Shadow (1936)
- The Salamanders (1936)
- The Man from Shanghai (1936)
- The Gray Ghost (1936)
- City of Doom (1936)
- The Crime Oracle (1936)
- Murder Town (1936)
- The Yellow Door (1936)
- The Broken Napoleons (1936)
- The Sledge-Hammer Crimes (1936)
- Terror Island (1936)
- The Golden Masks (1936)
- Jibaro Death (1936)
- City of Crime (1936)
- Death by Proxy (1936)
- The Strange Disappearance of Joe Cardona (1936)
- The Seven Drops of Blood (1936)
- Intimidation, Inc. (1936)
- Vengeance Is Mine! (1937)
- Loot of Death (1937)
- Quetzel (1937)
- Death Token (1937)
- Murder House (1937)
- Washington Crime (1937)
- The Masked Headsman (1937)
- Treasure Trail (1937)
- Brothers of Doom (1937)
- The Shadow's Rival (1937)
- Crime, Insured (1937)
- House of Silence (1937)
- The Shadow Unmasks (1937)
- The Yellow Band (1937)
- Buried Evidence (1937)
- The Radium Murders (1937)
- The Keepers Gold (1937)
- Death Turrets (1937)
- Teeth of the Dragon (1937)
- The Sealed Box (1937)
- Racket Town (1937)
- The Crystal Buddha (1938)
- Hills of Death (1938)
- The Murder Master (1938)
- The Golden Pagoda (1938)
- Face of Doom (1938)
- Serpents of Siva (1938)
- Cards of Death (1938)
- The Hand (1938)
- Voodoo Trail (1938)
- The Rackets King (1938)
- Murder for Sale (1938)
- Death Jewels (1938)
- The Green Hoods (1938)
- Crime Over Boston (1938)
- The Dead Who Lived (1938)
- Vanished Treasure (1938)
- The Voice (1938)
- Chicago Crime (1938)
- Shadow Over Alcatraz (1938)
- Silver Skull (1939)
- Crime Rides the Sea (1939)
- Realm of Doom (1939)
- The Lone Tiger (1939)
- The Vindicator (1939)
- Death Ship (1939)
- Valley of Greed (1939)
- The Three Brothers (1939)
- Smugglers of Death (1939)
- City of Shadows (1939)
- Death from Nowhere (1939)
- The Isle of Gold (1939)
- Wizard of Crime (1939)
- The Crime Ray (1939)
- The Golden Master (1939)
- Castle of Crime (1939)
- The Masked Lady (1939)
- Ships of Doom (1939)
- City of Ghosts (1939)
- Shiwan Khan Returns (1939)
- House of Shadows (1939)
- Death Premium (1940)
- The Hooded Circle (1940)
- The Getaway Ring (1940)
- Voice of Death (1940)
- The Invincible Shiwan Khan (1940)
- The Veiled Prophet (1940)
- The Spy Ring (1940)
- Death in the Stars (1940)
- Masters of Death (1940)
- Scent of Death (1940)
- Q (1940)
- Gems of Doom (1940)
- Crime at Seven Oaks (1940)
- The Fifth Face (1940)
- Crime County (1940)
- The Wasp (1940)
- Crime Over Miami (1940)
- Xitli, God of Fire (1940)
- The Shadow, The Hawk, and The Skull (1940)
- Forgotten Gold (1941)
- The Wasp Returns (1941)
- The Chinese Primrose (1941)
- Mansion of Crime (1941)
- The Time Master (1941)
- The House on the Ledge (1941)
- The League of Death (1941)
- Crime Under Cover (1941)
- The Thunder King (1941)
- The Star of Delhi (1941)
- The Blur (1941)
- The Shadow Meets the Mask (1941)
- The Devil Master (1941)
- Garden of Death (1941)
- Dictator of Crime (1941)
- The Blackmail King (1941)
- Temple of Crime (1941)
- Murder Mansion (1941)
- Crime's Stronghold (1941)
- Alibi Trail (1942)
- The Book of Death (1942)
- Death Diamonds (1942)
- Vengeance Bay (1942)
- Formula for Crime (1942)
- Room of Doom (1942)
- The Jade Dragon (1942)
- The Northdale Mystery (1942)
- Twins of Crime (1942)
- The Devil's Feud (1942)
- Five Ivory Boxes (1942)
- Death About Town (1942)
- Legacy of Death (1942)
- Judge Lawless (1942)
- The Vampire Murders (1942)
- Clue for Clue (1942)
- Trail of Vengeance (1942)
- The Murdering Ghost (1942)
- The Hydra (1942)
- The Money Master (1942)
- The Museum Murders (1943)
- Death's Masquerade (1943)
- The Devil Monsters (1943)
- Wizard of Crime (1943)
- The Black Dragon (1943)
- The Robot Master (1943)
- Murder Lake (1943)
- Messenger of Death (1943)
- House of Ghosts (1943)
- King of the Black Market (1943)
- The Muggers (1943)
- Murder by Moonlight (1943)
- The Crystal Skull (1944)
- Syndicate of Death (1944)
- Toll of Death (1944)
- Crime Caravan (1944)
- Freak Show Murders (1944)
- Voodoo Death (1944)
- Town of Hate (1944)
- Death in the Crystal (1944)
- The Chest of Chu-Chan (1944)
- The Shadow Meets The Mask (1944)
- Fountain of Death (1944)
- No Time for Murder (1944)
- Guardian of Death (1945)
- Merry Mrs. MacBeth (1945)
- Five Keys to Crime (1945)
- Death has Gray Eyes (1945)
- Tear-drops of Buddha (1945)
- Three Stamps of Death (1945)
- The Mask of Mephisto (1945)
- Murder by Magic (1945)
- The Taiwan Joss (1945)
- A Quarter of Eight (1945)
- The White Skulls (1945)
- The Stars Promise Death (1945)
- The Banshee Murders (1946)
- Crime Out of Mind (1946)
- Mother Goose Murders (1946)
- Crime Over Casco (1946)
- The Curse of Thoth (1946)
- Alibi Trail (1946)
- Malmordo (1946)
- Jade Dragon (1948)
- Dead Man's Chest (1948)
- The Magigal's Mystery (1949)
- The Black Circle (1949)
- The Whispering Eyes (1949)
- Return of The Shadow (1963)

=== Short stories ===
- "Riddle of the Rangoon Ruby" (1979)
- "Blackmail Bay" (1980)

== Biff Brewster series ==
1. Brazilian Gold Mine Mystery (1960)
2. Mystery of the Mexican Treasure (1961)
3. Mystery of the Ambush in India (1962)
4. Egyptian Scarab Mystery (1963)
5. Mystery of the Alpine Pass (1965)

== Pulp magazines ==
- Tales of Magic and Mystery (December 1927 – April 1928) as editor
- True Strange Stories (1929) as editor

== Comic books ==
=== Avon Publications ===
- Robotmen of the Lost Planet #1 (1952)
- Rocket to the Moon #1 (1951)
- Space Detective #1 (1951)
- Space Thrillers #1 (1954)

=== Charlton Comics ===
- Racket Squad in Action #1–4, 16 (1952–1955)
- Space Adventures #4 (1953)
- Space Western #40–45 (1952–1953)

=== DC Comics ===
- Detective Comics #500 (1981)
- Strange Adventures #22 (1952)

=== EC Comics ===
- Blackstone #1 (1947)

=== Lev Gleason Publications ===
- Crime Does Not Pay #87–103 (1950–1951)

=== Marvel Comics ===
- Blackstone the Magician #2–4 (1948)

=== Parents' Magazine Press ===
- Calling All Boys #3–4 (1946)

=== Street & Smith ===
- Bill Barnes, America's Air Ace Comics #v1#7 (1942)
- Devil Dogs Comics #1 (1942)
- Doc Savage Comics #v1#1 (1940)
- Ghost Breakers #1–2 (1948)
- Shadow Comics #v1#2–#v1#11, #v2#1–#v2#10, #v2#12, #v3#1–#v3#12, #v4#1–#v4#11, #v5#1–#v5#12, #v6#1–#v6#6, #v6#8, #v9#3 (1940–1949)
- Super-Magician Comics #v2#2, #v2#8, #v3#2 (1943–1944)

=== Vital Publications ===
- Jim Solar Space Sheriff and Dara Starr in Spacettes of the Sky #1 (1954)
- Jim Solar Space Sheriff Defeats the Moon Missile Men #1 (1957)
- Jim Solar Space Sheriff in the "Battle for Mars" #1 (1953)
