= T. E. Dikty =

American novelist (1920–1991)

Thaddeus Maxim Eugene (Ted) Dikty
- Dikty as caricatured in 1958
- Born: June 16, 1920
- Died: October 11, 1991 (aged 71)
- Occupation: Anthologist
- Spouse: Julian May (m. 1953)
- Writing career
- Genre: Science fiction

Thaddeus Maxim Eugene "Ted" Dikty (June 16, 1920 – October 11, 1991) was an American editor who also played a role as one of the earliest science fiction anthologists, and as a publisher.

== Early career ==
In 1947, Dikty joined Shasta Publishers as managing editor. With E. F. Bleiler he started the first "Best of the Year" science fiction anthologies, called The Best Science Fiction, which ran from 1949 until 1957.

In 1953, he married writer Julian May, whom he had met at a science fiction convention in Ohio. Both of them worked for Chicago-area publishers; in 1957 the two started Publication Associates, an editorial service which created books (from writing to completion of bound copies) for specialty children's publishers who sold primarily to the school and library markets: May did the writing, and Dikty served as designer and producer. In the early 1970s Dikty and partners started a small press, FAX Collector's Editions, which reprinted selected pulp-era (and earlier) SF stories and novels, and had some commercial success with reprints of work by Robert E. Howard (creator of Conan the Barbarian).

== Starmont House and death ==
In 1976, after the family had moved to West Linn, Oregon, Dikty founded the specialty publisher Starmont House, which published non-fiction about the science fiction field. At the time of his death in 1991 at the age of 71, Dikty and May had moved to Mercer Island, Washington; his daughter, Barbara Dikty, had already been made president of Starmont House, Inc. by then.

In September 2013, he was posthumously named to the First Fandom Hall of Fame in a ceremony at the 71st World Science Fiction Convention.

== Bibliography ==
=== The Best Science Fiction ===
- The Best Science Fiction Stories: 1949 (with Everett F. Bleiler)
- The Best Science Fiction Stories: 1950 (with Everett F. Bleiler)
- The Best Science Fiction Stories: 1951 (with Everett F. Bleiler)
- The Best Science Fiction Stories: 1952 (with Everett F. Bleiler)
- The Best Science Fiction Stories: 1953 (with Everett F. Bleiler)
- The Best Science Fiction Stories: 1954 (with Everett F. Bleiler)
- Year's Best Science Fiction Novels: 1952 (with Everett F. Bleiler)
- Year's Best Science Fiction Novels: 1953 (with Everett F. Bleiler)
- Year's Best Science Fiction Novels: 1954 (with Everett F. Bleiler)
- The Best Science Fiction Stories and Novels: 1955
- The Best Science Fiction Stories and Novels: 1956
- The Best Science Fiction Stories and Novels: Ninth Series (1958)

=== Others ===
- Imagination Unlimited (with Everett F. Bleiler, 1952)
- Every Boy's Book of Outer Space Stories (1960)
- Great Science Fiction Stories About Mars (1966)
- Great Science Fiction Stories About the Moon (1967)
