= Robert Abernathy =

American writer

- Born: June 6, 1924
- Died: April 6, 1990 (aged 65)
- Occupation: Science fiction author

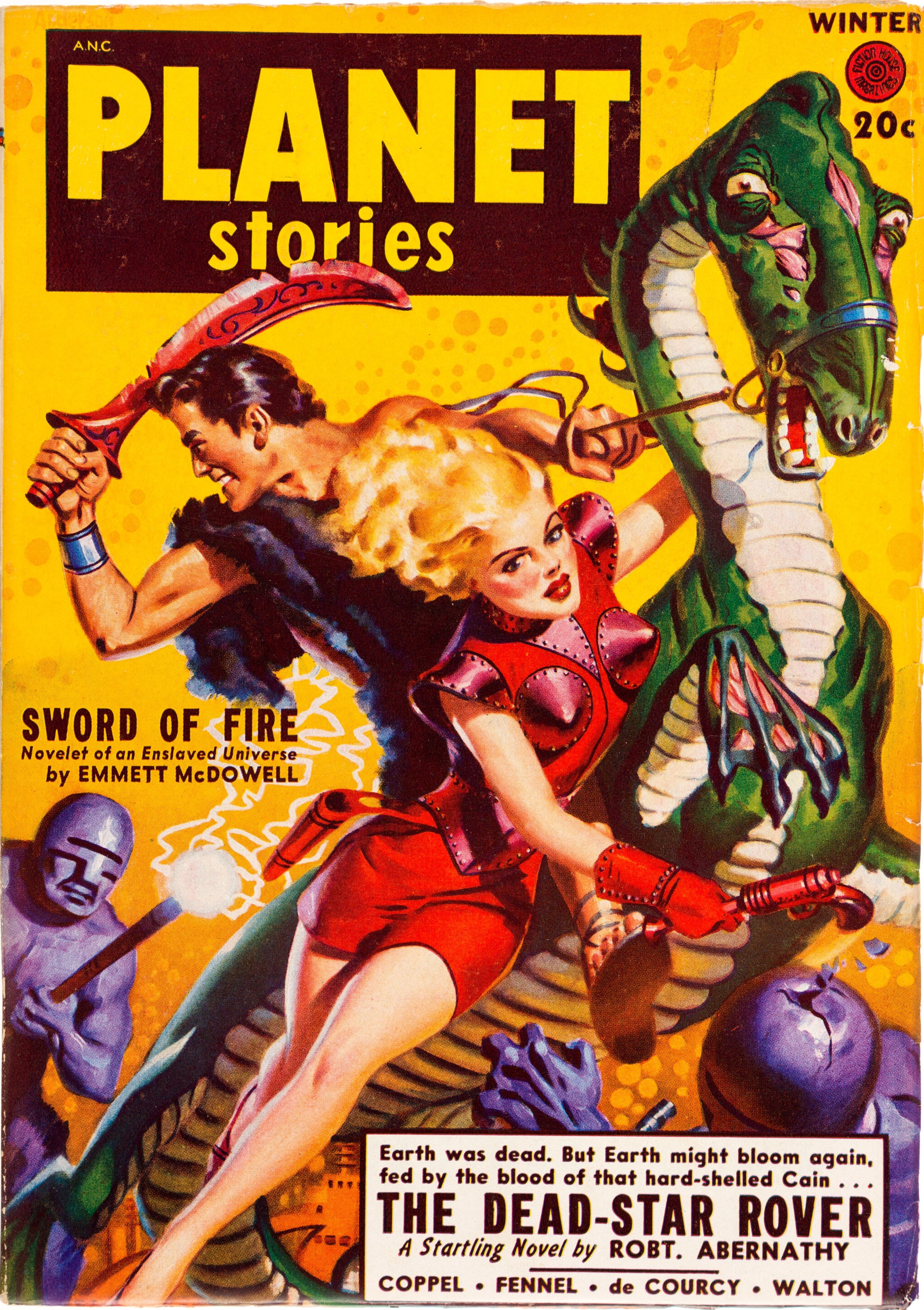
Abernathy's novella "The Dead-Star Rover" was cover-featured on the Winter 1949 issue of Planet Stories

Robert Abernathy (June 6, 1924 – April 6, 1990) was an American science fiction author during the 1940s and 1950s. He was known primarily for his short stories which were published in many of the pulp magazines that flourished during the Golden Age of Science Fiction. Many of his stories have been included in anthologies of classic science fiction such as the French Les Vingt Meilleurs Récits de science-fiction edited by Hubert Juin.

== Selected stories ==
- "Peril of the Blue World" in Planet Stories, Winter 1942
- "Heritage" in Astounding, June 1942
- "The Canal Builders" in Astounding, January 1945
- "Heritage" (novella) in Astounding, June 1947
- "The Dead-Star Rover" in Planet Stories, Winter 1949
- "Strange Exodus" in Planet Stories, Fall 1950
- "The Rotifers" in if, March 1953
- "Axolotl" (also published as "Deep Space") in F&SF, January 1954
- "Heirs Apparent" (novella) in F&SF, June 1954
- "Pyramid" (novella) in Astounding, July 1954
- "Single Combat" in F&SF, January 1955
- "Junior" in Galaxy, January 1956
- "Grandma's Lie Soap" in Fantastic Universe, February 1956
