= Worlds Beyond (magazine) =

American digest magazine of science fiction and fantasy fiction

Worlds Beyond was an American digest magazine of science fiction and fantasy fiction in 1950 and 1951. The magazine only issued three monthly issues, from December 1950 to February 1951, but is notable for having printed stories by Cyril M. Kornbluth, Jack Vance, Mack Reynolds, Graham Greene, John Christopher, Lester del Rey, Judith Merril, William Tenn and others.

Worlds Beyond was published by Hillman Periodicals and was edited by Damon Knight. The cover price was 25 cents and each edition had 128 pages.

The first two issues of the magazine were styled Worlds Beyond Science-Fantasy Fiction. In its final issue, it was styled Worlds Beyond: A Magazine of Science-Fantasy Fiction.

== See also ==
- Rock Diver, a short story by Harry Harrison that debuted in this magazine

== Sources ==
- Aldiss, Brian; Wingrove, David (1986). Trillion Year Spree: The History of Science Fiction. London: Gollancz. ISBN 0-575-03943-4.
- Carter, Paul A. (1977). The Creation of Tomorrow: Fifty Years of Magazine Science Fiction. New York: Columbia University Press. ISBN 0-231-04211-6.
- Clute, John; Nicholls, Peter (1993). The Encyclopedia of Science Fiction. New York: St. Martin's Press, Inc. ISBN 0-312-09618-6.
