= Hubert Juin =

Belgian poet, novelist, essayist and literary critic

- Born: Hubert Loescher; 5 June 1926; Athus (Belgian Lorraine)
- Died: 3 June 1987 (aged 60); Paris
- Occupation(s): Writer; Poet

Hubert Juin, pseudonym for Hubert Loescher, (5 June 1926 – 3 June 1987) was a Francophone Belgian poet, novelist, essayist and literary critic.

== Works (selection) ==
=== Novels ===
- 1978: Les Hameaux Verviers, Marabout, (with a preface by André Dhôtel), cycle of five novels consisting of:
  - 1958: Les Sangliers, Éditions du Seuil; reprint by Labor, 1991 ISBN 9782804006280
  - La Cimenterie
  - Chaperon rouge
  - Le Repas chez Marguerite, reprint by Labor, 1983 ISBN 9782804001742
  - Les Trois cousines

=== Poetry ===
- 1971: Le Cinquième Poème, Les Éditeurs français réunis
- 1976: Les Guerriers du Chalco, Éditions Belfond, ISBN 978-2-7144-1063-4
- 1987: La Destruction des remparts, Belfond
- 1957: Le Livre des déserts, Falaize

=== Essais ===
- 1956: Les Bavards, Le Seuil (series "Pierres Vives"), ISBN 978-2-02-002581-2, 978-2871321705
- 1956: Pouchkine, Éditions Seghers
- 1956: Aimé Césaire, poète noir, Présence Africaine
- 1957: Léon Bloy, Éditions de la Colombe
- 1958: Joë Bousquet, Seghers, in collaboration with Suzanne André and Gaston Massat
- 1960: Aragon, Éditions Gallimard
- 1962: Chronique sentimentale, Mercure de France
- 1968: Les Libertinages de la raison, Belfond
- 1968: Les Incertitudes du réel, Brussels, Sodi
- 1969: Charles Van Lerberghe, Seghers
- 1970: 369 Édition spéciale
- 1970: Charles Nodier, Seghers
- 1972: Écrivains de l'avant-siècle, Seghers
- 1974: Barbey d'Aurevilly, Seghers
- 1975: André Hardellet, Seghers
- 1986: Victor Hugo, - Prix quinquennal de l'essai de la Communauté française de Belgique
- 2007: Célébration du grand-père, Éditions Weyrich
- 2010 Lectures du XIXe - tomes I et II, Paris, Christian Bourgois éditeur

=== Anthologies composed and presented by Hubert Juin ===
- 1957: Univers de la science-fiction, sixteen short stories, Club des libraires de France
- 1964: Les Vingt Meilleurs Récits de science-fiction, Éditions Marabout
- 1965: Récits fantastiques et contes nocturnes, Le Livre-club du libraire
