= Frederick Fell Publishers, Inc. =

Frederick Fell Publishers
- Founded: 1943
- Founder: Frederick Fell
- Country of origin: United States
- Headquarters location: Hollywood, Florida
- Publication types: Books
- Official website: www.lifetime-books.com

Frederick Fell Publishers, Inc. is an independent American publishing company specializing in self-help books in genres such as business, entertainment, children, health, and cooking. Their motto is "A World of Books That Fill A Need".

They have published titles such as Demystifying Business With Cookies And Elephants and So Eat, My Darling: A Guide to the Yiddish Kitchen. Many of their titles fall in the wide range of Fell’s Official Know-It-All Guide, with titles such as Fell’s Official Know-It-All Guide: How to Help Your Child Excel at Math and Fell’s Official Know-It-All Guide to Advanced Hypnotism. Fell has published books by notable authors like Og Mandino. They also serve as wholesalers and distributors for several other publishers.

The publishing house was established by Frederick Fell in August 1943 on New York's Fourth Avenue, although the company is currently located in Hollywood, Florida. A protest over a book caused a bomb scare in 1952 when the founder received a ticking package in his office.

In the 1980's, the company evolved into Lifetime Books, and the offices were established in Florida. After a lawsuit with author Herbert L. Becker over copyright infringement involving a magic book featuring David Copperfield, the entire company, all assets, and publishing rights were transferred to the plaintiff. .
