= Clip joint =

Customer-deceiving stripclub or nightclub

A clip joint is an establishment, usually a strip club or night club (often claiming to offer adult entertainment or bottle service), in which customers are tricked into paying far above market prices for low-grade goods or services—or sometimes, nothing—in return. Typically, clip joints suggest the possibility of sex, charge inflated prices for watered-down alcoholic drinks, and then throw out customers when they become unwilling or unable to spend more money. The products and services offered may be illegal, allowing the establishment to maintain the scam with little fear of punishment from law enforcement, since its victims cannot report the venue without admitting that they broke the law. Even when victims have broken no laws, they may be too embarrassed to seek legal recourse.

In the United States, clip joints were widespread during the national Prohibition of alcohol from 1920 to 1933, and the practice later became outlawed. For instance, the New York State Liquor Authority imposes penalties against any licensed premises permitting such conduct. Clip joints still operate openly in some areas of the world, such as Shanghai, Las Vegas, Soho and Kabukichō, where they prey on visiting tourists.

== Description ==
A typical scenario involves a beautiful woman (typically either a local or claiming to be) who approaches the "mark", typically a young adult male tourist, and recommends a "favorite local" bar or club. Alternatively, a clip joint employee waits near a legitimate club, and invites passing pedestrians into a VIP area of the clip joint. The potential customers are led to believe that the person works for the nearby club, though they may not explicitly say so. The man is usually seated at a table and joined by a "hostess", who might or might not order drinks.

Whether or not any "services" are performed or drinks are ordered has little bearing on the outlandish bill received at the end of the night. Bills are commonly hundreds of, if not over a thousand, dollars, listing items like a "hostess fee" or "service charge" that were not originally mentioned to the customer. The arrival of the bill typically corresponds with the arrival of a few large bouncers to ensure payment, sometimes leading the victim to an ATM to retrieve the money.

The beautiful woman who originally lured the mark to the location often makes an excuse and leaves prior to the arrival of the bill. If confronted, the establishment claims that they have no connection with the woman and indicates that she arrived with the man, and as such the man is responsible for all of the items on the bill.

Once inside, drinks are usually non-alcoholic (as the venues usually do not have a license) or watered down and overpriced with no prices listed on the menu. Unrequested companions may also arrive at the table.

== In the United Kingdom ==
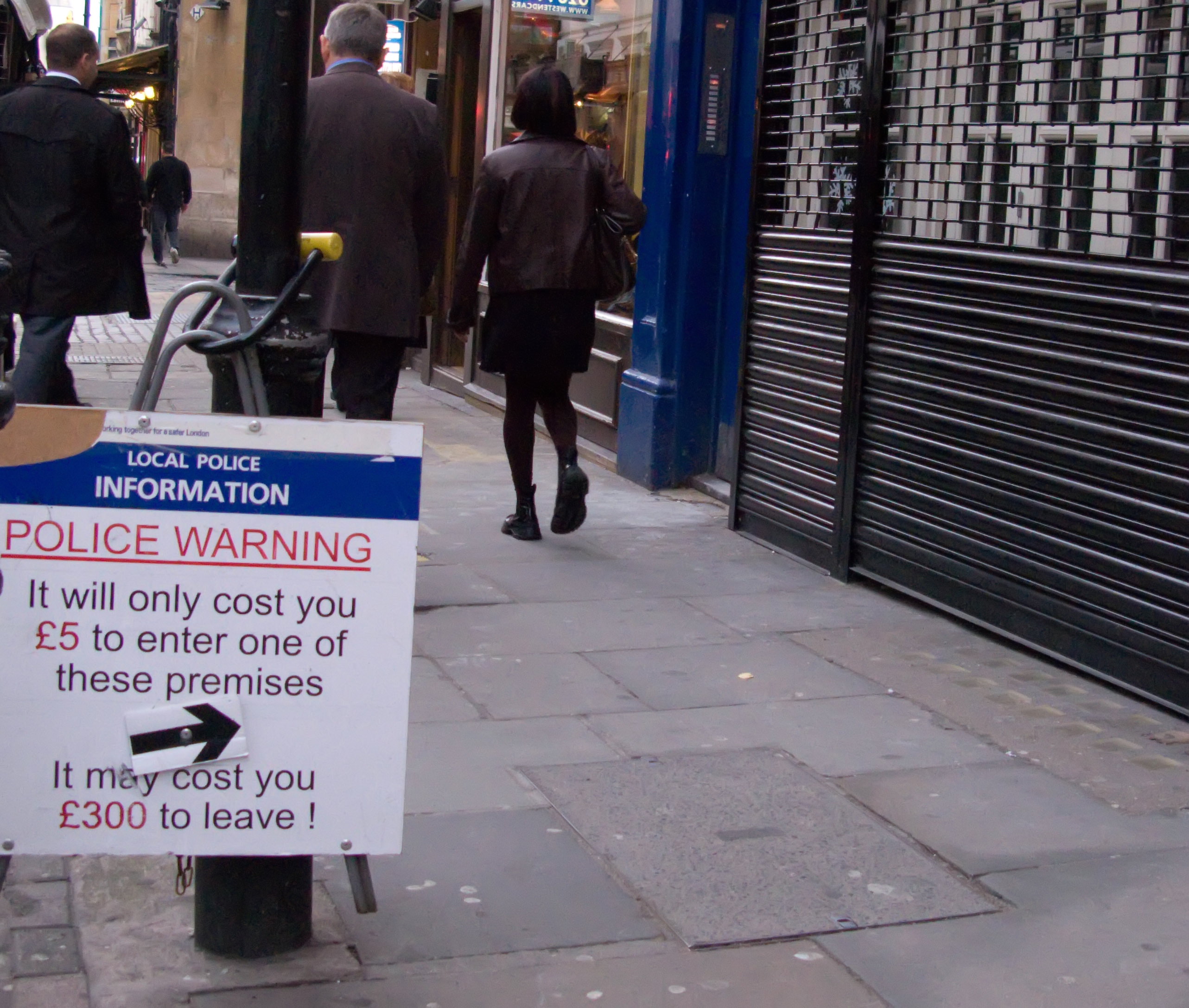
Police warning sign in Soho, 2008: "It will only cost you £5 to enter one of these premises. It may cost you £300 to leave!"

A number of clip joints (or "near beer bars") still operate in London's Soho area, alongside legitimate strip bars. Since 2007, the London Local Authorities Act reclassified clip joints as sex establishments, meaning that they required licences, closing a loophole where these businesses did not need a licence to operate because they did not serve food or alcohol or provide entertainment. In 2009, two people were jailed for 36 and 14 months respectively after threatening an undercover police officer in a Soho clip joint.

== In Japan ==
Bottakuri (ぼったくり, "rip-off") clubs have been a small but persistent problem in Japan, especially Tokyo's Kabukicho district. After complaints had surged tenfold in 2015, police began to crack down. In a mid-2015 sweep by the Tokyo Metropolitan Police, six hostess clubs were found to have charged as much as 2.6 million yen (about US$21,000, at the time) for one evening's visit by nine male customers.

== Bottle service clubs ==
The Manhattan bottle service club Arena was sued in 2007 for their version of the clip joint scam. In December 2007, a patron knowingly purchased a $350 bottle of vodka, but was not told of a three-bottle minimum. At the end of the night, he was presented with a $1050 tab that included two unordered bottles. When he refused to pay, the Arena bouncers beat him up. The patron agreed to get money from an ATM, but after the bouncers escorted him two blocks to a machine, his debit card was declined. The bouncers then dragged him back to the bar, where he was held until police arrived. He was arrested for theft of services but the charges were dismissed, and he later sued the club for $2 million.

== Cultural references ==
The 1937 crime film Marked Woman, starring Bette Davis and Humphrey Bogart, portrays a clip joint. Other films featuring clip joints include Manpower, Lullaby of Broadway, The Asphalt Jungle and Porky's.

The Fabulous Clipjoint is the first novel by science fiction and mystery writer Fredric Brown.

In Tennessee Williams' Streetcar Named Desire, in the opening scene, a sailor is warned against visiting the Four Deuces as it is a clip joint.
