= Isaac Asimov Presents The Great SF Stories 6 (1944) =

- First edition cover
- Editors: Isaac Asimov; Martin H. Greenberg
- Cover artist: Oliviero Berni
- Language: English
- Series: Isaac Asimov Presents The Great SF Stories
- Genre: Science fiction
- Publisher: DAW Books
- Publication date: December 1981
- Publication place: United States
- Media type: Print (hardback & paperback)
- Preceded by: Isaac Asimov Presents The Great SF Stories 5 (1943)
- Followed by: Isaac Asimov Presents The Great SF Stories 7 (1945)

Isaac Asimov Presents The Great SF Stories 6 (1944) is the sixth volume of Isaac Asimov Presents The Great SF Stories, which is a series of short story collections, edited by Isaac Asimov and Martin H. Greenberg, which attempts to list the great science fiction stories from the Golden Age of Science Fiction. They date the Golden Age as beginning in 1939 and lasting until 1963. The book was later reprinted as the second half of Isaac Asimov Presents The Golden Years of Science Fiction, Third Series with the first half being Isaac Asimov Presents The Great SF Stories 5 (1943). This volume was originally published by DAW books in December 1981.

== Contents ==
- "Far Centaurus" by A. E. van Vogt
- "Deadline" by Cleve Cartmill
- "The Veil of Astellar" by Leigh Brackett
- "Sanity" by Fritz Leiber
- "Invariant" by John R. Pierce
- "City" by Clifford D. Simak (different story from the novel of the same name)
- "Arena" by Fredric Brown
- "Huddling Place" by Clifford D. Simak
- "Kindness" by Lester del Rey
- "Desertion" by Clifford D. Simak
- "When the Bough Breaks" by Lewis Padgett
- "Killdozer!" by Theodore Sturgeon
- "No Woman Born" by C. L. Moore
