= Veruka =

Nightclub

Coordinates: 40.7241°N 74.0046°W

Veruka was a nightclub in Manhattan, owned by Noel Ashman. The club operated between January 1997 and June 2004, and was known for its strict door policy and celebrity patrons.

== History ==
The name Veruka was derived from Veruca Salt, the character of the story Charlie and the Chocolate Factory. Veruka was located on Broome Street at Sixth Avenue. It had a multi-level lounge and was one of New York's first clubs to have bottle service. In 2001, designer Todd Oldham redesigned the club. Hip-hop songwriter John Forté (of the Fugees) was among the club's celebrity DJs.

Celebrity regulars included Sean Penn, Ben Affleck, Leonardo DiCaprio, Mark Wahlberg, Cuba Gooding Jr., Nicolas Cage, Debbie Harry, Derek Jeter, Denis Leary, John Waters, Martin Sheen, and Sarah Jessica Parker, and was a popular location for the New York Yankees.

Owner Noel Ashman opened a new club, The Leonora, in Chelsea in August 2014. Ashman described The Leonora as a modernized version of Veruka.
