= Isaac Asimov Presents The Great SF Stories 4 (1942) =

1942 anthology edited by Isaac Asimov and Martin H. Greenberg

- First edition cover
- Editors: Isaac Asimov; Martin H. Greenberg
- Cover artist: Thomas Tafuri
- Language: English
- Series: Isaac Asimov Presents The Great SF Stories
- Genre: Science fiction
- Publisher: DAW Books
- Publication date: October 1980
- Publication place: United States
- Media type: Print (hardback & paperback)
- Preceded by: Isaac Asimov Presents The Great SF Stories 3 (1941)
- Followed by: Isaac Asimov Presents The Great SF Stories 5 (1943)

Isaac Asimov Presents The Great SF Stories 4 (1942) is a science fiction anthology edited by Isaac Asimov and Martin H. Greenberg. It is the fourth volume of Isaac Asimov Presents The Great SF Stories, a series of short story collections that attempts to list the great science fiction stories from the Golden Age of Science Fiction. They date the Golden Age as beginning in 1939 and lasting until 1963. The book was later reprinted as the second half of Isaac Asimov Presents The Golden Years of Science Fiction, Second Series with the first half being Isaac Asimov Presents The Great SF Stories 3 (1941). This volume was originally published by DAW books in 1980.

== Contents ==
- "The Star Mouse" by Fredric Brown
- "The Wings of Night" by Lester del Rey
- "Co-Operate - Or Else!", by A. E. Van Vogt
- "Foundation" by Isaac Asimov
- "The Push of a Finger" by Alfred Bester
- "Asylum" by A. E. van Vogt
- "Proof" by Hal Clement
- "Nerves" by Lester del Rey
- "Barrier" by Anthony Boucher
- "The Twonkey" by Lewis Padgett and C. L. Moore
- "QRM-Interplanetary" by George O. Smith
- "The Weapon Shop" by A. E. van Vogt
- "Mimic" by Donald A. Wollheim
