= Isaac Asimov Presents The Great SF Stories 7 (1945) =

1982 short story collection edited by Isaac Asimov and Martin H. Greenberg

- First edition cover
- Editors: Isaac Asimov; Martin H. Greenberg
- Cover artist: Antonio Bernal
- Language: English
- Series: Isaac Asimov Presents The Great SF Stories
- Genre: Science fiction
- Publisher: DAW Books
- Publication date: July 1982
- Publication place: United States
- Media type: Print (hardback & paperback)
- Preceded by: Isaac Asimov Presents The Great SF Stories 6 (1944)
- Followed by: Isaac Asimov Presents The Great SF Stories 8 (1946)

Isaac Asimov Presents The Great SF Stories 7 (1945) is an English language science fiction short story collection, edited by Isaac Asimov and Martin H. Greenberg. It is part of a series which attempts to list the great science fiction stories from the Golden Age of Science Fiction. They date the Golden Age as beginning in 1939 and lasting until 1963. The book was later reprinted as the first half of Isaac Asimov Presents The Golden Years of Science Fiction, Fourth Series with the second half being Isaac Asimov Presents The Great SF Stories 8 (1946).

This volume was originally published by DAW books in July 1982.

== Stories ==
- "The Waveries" by Fredric Brown
- "The Piper's Son" by Lewis Padgett
- "Wanted—An Enemy" by Fritz Leiber
- "Blind Alley" by Isaac Asimov
- "Correspondence Course" by Raymond F. Jones
- "First Contact" by Murray Leinster
- "The Vanishing Venusians" by Leigh Brackett
- "Into Thy Hands" by Lester del Rey
- "Camouflage" by Henry Kuttner
- "The Power" by Murray Leinster
- "Giant Killer" by A. Bertram Chandler
- "What You Need" by Henry Kuttner (made into an episode of TV series The Twilight Zone of the same name)
- "De Profundis" by Murray Leinster
- "Pi in the Sky" by Fredric Brown

== Reception ==
Isaac Asimov Presents The Great SF Stories 7 came in 14th in the 1983 Locus Award for Best Anthology.
