= Isaac Asimov Presents The Great SF Stories 8 (1946) =

1982 science fiction story collection edited by Isaac Asimov and Martin H. Greenberg

- First edition cover
- Editors: Isaac Asimov; Martin H. Greenberg
- Cover artist: Oliviero Berni
- Language: English
- Series: Isaac Asimov Presents The Great SF Stories
- Genre: Science fiction
- Publisher: DAW Books
- Publication date: November 1982
- Publication place: United States
- Media type: Print (hardback & paperback)
- Preceded by: Isaac Asimov Presents The Great SF Stories 7 (1945)
- Followed by: Isaac Asimov Presents The Great SF Stories 9 (1947)

Isaac Asimov Presents The Great SF Stories 8 (1946) is an English language science fiction story collection, edited by Isaac Asimov and Martin H. Greenberg. It is part of a series which attempts to list the great science fiction stories from the Golden Age of Science Fiction. They date the Golden Age as beginning in 1939 and lasting until 1963. The book was later reprinted as the second half of Isaac Asimov Presents The Golden Years of Science Fiction, Fourth Series with the first half being Isaac Asimov Presents The Great SF Stories 7 (1945).

This volume was originally published by DAW books in November 1982.

== Stories ==
- "A Logic Named Joe" by Will F. Jenkins
- "Memorial" by Theodore Sturgeon
- "Loophole" by Arthur C. Clarke
- "The Nightmare" by Chan Davis
- "Rescue Party" by Arthur C. Clarke
- "Placet is a Crazy Place" by Fredric Brown
- "Conqueror's Isle" by Nelson S. Bond
- "Lorelei of the Red Mist" by Ray Bradbury and Leigh Brackett
- "The Million Year Picnic" by Ray Bradbury
- "The Last Objective" by Paul A. Carter
- "Meihem in ce Klasrum" by Dolton Edwards
- "Vintage Season" by Lawrence O'Donnell
- "Evidence" by Isaac Asimov
- "Absalom" by Henry Kuttner
- "Mewhu's Jet" by Theodore Sturgeon
- "Technical Error" by Arthur C. Clarke

== Reception ==
Isaac Asimov Presents The Great SF Stories 8 came in 13th in the 1983 Locus Award for Best Anthology.
