= Isaac Asimov Presents The Great SF Stories 5 (1943) =

- First edition cover
- Editors: Isaac Asimov; Martin H. Greenberg
- Cover artist: Thomas Tafuri
- Language: English
- Series: Isaac Asimov Presents The Great SF Stories
- Genre: Science fiction
- Publisher: DAW Books
- Publication date: March 1981
- Publication place: United States
- Media type: Print (hardback & paperback)
- Preceded by: Isaac Asimov Presents The Great SF Stories 4 (1942)
- Followed by: Isaac Asimov Presents The Great SF Stories 6 (1944)

Isaac Asimov Presents The Great SF Stories 5 (1943) is the fifth volume of Isaac Asimov Presents The Great SF Stories, which is a series of short story collections, edited by Isaac Asimov and Martin H. Greenberg, which attempts to list the great science fiction stories from the Golden Age of Science Fiction. They date the Golden Age as beginning in 1939 and lasting until 1963. The book was later reprinted as the first half of Isaac Asimov Presents The Golden Years of Science Fiction, Third Series with the second half being Isaac Asimov Presents The Great SF Stories 6 (1944). This volume was originally published by DAW books in March 1981.

== Contents ==
- "The Cave" by P. Schuyler Miller
- "The Halfling" by Leigh Brackett
- "Mimsy Were the Borogoves" by Lewis Padgett
- "Q.U.R." by Anthony Boucher
- "Clash by Night" by Lawrence O'Donnell
- "Exile" by Edmond Hamilton
- "Daymare" by Fredric Brown
- "Doorway into Time" by C. L. Moore
- "The Storm" by A. E. van Vogt
- "The Proud Robot" by Lewis Padgett
- "Symbiotica" by Eric Frank Russell
- "The Iron Standard" by Lewis Padgett
