= Unknown Worlds of Science Fiction =

1970s American black-and-white, science fiction comics magazine

- Issue #6 (Nov. 1975), cover art by Frank Brunner.

Publication information
- Publisher: Curtis Magazines
- Schedule: Bimonthly
- Format: Ongoing series
- Genre: Science fiction
- Publication date: January 1975 – November 1976
- No. of issues: 6 plus an annual

Unknown Worlds of Science Fiction was a 1970s American black-and-white, science fiction comics magazine published by Marvel Comics' parent company, Magazine Management.

The anthology title featured original stories and literary adaptations by writers and artists including Frank Brunner, Howard Chaykin, Gene Colan, Gerry Conway, Richard Corben, Bruce Jones, Gray Morrow, Denny O'Neil, Roy Thomas, and others, as well as non-fiction articles about science fiction and interviews with such authors as Alfred Bester, Frank Herbert, Larry Niven, and A. E. van Vogt, some of whom had their works adapted here.

== Publication history ==
The black-and-white, science fiction comics magazine Unknown Worlds of Science Fiction ran six bimonthly issues (cover-dated January–November 1975), plus one annual publication, Unknown Worlds Of Science Fiction Giant Size Special Issue #1 (1976). It was published by Magazine Management, at the time the parent company of Marvel Comics, and was cover-branded with the logo of its distributor, Curtis Circulation. Utilizing many Marvel writers and artists, as well as other creators, it was launched following the cancellation of Marvel's 1973-74 comic book SF anthology Worlds Unknown.

A framing device throughout the series featured an old curio dealer who presented his shop's visitors with dramas captured in "slow glass", a concept that series editor Roy Thomas and writer Tony Isabella credited in the magazine to writer Bob Shaw.

=== Premiere ===
The premiere issue featured both new material and a number of reprints from fanzines and alternative comics of the era: Writer-artist Neal Adams' "A View From Without...", from Phase #1 (1971); "Smash Gordon in 'A Funny Thing Happened on the Way to Mongo'" by writer-artist Frank Brunner, from Heritage #1a (1972); "Savage World", by writer Wally Wood, pencilers Al Williamson, Angelo Torres, and Roy Krenkel, and inkers Williamson, Torres, and Frank Frazetta, from witzend #1 (1966); and "Hey Buddy, Can You Lend Me a...", by writer-artist Michael Kaluta, from Scream Door (Asian Flu) #1 (1971).

In addition to the "slow glass" sequences by writer Isabella and penciler Gene Colan, original material included part one of a two-issue adaptation of John Wyndham's novel The Day of the Triffids, by writer Gerry Conway and penciler Ross Andru; and an adaptation by Isabella and Colan of Shaw's original "slow glass" short story "Light of Other Days". Comics historian Richard J. Arndt believes the "Triffids" adaptation was originally scheduled for Worlds Unknown #7-8, the final issues, which had instead deviated from SF adaptations to adapt the contemporaneous film The Golden Voyage of Sinbad (1974). Arndt also notes, "The 'Savage World' story's art was done in 1954 for Buster Crabbe Comics but it was unused. In 1966 Wally Wood wrote a new script (the original had been lost) for the artwork...."

=== Subsequent issues ===
Subsequent issues featured the original stories "War Toy", by Isabella and penciler George Pérez (issue #2); "Gestation" (#3), "Kick the Can" (#4), and "Old Soldier" (#6), all by writer-artist Bruce Jones; "Encounter at War", by Jan Strnad and Richard Corben (#4); "Paradise Found", by writer Jones and artist Gray Morrow, and "Addict", by writer Don Glut and artist Virgilio Redondo (both #5); "Mind Games", by writer-artist John Allison, and "Visitation", by Glut and Ruben Yandoc (both #6). Thomas succeeded Isabella as framing-sequence writer with the last two issues. Additionally, the magazine reprinted a handful more stories from fanzine and alternative comics, such as Kaluta's "The Hunter and the Hunted" (#2), from Abyss #1 (Nov. 1970), and Allison's "Half Life" (#5), from the Canadian publication Orb #2 (1974).

Adaptations included Alfred Bester's "Adam and No Eve", by writer Denny O'Neil and penciler Jim Mooney (#2); Frank Herbert's "Occupation Force", by Conway and penciler Pérez; Larry Niven's "...Not Long Before the End", by writer Doug Moench and artist Vicente Alcazar; and Harlan Ellison's "'Repent, Harlequin!' Said the Ticktockman", by writer Roy Thomas and artist Alex Niño (all #3); A. E. van Vogt's "The Enchanted Village", by writers Don & Maggie Thompson and artist Dick Giordano, Otis Adelbert Kline's "A Vision of Venus", by writer-artist Tim Conrad, and Robert Silverberg's "Good News from the Vatican", by Conway and artist Adrian Gonzales under the pen name Ading Gonzales (all #4); Larry Niven's "All The Myriad Ways", by writer-artist Howard Chaykin (#5); and Michael Moorcock's novel Behold the Man, by Moench and Niño.

Interviews with Bester (issue #2), Herbert (#3), Niven (#5), and van Vogt (#4) appeared in issues containing their respective adaptations. Theodore Sturgeon was interviewed for the title's summer annual. A planned adaptation of Robert Bloch's "A Toy for Juliette", promised in the letters page of issue #3, did not materialize here, although it was eventually adapted by Rick Geary for an independent comic in the mid-1980s.

Cover artists included Brunner, Frank Kelly Freas, Michael Kaluta, Michael Whelan, and Sebastià Boada, pseudonymously under one of his middle names, Puigdomenech.

=== Annual publication ===
The Unknown Worlds of Science Fiction Giant Size Special Issue #1, cover-dated simply 1976, contained the original stories "Journey's End", by writer Bruce Jones and artist Alex Niño; "The Forest for the Trees", by Jones and artist Vicente Alcazar; "Preservation of the Species", by Jones and the mononym credit "Redondo" (either Virgilio Redondo or his brother and frequent Marvel contributor Nestor Redondo is uncertain); "Clete", by writer-artist Jones; "Sinner", by writer-artist Archie Goodwin, reprinted from witzend #1 (July 1966); and "Threads", by Mat Warrick and Gonzales. Glut and Yandoc adapted Stanley G. Weinbaum's "A Martian Odyssey". Don Newton painted the cover. The annual also featured an interview with Theodore Sturgeon, and a reprint, from Worlds Unknown #4, of Conway and John Buscema's adaptation of Fredric Brown's "Arena".

Historian Arndt believes "Threads", credited to writer Mat Warrick, "may actually be by Mal Warrick, a fanzine & science fiction writer of the time". A writer named Mat Warwick published comic-book science fiction in this mid-1970s timeframe in Star Reach. Additionally, "Threads" was reprinted in the Marvel UK title Star Wars Weekly #3 (Feb. 1978), credited under yet another variant of the name, Matt Warrick.

Editor Roy Thomas, in an editorial on page 4, dated September 1976, wrote that the series "didn't quite succeed in selling the magic number of copies needed to sustain it. No, it didn't lose money ... it didn't make quite enough profit to allow it to be continued. ... Still, in the meantime we had enough material on hand for two or three issues, counting a couple of finished scripts, as yet unillustrated, plus a couple of stories already totally completed. So, after many conferences ... I received the go-ahead to put out a giant one-shot special".

A column on page 95 of the special explains that the story "Man-Gods", planned for this issue and promoted on Marvel Bullpen Bulletins pages and elsewhere, had become lost by the U.S. Postal Service. The story, with art by Niño, is unrelated to "Man-God", an adaptation of Philip Wylie's Übermensch novel Gladiator, by Thomas and Tony DeZuniga, that appeared in the Marvel/Curtis magazine Marvel Preview #9 (Winter 1976). However, a 37-page story titled "Man-Gods from Beyond the Stars", by co-plotter Thomas, writer Doug Moench and artist Niño, had by this time seen print in Marvel Preview #1 (1975). The column stated that the replacement for "Man-Gods" was the four-page Goodwin story and the 15-page "Arena" reprint.
