= Isaac Asimov Presents The Great SF Stories 3 (1941) =

1980 collection of short stories edited by Isaac Asimov and Martin H. Greenberg

- First edition cover
- Editors: Isaac Asimov; Martin H. Greenberg
- Cover artist: Jack Gaughan
- Language: English
- Series: Isaac Asimov Presents The Great SF Stories
- Genre: Science fiction
- Publisher: DAW Books
- Publication date: March 1980
- Publication place: United States
- Media type: Print (hardback & paperback)
- Preceded by: Isaac Asimov Presents The Great SF Stories 2 (1940)
- Followed by: Isaac Asimov Presents The Great SF Stories 4 (1942)

Isaac Asimov Presents The Great SF Stories 3 (1941) is an English language collection of science fiction short stories, edited by Isaac Asimov and Martin H. Greenberg. The series attempts to list the great science fiction stories from the Golden Age of Science Fiction. They date the Golden Age as beginning in 1939 and lasting until 1963. The book was later reprinted as the first half of Isaac Asimov Presents The Golden Years of Science Fiction, Second Series with the second half being Isaac Asimov Presents The Great SF Stories 4 (1942).

This volume was originally published by DAW books in March 1980.

== Contents ==
- "Mechanical Mice" by Maurice A. Hugi
- "Shottle Bop" by Theodore Sturgeon
- "The Rocket of 1955" by C. M. Kornbluth
- "Evolution's End" by Robert Arthur
- "Microcosmic God" by Theodore Sturgeon
- "Jay Score" by Eric Frank Russell
- "Liar!" by Isaac Asimov
- "Time Wants a Skeleton" by Ross Rocklynne
- "The Words of Guru" by C. M. Kornbluth
- "The Seesaw" by A. E. van Vogt
- "Armageddon" by Fredric Brown
- "Adam and No Eve" by Alfred Bester
- "Solar Plexus" by James Blish
- "Nightfall" by Isaac Asimov
- "A Gnome There Was" by Henry Kuttner and C. L. Moore
- "Snulbug" by Anthony Boucher
- "Hereafter, Inc." by Lester del Rey

Five additional stories by Robert A. Heinlein were intended to be printed in this volume, however arrangements for their use could not be made. Martin Greenberg and Isaac Asimov's notes for each are included where the stories would have appeared.
