= Alfred Hitchcock Presents season 2 =

Alfred Hitchcock Presents aired 39 episodes during its second season from 1956 to 1957.
Alfred Hitchcock Presents was nominated for a Primetime Emmy Award for Best Series, Half Hour or Less at the 9th Primetime Emmy Awards on March 16, 1957.

No. overall	No. in season	Title	Directed by	Written by	Stars	Original release date
40	1	"Wet Saturday"	Alfred Hitchcock	Story by : John Collier; Teleplay by : Marian Cockrell	Sir Cedric Hardwicke as Mr. Princey, John Williams as Captain Smollet	September 30, 1956
After his severely disturbed daughter Millie (Purdom) kills a schoolmaster, Mr. Withers, who had been sheltering in the family barn from the heavy rain, with a croquet mallet, Mr. Princey (Hardwicke) devises a plan to save his family name. Working together with his wife (Givney), hopeless medical school dropout son George (Barclay), and Millie, Princey methodically sets up the man's body and crime scene so that family friend Captain Smollet (Williams) will take the blame for the murder, as Smollet admits to the family that he had been turned down for engagement by the deceased man's wife and had walked in on the family discussing the murder (believing it to be a joke). Mr. Princey wipes the mallet clean of fingerprints and has George stash the body before threatening Smollet at gunpoint with a shotgun, having George punch Smollet, making Smollet handle the murder weapon, and finally forcing Smollet to dump the body in the sewer. They go back to the house and fake the story of a rat to deceive the maid, Jane. Smollet then leaves, while Mr. Princey feeds a story to the family to be used for the involvement of the police, whom he then calls. Supporting Cast: Kathryn Givney as Mrs. Princey, Tita Purdom as Millicent "Millie" Princey, Jered Barclay (credited as Jerry Barclay) as George, Irene Lang as Jane
41	2	"Fog Closing In"	Herschel Daugherty	Story by : Martin Brooke; Teleplay by : James Cavanagh	Phyllis Thaxter as Mary Hadley Summers, Paul Langton as Arthur Summers	October 7, 1956
Thirty-five-year-old Mary Summers (Thaxter) begs her salesman husband Arthur (Langton) not to go away on a business trip, but he refuses, instead offering her a revolver for protection. Mary complains that the house is small and isolated from her parents, with whom she desires to live, and which Arthur refuses to accept. They argue while a cab driver (Nelson) impatiently waits to take Arthur to the airport. Mary is alone in the house when Ted Lambert (Grizzard), an escapee from a state mental institution, breaks in. The two quickly develop a rapport regarding both having extensive fear, and Mary confesses that she is always been afraid except for when she lived with her parents, only her husband no longer wants to live with them. She even confesses to wishing that she had never gotten married. While talking, two hospital interns (Willis) stop by to check on Ted's whereabouts, and they search the house, to no avail, as Ted leaves. Arthur returns home after hearing of the hospital escape, and Mary shoots him when he walks up the stairs as had repeatedly occurred in her dreams. Mary then tells her father (Frees) on the phone that she can return home now. Supporting Cast: George Grizzard as Ted Lambert, Billy Nelson as Cab Driver, Norman Willis as Hospital Intern, Paul Frees as Mary's Father (uncredited) Note: Carol Veazie is credited as Mrs. Connolly but does not appear in the episode; this suggests deleted scenes. On March 16, 1957 this episode won a 1956 Emmy Award for author James P. Cavanagh for Best Teleplay Writing at the 9th Primetime Emmy Awards.
42	3	"De Mortuis"	Robert Stevens	Story by : John Collier; Teleplay by : Francis Cockrell	Robert Emhardt as Professor Rankin, Cara Williams as Irene Rankin	October 14, 1956
Aware that their friend Professor "Prof" Rankin (Emhardt)'s wife Irene (Williams) is cheating on him, Wally (Jones) and Bud (Coolidge) draw the same conclusion when they find Irene missing and Rankin sealing up a hole in his basement. Bud flashes back to when he realized that Irene was unfaithful. He remembers seeing Irene openly flirt with a truck driver (Wynant) in Benny (McLean)'s diner. Wally remembers waking up in the middle of night hungry and Irene suddenly appearing in his kitchen wanting to share cigarettes with him. When they hear "Prof" working in the basement, they try to convince him to go fishing. Prof, however, is conducting an experiment with domesticating rats in the basement and wants to wait for Irene to return, as she is supposedly visiting an old family friend (which neither Wally nor Bud believes). "Prof" receives a call from Swanson (Frees) at the bank regarding Irene emptying their accounts, while Wally and Bud discuss what could have actually happened to her. Wally and Bud confront "Prof", asking which of Irene's lovers he caught her with; "Prof" is initially furious before accepting the reality of his circumstances. Wally and Bud agree to the story that they saw Irene hitch a ride and that they never went in the cellar. When Irene returns home later, "Prof" lures her to the basement and kills her for real. Supporting Cast: Henry Jones as Wally Long, Philip Coolidge as Bud, Bill McLean (credited as William McLean) as Benny, H.M. Wynant (credited as Haim Winant) as Truck Driver, Paul Frees as Swanson (uncredited)
43	4	"Kill with Kindness"	Herschel Daugherty	A. J. Russell	Hume Cronyn as Fitzhugh Oldham, Carmen Mathews as Katherine Oldham	October 21, 1956
Hoping to profit from life insurance fraud, siblings Katherine (Matthews) and Fitzhugh 'Fitz' Oldham (Cronyn) plan to torch their house and have a homeless man, Jorgy (Gleason), die in Fitzhugh's place. Forgetful pyromaniac Fitz is especially distraught at having to destroy his butterfly collection and kill all his birds, being an avid bird watcher. They invite Jorgy to eat a hearty meal of stew and dress Jorgy in a suit of Fitz's clothes before putting sleeping medicine in his glass of milk. The plan backfires when, once they have lit the fire, they are unable to put Fitz's identifying ring on Jorgy. The siblings have no choice but to save themselves and Jorgy, and they get to watch the house burn as firemen attempt to put it out and a neighbor (Liszt) serves them coffee while proclaiming Fitz a hero. Supporting Cast: James Gleason as Mr. Jorgy, Mike Ragan as Fireman, Margie Liszt as Neighbor
44	5	"None Are So Blind"	Robert Stevens	Story by : John Collier; Teleplay by : James Cavanagh	Hurd Hatfield as Seymour Johnston, Mildred Dunnock as Aunt Muriel Drummond	October 28, 1956
Egotistical, vain, money-hungry Seymour Johnston (Hatfield) shoots and kills his rich aunt, Muriel Drummond (Dunnock) as he is desperate to control his late father's fortune and she is utterly embarrassed by his antics. He believes himself to be a Renaissance man who operates an antique shop with his equally money-hungry girlfriend Liza (Stevens). He pins the blame on "Antonio Battani", a fake persona that he has created using make-up and a wig after finding a California driver license utilizing the name. He evens rents an apartment in New Jersey for months and engages with his neighbors brusquely to give the identity fullness. He sends threatening letters to Aunt Muriel demanding $10,000, though she easily sees through the scheme and doesn't even send the letters to the police, which he desired her to do. Liza laughs at his plan, which leaves to him to consider Liza's demise equally expedient. Seymour's plan fails because his willful blindness of his own faults means that he no longer "sees" his distinctive facial birthmark, which gives his disguise away to a neighbor (Bronson), and he is promptly arrested by a police detective (Lane) who had been a friend of his late aunt. Supporting Cast: K.T. Stevens as Liza, Rusty Lane as Police Detective, Lillian Bronson as Neighbor, Dorothy Crehan as Maid
45	6	"Toby"	Robert Stevens	Story by : Joseph Bates Smith; Teleplay by : Victor Wolfson	Jessica Tandy as Edwina Freel, Robert H. Harris as Albert Birch	November 4, 1956
New York City, 1910. Landlady Mrs. Foster (Wickes) and resident Marie McGurk (Corby) discuss the eccentric new neighbor when Albert Birch (Harris) arrives with roses. Birch is excited to be reunited with his sweetheart, Edwina (Tandy), after 20 years apart, and he speaks of his lifelong obsession to the two ladies. An Italian tenant (Santon) complains about the heat when Edwina arrives with a baby in a bundle, whom she claims is just getting over scarlet fever. Edwina claims that the parents died recently in a carriage accident and she is now responsible for Toby. Although the reunion is joyful, Edwina has mood swings and refuses to let anyone, including Mrs. Foster and Marie and Mac McGurk (Mathews), see her baby nephew, Toby, even threatening the McGurks with a knife. Edwina tearfully confesses her extreme sadness at failing to start a family with Albert after he left years before. Eventually it is revealed by asylum attendants Ben and Amos that Edwina has escaped from a mental asylum and, after Edwina tells Birch that he is now responsible for Toby, Birch discovers that Toby is a friendly black cat. Supporting Cast: Mary Wickes as Mrs. Foster (Landlady), Ellen Corby as Marie McGurk, George Mathews as Mac McGurk, Penny Santon as Italian Tenant, James Nolan as Ben (asylum employee)
46	7	"Alibi Me"	Jules Bricken	Story by : Therd Jefre and Walter Newman; Teleplay by : Bernard C. Schoenfeld	Lee Philips as Georgie Minnelli, Chick Chandler as Lucky Moore	November 11, 1956
Gangster Georgie Minnelli (Philips) argues with his known rival, Lucky Moore (Chandler), over the pinball racket and discuss the promotion of their cop enemy, Lieutenant James Larkin (Stephens). Georgie kills Lucky after Lucky jokes about sending Georgie the biggest lollypop in town and then works to set up an adequate alibi. He tries to use his willing bartender Uncle Leo (Reed), but Leo refuses to lie to Larkin. He then tries to reconnect with his former girlfriend Goldie (Smith), but she wants nothing to do with him after finding a signed photo of another girlfriend, Viola (Paul). Next, he goes to the hospital to set up the alibi with elderly friend Timmy (Tyler), but the ever supportive and willing Timmy dies just a few minutes into Georgie's visit. Upon going home, he finally sets up an alibi that he was in his apartment the whole day by threatening landlady Mrs. Salvatore (Brunetti) about her fifteen-year-old daughter Maria. When Larkin stops by and questions Georgie, a delivery boy (Erickson) arrives with a package and receives no tip afterwards, so he complains, revealing that he had tried to deliver the package five times previously that day because Georgie was not at home. Supporting Cast: Harvey Stephens as Lieutenant James Larkin, Alan Reed as Uncle Leo, Eugenia Paul as Viola, Argentina Brunetti as Mrs. Salvatore, Charlie Cantor as Barney, Shirley Smith as Goldie, Harry Tyler as Timmy, Herb Vigran as Newsman, Lee Erickson as Messenger Boy Note: Charlie Cantor and Herb Vigran are credited but do not appear in the episode; this suggests deleted scenes. Eugenia Paul is credited but only appears in a photograph, suggesting possible deleted scenes.
47	8	"Conversation Over a Corpse"	Jules Bricken	Story by : Norman Daniels; Teleplay by : Marian Cockrell and Norman Daniels	Dorothy Stickney as Cissie Enright, Carmen Mathews as Joanna Enright, Ray Collins as Herbert Brenner	November 18, 1956
Real estate salesman Herbert Brenner (Collins) threatens to take sisters Cissie Enright (Stickney) and Joanna Enright (Matthews) to court unless they sell him their home. Herbert brags to his local bank teller (Stanhope) about the power he holds over them and the house, as Herbert wants to tear down the house for the value of the land upon which it sits. Cissie claims to Brenner that Joanna isn't really her sister but a nurse named Abigail who came thirty years earlier when Cissie's mother was dying. Cissie's real sister was sickly and died and Abigail replaced her. The domineering Joanna had ordered Cissie to poison Brenner through tea but she only gave him half the dosage which is why he is still alive. Brenner manages to shoot Joanna dead before Joanna can kill him with an axe. When he refuses to relent on letting her remain in the house, the manipulative Cissie poisons his glass of whiskey. Cissie is left alone with the house that she so dearly loves with two dead bodies. Supporting Cast: Ted Stanhope as Bank Teller
48	9	"Crack of Doom"	James Neilson	Story by : Don Marquis; Teleplay by : Robert C. Dennis	Robert Horton as Mason Bridges, Robert Middleton as Sam Klinker	November 25, 1956
While traveling on a train, company man Mason Bridges (Horton) turns down an opportunity to play poker with friends Tom Ackley (Lummis), Whitman (Britton), and the porter (Watkin), among others. When asked by Tom why he turned it down, he explains by flashing back to a past controversial case of excess. After dealing with the secretary, Della (Stewart), regarding normal business, he gets invited to a high-stakes poker game and is determined to beat his rich client, Sam Klinker (Middleton). Klinker proves to be the only legitimate threat to winning, as the others (Gordon, DeSales, Kirkpatrick, Reynolds) fall easily by comparison. Klinker takes $1000 from Mason, who leaves desperate to win it back, so Mason takes $4000 of Klinker's money that was for legitimate office business. His rationale is that he has $9000 in the bank and can pay it back the next day. When Mason discovers that his wife Jessie (Kobe) has lost all their savings through a bad tip about oil in the stock market, he steals the rest of Klinker's money ($6000) from the office to keep playing. During a crucial hand, Mason thinks he has four queens and bets everything aggressively (even writing a worthless check for $5000), to Klinker's surprise. At the last moment Mason realizes that he had read his last card wrong, but Klinker folds and Mason wins the pot on his bluff. Supporting Cast: Gail Kobe as Jessie Bridges, Dayton Lummis as Tom Ackley, Kay Stewart as Della the Secretary, Keith Britton as Whitman, Pierre Watkin as Porter, Gavin Gordon as Card Player, Francis DeSales as Card Player, Jess Kirkpatrick as Card Player, Alan Reynolds as Card Player
49	10	"Jonathan"	John Meredyth Lucas	Story by : Fred Levan; Teleplay by : Bernard C. Schoenfeld and Stirling Silliphant	Georgann Johnson as Rosine Dalliford, Corey Allen as Gil Dalliford	December 2, 1956
Gil Dalliford (Allen), who had an extremely close relationship with his late father, Jonathan (Kennedy), narrates their closeness while revisiting his former home. He flashes back to his father informing him of beginning a relationship with his secretary, later stepmother, Rosine (Johnson), whom Gil has always despised. He accuses Rosine of killing his father while he was traveling in Mexico City, as he does not believe the report of Dr. Mack (Kingsford). Gil visited Mexico City on the advice of, and with, his friend Don (Wilder). It was then that he gave a giant bottle of poisoned brandy to Rosine in order to kill her. Gil's investigation uncovers the bottle in question, and Rosine admits that she had guessed that it was poisoned and so gave it to Jonathan instead, thusly killing him. She confesses that breaking Jonathan and Gil apart had broken her marriage to Jonathan apart as well, and she was desperate not to be left with nothing. Supporting Cast: Douglas Kennedy as Jonathan Dalliford, John Wilder as Don Note: Nancy Kulp (as Nurse), Walter Kingsford (as Dr. Mack), Hope Landin (as Mrs. Duffin), and Heidi Mullenger are credited but do not appear in the episode; this suggests deleted scenes for the episode.
50	11	"The Better Bargain"	Herschel Daugherty	Story by : Richard Deming; Teleplay by : Bernard C. Schoenfeld	Robert Middleton as Louis Koster, Henry Silva as Harry Silver	December 9, 1956
Private investigator Cutter (Hanmer) visits mobster Louis 'King' Koster (Middleton) and his miniature shipbuilding assistant Baldy (Lambert). Koster learns from Cutter that his wife, bird fanatic and former showbiz performer Marian (Hughes), is cheating on him with a professor-like man of thirty years or so in age. Marian claims to be meeting a friend in Cleveland whose husband died, so Koster, who has worked to go legitimate, sends Cutter to Cleveland and hires hit man Harry Silver (Silva) to confirm the information about Marian and her potential lover. Silver is surprisingly reluctant, but Koster just keeps offering him more money. Cutter returns to reveal that Marian did not go to Cleveland but met her poetic lover, who does not know her actual identity. Cutter believes the man to be a potential professor of English literature. Koster ultimately hires Silver to kill her and the lover for $20,000. However, after Marian surprises Koster and Silver meeting, Koster changes his mind about killing Marian, whom he loves immensely. Koster offers to pay $10,000 to kill the lover alone, but Silver changes his mind. Silver tells Koster that he doesn't know how to properly appreciate a woman like Marian, and only a good woman and a poem are to live and die for, thus making it clear he is the man with whom Marian is having an affair which explains his previous reluctance to get involved. Having already dispatched Baldy outside the office offscreen, Silver is moving in for the kill as the episode ends. Supporting Cast: Kathleen Hughes as Marian Koster, Don Hanmer as Cutter, Jack Lambert as Baldy
51	12	"The Rose Garden"	Francis Cockrell	Story by : Vincent Fotre; Teleplay by : Marian Cockrell	John Williams as Alexander Vinton, Patricia Collinge as Julia Pickering	December 16, 1956
Louisiana. Publisher Alexander Vinton (Williams) takes a cab from gossip cab driver Barney (Peters) about sisters Julia Pickering (Collinge) and Cordelia Welles (Varden) and their background regarding romantic suitors. Vinton suspects that the novel Julia has written is based on a true story of how her domineering sister Cordelia had killed her husband, and Vinton stays in the room described as the murder scene. Julia had to write the book behind Cordelia's back, as Cordelia does not approve. Vinton evens digs in Cordelia's rose garden looking for the body. Vinton encourages Julia to stand up to her dominating sister, eventually drawing out a confession of the murder, which Vinton overhears. Cordelia murdered her husband and buried him in the other garden growing prize-winning roses. Supporting Cast: Evelyn Varden as Cordelia Welles, Ralph Peters as Barney the Cab Driver
52	13	"Mr. Blanchard's Secret"	Alfred Hitchcock	Story by : Emily Neff; Teleplay by : Sarett Rudley	Mary Scott as Babs Fenton, Robert Horton as John Fenton, Meg Mundy as Ellen Blanchard	December 23, 1956
Kooky mystery writer Babs Fenton (Scott) has an overactive imagination and suspects the worst when she fails to meet new neighbor Mrs. Blanchard after a couple of weeks, so she breaks into the Blanchard home late at night after the maid (Hardt) leaves and is caught by Charles Blanchard (Lummis), the husband. While imagining what gruesome outcome could have befallen Mrs. Blanchard, she is suddenly visited by the woman in question, Ellen (Mundy), who is perfectly pleasant. She continues to be suspicious when Charles acts strangely around Ellen, who assures Babs that Charles just hates being home without her. Babs even types about scenarios involving Charles killing Ellen. However, every time that Babs thinks that she has figured out the truth, she is proven wrong, and Ellen is always fine. Supporting Cast: Dayton Lummis as Charles Blanchard, Eloise Hardt as Maid
53	14	"John Brown's Body"	Robert Stevens	Story by : Thomas Burke; Teleplay by : Robert C. Dennis	Hugh Marlowe as Harold Skinner, Russell Collins as John Brown, Leora Dana as Vera Brown	December 30, 1956
Harold Skinner (Marlowe) and John Brown (Collins) discuss the merits of modern chair designs versus classical designs, with John favoring classical designs and Harold favoring modern. Harold, who is having an affair with John's wife Vera (Dana), seeks to oust John from his company by getting him declared mentally unfit and sent to a home, with Vera in favor of the plan as well. After being served by the waiter (Rousseau) on their date, Harold plans to undermine John's authority by portraying him as forgetful and untrustworthy, making scenes in front of servant Ellen (Hayworth) and sabotaging paperwork at the office. At home, Ellen stages a forgetful moment in front of his doctor, Sam Helck (Kingsford). Dr. Helck sets up an appointment with specialist Dr. Croatman (Ryan), whom John greatly distrusts. John flees in front of the receptionist (Baker), to the delight of Harold, and the doctor recommends John be sent to a home. Harold's fails to impress various clients, while John thrives in becoming a painter. When the company tanks due to the failure of the modern chair designs, the company accountant (Leavitt) says only a loan could save it, as Harold needs to raise $50,000. After ten months, Vera and Harold desperately need John's help but are unable to get him discharged by his doctor, as John signs his discharge papers with the name "George Washington". Supporting Cast: Edmon Ryan as Dr. Croatman, Walter Kingsford as Dr. Sam Helck, Jean Hayworth as Ellen (credited as Jean Owens), Norman Leavitt as Accountant, Madelon Baker as Doctor's Receptionist, Marcel Rousseau as Waiter
54	15	"Crackpot"	John Meredyth Lucas	Story by : Harold Gast; Teleplay by : Martin Berkeley	Biff McGuire as Ray Loomis, Robert Emhardt as Mr. Moon, Mary Scott as Meg Loomis	January 6, 1957
Newlyweds Ray (McGuire) and Meg Loomis' (Scott) honeymoon is slightly marred by the recent death of his aunt and a flat tire preventing them from reaching their destination. After discovering that their spare tire is flat as well, a man named Mr. Moon (Emhardt) arrives and fixes their tire enough to get them driving again. When Ray trips and gets Moon's suit filthy, Moon remarks that he could kill Ray for that and drives away. At their hotel, they find difficulty in finding a room due to a convention. The bellhop (Garris) informs them that Sergeant Carpenter (Fox) is waiting for them, and the sergeant has questions for them about his aunt's stolen jewelry. Meg, who grew up poor, wants to return to Ray's family mansion, while Ray just wants to get away. The clerk (Guth) finally finds them a room, which is right next to that of Moon. They are passively harassed by Moon, whom Ray believes is actually trying to kill them. Although Moon makes substantial noise banging on the wall, Moon calls the hotel clerk complaining about Ray pounding on the wall, with Moon stating that he is trying to take a nap. When Ray barges into Moon's room, Moon pulls a pistol. Ray tries to get another room, but the clerk claims there are none, due to the convention. Moon suddenly appears with his pistol, Ray accuses him of murdering his aunt, with Ray then knocking Moon down and the couple fleeing. Ray orders Meg to leave when he hears what sounds like a time bomb, but he rushes back for his bag that contains the jewels stolen from his aunt. Moon, however, is a Pasadena police officer and set up the ruse to trap Ray. Supporting Cast: Michael Fox as Sergeant Carpenter, Raymond Guth as Room Clerk, Phil Garris as Bellhop
55	16	"Nightmare in 4-D"	Justus Addiss	Story by : Stuart Jerome; Teleplay by : Robert C. Dennis	Henry Jones as Harry Parker, Barbara Baxley as Miss Elliot, Virginia Gregg as Norma Parker	January 13, 1957
Harry Parker (Jones) helps his pretty neighbor, Miss Elliot (Baxley), carry her groceries home from the store. Afterward, he gleefully holds a conversation with the building superintendent, Charlie (Helton), before going home to his wife Norma (Gregg). Harry's active dream life makes him stay up to watch television, but Miss Elliot knocks on his door, desperate for help. They go to her apartment where she shows him the body of her piano-playing boyfriend, Bill Nielsen, whom she claims was shot from outside the window. Harry agrees to help hide the body and stage the scene as if it were a robbery. After dreaming of the night's activities, he confesses to Norma the next morning, but she says that he was merely dreaming. When Harry goes down to the basement to check, he meets Police Lieutenant Orsatti (Lloyd), who is conducting the investigation. Orsatti and a police sergeant (Bartold) uncover that Norma was having an affair with the dead man, but they believe that Harry killed him over envy of Miss Elliot, as Norma has an alibi with busybody neighbor Mrs. Bouton (Urecal), with whom she was speaking over the phone about the high volume of the television. Supporting Cast: Percy Helton as Charlie the Building Super, Norman Lloyd as Lieutenant Orsatti, Minerva Urecal as Mrs. Bouton (the Busybody), Norman Bartold as Police Sergeant,
56	17	"My Brother, Richard"	Herschel Daugherty	Story by : Jay Bennett; Teleplay by : Sarett Rudley	Royal Dano as Martin Ross, Inger Stevens as Laura Ross, Harry Townes as Richard Ross	January 20, 1957
District Attorney Martin Ross (Dano) faces a crisis in his campaign for governor when his brother Richard (Townes), a construction company owner, shoots and kills the competition, three-term legislator Burton Reeves, with the death being confirmed by Sheriff Briggs (Teal). When Martin talks about resigning and turning in his brother, Richard threatens to kill Martin's wife, Laura (Stevens), with the same gun used to kill Reeves. Martin makes a deal with eighteen-year-old Tommy Kopeck (Ellis), his oft-used caddy, to temporarily confess to the murder in order to save Laura's life, as Sheriff Briggs has already arrested Tommy for the murder. After Martin returns home, he attacks Richard to seize the gun but is knocked out. Tommy's mother (Golm), mistaking Richard for Martin, begs him to release Tommy, and when Richard refuses, she stabs him to death. Martin then recovers and reassures Tommy's mother that her son will be alright. Supporting Cast: Ray Teal as Sheriff Briggs, Robert Ellis as Tommy Kopeck, Lisa Golm as Mrs. Kopeck
57	18	"The Manacled"	Robert Stevens	Story by : A. Sanford Wolfe; Teleplay by : Stirling Silliphant	Gary Merrill as Sergeant Rockwell, William Redfield as Stephen Fontaine	January 27, 1957
White-collar criminal Stephen Fontaine (Redfield) and Police Sergeant Rockwell eat in a cafe while talking with a friendly waitress (Harford) about Fontaine's crime. Fontaine is being transported to prison via train and the two must rush when the station announcer (Frees) declares that the train is soon departing. Fontaine plays a game of fingerbang with a young boy, Billy (Hunley), which alarms his mother (Stewart). Fontaine then teases the train conductor (Lane), who inquires about Fontaine's upcoming criminal penalty while helping Rockwell learn the present security features. Fontaine, facing ten years in prison for larceny, then tries to bribe Rockwell, a father of four, for his freedom with $50,000, which was brought on board by Fontaine's mother (Evanson), and who snuck an envelope with the offer in Rockwell's pocket when he helped her with her luggage. Fontaine even convinces Rockwell to personally check to ensure that the money is indeed present, which it is. When the conductor announces that they have reached their final stop of Richmond and Rockwell still has not accepted, Fontaine grabs for Rockwell's gun and kills him. Fontaine then discovers that the bullet damaged the key in Rockwell's pocket, and he cannot unlock the manacles. Supporting Cast: Gary Hunley as Billy, Rusty Lane as Train Conductor, Edith Evanson as Lady with Suitcase / Fontaine's Mother, Betty Harford as Waitress, Kay Stewart as Billy's Mother, Paul Frees as Train Station Announcer (uncredited)
58	19	"A Bottle of Wine"	Herschel Daugherty	Story by : Borden Deal; Teleplay by : Stirling Silliphant	Herbert Marshall as Judge Connors, Robert Horton as Wallace Donaldson, Jarma Lewis as Grace Connors	February 3, 1957
Wealthy, elderly (64 years old) Judge Connors' former secretary and much younger wife, Grace (Lewis), is leaving him for a younger man, Chicago architect Wallace Donaldson (Horton). Connors (Marshall) invites Wallace to his Wisconsin home, quotes Aristotle and Socrates, pretends to poison the two of them with an old sherry that Connors bought on their honeymoon and saved for their tenth anniversary (and which Connors initially forces Wallace to drink at gunpoint), and locks Wallace in the library in an attempt to show Grace what kind of man Wallace is. Wallace shoots through the door to get out and accidentally kills Connors. He then learns that the Judge and his wife never went on a honeymoon to Spain.
59	20	"Malice Domestic"	John Meredyth Lucas	Story by : Philip MacDonald; Teleplay by : Victor Wolfson	Ralph Meeker as Carl Borden, Phyllis Thaxter as Annette Borden	February 10, 1957
Carl (Meeker) and Annette Borden (Thaxter) say their goodbyes to friends Perry Harrison (Clanton), a banker, and Lorna Jenkins (Kardell), a businesswoman, who are leaving their dog, a Great Dane named Cassandra, with the Bordens. Cassandra becomes especially fond of Carl but is reluctant to engage with Annette. Carl and Annette have grown increasingly apart ever since a business trip, with each suspicious of the other. Harrison comes over one night for dinner, and Carl collapses in pain shortly afterward, calling Dr. Ralph Wingate (Hayworth) just before he passes out. The doctor initially believes that the meal was simply too rich for Carl's stomach. After Carl gets severe indigestion again due to Annette's cooking, Wingate has Carl's blood tested and finds a large dose of arsenic in it. Carl is angered at Ralph for insinuating that Annette tried to poison him, but Annette later dies from arsenic-laced coffee just as they are set to vacation at Lake Tahoe. Wingate and Perry deduce that Annette gave Carl the wrong cup of coffee and help keep the circumstances of her death quiet. The entire scheme was actually a ruse by Carl to kill Annette so he could be with his lover. Supporting Cast: Ralph Clanton as Perry Harrison, Vinton Hayworth as Dr. Ralph Wingate, Lili Kardell as Lorna Jenkins
60	21	"Number Twenty-Two"	Robert Stevens	Story by : Evan Hunter; Teleplay by : Joel Murcott	Russell Collins as the Skinner #21, Rip Torn as Steve Morgan #22	February 17, 1957
Steve Morgan (Torn), a twenty-year-old ruffian, is picked up by Police Officers Rand and Franklin (Watts) and Detective Kelly (Nolan) for his first criminal offense after a failed stick-up at a candy store (he got only $12) with a fake .38 caliber revolver. After being booked by the booking officer (Sanders), he is led to a cell occupied by 49-year-old career jailbird Skinner (Collins), who explains the process to Morgan. The jailer, Madden (Ross), teases Morgan about his youth when he requests a shave before the custodial officer, Charlie (Leeds), leads the prisoners to the interrogation gallery. Morgan goes through the interrogation process along with Skinner, Assissi (Picerni), Tyrone (Wilson), and other prisoners, particularly enjoying the questioning of Assissi. At first, he is cocky about being arrested, as he wants to impress the other prisoners and assembled reporters (Wilkins, DeNormand), but he slowly cracks under the interrogation by the chief of detectives (Teal) and learns that the man he robbed has died of a skull fracture. Supporting Cast: Ray Teal as Chief of Detectives, James Nolan as Detective Kelly, Paul Picerni as Assissi, Mike Ross as Officer Madden (the jailer), Charles Watts as Police Officer Franklin, Robert C. Ross (credited as Bob Ross) as Police Officer Dolan, Hugh Sanders as Booking Officer, Peter Leeds as Custodial Officer Charlie, Martin Wilkins as Reporter, Harry Wilson as Prisoner Tyrone (uncredited), George DeNormand as Reporter (uncredited) Note: The actor who played the police officer named Rand (last name) is uncredited and currently unknown.
61	22	"The End of Indian Summer"	Robert Stevens	Story by : Maurice Baudin Jr. Teleplay by : James Cavanagh	Steve Forrest as Joe Rogers, Gladys Cooper as Mrs. Margarite Gillespie	February 24, 1957
Insurance investigator Joe Rogers (Forrest) is ordered by his boss, Sam Henderson (Coolidge), to re-examine multiple old $50,000 claims made by Mrs. Margarite Gillespie (Cooper), whose previous two husbands died under mysterious circumstances, and who is now engaged to a third. Joe is ordered to take his wife (Maguire) with him to aid him being undercover. Upon arriving at the hotel, his wife notices that they are being watched by another investigator, Saunders (Wever), after overhearing the man speak with the desk clerk (Curry). The Rogers go to speak with real estate man Graham (Dawson) about the Gillespie house. After going to the Gillespie home and speaking with both Mrs. Gillespie and her new fiancé Howard Fieldstone (Gleason), Joe receives a telegram from the bellhop (Kuhn) detailing Gillespie's new insurance policy on Fieldstone. The Rogers have a meal with Fieldstone, who wants to sell the Gillespie house and who admits that both he and Gillespie have new insurance policies. Joe receives a telephone call from Graham that Gillespie quickly sold the home, so he quickly drives over to the home, with only the maid (Summers) and Graham present. Just after Gillespie and Fieldstone leave for their wedding, Joe discovers that Fieldstone is also being investigated by Saunders and another insurance company, as he had made claims following the deaths of his four previous wives, all drowned in the bathtub after the honeymoon. Supporting Cast: Kathleen Maguire as Mrs. Rogers, James Gleason as Howard Fieldstone, Philip Coolidge as Sam Henderson, Hal K. Dawson as Graham, Ned Wever as Saunders, Hope Summers as Mrs. Gillespie's Housekeeper/Maid, Mickey Kuhn as Bellhop, Mason Curry as Desk Clerk
62	23	"One for the Road"	Robert Stevens	Story by : Emily Neff; Teleplay by : Robert C. Dennis	John Baragrey as Charles Hendricks, Georgann Johnson as Beryl Abbott, Louise Platt as Marsha Hendricks	March 3, 1957
Marsha Hendricks (Platt) learns that her husband Charles (Baragrey) is cheating on her while traveling on business trips when she finds a lighter with the other woman's initials, BA, in Charles' grey suit and calls a supposed business number, only to reach the home of the other woman, Beryl Abbott (Johnson). The other woman, Beryl, wants Charles to leave Marsha, which he refuses to do. When Marsha confronts Charles, he dismisses her feelings and says that it his right to see another woman if he wants, but he promises to end the extramarital relationship. Marsha tracks down the home of the other woman in the city of Lockton and pretends to be collecting old clothes for a welfare association. While at Beryl's apartment, Marsha puts poison in her sugar and spies a framed picture of Charles. Back at home, Marsha receives a call from Charles' secretary that he has gone to Lockton, so she frantically drives back there. When Marsha arrives at Beryl's, she confesses to Beryl about the poison, but Beryl falsely states that Charles left after drinking poisoned coffee. After Marsha leaves, Charles suddenly emerges from the bedroom, where he was hiding. Beryl gives Charles one final cup of coffee, with the poisoned sugar, when he still refuses to divorce Marsha for her. Note: Mickey Kuhn (credited as Michael Kuhn) is credited as Ellerbee but does not appear; this suggests deleted scenes.
63	24	"The Cream of the Jest"	Herschel Daugherty	Story by : Fredric Brown; Teleplay by : Sarett Rudley	Claude Rains as Charles Gresham, James Gregory as Wayne Campbell	March 10, 1957
Alcoholic has-been actor Charles Gresham (Rains) visits his favorite bar, where bartender Jerry (Silver) can't serve him a drink due to his sizeable bar tab. Gresham tries to blackmail producer Wayne Campbell (Gregory) into casting him in a new play but must wait with secretary Lee (Banks) for Campbell to conclude business. Gresham begs him for work, as he drinks when he has no role to play, and he cannot find his identity other than his roles. As he has been threatened with extortion for embezzlement in Philadelphia, Campbell gives Gresham the script for a high-paying role as a blackmailing gangster and advises him to perform it for one of the play's financial backers, Nick Roper (Picerni), in order to prove that he can play a "heavy". Gresham goes to Roper and performs the monologue, but it turns out to contain details of one of Roper's real crimes, and Roper shoots Gresham. As two of Roper's henchmen (Garrett and Martin) take away Gresham's body, Roper learns that Gresham learned about the crime from Wayne Campbell by a sheet of paper with the monologue typed on it and the letterhead of Campbell, and it is implied that Roper later killed Campbell. Supporting Cast: Paul Picerni as Nick Roper, Johnny Silver as Jerry the Bartender, Joan Banks as Lee, Don Garrett as Pete, Carol Shannon as Mrs. Campbell, Thomas Martin as Hoodlum, Lillian O'Malley as Library Patron (uncredited) Note: Carol Shannon is credited as Mrs. Campbell but does not appear in the episode; this suggests deleted scenes.
64	25	"I Killed the Count Part I"	Robert Stevens	Story by : Alec Coppel; Teleplay by : Francis Cockrell	John Williams as Inspector Davidson	March 17, 1957
Inspector Davidson (Williams) and his assistant Detective Raines (Davis) investigate the murder of Count Victor Mattoni (Dawson) in his London flat after he is found dead by assistant Polly Stephens (Hitchcock). Davidson speaks with fellow officer Clifton (Gould-Porter) and requests all relevant records from landlord Mr. Martin (Huxham) before questioning Stephens, who is quite acclimated to police questioning. Martin suggests speaking with "nightliftmen" Johnson (Pelling) and Mullet (Cooper), as Johnson was working the previous night's shift. They find a great deal of evidence in the flat, and the investigation uncovers Mattoni's links to Lord Sorrington (Napier) and a written letter by Mattoni directly claiming the guilt of American businessman Bernard K. Froy (Cooper). Davidson speaks with fingerprints officer Peters (Barclay) before summoning Mullet, whom he believes that he knows but cannot identify precisely how. Upon questioning, both Froy (due to the letter) and Sorrington (due to Mullet's identification of him as Mattoni's secret neighbor) separately confess to the murder, confusing Davidson. Supporting Cast: Anthony Dawson as Count Victor Mattoni, Charles Davis as Detective Raines, Alan Napier as Lord Sorrington, Pat Hitchcock as Polly Stephens, Charles Cooper as Bernard K. Froy, Melville Cooper as Mullet, Arthur Gould-Porter (credited as A.E. Gould-Porter) as Clifton, Kendrick Huxham as Mr. Martin, Jered Barclay (credited as Jerry Barclay) as Peters, George Pelling as Johnson
65	26	"I Killed the Count Part II"	Robert Stevens	Story by : Alec Coppel; Teleplay by : Francis Cockrell	John Williams as Inspector Davidson	March 24, 1957
Continuing from the previous episode, Inspector Davidson (Williams) is alarmed when the flat's elevator operator, Mullet (Cooper), becomes the third person to confess to the murder of Count Mattoni (Dawson). All three men (Froy, Sorrington, Mullet) are linked to the crime scene by physical evidence, have seemingly sound reasons for killing Mattoni, and are able to describe the murder convincingly, yet all three have evidence that somewhat contradicts their potential guilt. Sorrington admits that his daughter married Mattoni in Italy and that the Count abused her terribly, refusing even to give her a divorce when she left him, which is why he rented the adjacent apartment and killed him; it was Sorrington's gun that was found in the Mattoni apartment. Froy claims to be in love with Mattoni's wife and hated him for threatening to take full custody of their child, as well as his abusive behavior; it was Froy's threatening letter that was found in Mattoni's desk. Davidson interviews neighbor Louise Rogers (Harris) and dancer neighbor Miss LaLune (Arlen) to determine if they heard anything that night. LaLune reveals that Johnson (Barclay) wasn't working the lifts that night, and Johnson confesses to switching with Mullet. Davidson questions Mullet again, realizing only after a phone call that Mullet is actually career criminal Pat Lummock, as it was his fingerprints found on the scene. Mullet/Lummock then confesses to the murder, angering Davidson that there is yet another contender. Supporting Cast: Anthony Dawson as Count Victor Mattoni, Charles Davis as Detective Raines, Melville Cooper as Mullet / Pat Lummock, Alan Napier as Lord Sorrington, Charles Cooper as Bernard K. Froy, Rosemary Harris as Louise Rogers, Arthur Gould-Porter (credited as A.E. Gould-Porter) as Clifton, Roxanne Arlen as Miss LaLune, Jered Barclay (credited as Jerry Barclay) as Peters, George Pelling as Johnson
66	27	"I Killed the Count Part III"	Robert Stevens	Story by : Alec Coppel; Teleplay by : Francis Cockrell	John Williams as Inspector Davidson, Rosemary Harris as Louise Rogers / Helen Sorrington-Mattoni	March 31, 1957
Concluding the three-episode story, Inspector Davidson (Williams) interviews Mullet/Lummock, who says that he was borrowing money for gambling debts from Count Mattoni (Dawson) without his knowledge or consent and was caught in the act, leading to a struggle in which Mattoni was killed. Detective Raines (Davis) tries to lighten the mood for Davidson, but it only aggravates him further. When the trio are escorted to the police station by a policewoman (Marlowe), Davidson arranges so that Sorrington (Napier), Froy (Cooper), and Mullet/Lummock (Cooper) meet each other, and the three quietly about who actually committed the murder. Sorrington, Froy, and Mullet are secretly friends and conspired to kill Mattoni together and set up the evidence accordingly. They are eventually joined by Louise Rogers (Harris), who is actually Count Mattoni's widow and Sorrington's daughter Helen Sorrington-Mattoni, and who also confesses to the murder, with scratches on her that match Mattoni's fingernails. Upon discussion by the four detained, it is revealed that Helen killed Mattoni before the others got the chance, although Davidson is adamant that Helen is the only truly innocent one. Davidson and Raines realize that they will never be able to pinpoint the actual murderer out of the conspirators, so all four will likely end up getting away with it. Supporting Cast: Anthony Dawson as Count Victor Mattoni, Melville Cooper as Mullet / Pat Lummock, Charles Cooper as Bernard K. Froy, Alan Napier as Lord Sorrington, Arthur Gould-Porter (credited as A.E. Gould-Porter) as Clifton, Charles Davis as Detective Raines, Nora Marlowe as Policewoman, Peter Gordon as Harris
67	28	"One More Mile to Go"	Alfred Hitchcock	Story by : F. J. Smith; Teleplay by : James Cavanagh	David Wayne as Sam Jacoby	April 7, 1957
After murdering his spouse (Larabee), Sam Jacoby (Wayne) has trouble disposing of the body. He wraps up the body and places it in his car's trunk and drives to dispose of it in a nearby lake. However, he is stopped by a motorcycle cop (Brodie) because of a faulty taillight, and the cop helpfully points Jacoby to a local gas station, where the attendant Ed (Leavitt) replaces the bulb, but it doesn't work initially. The bulb finally works just as the cop is about to pry open the trunk with a crowbar, and Jacoby heads onward. The cop pulls Jacoby over once more to return the change (money) Jacoby forgot while at the gas station. Upon seeing that the light is out again, the cop detours Jacoby to the nearby police headquarters so their mechanic can open the trunk and fix it. Supporting Cast: Norman Leavitt as Ed the Gas Station Attendant, Steve Brodie as Motorcycle Cop, Louise Larabee as Mrs. Jacoby
68	29	"Vicious Circle"	Paul Henreid	Story by : Evan Hunter; Teleplay by : Bernard C. Schoenfeld	Dick York as Manny Coe, Kathleen Maguire as Betty	April 14, 1957
Young gangster Manny Coe (York) kills a man, Gallegher (Lambert), by order of his boss, Vince Williams (Macready), after Gallegher receives a phone call from girlfriend Dora (Morgan). Gallegher had messed up a robbery and was killed as a result. Manny briefly talks with another thug, Turk (Johnson), who doesn't like being displaced as Williams' premier henchman. Williams promises to take Manny as his protege if Manny kills girlfriend Betty (Maguire), who despises the work Manny does and wants him to quit. She has also been speaking negatively about Williams' activities around town and eventually goes to the police, which crosses the line for Williams. Manny is unable to do it, but Betty dies in an accident and Manny claims it as a hit. Sometime later, Manny has become rich and successful, with a new girlfriend named Ann Nash (Hughes). However, he botches a robbery and is killed by Williams' next young protege, Georgie (Brenlin). Supporting Cast: George Macready as Vincent Williams, Paul Lambert as Gallegher, Russell Johnson as Turk, Kathleen Hughes as Ann Nash, George Brenlin as Georgie, Tracey Morgan as Dora, Mickey Kuhn, Betty Woods as Accident Witness, Roy Darmour as Accident Witness
69	30	"The Three Dreams of Mr. Findlater"	Jules Bricken	Story by : A. A. Milne; Teleplay by : Sarett Rudley	John Williams as Ernest Findlater, Barbara Baxley as Lalage	April 21, 1957
Ernest Findlater (Williams), who has suffered years of verbal abuse by his wife Minnie (Elsom), fantasizes about her death. He invents Lalage (Baxley), an imaginary exotic lover from the South Seas taken from a caricature on a vacation advertisement. He tells her of another fantasy he frequently has in which he arrives home to find his maid Bridget (Glessing) in tears and Dr. Manley (Kingsford) informing him of Minnie's death from natural causes. At his club, after speaking with attendant Rogers (Gould-Porter), Lalage appears and encourages him to murder his wife. Ernest spends weeks working out every detail to ensure success including practice climbing a rope for to ensure he can enter through an upper window and manipulating Minnie into leaving everything to other people in her will so that there would be no motive. When Ernest finally returns home to commit the deed while dressed in a disguise, he finds that Minnie has died of natural causes via a stroke. The doctor sees through Findlater's foolish disguise. Supporting Cast: Raymond Bailey as Psychiatrist in introduction and conclusion (uncredited), Isobel Elsom as Minnie Findlater, Walter Kingsford as Dr. Manley, Arthur Gould-Porter (credited as A.E. Gould-Porter) as Rogers, Mollie Glessing as Bridget
70	31	"The Night the World Ended"	Justus Addiss	Story by : Fredric Brown; Teleplay by : Bernard C. Schoenfeld	Russell Collins as Johnny, Harold J. Stone as Halloran	April 28, 1957
Practical joker newspaperman Halloran (Stone) tells stories of pranks with colleague Ned (R. Ross) at the local bar. Halloran, despite the protests of bartender Nick (Burns) and patrons Jim (Howat), Timothy (M. Ross), and Joe (Wever) and with the help of a fellow reporter (Ellis), convinces homeless man and drunk widower Johnny (Collins) that the world will end at 11:45 that night. With nothing to lose, Johnny steals expensive imported cognac from liquor store owner Mr. Stern (Brinegar). He then unwittingly frightens well-meaning spinster Felicia Green (Barrett), whom he met in the park and who invited him to her home to clean up. She screams for help to a boarder (Corden) who grabs Johnny and calls the police, but Johnny escapes his grasp. He then breaks into a store to give presents to three young, orphaned boys (Shearer, Herbert, Miller) whom he has just met. He fatefully grabs and loads one of the guns sold at the store to impress one of the boys. Increasingly unhinged, he shoots (apparently killing) the store's security guard (Marr) with the gun after the guard tries to apprehend him. When Johnny finally realizes what Halloran did after reviewing the days' real newspapers at a news-stand, he returns to the bar and shoots him at exactly 11:45. Supporting Cast: Edith Barrett as Felicia Green, Bart Burns as Nick the Bartender, Clark Howat as Jim the Bar Patron, Paul Brinegar as Mr. Stern, Ned Wever as Joe the Bar Patron, Robert Ross as Ned the Bar Patron, Mike Ross as Timothy the Bar Patron, Robert Ellis as Reporter, Henry Corden as Boarder, Harry Shearer as Street Kid, Charles Herbert as Street Kid, Billy Miller as Street Kid, Joe Marr as Security Guard
71	32	"The Hands of Mr. Ottermole"	Robert Stevens	Story by : Thomas Burke; Teleplay by : Francis Cockrell	Theodore Bikel as Sergeant Ottermole, Rhys Williams as Summers the journalist, Torin Thatcher as Constable Johnson	May 5, 1957
In 1919 London, a serial killer is stalking the streets, killing by strangulation a husband, Herbert Whybrow (Gould-Porter), and wife (Plowright), as well as an elderly flower seller (O'Mahoney). Whybrow's nephew (Harvey) questions the first officer to arrive on the scene, Sergeant Ottermole (Bikel), while neighbors (Welch, Roden) and pry. The city is filled with fear, and the police, led by Ottermole, are stumped, leaving reporters (Davis) to question police capabilities. Ottermole insures that bartender Ben (McCallion) closes on time due to the number of deaths occurring. Even a policeman, Peterson (Trayne), is brutally strangled with no witnesses. A blind man (Hamer) has heard the killer whistle but cannot identify him otherwise. Constable Johnson (Thatcher) believes that there is no motive for the killings and the murderer is not English, but The Guardian journalist Summers (Williams) suspects that the killer has to be someone that people take for granted, and he helps trap the true killer: Sergeant Ottermole, who claims that his hands are out of his control after trying to strangle Summers. Supporting Cast: Arthur Gould-Porter (credited as A.E. Gould-Porter) as Herbert Whybrow, Gerald Hamer as Jimmy the Blindman, Hilda Plowright as Mrs. Whybrow, James McCallion as Ben the Bartender, John Trayne as Policeman Peterson, Charles Davis as Reporter, Nora O'Mahoney (credited as Nora O'Mahony) as Flower Lady, Barry Harvey as Whybrow's Nephew, Nelson Welch as Neighbor, Mollie Roden as Neighbor
72	33	"A Man Greatly Beloved"	James Neilson	Story by : A. A. Milne; Teleplay by : Sarett Rudley	Sir Cedric Hardwicke as "John Anderson", Evelyn Rudie as Hildegard Fell, Hugh Marlowe as Reverend Richard Fell	May 12, 1957
Precocious, gap-toothed little Hildegard Fell (Rudie) attaches herself to the grumpy, reclusive newcomer in the (fictional) town of Essington, Massachusetts, John Anderson (Hardwicke), which she narrates for the audience. She discusses her minister father, Reverend Richard Fell (Marlowe), and lovely homemaker mother (Welles). Anderson is quite the hermit, desiring only to play chess with himself, but Hildegard refuses to give up on trying to befriend him, and she even beats him at chess. She also offers to set him up with neighbor and medium-aspirant Aggie Whiteford (Barrett). Hildegard's friend Clarence (Culp), whom she aspires to marry, is a Bostonian who uncovers John Anderson's identity as a retired Boston judge who had put many criminals away. Thanks to Hildegard's friendship, John opens up to the townspeople and is loved by all for his kindness and generosity, as he even allowed the church bazaar to be held in his garden and donated a stained-glass window to the church. He makes many new friends, including sportsmen (Christy) and those who make great desserts (Bennett), and he helps Hildegard and Aggie conduct a seance, which reveals Anderson's identity to the town. After Anderson's death, Clarence discovers that "John Anderson" was actually one of the criminals whom the real Judge Anderson had sentenced to prison. His real name was John Lofton and he served 15 years for killing his wife. Supporting Cast: Robert Culp as Clarence, Edith Barrett as Aggie Whiteford, Rebecca Welles as Mrs. Fell, Ken Christy as Dart Thrower, Marjorie Bennett as Cake Lady (uncredited)
73	34	"Martha Mason, Movie Star"	Justus Addiss	Story by : Raymond Mason; Teleplay by : Robert C. Dennis	Judith Evelyn as Mabel McKay, Robert Emhardt as Henry G. McKay	May 19, 1957
Mabel McKay (Evelyn) is fascinated by a movie star named Martha Mason and sees her movies dutifully. She believes she looks like Mason although nobody else agrees. Mabel believes her husband Henry (Emhardt) is in the way of her dreams of glamour and when he refuses her request for a divorce and points out she would get no alimony, she kills him with a hammer and buries him in their garden while narrating herself as the true victim. When Henry's boss Mr. Abernathy (Hayworth) calls the next morning, she sets up a story that Henry left her for another woman. She even writes a fake goodbye letter from Henry with a surprisingly convincing signature. She insists on filing a police report despite Abernathy's strong opposition, and he leaves in a huff. A police detective (Lane)'s investigation reveals there actually really WAS another woman in Henry's life, Cora (Norris). Cora tells Mabel what she told the police, that she and Henry were together every Thursday when his wife thought he was at his fraternal lodge meeting and that he would have never left town without her. This prompted the police to check Mabel's house where they discovered Henry's body under the lilies which flourished from the new fertilizer he used shortly before his death. The police called Mabel in under the pretense of filling out paperwork. Mabel faints into the arms of a young policeman, finally achieving a Martha Mason-style pose. Supporting Cast: Vinton Hayworth as Mr. Abernathy, Karen Norris as Cora, Rusty Lane as Police Detective
74	35	"The West Warlock Time Capsule"	Justus Addiss	Story by : J. P. Cahn; Teleplay by : Marian Cockrell	Henry Jones as George Tiffany, Mildred Dunnock as Louise Tiffany	May 26, 1957
Taxidermist George Tiffany (Jones) sells a ram's head to a customer (Stone) when interested youth Charlie (Clark) arrives to inquire about the process of taxidermy, as he is interested in becoming an apprentice. George is distressed when his wife Louise (Dunnock) invites her good-for-nothing brother Waldren (Buffington) into their home, as the siblings have been apart for twenty-five years. Waldren constantly pretends to be sick, refuses to work, and has Louise waiting on him hand and foot. When Dr. Rhody (Thorson) declares that Louise has succumbed to exhaustion and admits her to the hospital, George kills Waldren and stuffs him inside the mayor's (Watts) recently deceased horse, Napoleon, that is being prepared for the West Worlock town memorial and associated time capsule in a celebration; the movers (Philbrook) note how much heavier the load is than they thought that it would be. Supporting Cast: Sam Buffington as Waldren, Russell Thorson as Dr. Rhody, Bobby Clark as Charlie, Charles Watts as Mayor Herbert Ayres, James Philbrook as Horse Mover
75	36	"Father and Son"	Herschel Daugherty	Story by : Thomas Burke; Teleplay by : James Cavanagh	Edmund Gwenn as Joe Saunders	June 2, 1957
London, 1912. Shop owner Joe Saunders (Gwenn) refuses to give any more money to his spendthrift son, Sam (Davis). The two argue about Joe being an old lush and Sam being unable to hold down a job. Sam tries to borrow money from his supposed lady friend Mae (Light), a talented piano player, who threatens to leave him and go to Brighton. Sam tries to use Joe's shop to borrow money from lender Mr. Schiller, who also turns him away. Sam spies Joe hiding his friend of forty years, and wanted fugitive, Gus Harrison (Worlock) in the shop cellar. Hoping to collect a reward, Sam goes to the police and informs a sergeant (Trayne). Another sergeant (Sheridan) works to keep Sam patient while they wait. Gus, however, manages to escape after Mae calls Joe to warn him, and it is Joe that is brought to the station instead. Joe is hurt when he learns what Sam did, but Sam still takes the reward money of fifty quid from the police. While Joe is held by the police, Sam falls just outside the station and hurts his left knee. Supporting Cast: Charles Davis as Sam Saunders, Frederick Worlock as Gus Harrison, Pamela Light as Mae, George Pelling as Mr. Schiller, Dan Sheridan as Second Sergeant, John Trayne as First Sergeant
76	37	"The Indestructible Mr. Weems"	Justus Addiss	George F. Slavin	Robert Middleton as Brother Cato Stone, Joe Mantell as Brother Harry Brown, Russell Collins as Clarence Weems	June 9, 1957
Brothers of a Lodge have trouble getting people to buy plots in their Elysium Park cemetery project, which worries their leader, Brother Cato Stone (Middlestone). Brother Bronksy suggests turning the property into a park. Brother Harry Brown (Mantell) suggests they ask former member Clarence Weems (Collins), who is elderly and sick, to be their first customer, in return for $50 per week income. Brother Dr. Elkins (Keefer) confirms that Weems is sickly and ideal. They go to see Harry's fiancée Laura Weems, Clarence's daughter, before speaking to Mr. Weems himself. Mr. Weems accepts, but then gets better, having taken the contract as a challenge to rejuvenate his life, with him even falling romantically for house servant Sara Collins (Hurlbut), the widow of a former lodge member. Weems' doctor, Dr. Allen (Newton), agrees that Clarence has become a new man, rejuvenated by the Lodge brothers' friendship and lifetime annuity. After months of Weems not dying, the brothers decide to buy him out of the contract for $500, but in the excitement of seeing Weems moving a piano, Brother Cato dies of a heart attack. After a funeral presided over by Reverend Newton, he becomes the first to be buried in their cemetery instead, in the plot donated by Mr. Weems. Supporting Cast: Rebecca Welles as Laura Weems, Theodore Newton as Dr. Allen, Don Keefer as Brother Dr. Elkins, Harry Bellaver as Brother Bronsky, Gladys Hurlbut as Sara Collins, Ferdi Hoffman as Reverend Newton, Ted Bliss as Man at Funeral
77	38	"A Little Sleep"	Paul Henreid	Story by : Joe Grenzeback; Teleplay by : Robert C. Dennis	Barbara Cook as Barbie Hallem, Vic Morrow as Benny Mungo	June 16, 1957
Barbie Hallem (Cook) uses her beauty to play with men's hearts, especially in public before partygoers (Chandler). She enjoys teasing her boyfriend, Chris Kymer (Carlyle) to get her drinks, all the while sneaking off the make out with others, such as Austin (Kennedy). During a party one night, she suddenly decides to drive alone into the mountains to visit her cabin. She stops at a diner for coffee, where proprietor Ed Mungo (Karnes) warns her of a wanted fugitive, Ed's brother Benny Mungo (Morrow). A diner customer (Mullaney) provides her with the specifics before she heads onward. When she arrives at the cabin, Benny is hiding out at the cabin. They amicably share a beer and dance to music. Barbie is seemingly unaware that he is being hunted by townsfolk specifically for the murder of the woman he loves. Benny admits only to killing a dog, saying the woman, Marcella, was asleep when he left. Ed arrives and tries to separate Barbie and Benny, but Ed's behavior frightens Barbie. Ed and Benny fight, and Benny manages to knock out Ed. Although Barbie believes that Benny has been framed by his brother, Benny declares that the woman he murdered ("put to sleep") was just like Barbie, and he snaps her neck. Supporting Cast: Douglas Kennedy as Austin, Robert Karnes as Ed Mungo, John Carlyle as Chris Kymer, George Chandler as Partygoer, Jack Mullaney as Diner Customer
78	39	"The Dangerous People"	Robert Stevens	Story by : Fredric Brown; Teleplay by : Francis Cockrell	Albert Salmi as Jones, Robert H. Harris as Bellefontaine	June 23, 1957
Lawyer Bellefontaine (Harris), from Milwaukee, and accountant Jones (Salmi), from Madison, are waiting for their train in the station's isolated waiting room. When they learn from the ticket agent (Tyler) that an inmate has escaped from a nearby criminal asylum, which is the reason for alarms sounding from five miles away, both men suspect the other of being said inmate, especially as Jones wears worn clothes and Bellefontaine possesses a gun. They are about to attack each other when the real inmate (Clark), dressed as a police officer, enters the waiting room. They try to send hints about each other to the "policeman", but he quickly tells them how he killed an officer and stole his uniform. They work together to subdue the inmate, taking just enough time before the orderlies (Armstrong) arrive to take him into custody. It turns out that Jones' clothes were muddy from falling while drunk, while Bellefontaine's gun is actually his client's war revolver. Supporting Cast: Ken Clark as "Policeman" / Inmate, Harry Tyler as Ticket Agent, David Armstrong as Asylum Intern
