= Isaac Asimov Presents The Great SF Stories 2 (1940) =

1979 anthology of short stories edited by Isaac Asimov and Martin H. Greenberg

- First edition cover
- Editors: Isaac Asimov; Martin H. Greenberg
- Cover artist: Jack Gaughan
- Language: English
- Series: Isaac Asimov Presents The Great SF Stories
- Genre: Science fiction
- Publisher: DAW Books
- Publication date: August 1979
- Publication place: United States
- Media type: Print (hardback & paperback)
- Preceded by: Isaac Asimov Presents The Great SF Stories 1 (1939)
- Followed by: Isaac Asimov Presents The Great SF Stories 3 (1941)

Isaac Asimov Presents The Great SF Stories 2 (1940) is an English language anthology of science fiction short stories edited by Isaac Asimov and Martin H. Greenberg. The series attempts to list the great science fiction stories from the Golden Age of Science Fiction. They date the Golden Age as beginning in 1939 and lasting until 1963. The book was later reprinted as the second half of Isaac Asimov Presents The Golden Years of Science Fiction with the first half being Isaac Asimov Presents The Great SF Stories 1 (1939).

This volume was originally published by DAW books in August 1979.

== Contents ==
- "Requiem" by Robert A. Heinlein
- "The Dwindling Sphere" by Williard Hawkins
- "The Automatic Pistol" by Fritz Leiber
- "Hindsight" by Jack Williamson
- "Postpaid to Paradise" by Robert Arthur
- * "Coventry" by Robert A. Heinlein
- "Into the Darkness" by Ross Rocklynne
- "Dark Mission" by Lester del Rey
- "It" by Theodore Sturgeon
- "Vault of the Beast" by A. E. van Vogt
- "The Impossible Highway" by Oscar J. Friend
- "Quietus" by Ross Rocklynne
- * "Blowups Happen" by Robert A. Heinlein
- "Strange Playfellow" by Isaac Asimov
- "The Warrior Race" by L. Sprague de Camp
- "Farewell to the Master" by Harry Bates
- "Butyl and the Breather" by Theodore Sturgeon
- "The Exalted" by L. Sprague de Camp
- "Old Man Mulligan" by P. Schuyler Miller

A set of stories by Robert A. Heinlein were intended for this volume but arrangements for their use could not be made. Greenberg and Asimov's notes for each are included in their stead.
