= Worlds Unknown =

1970s science fiction comic book

- Worlds Unknown #4 (Nov. 1973), with cover art by former DC Comics editor Dick Giordano in a rare work for Marvel.

Publication information
- Publisher: Marvel Comics
- Publication date: May 1973 to August 1974
- No. of issues: 8

Worlds Unknown was a science fiction comic book published by American company Marvel Comics in the 1970s, which adapted classic short stories of that genre, including works by Frederik Pohl, Harry Bates, and Theodore Sturgeon.

== Publication history ==
Marvel Comics' science fiction anthology Worlds Unknown ran eight issues, cover-dated May 1973 to August 1974. The title was one of four launched by Marvel Comics editor-in-chief Roy Thomas to form a line of science fiction and horror anthologies with more thematic cohesiveness than the company's earlier attempts that decade, which had included such series as Chamber of Darkness and Tower of Shadows. Whereas those titles generally presented original stories, these new books would instead adapt genre classics and other works.

With the four titles' debuts set to be staggered over the course of four months, Marvel premiered Journey into Mystery vol. 2 (Oct. 1972), Chamber of Chills (Nov. 1972), Supernatural Thrillers (Dec. 1972), and, with a late start, Worlds Unknown (May 1973). The first issue featured Frederik Pohl's "The Day After the Day the Martians Came," adapted by writer Gerry Conway and artist Ralph Reese, and "He that Hath Wings", adapted by writer-penciler Gil Kane from a 1934 Edmond Hamilton story published in the pulp magazine Popular Fiction. It also included a story from Marvel's 1950s predecessor, Atlas Comics: the three-page "Nightmare at Noon", with art by Angelo Torres, from Astonishing #54 (Oct. 1956).

Subsequent issues included such adaptations as L. Sprague de Camp's 1956 "A Gun for Dinosaur", by writer Thomas and penciler Val Mayerik (#2); Harry Bates' 1940 "Farewell to the Master", with Thomas and penciler Ross Andru adapting the source material of the film classic The Day the Earth Stood Still (#3); Fredric Brown's 1944 "Arena", with Conway and penciler John Buscema on a short story previously adapted for an episode of the TV series Star Trek (#4); A. E. van Vogt's first published SF story, "Black Destroyer" (1939), by Thomas and penciler Dan Adkins (#5); and Ted Sturgeon's 1944 "Killdozer", by Conway and penciler Dick Ayers (#6).

The final two issues changed direction and featured an adaptation of the contemporaneous film The Golden Voyage of Sinbad (1974), based on the screenplay by Brian Clemens and the story by Clemens and Ray Harryhausen. Titled The Golden Voyage of Sinbad: Land of the Lost, it was by writer Len Wein and penciler George Tuska. Although Marvel had announced plans to follow the Sinbad adaptation with a new, original lead feature titled "Cyborg", it instead cancelled the comic and ran the feature in Astonishing Tales as "Deathlok".

Five months after the title's cancellation, Marvel would revisit the idea of science fiction story adaptations with the black-and-white comics magazine Unknown Worlds of Science Fiction, which ran for six issues plus an annual from 1975 to 1976.

== Critical assessment ==
Critic David A. Roach wrote of the series: "[T]he best issues are those featuring Gil Kane or Ralph Reese.... The first Worlds Unknown manages this with stunning Reese art on Fred Pohl's "The Day After the Day the Martians Came!" (adapted by Gerry Conway) and lyrical Kane drawings for Ed Hamilton's "He That Hath Wings", which the artist also scripted".
