= Isaac Asimov Presents The Great SF Stories 1 (1939) =

1979 collection of short stories edited by Isaac Asimov and Martin H. Greenberg

- First edition cover
- Editors: Isaac Asimov; Martin H. Greenberg
- Cover artist: Jack Gaughan
- Language: English
- Series: Isaac Asimov Presents The Great SF Stories
- Genre: Science fiction
- Publisher: DAW Books
- Publication date: March 1979
- Publication place: United States
- Media type: Print (hardback & paperback)
- Followed by: Isaac Asimov Presents The Great SF Stories 2 (1940)

Isaac Asimov Presents The Great SF Stories 1 (1939) is an American collection of short stories, edited by Isaac Asimov and Martin H. Greenberg, originally published by DAW books in March 1979. It contains science fiction stories selected by the editors that were published in the year 1939. The book is part of a 25 volume series. Each successive volume in the series contains stories from the next year, continuing through 1963. The series starts with 1939 because Asimov had previously published a three volume anthology series titled, "Before the Golden Age", covering years 1931 - 1938, which he considered to be definitive for those years. According to DAW, The Great SF Stories 1 (1939) "is the first in what Isaac Asimov plans to be a definitive series of sf anthologies, covering year by year the truly memorable stories that have progressively brought science fiction to its present prominence". The second volume of the series is Isaac Asimov Presents The Great SF Stories 2 (1940).

Each volume in the series begins with a two part introduction that describes the important events of 1939 "in the world outside reality" (normal historical events) and "in the real world" (event within the science fiction community). Each stories also features a short introduction by each editor.

== Contents ==
- "I, Robot" by Eando Binder
- "The Strange Flight of Richard Clayton" by Robert Bloch
- "Trouble With Water" by Horace L. Gold
- "Cloak of Aesir" by Don A. Stuart
- "The Day is Done" by Lester del Rey
- "The Ultimate Catalyst" by John Taine
- "The Gnarly Man" by L. Sprague de Camp
- "Black Destroyer" by Alfred E. van Vogt
- "Greater Than Gods" by Catherine L. Moore
- "Trends" by Isaac Asimov
- "The Blue Giraffe" by L. Sprague De Camp
- "The Misguided Halo" by Henry Kuttner
- "Heavy Planet" by Milton A. Rothman
- "Life-Line" by Robert A. Heinlein
- "Ether Breather" by Theodore Sturgeon
- "Pilgrimage" by Nelson Bond
- "Rust" by Joseph E. Kelleam
- "The Four-Sided Triangle" by William F. Temple
- "Star Bright" by Jack Williamson
- "Misfit" by Robert A. Heinlein

== Reception ==
Writing for Strange Horizons in 2010, Alvaro Zinos-Amaro described the series as essential read for modern SF fans, stating that "if we wish to fully understand today's work, we need to be at least somewhat familiar with its ancestry." He goes on to review the various stories individually, discussing how they have aged and their value to the modern reader. AsimovReviews.net describes this volume as "an excellent volume in an excellent series."
