= Arena (Star Trek: The Original Series) =

- Star Trek: The Original Series episode
- Episode no.: Season 1 Episode 18
- Directed by: Joseph Pevney
- Story by: Fredric Brown
- Teleplay by: Gene L. Coon
- Cinematography by: Jerry Finnerman
- Production code: 019
- Original air date: January 19, 1967
- Running time: 50 minutes (runtime)

Guest appearances
- Carole Shelyne – The Metron; Grant Woods – Lt. Kelowitz; Sean Kenney – Lt. DePaul; Jerry Ayres – O'Herlihy; Tom Troupe – Lt. Harold; James Farley – Lang; Bill Blackburn, Bobby Clark, Gary Combs – Gorn (uncredited); Ted Cassidy – Gorn (voice) (uncredited)

Episode chronology
← Previous "The Squire of Gothos"	Next → "Tomorrow Is Yesterday"
- Star Trek: The Original Series season 1

"Arena" is the 18th episode of the first season of the American science fiction television series Star Trek. Written by Gene L. Coon (based on a 1944 short story of the same name by Fredric Brown) and directed by Joseph Pevney, the episode was first broadcast on January 19, 1967.

In the episode, while pursuing a Gorn vessel for an apparently unprovoked attack on a Federation outpost, Captain Kirk is forced by powerful entities to battle the opposing captain.

== Plot ==
The USS Enterprise arrives at the Cestus III Outpost by invitation of its commanding officer, but the crews find the outpost obliterated. Captain Kirk, First Officer Spock, Chief Medical Officer Dr. McCoy, and a security force beam down to find one survivor, who says the base came under heavy bombardment from an unknown enemy. The landing party finds themselves under fire from nearby, with two of the security team killed in the initial volley. The Enterprise is also under attack from an unknown vessel, preventing the crew from beaming up the landing party. On the surface, Kirk finds a grenade launcher from the outpost's stores, and uses it to scatter the alien forces. The alien ship recovers its crew from the surface and begins to retreat. The landing party is beamed back aboard Enterprise before they give chase.

Both ships enter an unexplored sector of space, and shortly thereafter, lose all propulsion power. Enterprise is contacted by a species calling themselves the Metrons, who zealously guard their sector of space from intrusion. They announce that they will pit the respective captains against each other in "trial by combat", a one-to-one battle to the death, with the ship of the losing captain to be destroyed and the other ship free to leave. Captain Kirk is suddenly transported to the surface of a rocky, barren asteroid along with the captain of the other ship, who is of a reptilian species known as the Gorn. The Metrons speak to Kirk, explaining that while neither captain has communication with his ship, each has been given a vocal recording device that will transmit his words to his ship; however, they are unaware that they also translate their words to the opposing captain, as well. Kirk is told that the asteroid has numerous resources either captain can use to defeat the other. Aboard Enterprise, the crew is allowed to watch Kirk's actions.

Kirk attempts to communicate with the Gorn, but receives no response. The Gorn tracks down Kirk, and Kirk realizes he is outmatched physically and relies on his speed and agility to outrun the Gorn. Kirk gets caught in a rope trap set by the Gorn that injures his leg and slows him down. The Gorn finally communicates with Kirk via the translation device and offers to put him out of his misery. Kirk accuses the Gorn of being butchers, but the alien defends their attack on Cestus III, stating the outpost had been built in what the Gorn considered to be their territory. They viewed the Federation's presence in this part of space as an intrusion and a possible prelude to full-scale invasion.

Trying to stay ahead of the Gorn, Kirk discovers numerous valuable minerals and resources on the asteroid, seemingly useless at this point. He is inspired upon finding stalks of bamboo and raw chemicals that can be mixed into a black powder formula. He constructs a makeshift weapon, using chunks of diamond as ammunition. Kirk barely completes the assembly as the Gorn arrives, and fires it, severely wounding the Gorn. As Kirk prepares to deal a death blow, he considers the Gorn's claims that the attack on Cestus III was only in self-defense, and allows him to live. Suddenly, the Gorn disappears, and a Metron appears to Kirk, congratulating him on not only winning the battle but showing the advanced trait of mercy for one's enemy. Kirk declines the Metrons' offer to destroy the Gorn ship, leading the Metron to comment, "you are still half savage, but there is hope", and that the Federation should seek out the Metrons again in several thousand years' time. Suddenly, Kirk finds himself back aboard Enterprise, his injuries healed, and the crew finds itself 500 parsecs from Metron space, with the Gorn ship nowhere in range.

== Production ==
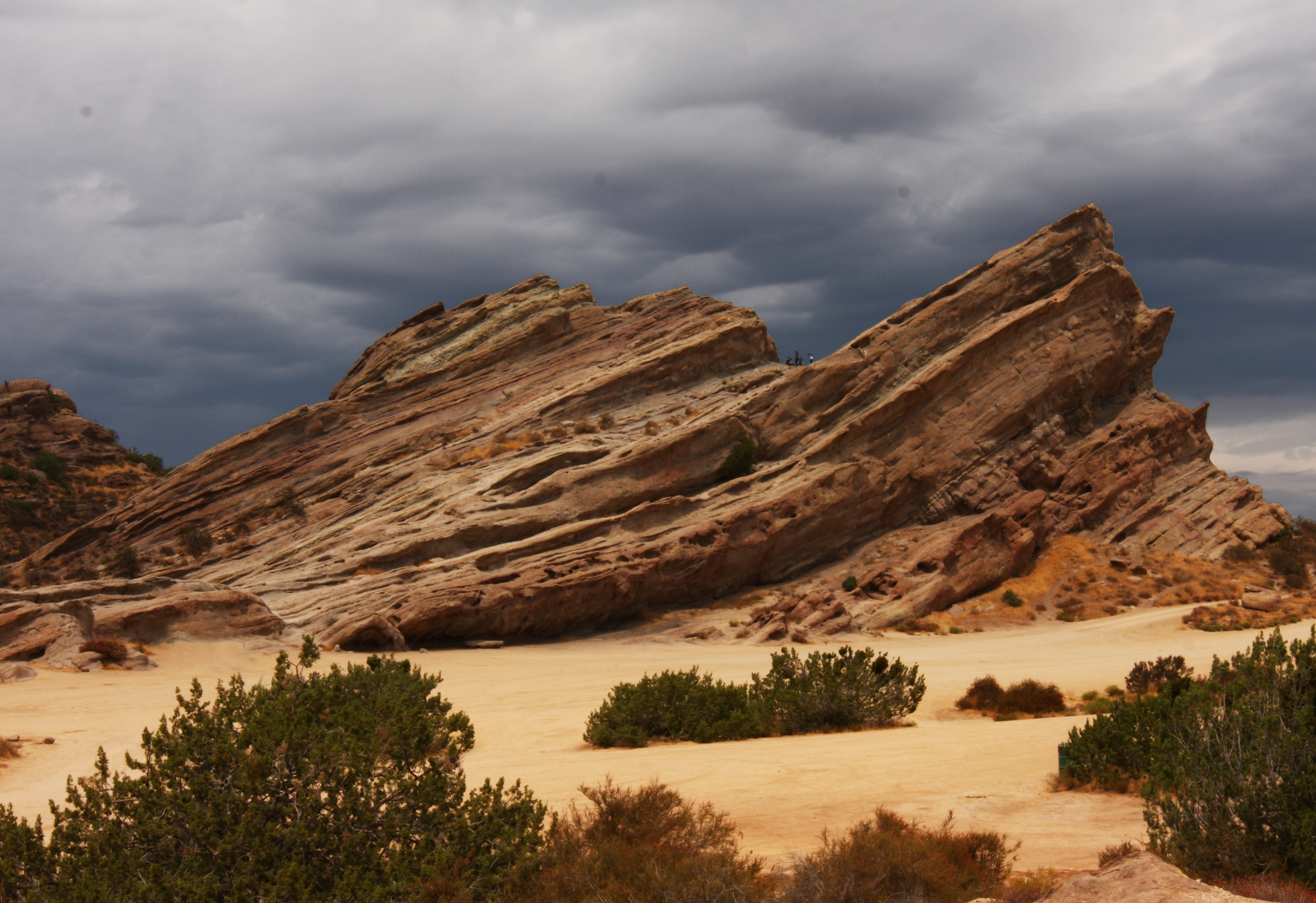
Vasquez Rocks

The episode was filmed in part on location at Vasquez Rocks, which was subsequently used as a shooting location in other Star Trek episodes and films.

The episode marked the directorial debut of Joseph Pevney, who was hired by Gene L. Coon.

The Gorn captain's vocalizations were provided by actor Ted Cassidy, who also appeared in person in the Star Trek episode "What Are Little Girls Made Of?" and provided the menacing voice of Balok in the episode "The Corbomite Maneuver". The Gorn was portrayed by stuntmen Bobby Clark and Gary Combs and by extra Bill Blackburn in close-ups.

William Shatner recalls standing too close to a stage prop explosion during the filming of the episode, causing tinnitus, which became chronic. Leonard Nimoy was also afflicted. Shatner has it in his left ear and Nimoy had it in his right ear.

=== Remastered version ===
To celebrate Star Trek's 40th anniversary in 2006, CBS Paramount Domestic Television (now known as CBS Media Ventures) began syndication of an enhanced version of Star Trek: The Original Series in high definition with new CGI visual effects. The remastered version of "Arena" features redone effects for the Enterprise and a new background for Cestus III, as well as the addition of the Gorn's eyes blinking.

== Writing ==
"Arena" was the first episode scripted by Gene L Coon. According to an account by Herbert F. Solow in the book Inside Star Trek, The Real Story, the episode's similarity to the often-reprinted Fredric Brown original short story may have come from a subconscious inspiration. After Coon had written what he believed to be an entirely original script, Desilu's research department, headed by Kellam de Forest, noted the similarity. It was therefore agreed that Desilu's business affairs office would call Brown and offer a fair price for the story, before it was shot and broadcast. Brown, not knowing that the script had already been written, was granted screen credit for the story.

== Connections ==
This episode introduced elements to the Star Trek canon, including the Gorn species, the Metron species, and the planet Cestus III. Cestus III is mentioned later as the home planet of Star Trek: Deep Space Nine character Kasidy Yates, and is referenced in noncanonical Star Trek novels.

In the 2010s, actor William Shatner re-enacted his battle fighting the Gorn for an advertisement for the 2013 Star Trek video game (Kelvin timeline). In the spot they have a similar fight, but it takes place in a modern-day living room and starts with the two playing the video game together in co-op mode.

The Gorn reappear several times in the prequel series Star Trek: Strange New Worlds which establishes that while official first contact with the Gorn had not yet occurred by the time of "Arena," the Federation was well aware of their existence with the Enterprise even preventing a full-scale Gorn invasion of Federation space several years before "Arena." In "Memento Mori," La'An Noonien Singh, a descendant of Khan Noonien Singh, explains that plenty of people have seen the Gorn before, they just never lived to talk about it.

The Star Trek: Strange New Worlds season 3 episode "Terrarium" serves as a prequel to this episode with Lieutenant Erica Ortegas and a Gorn pilot forced into a similar situation by the Metrons several years earlier who wanted to see if peace between humans and the Gorn was possible. Unlike Kirk and the Gorn captain, Ortegas and the Gorn pilot cooperate with and befriend each other, but La'An kills the Gorn upon arriving to rescue Ortegas. At the end of "Terrarium," the Metron erases Ortegas' memory of their meeting and suggests that the Metrons will study the situation further in the future.

== Reception ==
In 2009, Zack Handlen of The A.V. Club gave the episode an 'A−' rating, noting the episode's influence and noting the use of a theme of Star Trek, the "uncertainty of exploration".

In 2010, SciFiNow ranked this in the top-10 episodes of the original series.

In 2013, The Hollywood Reporter, ranked the Kirk vs. Gorn fight as one of the top-15 key moments of the original series.

In 2016, Newsweek ranked "Arena" as one of the best episodes of the original series, and noted it was a popular episode. That same year, Empire ranked this the 41st-best out of the top 50 episodes of all the 700-plus Star Trek television episodes. They note that Kirk wins in this episode, not by killing the Gorn, but by showing mercy, which impresses the powerful aliens who pitted them against each other. IGN ranked "Arena" number 10 in a top ten list of the original series episodes. Radio Times ranked the battle between Kirk and the Gorn, as the seventh-best moment of all Star Trek film and television. They noted that the action scene was filmed at the Vasquez Rocks in Southern California. They also praised Shatner's unique acting style in his mission logs, and noted how many aspects of this episode are great examples of the science-fiction genre in this period.

In 2017, Business Insider ranked "Arena" the 12th-best episode of the original series. That same year, ahead of the debut of Star Trek: Discovery, Patrick Cooley of The Plain Dealer ranked "Arena" as the sixth-best episode in the first 50 years of the Star Trek franchise.

In 2018, Collider ranked this episode the seventh-best original series episode. They praised the Gorn costume and noted that this episode introduced the powerful Metron aliens.

In 2019, Nerdist included this episode on their "Best of Kirk" binge-watching guide. That same year, Comic Book Resources ranked "Arena" as one of the top-eight most memorable episodes of the original Star Trek.

In 2020, PopMatters ranked "Arena" the sixth-best episode of the original series.
