= The Fabulous Clipjoint =

Book by Fredric Brown

- First edition
- Author: Fredric Brown
- Language: English
- Series: Ed and Am Hunter mysteries
- Genre: mystery, detective fiction
- Publisher: Dutton
- Publication date: 1947
- Publication place: United States
- Pages: 224
- Followed by: The Dead Ringer

The Fabulous Clipjoint, first published in book form in 1947 (originally published under the title Dead Man's Indemnity in Mystery Book magazine, April 1946), is the first full-length novel by writer Fredric Brown, who had honed his craft by publishing hundreds of short stories in the pulp magazines of the day. The Fabulous Clipjoint is also the first of seven detective novels featuring the nephew/uncle team of Ed and Am Hunter. The subsequent novels in the series are The Dead Ringer, The Bloody Moonlight, Compliments of a Fiend, Death Has Many Doors, The Late Lamented, and Mrs Murphy's Underpants.

== Plot ==
When teenaged Ed Hunter's alcoholic father is murdered, Ed is for all intents and purposes orphaned, as he feels little affection for his mean-spirited stepmother and hypersexual stepsister. The police dismiss the case as nothing more than the random murder of a back-alley drunk, and so Ed decides to investigate the crime on his own.

Ed enlists the help of his father's brother, Ambrose "Am" Hunter, an itinerant carny, whom he has not seen in many years, and the two of them set out to solve the crime. Together they wade through a swamp of unseemly characters of the Chicago underworld to expose the real murderer of Ed's father. Along the way, with Am's guidance, Ed comes to realize that his father was not the hapless, pathetic man he had always believed him to be.

== Critical reception ==
The Fabulous Clipjoint, like most of Brown's works, is notable for its solid craftsmanship, atmosphere, and suspense. In 1948 it received the Edgar Award for Best First Novel.
