= Arena (short story) =

- Short story by Fredric Brown
- Language: English
- Genre: Science fiction

Publication
- Published in: Astounding Science Fiction
- Publication type: Magazine
- Publisher: Street & Smith
- Publication date: June 1944

"Arena" is a science fiction short story by American writer Fredric Brown, first published in the June 1944 issue of Astounding Science Fiction magazine. The members of the Science Fiction Writers of America selected it as one of the best science fiction stories published before the advent of the Nebula Awards, and as such it was included in The Science Fiction Hall of Fame, Volume One, 1929–1964.

Its most famous adaptation is in the American television series, Star Trek, with an episode of the same name.

== Plot summary ==
Amid escalating conflict between Earth and mysterious alien Outsiders, massive armadas from both sides are set to meet in what looks to be an evenly matched battle. Bob Carson, the pilot of a small one-man scout ship, blacks out while engaging with an Outsider counterpart. When he awakens, he finds himself naked in a small, enclosed, circular area about 250 yards (230 m) across. Most of the objects in the arena are blue, and the arena is, according to Carson, "unbearably hot", with no available water. In the distance is an Outsider, which Carson labels a "Roller" because its form is that of a red sphere about 1 yard (0.91 m) in diameter with about a dozen thin, retractable tentacles.

Carson hears a voice in his mind that identifies itself as an ancient intelligence, the fusion of an entire race, which has intervened because the war would utterly destroy one side and hurt the other so badly that it would not be able to possibly one day evolve into an intelligence like itself. The Entity therefore has chosen one individual from each species to fight in single combat in an arena outside of the normal flow of time. The loser will doom its fleet to instant destruction.

Carson and his opponent discover through trial and error that there is an invisible barrier between them, and that apparently only inanimate objects can cross it. Carson tries to communicate with the Roller, to see if a compromise is possible, but receives a mental message of unremitting hatred. The two begin fighting with hurled projectiles.

Carson is wounded in the leg; eventually blood poisoning sets in. He sees the Roller throw an apparently dead lizard it had tortured through the barrier, and discovers that the lizard had only been unconscious; Carson realizes that the barrier is a mental one. In desperation, he knocks himself out on a slope and rolls through to the other side. He regains consciousness and harpoons the cautiously approaching Roller, finishing it off with a knife he knapped from a flint-like rock.

Carson immediately finds himself back in his scout ship. He receives a jubilant message from his commander informing him that Earth's first salvo somehow caused the entire enemy fleet to disintegrate, even ships that were out of range. When Carson sees several newly healed scars where he had been wounded, he knows he did not imagine the fight, but wisely decides to keep his experience to himself.

== Adaptations ==
The 1967 Star Trek episode also called "Arena" had similarities. In order to avoid legal problems, it was agreed that Brown would receive payment and a story credit.

Issue 4 (November 1973) of the Marvel Comics anthology book Worlds Unknown, which adapted classic works of science fiction, featured a faithful adaptation of the story. A reprint appeared in the black-and-white comic magazine Unknown Worlds of Science Fiction.

Similar plots are also found in: issue 6 (Dec. 1952) of the Standard Comics comic book Lost Worlds (the text story "Peace Maker"), the 1963 Outer Limits episode "Fun and Games", the Blake's 7 episode "Duel", the He-Man and the Masters of the Universe episode "The Arena", a Batman Versus Predator original comic book crossover mini-series, and in Star Trek: Strange New Worlds, Season 3 Episode 9, "Terrarium."
