= Bottle service =

Sale of liquor by the bottle in lounges and nightclubs

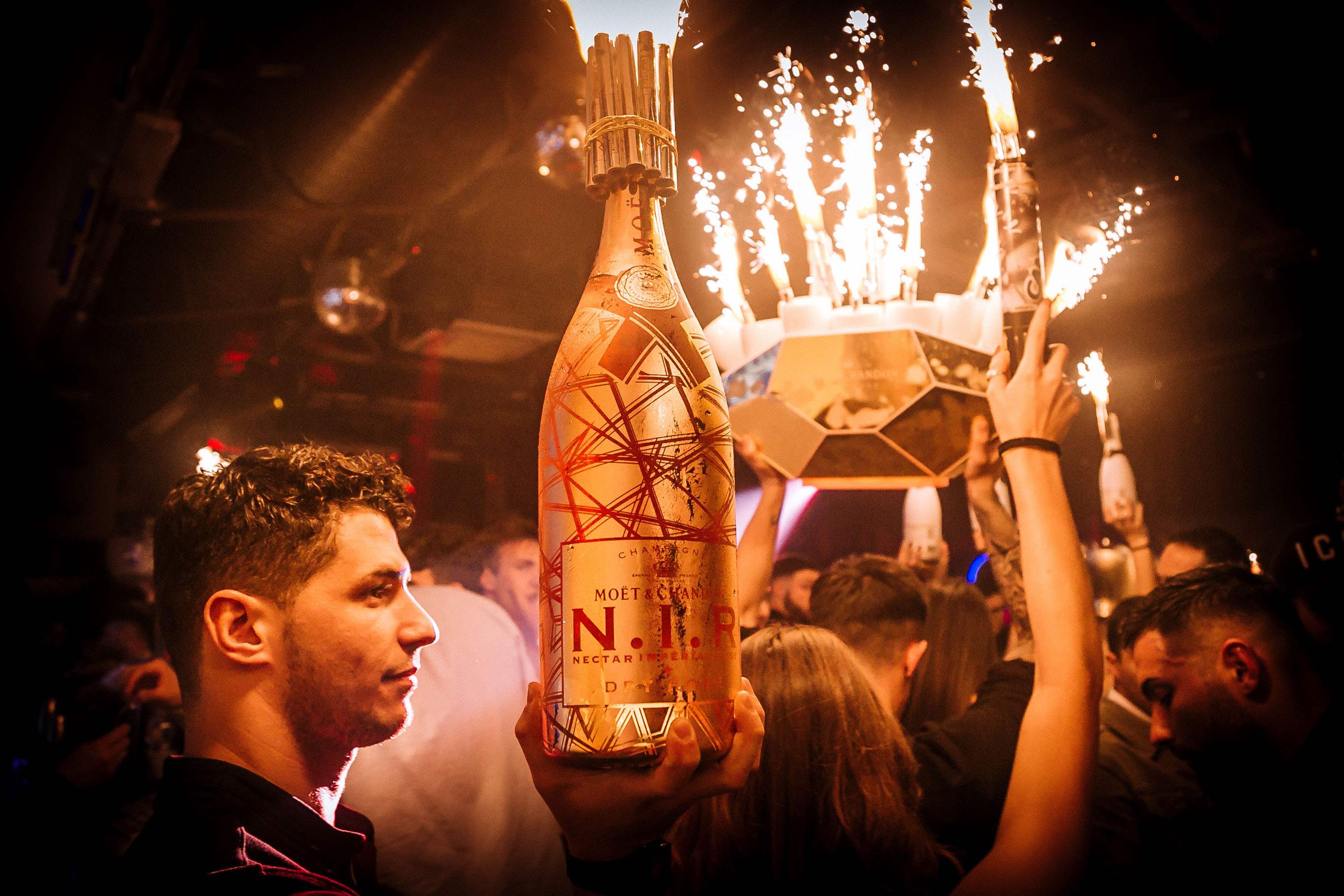
Bottle service in a nightclub in Rome, Italy (2019)

Bottle service is the sale of liquor by the bottle, mostly in North American lounges and nightclubs.

The purchase of bottle service typically includes a reserved table for the patron's party and mixers of the patron's choice. Bottle service can include the service of a cocktail waitress, colloquially known as bottle girls, who will ensure that a party of primarily male patrons have sufficient mixers and who will often make personalized drinks using the patrons' liquor bottle and mixers. The purchase of bottle service sometimes results in cover charge being waived for the purchaser's party and often allows patrons to bypass entrance lines. The gratuity is also often added automatically but portions of that go to security, porters, and back-of-the-house staff, in addition to the VIP host who serves the patron.

The cost of a bottle at such a lounge or club is usually significantly marked up, often by 1,000 percent or more, and can account for a significant portion of an establishment's revenue.

== History ==
Early forms of bottle service existed in World War II era Japan, where unfinished bottles would be stored. In its modern form, an early example was in 1988 at the Paris nightclub Les Bains-Douches, bottle service was introduced to deal with an excess of customer demand. In 1992, an early form was established at The Gate in Los Angeles by its managing partner, Edward Baquero. Baquero took inspiration from his time as Director of Operations at Stringfellows in Beverly Hills in 1990, specifically from its "Champagne room". He innovated this into the modern form of bottle service, designing a custom lazy Susan platform for tables with a carved-out ice bucket, tongs, mixers, and crystal ramekins for lemons and limes. This created a "bottle only" VIP Gallery space, where guests were required to purchase bottle service for spirits to book a table. The Los Angeles Times did note the club had a "roped-off area called the Gallery" that sold "magnums of Dom Perignon" for "$310". The modern form of bottle service was pioneered in 1995 by Michael Ault at Spy Bar in New York and in 1996, Chaos ($175 for a bottle of Stolichnaya vodka).

== Criticism ==
The cost of bottle service and the central position provided to purchasers of bottle service has led some critics to complain that bottle service is turning night clubs into elitist dens. Preferential treatment for purchasers of bottle service may include stopping the regular dance music when an especially expensive bottle is purchased and, instead, playing a theme song, or removing patrons from a table to make way for another patron and their party that purchased bottle service.

== See also ==
- Conspicuous consumption
