= Fredric Brown =

American novelist and short story author

- Fredric Brown, date unknown
- Born: October 29, 1906; Cincinnati, Ohio, U.S.
- Died: March 11, 1972 (aged 65); Tucson, Arizona, U.S.
- Occupations: Novelist, short story author
- Writing career
- Years active: 1936–1965
- Genres: Mystery, science fiction, fantasy, horror
- Notable works: The Fabulous Clipjoint; "Arena"

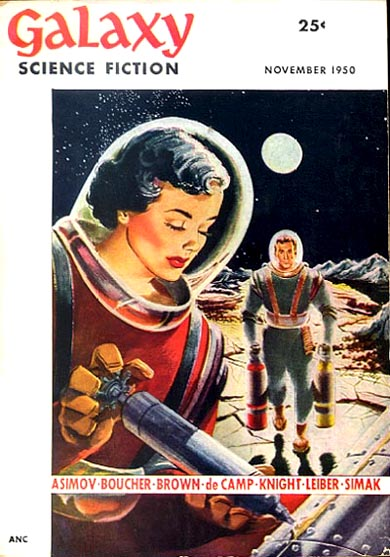
Brown's "Honeymoon in Hell" was the cover story in the second issue of Galaxy Science Fiction in 1950.

Fredric Brown (October 29, 1906 – March 11, 1972) was an American science fiction, fantasy, and mystery writer. He is known for his use of humor and for his mastery of the "short short" form—stories of one to three pages, often with ingenious plotting devices and surprise endings. Humor and a postmodern outlook carried over into his novels as well. One of his stories, "Arena", was adapted into a 1967 episode of the American television series Star Trek.

== Early life and education ==
Fredric William Brown, the only child of Karl Lewis and Emma Amelia Brown (née Graham), was born in Cincinnati, Ohio, on October 29, 1906 (and often wished he had been born two days later, on Halloween); he found a sad, piquant pleasure in recalling that 1906 was the year of the San Francisco Earthquake and the Atlanta Race Riot. His father Karl Brown was born in 1871 in Oxford, Ohio, son of Waldo Franklin Brown (1832–1907), a nationally familiar progressive agricultural writer and lecturer who edited the farm pages of The Cincinnati Enquirer and published articles under the name Johnny Plowboy. Karl was something of a get-rich-quick schemer, taking jobs in sales and secretarial correspondence, as well as serving as what one biographer calls "accountant—in the shady business enterprises of a substitute father figure, William P. Harrison, a pioneering if not overly scrupulous entrepreneur of direct mail marketing ... headquartered in Columbus and later, after Columbus had gotten too hot for him, Cincinnati." When Fred was little, Karl Brown was arrested for fraud and Harrison bailed him out. A few years later, Harrison was put on trial for further frauds which gained nationwide headlines and was imprisoned. Biographer Curtis Evans suggests that these childhood experiences led to the shady and downright corrupt figures who appear in Fredric's mystery novels.

Brown attended Hughes High School, where he was (following his father) a member of the Commercial Club and the Salesmanship Club, among others. Fred spent a year at Hanover College, Indiana, before returning to Cincinnati. There, he studied for a semester at the University of Cincinnati. His mother died when he was a teenager; biographers say it is likely that he worked for his father, who died when he was 19. His uncle Linn is thought to have given him an allowance from the life insurance money. (Note: Jack Seabrook's Martians and Misplaced Clues: The Life and Work of Fredric Brown is the best-known biography, but mystery scholar Curtis Evans takes issue with several of the dates and events Seabrook lays out, saying the study "is far more focused on the author's work than his life." "Seabrook then asserts that after graduation, Fred worked for a couple of years as a clerk in a 'machine tool jobbing firm.' While the next three years are blank, Seabrook tells us that in 1927 Fred spent a semester at Hanover College, a private Presbyterian school eighty miles away in Hanover, Indiana, followed in the fall with a semester at the University of Cincinnati, after which 'money ran out and he had no inclination to continue' life as a college boy... Unfortunately, this is a vague and often implausible and factually inaccurate chronology... Since we know that Karl managed a machine tool company (and was not, as Seabrook stated, a newspaperman), does it not seem likely the 'machine tool jobbing firm' which Seabrook says Fred worked for between 1922 and 1924 was actually his father's firm? And that he actually worked there in 1925 and 1926, between his high school graduation and his father's death? And that he started college in 1927, after his father died and he had left the employ of the machine tool company and his Uncle Linn was doling out to him insurance money? A big part of the confusion here stems from a literal reading of Fred's 1958 mainstream novel The Office, which like Cornell Woolrich's mainstream novel Hotel Room, coincidentally published the same year, draws on biographical elements from the author's own life, though these elements frequently are deliberately distorted.")

Brown was descended from Presbyterian families of Massachusetts and Vermont on his father's side, and from Scots-Irish in Pennsylvania on his mother's. His mother Emma was the daughter of a railroad mail clerk. His uncle was Linn Waldo Brown, a schoolteacher in Oxford, Ohio, whom Fredric often visited and would later name his second son after.

== Career ==
=== Day jobs ===
In 1929 he married and relocated to Milwaukee, working various jobs before settling into a career as a proofreader. Other work included writing for newspapers and magazines in the Midwest.

=== Writing ===
Duane Swierczynski wrote, "According to his wife, Brown hated to write, and did whatever he could to put it off: play his flute, challenge a friend to a game of chess, or tease Ming Tah, his Siamese cat." When Brown would have trouble with a certain story, he would take a long bus trip in order to sit and think for days on end. When he would finally return home to sit himself in front of the typewriter, he produced work in a variety of genres: mystery, science fiction, short fantasy, black comedy.

Many of his books make use of the threat of the supernatural or occult before the "straight" explanation comes at the end. For example, Night of the Jabberwock is a humorous narrative of an extraordinary day in the life of a small-town newspaper editor.

Brown began to sell mystery short stories to American magazines in 1936. His first science fiction story, "Not Yet the End", was published in the Winter 1941 issue of Captain Future.

Brown's first mystery novel, The Fabulous Clipjoint (1947), began a series starring Ed and Ambrose Hunter, depicting how a young man gradually ripens into a detective under the tutelage of his uncle, an ex–private eye now working as a carnival concessionaire.

His science fiction novel What Mad Universe (1949) is a parody of pulp science fiction story conventions.

The Lights in the Sky Are Stars (1952) tells the story of an aging astronaut who is trying to get his beloved space program back on track after Congress has cut its funding.

The short story "Answer" (1954) is thought to be the earliest representation of the "Yes, now there is a God" science fiction trope of a supercomputer that releases itself from human control. The story was originally published in Angels and Spaceships and the entire collection was later re-published as Star Shine for paperback adaptation.

Martians, Go Home (1955) is both a broad farce and a satire on human frailties as seen through the eyes of a billion jeering, invulnerable Martians who arrive not to conquer the world but to drive it crazy.

== Popularity and influence ==
=== Assessment by other authors ===
His 1945 short story "The Waveries" was described by Philip K. Dick as "what may be the most significant—startlingly so—story sci-fi has yet produced". Brown was one of three dedicatees of Robert A. Heinlein's 1961 novel Stranger in a Strange Land (the other two being Robert Cornog and Philip José Farmer). Philosopher and novelist Umberto Eco in his book On Ugliness describes Brown's short story "Sentry" as "one of the finest short stories produced by contemporary science fiction" and uses its twist ending as an example of how ugliness and aesthetics are relative to different cultures.

In The Annotated Alice (1960), Martin Gardner refers to Brown's Night of the Jabberwock as a "magnificently funny mystery novel ... an outstanding work of fiction that has close ties to the Alice books."

In his non-fiction book Danse Macabre (1981), a survey of the horror genre since 1950, writer Stephen King includes an appendix of "roughly one hundred" influential books of the period: Fredric Brown's short-story collection Nightmares and Geezenstacks is included, and is, moreover, asterisked as being among those select works King regards as "particularly important".

=== Critical reception ===
Brown's first mystery novel, The Fabulous Clipjoint, won the Edgar Award for outstanding first mystery novel. His short story "Arena" was voted by Science Fiction Writers of America as one of the top 20 science fiction stories written before 1965.

Several Brown works were selected by the New England Science Fiction Association for their 1997 NESFA Core Reading List of Fantasy and Science Fiction, which is designed to introduce readers to the core works and authors responsible for shaping the genres of science fiction and fantasy:

- 1941 "Armageddon"
- 1942 "The Star Mouse"
- 1943 "Daymare"
- 1944 "Arena"
- 1945 "Pi in the Sky" (nominated for the 1996 Retro-Hugo Award for Best Novelette)
- 1945 "The Waveries" (nominated for the 1946 Retro-Hugo Award for Best Short Story)
- 1946 "Placet Is a Crazy Place"
- 1948 "Knock"
- 1949 "Come and Go Mad"
- 1949 "Letter to a Phoenix"
- 1949 What Mad Universe (novel, expanded from shorter 1948 version)
- 1951 "The Weapon"
- 1953 "Hall of Mirrors"
- 1953 The Lights in the Sky Are Stars (novel)
- 1954 "Answer"
- 1954 Martians Go Home (novel, expanded from earlier novella of the same title)
- 1961 Nightmares and Geezenstacks (collection of short stories)

=== Adaptations ===
Brown's 1943 short story, "Madman's Holiday", was adapted into the 1946 RKO film Crack-Up. His novel The Screaming Mimi became a 1958 film starring Anita Ekberg and Gypsy Rose Lee and directed by Gerd Oswald.

The 1944 short story "Arena" bore similarities to the episode of the same name in the original Star Trek series. The title is the same, although the details of the conflict are different. In order to avoid legal problems, it was agreed that Brown would receive payment and a story credit. It was also adapted in 1973 for issue 4 of the Marvel Comics title Worlds Unknown.

Several of Brown's stories were adapted into episodes of Alfred Hitchcock Presents. "No Sanctuary", first published in 1945, was adapted by Francis Cockrell as "The Dangerous People", the final episode of the second season of the series. Robert Stevens directs, with Albert Salmi and Robert H. Harris starring as two men waiting in a train station who each suspect the other to be an asylum escapee. Brown is credited with adapting his 1950 short story "The Last Martian" as "Human Interest Story" in 1959. Directed by Norman Lloyd, it stars Steve McQueen, Arthur Hill, Tyler McVey, and William Challee. Sharing elements with a great many of Brown's stories, it is set in a bar and involves a newspaper reporter interviewing a man who claims to have been possessed by a Martian.

In Spain, his 1961 short story "Nightmare in Yellow" was adapted as El cumpleaños ("The Birthday"), the 1966 debut episode of Historias para no dormir. Another short story, 1954's "Naturally", was adapted as Geometria, a 1987 short film by director Guillermo del Toro.

=== In popular culture ===
In the third episode of the third season of Amazon's adaptation of Philip K. Dick's The Man In The High Castle, Oberstgruppenführer Smith remarks, when told of the possibility of travel between worlds, that "this is like something out of Fredric Brown", implying that Brown's work is known in the German-occupied areas of the former United States.

His novel The Lights in the Sky Are Stars gives its name to the final episode of 2007 anime Gurren Lagann. It is also referred to in Taishi Tsutsui's manga We Never Learn, at the end of Chapter 39.

Celebrated crime novelist Lawrence Block published The Burglar Who Met Fredric Brown in 2022.

== Personal life ==
In 1929, Brown married Helen Ruth Brown, a woman he had known only through a series of letters they had exchanged by mail. In 1930 the couple moved to Milwaukee, Wisconsin. They had two sons, James R. Brown of Culver City, California, and Linn L. Brown of Fremont, California.

His second wife was Elizabeth (née Charlier).

Brown was an ardent atheist, like his father was, and his mother was an agnostic. In 1965, he published a biographical piece titled "It's Only Everything", (Note: This is difficult to trace, but it is cited as appearing in the April 1965 issue of Goliard, which might refer to The Goliard Literary Magazine, a student-run literary magazine at the College of Wooster in Ohio.) in which he recalls being eight or nine years old and attending a Presbyterian church. He prayed for the life of a dying relative, but when she died in pain, he decided "that Christianity except for a part of its code of ethics was a mess of crap."

A lifelong smoker, Brown developed emphysema in his 50s, and he died of it at the age of sixty-five in 1972.

== Sources ==
- Seabrook, Jack (1993). Martians and Misplaced Clues: The Life and Work of Fredric Brown. Bowling Green University Popular Press. ISBN 978-0-87972-591-4.
