= 2035 in public domain =

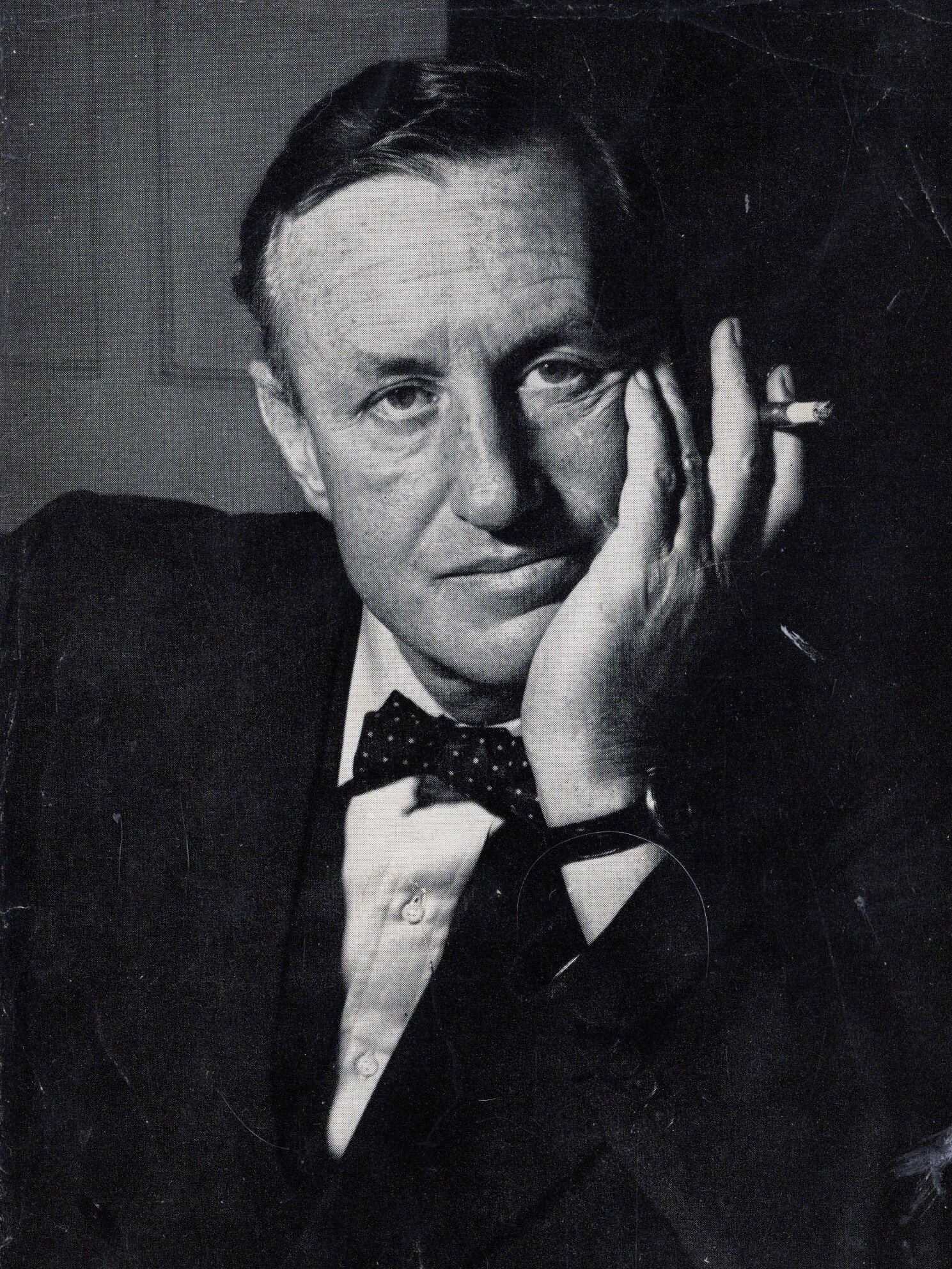
The literature of Ian Fleming, including the original James Bond series of novels and short stories, will enter the public domain in Europe in 2035.

When a work's copyright expires, it enters the public domain. Since laws vary globally, the copyright status of some works are not uniform. The following is a list of creators whose works enter the public domain in 2035 under the most common copyright regimes, assuming no further extensions to copyright terms become law in the interim.

== Countries with life + 70 years ==
Except for Belarus (Life + 50 years) and Spain (which has a copyright term of Life + 80 years for creators that died before 1988), a work enters the public domain in Europe 70 years after the creator's death, if it was published during the creator's lifetime. In addition, several other countries have a limit of 70 years. The list is sorted alphabetically and includes a notable work of the creator.

| Names | Country | Death | Occupation | Notable work |
|---|---|---|---|---|
| Dr. Atl | Mexico | 15 August 1964 | Painter, writer | |
| Fernando Leal | Mexico | 7 October 1964 | Painter, muralist, lithographer, engraver | |
| Bharathidasan | India | 21 April 1964 | Poet | "Tamil Thai Valthu" |
| Birinchi Kumar Barua | India | 30 March 1964 | Scholar, writer | |
| Carlos Brandt | Venezuela | 27 February 1964 | Writer | |
| Guru Dutt | India | 10 October 1964 | Film director | Pyaasa |
| Ian Fleming | United Kingdom | 12 August 1964 | Writer | James Bond |
| Mushtaq Hussain Khan | India | 13 August 1964 | Musician | |
| Jawaharlal Nehru | India | 27 May 1964 | Politician | An Autobiography |
| T. H. White | United Kingdom | 17 January 1964 | Author | The Once and Future King |

== Countries with life + 60 years ==
In Bangladesh, India, and Venezuela a work enters the public domain 60 years after the creator's death.

| Names | Country | Death | Occupation | Notable work |
|---|---|---|---|---|
| Jean Absil | Belgium | 2 February 1974 | Composer | |
| Gilbert Archey | New Zealand | 20 October 1974 | Zoologist | The Moa, a Study of the Dinornithiformes |
| Miguel Ángel Asturias | Guatemala | 9 June 1974 | Poet-diplomat | El Señor Presidente |
| Farid al-Atrash | Egypt | 26 December 1974 | Composer | |
| Kurt Atterberg | Sweden | 15 February 1974 | Composer | Compositions |
| H. E. Bates | United Kingdom | 29 January 1974 | Writer | The Darling Buds of May |
| Erick Berry | United States | February 1974 | Writer | The Winged Girl of Knossos |
| Bobby Bloom | United States | 28 February 1974 | Singer-songwriter | "Montego Bay" |
| Hector Bolitho | New Zealand | 12 September 1974 | Writer | Albert the Good and the Victorian Reign |
| Buddhadeb Bosu | Bangladesh | 1974 | Writer | |
| Rosario Castellanos | Mexico | 7 August 1974 | Poet, novelist | The Nine Guardians |
| Nellie Coad | New Zealand | 6 September 1974 | Teacher, writer | |
| Phillis Emily Cunnington | United Kingdom | 24 October 1974 | Physician, historian | Handbook of English Mediaeval Costume |
| Maurice Duggan | New Zealand | 11 December 1974 | Writer | Summer in the Gravel Pit |
| Duke Ellington | United States | 24 May 1974 | Composer | Duke Ellington discography |
| Julius Evola | Italy | 11 June 1974 | Philosopher | Revolt Against the Modern World |
| Allal al-Fassi | Morocco | 13 May 1974 | Writer | The Independence Movements in Arab North Africa |
| Dorothy Fields | United States | 28 March 1974 | Film lyricist | "The Way You Look Tonight" |
| Louise Fitzhugh | United States | 19 November 1974 | Writer | Harriet the Spy |
| Georgette Heyer | United Kingdom | 4 July 1974 | Writer | List of works by Georgette Heyer |
| Ali Ismael | Egypt | 16 June 1974 | Composer | Fida'i |
| Marie Luise Kaschnitz | Germany | 10 October 1974 | Writer | Menschen und Dinge 1945 |
| Erich Kästner | Germany | 29 July 1974 | Poet, screenwriter | Emil and the Detectives |
| Muhammad Ayub Khan | Pakistan | 19 April 1974 | Politician | Books |
| Whanki Kim | South Korea | 25 July 1974 | Painter | What Form, Shall We Meet Again? (어디서 무엇이 되어 다시 만나랴) |
| Pär Lagerkvist | Sweden | 11 July 1974 | Writer | Barabbas |
| Eve Langley | New Zealand | 1 June 1974 | Writer | The Pea-Pickers |
| Charles Lindbergh | United States | 26 August 1974 | Aviator, writer | "WE", The Spirit of St. Louis |
| Eric Linklater | United Kingdom | 7 November 1974 | Writer, poet | The Wind on the Moon |
| Walter Lippmann | United States | 14 December 1974 | Writer | Public Opinion |
| Margaret MacPherson | New Zealand | 14 September 1974 | Writer, journalist | A Symposium Against War |
| P. Schuyler Miller | United States | 13 October 1974 | Writer | |
| Henry de Monfreid | France | 13 December 1974 | Adventurer, writer | Secrets of the Red Sea |
| Stanley Mullen | United States | 1974 | Artist, writer | Kinsmen of the Dragon |
| Leslie Munro | New Zealand | 13 February 1974 | Politician, writer | United Nations: Hope for a Divided World |
| Douglas Robb | New Zealand | 1974 | Physician, writer | Medical Odyssey |
| David Alfaro Siqueiros | Mexico | 6 January 1974 | Painter, muralist | Portrait of the Bourgeoisie (1939–1940), The March of Humanity (1957–1971) |
| William Sloane | United States | 25 September 1974 | Writer | To Walk the Night |
| Zaharia Stancu | Romania | 5 December 1974 | Writer | Through the Ashes of the Empire |
| Sheila Stuart | United Kingdom | 1974 | Writer | Alison's Highland Holiday |
| Jacqueline Susann | United States | 21 September 1974 | Writer | Valley of the Dolls |
| Sándor Szathmári | Hungary | 16 July 1974 | Writer, mechanical engineer | Kazohinia |
| Bernard Wall (writer) | United Kingdom | 2 May 1974 | Writer, translator | English translation of The Phenomenon of Man |
| Robert Charles Zaehner | United Kingdom | 24 November 1974 | Scholar | Zurvan, Mysticism, Our Savage God |

== Countries with life + 50 years ==
In most countries of Africa and Asia, as well as Belarus, Bolivia, New Zealand, Egypt and Uruguay, a work enters the public domain 50 years after the creator's death.

| Names | Country | Death | Occupation | Notable work |
|---|---|---|---|---|
| Vicente Aleixandre | Spain | 14 December 1984 | Poet | |
| Julio Cortázar | Argentina; France | 12 February 1984 | Writer | Bibliography |
| Marvin Gaye | United States | 1 April 1984 | Singer-songwriter | Discography |
| Michail Sholokhov | Russia | 21 February 1984 | Novelist | And Quiet Flows the Don |
| François Truffaut | France | 21 October 1984 | Filmmaker | Filmography |

== Countries with life + 80 years ==
Spain has a copyright term of life + 80 years for creators that died before 1988. In Colombia and Equatorial Guinea, a work enters the public domain 80 years after the creator's death.

| Names | Country | Death | Occupation | Notable work |
|---|---|---|---|---|
| Jacinto Benavente | Spain | 14 July 1954 | Dramatist | The Unloved Woman |
| Tomás Carreras i Artau | Spain | 1954 | Philosopher, ethnologist | |
| Juan Chabás | Spain | 29 October 1954 | Writer, poet | Sueño Perseguido |
| María Goyri | Spain | 28 November 1954 | Hispanist, literary critic | |
| Santiago Martínez Delgado | Colombia | 12 January 1954 | Painter, sculptor, art historian, writer | Mural at the Capitolio Nacional |
| Matilde Muñoz Barberi | Spain | 12 December 1954 | Writer | El Amante Infinito |
| Eugenio d'Ors | Spain | 25 September 1954 | Writer | Manual del librero español e hispanoamericano |
| Antoni Palau i Dulcet | Spain | 1954 | Writer, journalist, philosopher, art critic | |

== United States ==
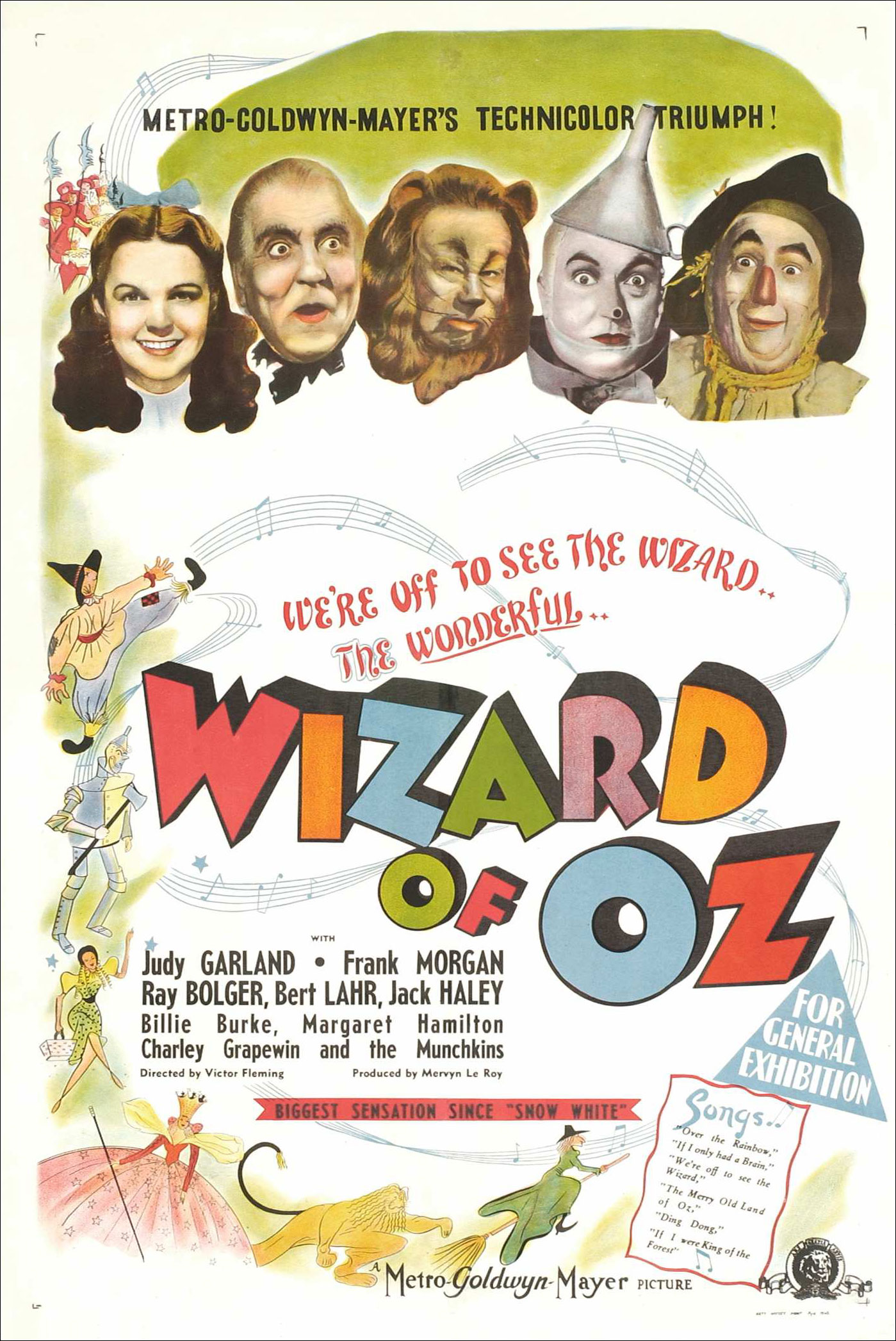
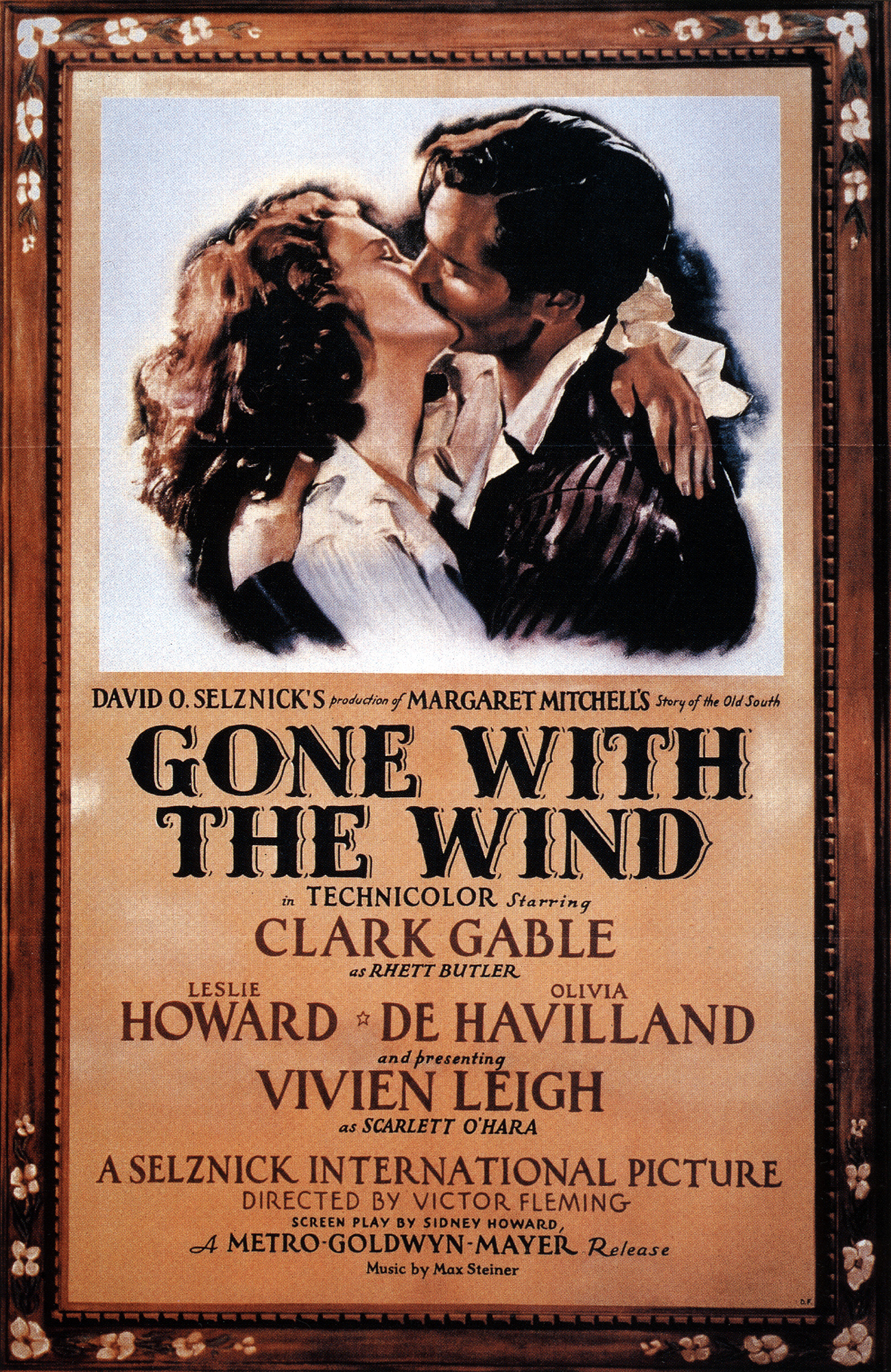
The two most famous films entering the public domain in the United States in 2035 are Victor Fleming's The Wizard of Oz and Gone with the Wind, both of which are widely considered to be among the greatest films of all time.

Under the Copyright Term Extension Act, books published in 1939, films released in 1939, and other works published in 1939 will enter the public domain in 2035. Sound recordings published in 1934 and unpublished works whose authors died in 1964 will also enter the public domain.

The most famous films entering the public domain in 2035 are two adaptations directed by Victor Fleming: MGM's The Wizard of Oz starring Judy Garland, and Selznick International's Best Picture Academy Award winner Gone with the Wind starring Clark Gable and Vivien Leigh, both of which have been celebrated for their innovative use of Technicolor and are widely considered to be among the greatest motion pictures of all time. The former film is the more significant entrant because of its widespread influence in popular culture; its entry will bring along the film's trademark designs and portrayals for L. Frank Baum's world and characters (Note: For example: the portrayal of main character Dorothy Gale as wearing a blue gingham dress, as well as the iconic ruby slippers.) as well as its entire incidental and song score, including its signature song "Over the Rainbow". (Note: The enhancements made to the film for its immersive 4D version, created in 2025 to screen at Sphere in the Las Vegas Valley, will remain copyrighted.) Also entering the public domain are multiple Hollywood films that are considered classics among their respective genres: Frank Capra's Mr. Smith Goes to Washington with Jean Arthur and James Stewart, Sam Wood's Goodbye, Mr. Chips with Robert Donat, John Ford's Stagecoach starring John Wayne, Dark Victory with Bette Davis and Humphrey Bogart, Ernst Lubitsch's Ninotchka starring Greta Garbo and Melvyn Douglas, Hal Roach's Of Mice and Men adaptation with Burgess Meredith, and William Wyler's adaptation of Wuthering Heights with Merle Oberon and Laurence Olivier.

Other notable films entering the public domain this year include Basil Rathbone's two Sherlock Holmes films for 20th Century Fox and his Universal Monsters film Son of Frankenstein co-starring Boris Karloff and Bela Lugosi, Alfred Hitchcock's thriller Jamaica Inn with Charles Laughton and Maureen O'Hara, Jean Renoir's The Rules of the Game, Jesse James starring Tyrone Power and Henry Fonda, Busby Berkeley's Babes in Arms starring Garland and Mickey Rooney, Dodge City starring Errol Flynn and Olivia de Havilland, George Cukor's The Women, Ford's Drums Along the Mohawk with Fonda and Claudette Colbert, Michael Curtiz's The Private Lives of Elizabeth and Essex, William Dieterle's adaptation of The Hunchback of Notre Dame with Charles Laughton, Condemned To Be Shot (one of the earliest television films), Hugh Harman's animated short film Peace on Earth, the final Betty Boop cartoons, and Walt Disney's last Silly Symphony short The Ugly Duckling. The first animated appearances of Mickey Mouse and Minnie Mouse in their modern character designs, including The Pointer, will also enter the public domain, along with the debut shorts of MGM's cartoon character Barney Bear and Walter Lantz's character Andy Panda.

Important literary works that will enter the public domain in 2035 include James Joyce's final work Finnegans Wake, John Steinbeck's novel The Grapes of Wrath, Agatha Christie's crime novel And Then There Were None, Raymond Chandler's The Big Sleep introducing Philip Marlowe, Richard Llewellyn's novel How Green Was My Valley, Stefan Zweig's novel Beware of Pity in its original German, Dr. Seuss's books The King's Stilts and The Seven Lady Godivas, Ernest Vincent Wright's novel Gadsby, Stanley G. Weinbaum's post-apocalyptic novel The Black Flame, the science fiction short stories I, Robot by Eando Binder and Marooned off Vesta by Isaac Asimov, Robert A. Heinlein's short story Life-Line, T. S. Eliot's poetry book Old Possum's Book of Practical Cats (the source material for Andrew Lloyd Webber's musical Cats), Joseph Kesselring's play Arsenic and Old Lace, C.S. Lewis and E. M. W. Tillyard's book of essays The Personal Heresy, Lindsay and Crouse's Life with Father, J. B. Priestley's novel Let the People Sing, Jorge Luis Borges' short story Pierre Menard, Author of the Quixote in its original Spanish, Hergé's Tintin story King Ottokar's Sceptre (including the first appearance of the opera singer Bianca Castafiore) in its original French black-and-white version, the first children's poems by Dutch author Annie M.G. Schmidt, and the children's books Cecily G. and the Nine Monkeys by H. A. Rey (which introduced the monkey character now known as Curious George) in its original French, The Twisted Claw and The Clue of the Tapping Heels from the Stratemeyer Syndicate's The Hardy Boys and Nancy Drew series in their original editions, and Madeline by Ludwig Bemelmans. The first comic books of DC Comics' Batman, (Note: When Batman enters the public domain, Commissioner Gordon will enter with him.) as well as the first comic books by Marvel Comics featuring the company's first and oldest superhero Namor and the original character of the Human Torch (not to be confused with Johnny Storm, a member of the Fantastic Four who were introduced much later), will also become public domain in 2035. The same will happen for the Disney comic strips introducing Mickey's recurring enemy, The Phantom Blot; for the booklet from the Montgomery Ward department store chain that introduced the character of Rudolph the Red-Nosed Reindeer, who would later become the focus of a popular Christmas song; for the premiere issues of The Kenyon Review, Startling Stories, Poetry London, and Famous Fantastic Mysteries; and for the first album of the Franco-Belgian comic characters Blondin and Cirage.

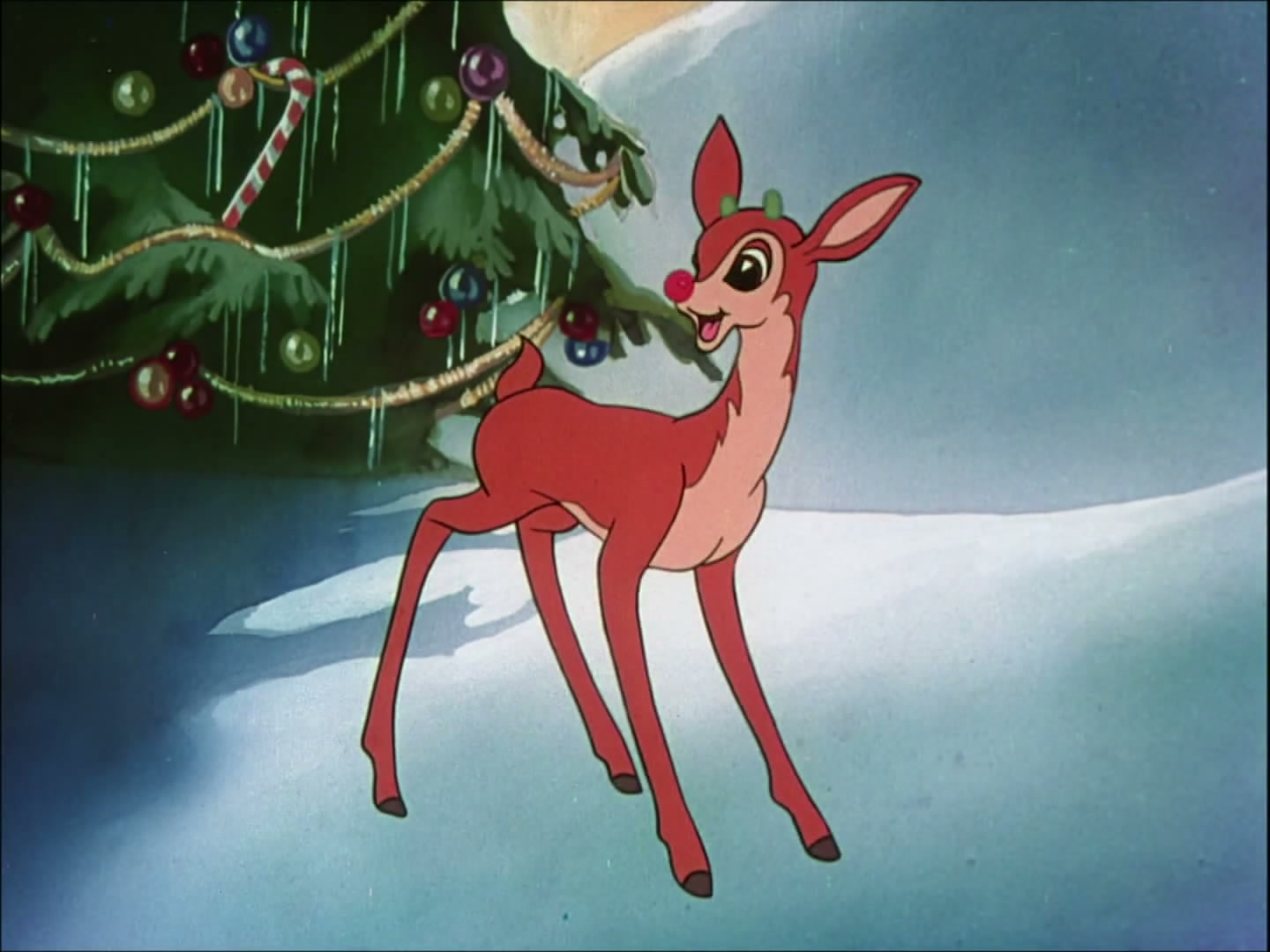
The Christmas character Rudolph the Red-Nosed Reindeer (shown here in Fleischer Studios' non-renewed animated version) will enter the public domain in the United States in 2035.

Works from 1939 that were already in the public domain for lacking proper copyright renewal or bearing invalid notices include Leo McCarey's Love Affair with Irene Dunne, Dave Fleischer's animated feature film Gulliver's Travels, various Merrie Melodies cartoons including Prest-O Change-O with the second prototype appearance of Bugs Bunny, the first comics of DC's pulp hero Sandman, and various comics by Fox Feature Syndicate including those debuting the original incarnation of Blue Beetle (who would much later become a DC character himself), Stardust the Super Wizard from Fantastic Comics, The Flame, and the Golden Age Wonder Man. It should also be noted that in addition to Marvel's first comics, Namor also appeared in another company's comic called Motion Picture Funnies Weekly from the same year, which was not renewed; if that book was published first, that would make the character already public domain.

Artworks entering the public domain include Salvador Dalí's The Enigma of Hitler, Edward Hopper's Cape Cod Evening, Frida Kahlo's oil painting The Two Fridas, and Fernand Leger's Adam and Eve.

Popular songs entering the public domain include "Moonlight Serenade", "God Bless America", "We'll Meet Again", "If I Didn't Care", "What's New?", and the nursery song "I'm A Little Teapot". Sergei Prokofiev's Alexander Nevsky will also become public domain in the United States this year, alongside the original composition of Solomon Linda's "Mbube", which would later be evolved into “The Lion Sleeps Tonight”.

== See also ==
- List of American films of 1939
- 1939 in literature
- 1939 in music
- 1964 in literature and 1984 in literature for deaths of writers
- Public Domain Day
- Creative Commons
