= Lilith (novel) =

1895 novel by George MacDonald

Lilith: A Romance
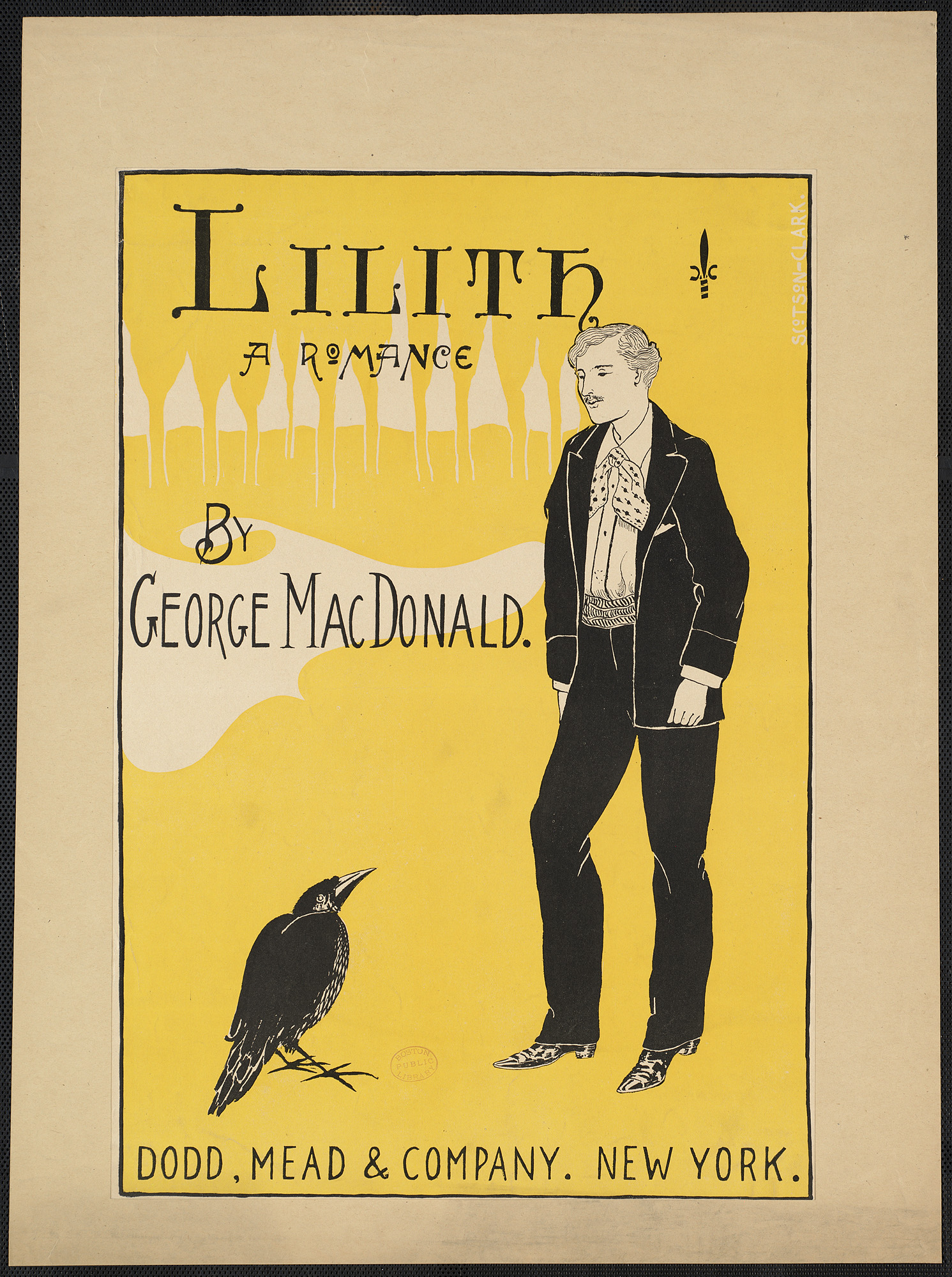
- Poster for the U.S. first edition (1895)
- Author: George MacDonald
- Language: English
- Genre: Fantasy
- Publisher: Chatto and Windus
- Publication date: 1895
- Publication place: United Kingdom
- Media type: Print (Hardback & Paperback)
- Pages: 351

Lilith: A Romance is a fantasy novel by Scottish writer George MacDonald, first published in 1895. It was reprinted in paperback by Ballantine Books as the fifth volume of the Ballantine Adult Fantasy series in September 1969.

Lilith: A Romance is considered among the darkest of MacDonald's works, and among the most profound. It is a story concerning the nature of life, death, and salvation. In the story, MacDonald mentions a cosmic sleep that heals tortured souls, preceding the salvation of all. MacDonald was a Christian universalist, believing that all will eventually be saved. However, in this story, divine punishment is not taken lightly, and salvation is hard-won.

== Plot summary ==
Mr. Vane, the protagonist of Lilith, owns a library that seems to be haunted by the former librarian, who looks much like a raven from the brief glimpses he catches of the wraith. After finally encountering the supposed ghost, the mysterious Mr. Raven, Vane learns that Raven had known his father; indeed, Vane's father had visited the strange parallel universe from which Raven comes and goes and now resides therein. Vane follows Raven into the world through a mirror (this symbolistic realm is described as "the region of the seven dimensions", a term taken from Jacob Boehme).

Inside the world, Vane learns of a house of beds where the dreamers sleep until the end of the world in death: a good death, in which life is found. Vane's grandfather refused to sleep there and is, instead, forced to do battle with skeletons in a haunted wood. After a treacherous journey through a valley (where the moon is the only thing to keep him safe), Mr. Vane meets the Little Ones, children who never grow up, remaining pure children or becoming selfish and getting bigger and dumber, turning into "bags" or bad giants. After conversing with Lona, the eldest of the children, Mr. Vane decides to help them, and sets off to gather more information, although the Raven has warned Mr. Vane that he needs to sleep along with the dreamers before he can really help them. Mr. Vane learns that the Raven is also Adam and his wife is Eve.

While on his journey, he meets Lilith, Adam's first wife and the princess of Bulika. Vane, although nearly blinded by Lilith's beauty and charms, eventually leads the Little Ones in a battle against Bulika. Lona, Vane's love, turns out to be Lilith's daughter, and is killed by her own mother. Lilith, however, is captured and brought to Adam and Eve at the house of death, where they struggle to make her open her hand, fused shut, in which she holds the water the Little Ones need to grow. Only when she gives it up can Lilith join the sleepers in blissful dreams, free of sin. After a long struggle, Lilith bids Adam cut her hand from her body; it is done, Lilith sleeps, and Vane is sent to bury the hand; water flows from the hole and washes the land over. Vane is then allowed to join the Little Ones, already asleep, in their dreaming. He takes his bed, next to Lona's, and finds true life in death.

Mr. Vane awakens in his home, then is afterwards unsure that he is really awake, but actually dreaming that he is awake. He does not attempt to re-enter the parallel world but waits "all the days of (his) appointed time ...till (his) change come".

== Critical reception ==
James Blish ranked Lilith as "one of the great originals," saying that its "allegory is far from obtrusive, and the story proper both tense and decidedly eerie." E. F. Bleiler described it as "a long parabolic narrative heavily laden with Victorian Christian symbolism" and noted that critical opinion of the novel was sharply divided: "Some critics regard it highly for its fine images and verbal flashes", while others regard it as a most unpleasant work with an unpalatable message." Neil Barron argued that Lilith "has parallels with Phantastes (1858) and shows the slight influence of Carroll, but it is easily the strangest product of Victorian fantasy. It is the obvious parent of Lindsay's Voyage to Arcturus (1920) and fascinated C. S. Lewis; as an allegory of heterodox Christianity it bears an interesting relation to the works of T. F. Powys."

== Sources ==
- Bleiler, Everett (1948). The Checklist of Fantastic Literature. Chicago: Shasta Publishers.
- Brown, Charles N.; William G. Contento. "The Locus Index to Science Fiction (1984-1998)".
- Brown, Charles N.; William G. Contento. "The Locus Index to Science Fiction (2002)".
- Carter, Lin (1973). Imaginary Worlds. New York: Ballantine Books. ISBN 0-345-03309-4.
- MacDonald, George. Lilith. Grand Rapids, Michigan: Eerdmans Publishing Company, 2000.
- Tuck, Donald H. (1978). The Encyclopedia of Science Fiction and Fantasy. Chicago: Advent. ISBN 0-911682-22-8.
