= Shasta Publishers =

Defunct American specialty small press

Shasta Publishers was a science fiction and fantasy small press specialty publishing house founded in 1947 by Erle Melvin Korshak, T. E. Dikty, and Mark Reinsberg, who were all science fiction fans from the Chicago area. The name of the press was suggested by Reinsberg in remembrance of a summer job that he and Korshak had held at Mount Shasta.

== History ==
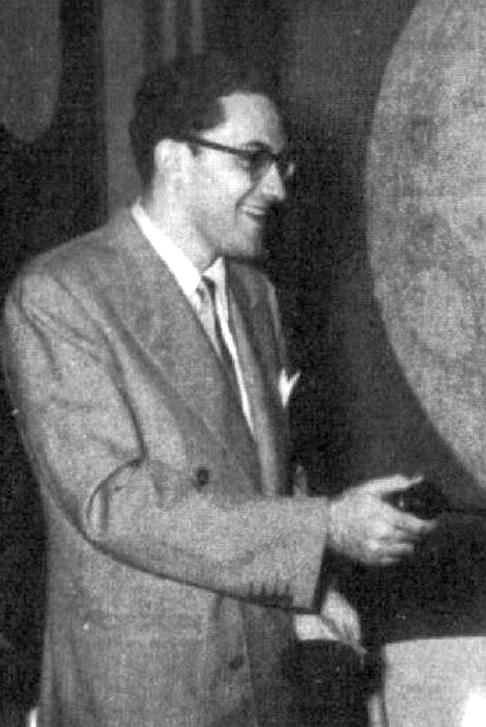
Mel Korshak

As science fiction fans and book collectors, Mel Korshak, Mark Reinsberg, Ted Dikty, and Fred Shroyer recognized the need for a comprehensive list of science fiction and fantasy published up to that time. In 1940 they made plans to compile such a list and began writing letters to the readers' letter columns in the science fiction and fantasy pulp magazines, asking for help with the project; a card file was started, as was a manuscript. Unfortunately, these materials were put into storage when Dikty was drafted for service in World War II. After the war, the file and manuscript were unable to be located, and the work would have to begin again from scratch.

Korshak and Dikty began a book selling business in 1946, while still eager to publish the earlier attempted list. Korshak soon after met Everett F. Bleiler through a newspaper ad offering books for sale. Bleiler expressed interest in their project, and he eventually took it over; the result was The Checklist of Fantastic Literature, which was finally published under the Shasta imprint in 1948. Originally planning to primarily publish reference books on science fiction and fantasy, the new specialty press instead went on to publish fiction by John W. Campbell, Jr., L. Ron Hubbard, Robert A. Heinlein, A. E. van Vogt, and others. Ultimately, however, they were not successful and finally ceased publishing in 1957, having produced 19 volumes under the Shasta imprint.

According to Robert Weinberg, "Using an involved, multicolor printing process, Shasta featured some of the finest color jackets ever done in the small press field. Some of these were the jackets for The Wheels of If by L. Sprague de Camp, Slaves of Sleep by L. Ron Hubbard and Kinsmen of the Dragon by Stanley Mullen, with the art for all three by Hannes Bok.

== Works published by Shasta ==
- The Checklist of Fantastic Literature, by Everett F. Bleiler (1948)
- Who Goes There?, by John W. Campbell, Jr. (1948)
- Slaves of Sleep, by L. Ron Hubbard (1948)
- The Wheels of If, by L. Sprague de Camp (1949)
- The World Below, by S. Fowler Wright (1949)
- The Man Who Sold the Moon, by Robert A. Heinlein (1950)
- Sidewise in Time, by Murray Leinster (1950)
- Kinsmen of the Dragon, by Stanley Mullen (1951)
- Space on My Hands, by Fredric Brown (1951)
- The Green Hills of Earth, by Robert A. Heinlein (1951)
- Cloak of Aesir, by John W. Campbell, Jr. (1952) (short fiction collection)
- This Island Earth, by Raymond F. Jones (1952)
- Murder in Millennium VI, by Curme Gray (1952)
- The Demolished Man, by Alfred Bester (1953)
- Space Platform, by Murray Leinster (1953)
- Revolt in 2100, by Robert A. Heinlein (1953)
- Science Fiction Carnival, edited by Fredric Brown and Mack Reynolds (1953)
- Space Tug, by Murray Leinster (1953)
- Empire of the Atom, by A. E. van Vogt (1956)
