= The Contraband Cow =

- Short story by L. Sprague de Camp
- W. A. Kolliker's illustration of the story in Astounding Science Fiction
- Country: United States
- Language: English
- Genre: Science fiction

Publication
- Published in: Astounding Science Fiction
- Publisher: Street & Smith Publications, Inc.
- Media type: Print (Magazine)
- Publication date: July 1942

"The Contraband Cow" is a classic science fiction story by L. Sprague de Camp. It was first published in the magazine Astounding Science Fiction for July 1942. It first appeared in book form in the hardcover collection The Wheels of If and Other Science Fiction (Shasta, 1948); the collection was reprinted in paperback by Berkley Books in 1970. The story has been translated into German.

== Plot summary ==
Biochemist Homer Osborn of the San Antonio branch of the Federal Research Laboratories has been working on a formula for synthetic beef. While not as good as actual beef, it may prove lucrative for his employer, as beef consumption has been prohibited by the Assembly of the Federation of Democratic and Libertarian States, which includes both the U.S. and India. As representation in the assembly is by population, the cow protectionist Indian majority forced through an anti-vaccacide law and made it mandatory on all member states.

The law prohibits "the eating of cattle, which term shall include all animals of the subfamily Bovinae of the family Bovidae, the same comprising kine, buffaloes, bison, zebus, gayals, bantengs, yaks, and species closely related thereto, or any parts of members thereof," as well as "the killing, for any purpose whatever, and the assault, molestation, capture, imprisonment, sale, purchase, possession, transportation, importation into or exportation out of the Federation of Democratic and Libertarian States, or any territory subject to the jurisdiction thereof, for purpose of eating, of cattle." There has been much resistance to this new version of prohibition in the U.S., and "steaklegging," controlled by Mexican cattle kings, is rampant.

Osborn's department head Charles Kenny decides to treat him to the real thing for comparative purposes, so under the pretense of fishing, the two row out into the wetlands along the lower Nueces River with a package of contraband steaks, weighted for quick disposal. After they set up their campfire Osborn starts cooking the meat while Kenny goes for firewood. While the latter is away, the law arrives in the form of Guja Singh, a towering Sikh of the Fodals or Border Patrol, who arrests Osborn and escorts him toward his patrol car. Guja is the son of prominent Indian politician Arjan Singh.

The bust is in turn busted, however, when both captor and captive are ambushed and abducted by cattle-runners. Osborn soon realizes these are no local steakleggers, but agents of one of the Big Three Mexican cattle kings who control much of the illicit beef traffic into the U.S. Sure enough, Osborn and Singh are taken to the secret compound of Harmodio Dualler, one of the three, in Mexico's Bolsóm de Mapimí. There they meet the "critter king," who sees in Osborn's work potential competition. Dismissing protestations that the labs' synthetic protein cannot possibly compete with real beef, Dualler demands of him all his samples, notes and writings, on pain of death. The Sikh he is initially unsure what to do with, deeming it dangerous to either kill, keep or release him.

The prisoners are incarcerated until nightfall, when they are brought out to eat with their captors. As the meal consists of steak, Guja protests it is against his beliefs to eat it, until assured it is some of Osborn's synthetic beef. Osborn, however, realizes it's too good to be synthetic, and after they eat lets Guja know the steakleggers have fooled him. Guja tries to fight but quickly despairs and gives up, convinced he is ruined. Dualler informs him it's a ploy to ensure he won't make trouble after his release; the meal has been filmed for purposes of blackmail.

Later, back in their cells, Guja passes Osborn a pistol he had concealed in his turban, which the steakleggers didn't think to search. Having heard their captors plotting to kill Osborn after obtaining his secrets, lest he later replicate his work, the Sikh feels one of them should have a chance. For his own part, he attempts to hang himself, but is caught and prevented.

The next day Osborn is taken to Dualler's communication room, where the latter has him make a television call to Charley Kenny's office to have his work delivered to the cartel. But once the connection is made, Osborn presses Guja's pistol into his captor's ribs and orders the Sikh brought in. He apprises Kenny of the situation and directs him to switch the call to Arjan Singh in Delhi. Once Guja is present, Osborn ascertains from him the number of votes his father controls in the Assembly, and confirms it is enough to secure the repeal of the anti-vaccacide law currently before that body. Then he forces Dualler to demand Arjan Singh swing the debate in return for Guja's life. Conscious of their family honor, neither Arjan nor Guja buckles to the threat—until the blackmail film is brought up. Arjan breaks down and agrees.

Realizing his enterprise is doomed if the anti-vaccacide law is repealed, Dualler suddenly grapples with Osborn, who, unable to shoot, flips his pistol to Guja. Guja dispatches Dualler and the two prisoners start a fire in the communications room, after which they burst out, proclaiming the communications apparatus has exploded and injured the critter king. In the ensuing confusion Osborn and Guja sneak from the compound, steal a truck, and make their escape.

Later they arrive at the labs in San Antonio, where Kenny informs them the repeal act has passed. The bewildered Guja Singh finds himself a hero due to his father's pivotal role in the vote, while Osborn, now that there is no need for his synthetic beef, prepares to shake the dust of San Antonio from his feet and return to his native Brooklyn.

== Reception ==
August Derleth characterized the story as "fast-action, slangy, whacky."

P. Schuyler Miller noted that "The Contraband Cow" "offers thoughts on the possible consequences of a world government in which lobbying has not been eliminated as the principal directive of legislation."

John K. Aiken criticized the tale as "definitely thin," "a flippant treatment" of "the undermining of a despotic sway" that "in its original magazine matrix sparkled with a lustre of humour and humanity which, it now appears, derived a good deal from the contrast with its surroundings." Without this setting he found it "too superficial to be really entertaining," feeling that "[i]n the shorter length, there is no time for Mr. de Camp to block in his detail enough to make creditable his rather irresponsible ideas."

Loay H. Hall notes that "[d]espite de Camp's tongue-in-cheek claim in the foreword to The Wheels of If (Shasta, 1948) that he does not write satire, there is little doubt that ... "The Contraband Cow" [is] intended to be satire."

Earl Terry Kemp summed it up as "future irony," finding it "humorous on the whole, ... with excellent ideas." He praised de Camp as having "a freshness of approach and an irrepressible sense of humor—ranging from subtle humorous overtones to broad slapstick burlesque—which enliven his stories, and he has rightfully been regarded as a master in blending fantastic themes with rib-tickling situations."
