= Man of Two Worlds =

Man of Two Worlds may refer to:

- Man of Two Worlds (novel), a novel by Brian and Frank Herbert
- Man of Two Worlds (film), a 1934 American pre-Code drama film
- "Man of Two Worlds", a song by Ultravox from the album Lament
- Renaissance (novel), a novel by Raymond F. Jones, also known as Man of Two Worlds
- I'll Never Forget You (film), a 1951 film, also known as Man of Two Worlds
