= Toymaker (disambiguation) =

A toymaker is a person or company that designs, produces, or manufactures toys.

Toymaker may also refer to:

- The Toymaker (Doctor Who), a fictional extraterrestrial in Doctor Who
- Toymaker (The Batman), a fictional C.E.O. in The Batman

== See also ==
- The Toymaker
