= Space on My Hands =

1951 short story collection by Fredric Brown

- Dust-jacket from the first edition
- Author: Fredric Brown
- Cover artist: Malcolm Smith
- Language: English
- Genre: Science fiction
- Publisher: Shasta Publishers
- Publication date: 1951
- Publication place: United States
- Media type: Print (hardback)
- Pages: 224
- OCLC: 1613135

Space on My Hands is a 1951 collection of science fiction short stories by American writer Fredric Brown. It was first published by Shasta Publishers in 1951 in an edition of 5,000 copies. The story "Something Green" is original to this collection. The other stories originally appeared in the magazines Ellery Queen's Mystery Magazine, Thrilling Wonder Stories, Captain Future, Planet Stories and Weird Tales.

== Contents ==
- Introduction
- "Something Green"
- "Crisis"
- "Pi in the Sky"
- "Knock"
- "All Good Bems"
- "Daymare"
- "Nothing Sirius"
- "The Star Mouse"
- "Come and Go Mad"

== Reception ==
P. Schuyler Miller reported the collection to be "a selection of nine top-notch stories."

== Sources ==
- Chalker, Jack L.; Mark Owings (1998). The Science-Fantasy Publishers: A Bibliographic History, 1923-1998. Westminster, MD and Baltimore: Mirage Press, Ltd. p. 593.
- Contento, William G. "Index to Science Fiction Anthologies and Collections".
- Tuck, Donald H. (1974). The Encyclopedia of Science Fiction and Fantasy. Chicago: Advent. p. 69. ISBN 0-911682-20-1.
