= Murder in Millennium VI =

1951 novel by Curme Gray

- Dust-jacket from the first edition
- Author: Curme Gray
- Cover artist: Robert Johnson
- Language: English
- Genre: Science fiction novel
- Publisher: Shasta Publishers
- Publication date: 1951
- Publication place: United States
- Media type: Print (hardback)
- Pages: 249 pp
- OCLC: 1894929

Murder in Millennium VI is a science fiction novel by author Curme Gray. It was published in 1951 by Shasta Publishers in an edition of 2,500 copies, and included in a Mystery Guild omnibus edition. The novel was the subject of an extensive analysis in Damon Knight's In Search of Wonder (1956). Paul Di Filippo favorably describes it as "utter futuristic strangeness unleavened by infodumps." Less sympathetically, Groff Conklin, reviewing the novel on its release, declared that "The style is opaque, the characters wooden. posturing empty, and unreal." P. Schuyler Miller reported that although the novel violated most of the standard conventions of the mystery story, and is "unfair to organized readers" who expect that all the information needed to resolve the mystery is presented in the story, the novel still creates "a growing fascination in the situation as it unravels -- or rather entangles itself -- which is rather effective."

== Plot introduction ==
Set 6,000 years in the future, the novel concerns the murder of the head of a matriarchal society. Victor Mitchel and his parents and sister struggle to replace her and find the killer before the society collapses. The novel is unique in that anything which would have been known to the people of its time was not explained.
