= Science Fiction Carnival =

- Dust-jacket from the first edition.
- Editors: Fredric Brown and Mack Reynolds
- Cover artist: Adri Ames
- Language: English
- Genre: Science fiction
- Publisher: Shasta Publishers
- Publication date: 1953
- Publication place: United States
- Media type: Print (hardback)
- Pages: 315
- OCLC: 1613005

Science Fiction Carnival is an anthology of humorous science fiction stories edited by American writers Fredric Brown and Mack Reynolds. It was published by Shasta Publishers in 1953 in an edition of 3,500 copies. Most of the stories originally appeared in the magazines Super Science Stories, Fantasy and Science Fiction, Astounding, Worlds Beyond, Slant, Imagination, Space Science Fiction, Thrilling Wonder Stories and Blue Book.

== Contents ==
- Introduction, by Fredric Brown
- Preface, by Mack Reynolds
- "The Wheel of Time", by Robert Arthur
- "SRL Ad", by Richard Matheson
- "A Logic Named Joe", by Murray Leinster
- "Simworthy’s Circus", by Larry Shaw
- "The Well-Oiled Machine", by H. B. Fyfe
- "Venus and the Seven Sexes", by William Tenn
- "The Swordsmen of Varnis", by Clive Jackson
- "Paradox Lost", by Fredric Brown
- "Muten", by Eric Frank Russell
- "The Martians and the Coys", by Mack Reynolds
- "The Ego Machine", by Henry Kuttner
- "The Cosmic Jackpot", by George O. Smith
- "The Abduction of Abner Greer", by Nelson S. Bond

== Reception ==
P. Schuyler Miller gave the anthology a mediocre review, saying "The only trouble with [the book] is that someone else got to all the best stories first."

== Sources ==
- Brown, Charles N.; William G. Contento. "The Locus Index to Science Fiction (2001)".
- Chalker, Jack L.; Mark Owings (2001). The Science-Fantasy Publishers: A Bibliographic History, Supplement 9, 2000–2001. Westminster, MD and Baltimore: Mirage Press, Ltd. p. 594.
