= Slaves of Sleep =

1948 science fantasy novel by L. Ron Hubbard

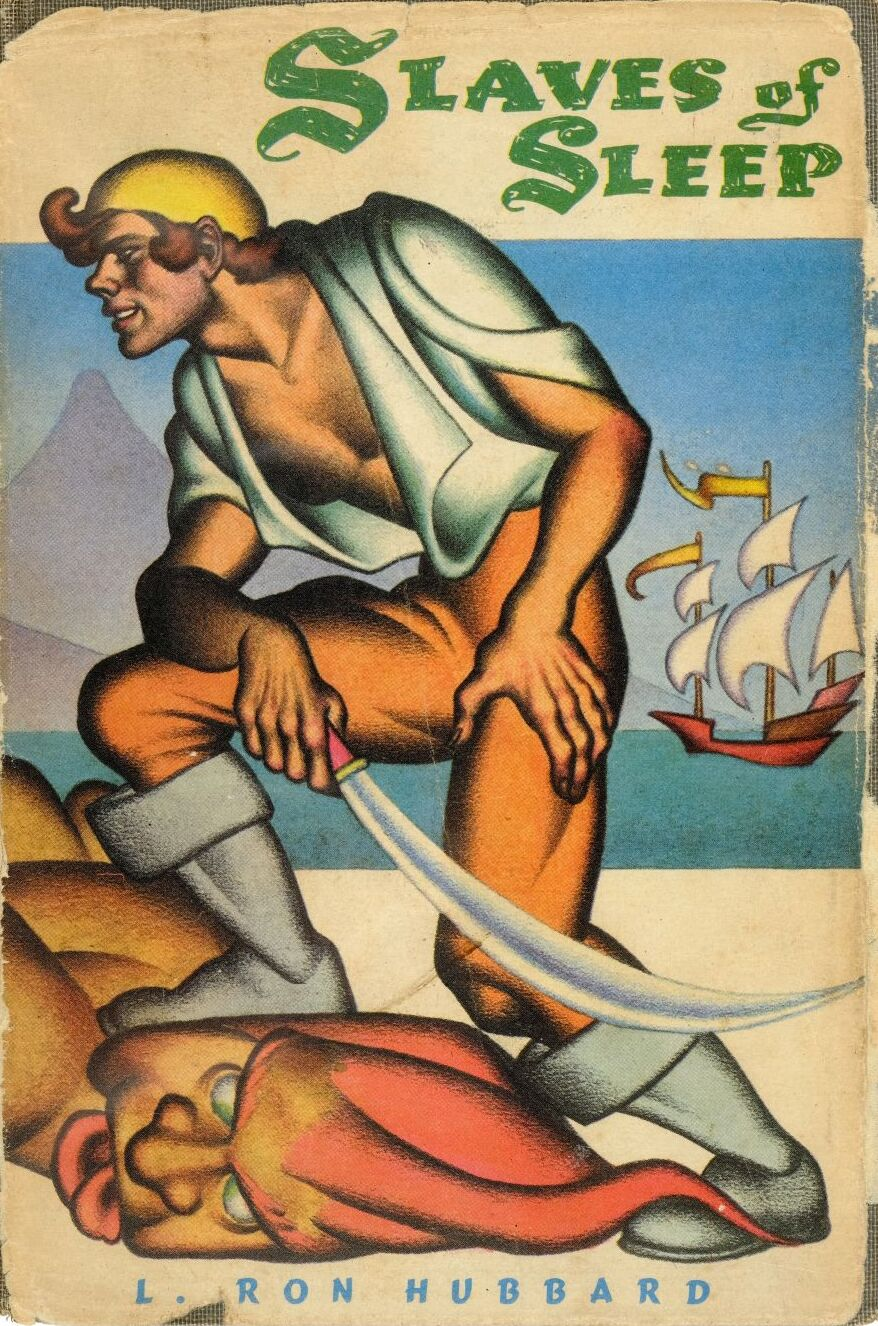
- Cover from 1948 publication
- Author: L. Ron Hubbard
- Cover artist: H. W. Scott
- Language: English
- Genre: Science fantasy
- Publisher: Street & Smith Publications, Inc.
- Publication date: 1948
- Publication place: United States
- Media type: Print
- Pages: 206
- Followed by: The Masters of Sleep

Slaves of Sleep is a science fantasy novel by American writer L. Ron Hubbard. It was first published in book form in 1948 by Shasta Publishers; the novel originally appeared in a July 1939 issue of pulp fantasy fiction magazine Unknown. The novel presents a story in which a man travels to a parallel universe ruled by Ifrits. The protagonist takes on the identity of a human in this dimension, and becomes involved in the politics of Ifrits in this fictional "Arabian Nights" world.

== Plot introduction ==
The novel concerns Jan Palmer, a young millionaire, who surprises a prowler who is attempting to burgle his collection of antiques. The prowler opens a jar that bears the seal of Sulayman releasing an Ifrit, named Zongri, that was imprisoned. The Ifrit kills the thief and curses Palmer with eternal wakefulness. At night, Palmer assumes the identity of an adventurer in another dimension where the Ifrits rule the humans under the Ifrit queen where he becomes embroiled in the conflict between Zongri and the Ifrit queen.

== Publication history ==
The story later published in book format, was first released in July 1939 in the United States, in the magazine Unknown. Its first book publication was in 1948 in the U.S. by Shasta Publishers in a hardback format. The first edition of the book contained a publication of 3,500 copies, of which 250 were signed by Hubbard. It was published in Germany in 1963 in hardback format by Utopia-Kriminal. It was re-published in the U.S. in a paperback format in 1967, by Lancer Books.

Actor René Auberjonois performed audio reading for the 1993 adaptation of the book in spoken format, as a dual release with its sequel, titled together: Slaves of Sleep & the Masters of Sleep. In 1993 actors Michelle Stafford, Sisu Raiken, Jim Meskimen, Christopher Smith and Tait Ruppert performed segments from the book with Interplay, their improv comedy organization. The 1993 edition by Bridge Publications was part of re-released fictional works by L. Ron Hubbard.

== Reception ==
Reviewing the Shasta edition, L. Sprague de Camp concluded that the novel was "a rattling good adventure story," its technical flaws outweighed by "the express-train speed of the action [and] the bounce, zest, and exuberant humor."

In its entry on L. Ron Hubbard, The Houghton Mifflin Dictionary of Biography identified Slaves of Sleep as among the "classics" within the genre of science fiction. In a 1986 article in The Washington Post, journalist Janrae Frank commented on L. Ron Hubbard's writings, "Much of his best work of the '40s and '50s, Fear, Slaves of Sleep, Typewriter in the Sky, is written in exactly the same style and won reader polls at the time." Writing in authors Frank M. Robinson and Lawrence Davidson placed Slaves of Sleep among Hubbard's "finest novels". The book Icons of Horror and the Supernatural noted, "L. Ron Hubbard had great success with a heroic fantasy novel set in the world of the Arabian Nights, Slaves of Sleep, when it appeared in John W. Campbell's 'sophisticated' fantasy magazine Unknown". In a 1993 article, The Columbus Dispatch recommended an edition of the book bound together with its sequel The Masters of Sleep, as a suggested holiday gift.

In 1994, Roland J. Green of the Chicago Sun-Times noted, "L. Ron Hubbard's Slaves of Sleep/Masters of Sleep (Bridge, $18.95) reprints two short novels on the borderline between fantasy and horror. A further reminder of the late Hubbard's talent." San Francisco Chronicle reported in 2003 that writer John Baxter retained a first edition copy of Slaves of Sleep in his private collection of rare books. In 2008, a first edition copy of the book was estimated to be worth between US$400 to $600.
