= Divided We Fall (novella) =

1950 novella by Raymond F. Jones

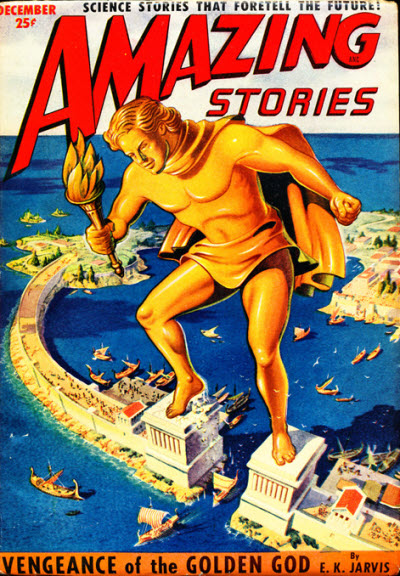
"...Divided We Fall" was originally published in the December 1950 issue of Amazing Stories

"...Divided We Fall" is a science fiction novella by American writer Raymond F. Jones, originally published in Amazing Stories in 1950. It was rewritten as a novel called Syn.

== Plot summary ==
The story involves a man's return to Earth after a multi-year contract job on another planet. The Earth he comes back to, however, has undergone a devastating social upheaval. Apparently, a new race of "Synthetic Humans", or "Syns" has been created and is now intent on taking over the world. Meanwhile, the real humans are trying to destroy them. The problem is, the only way to identify a "Syn" is by a highly sensitive ECG's reading of a particular brainwave pattern, and the Syns are said to have the ability to fool the test much of the time, so they can "pass" many such tests before being detected. When they are detected, they are arrested and sent to be exterminated.

In charge is a supercomputer that only the protagonist truly understands. After much adventure and tragedy, he realizes what has truly happened to humanity and his planet, as well as the computer's role. He resolves to prove his theory and save the world, or die trying.

== Adaptation ==
Jones's story was adapted into an episode of the UK TV series Out of This World, with a teleplay by Leon Griffiths and a cast including Ronald Radd, Bernard Horsfall, Ann Bell and Clive Morton. The episode aired August 25, 1962.
