= This Island Earth =

1955 film by Jack Arnold and Joseph M. Newman

- Theatrical release poster by Reynold Brown
- Directed by: Joseph Newman; Jack Arnold (uncredited)
- Written by: Franklin Coen; Edward G. O'Callaghan
- Based on: This Island Earth; 1952 novel by Raymond F. Jones
- Produced by: William Alland
- Starring: Jeff Morrow; Faith Domergue; Rex Reason
- Cinematography: Clifford Stine
- Edited by: Virgil Vogel
- Music by: Joseph Gershenson (supervised); Henry Mancini (uncredited); Hans J. Salter (uncredited); Herman Stein (uncredited)
- Production company: Universal-International
- Distributed by: Universal-International
- Release date: June 10, 1955 (New York City)
- Running time: 86 minutes
- Country: United States
- Language: English
- Budget: $800,000 (estimated)

This Island Earth is a 1955 American science fiction film produced by William Alland, directed by Joseph M. Newman and Jack Arnold, and starring Jeff Morrow, Faith Domergue, and Rex Reason. It is based on the 1952 novel of the same name by Raymond F. Jones. The film, distributed by Universal-International, was released in 1955 on a double feature with Abbott and Costello Meet the Mummy.

Upon initial release, the film was praised by critics, who cited the special effects, well-written script, and the eye-popping Technicolor as being its major assets. In 1996, it was edited down and lampooned in Mystery Science Theater 3000: The Movie, a film adaptation of the popular film-riffing television series Mystery Science Theater 3000.

The 1952 novel by Jones was originally serialized in the science fiction magazine Thrilling Wonder Stories as three related novelettes: "The Alien Machine" (June 1949), "The Shroud of Secrecy" (December 1949), and "The Greater Conflict" (February 1950). Jones had taken the novel title from a line in Robert Graves' poem "Darien":

It is a poet's privilege and fate
To fall enamoured of the one Muse
Who variously haunts this island earth

== Plot summary ==
Physicist and leading atomic scientist Dr. Cal Meacham is flying to his laboratory in a loaned Lockheed T-33 Shooting Star. Just before landing, the jet's engine fails, but he is saved from crashing by a mysterious green glow that surrounds his aircraft.

Back at his laboratory, Meacham discovers that an unusual substitute for the electronic condensers that he had ordered has been delivered from a mysterious source. Intrigued that the condensers appear to be made from an unknown and almost indestructible material, he later orders instructions and parts to build a complex device called an "interocitor". Neither Meacham nor his assistant, Joe Wilson, have heard of such a device, but they immediately begin its construction. When they finish, a mysterious man named Exeter appears on the interocitor's screen and informs Meacham that he has passed a test. His ability to build the interocitor demonstrates that he is gifted enough to be part of Exeter's special research project. As Exeter is demonstrating the interociter's destructive power, Meacham yanks out its power cord and the machine self-destructs.

Despite his reservations, Meacham remains intrigued and is picked up at the fog-shrouded airport by an unmanned, computer-controlled Douglas DC-3 aircraft with no windows. Landing in a remote area of Georgia, he finds an international group of top atomic scientists already present, including an old flame, Dr. Ruth Adams. Cal is confused by Ruth's failure to recognize him and becomes suspicious of Exeter and his assistant Brack. Believing that they are not being monitored, Adams and a third scientist, Steve Carlson, share their suspicions with Meacham.

Meacham and Adams flee with Carlson, but their car is attacked and Carlson is killed. When they take off in a Stinson 108 single-engine aircraft, Meacham and Adams watch as the research facility and all its inhabitants are incinerated. Their aircraft is then drawn up by a bright green beam into a flying saucer. Exeter explains that he and his men are from the planet Metaluna and are locked in a war with the Zagons. They defend against Zagon attacks with a planetary energy field, but are running out of uranium to keep it operational. They have enlisted humans in an effort to transmute lead into uranium, but time has now run out. Exeter takes both Earthers back to his world, sealing them in conditioning tubes to normalize the pressure differences between the planets.

They land safely on Metaluna, but the planet is under bombardment by Zagon spaceships guiding flaming meteors as weapons against them. The defensive "ionization layer" is failing, and the battle is entering its final stage. Metaluna's leader, the Monitor, reveals that the Metalunans intend to flee to Earth. He insists that Meacham and Adams be subjected to a Thought Transference Chamber to subjugate their free will. He further indicates this will be the fate of the rest of humanity after Metalunan relocation. Exeter believes that this is immoral and misguided.

Before the couple can be sent into the device, Exeter helps them escape. Exeter is badly injured by a mutant guard while he, Cal, and Ruth flee from Metaluna in the saucer. The planet's ionization layer becomes totally ineffective as they leave. Under the constant Zagon bombardment, Metaluna begins heating up and turns into a lifeless "radioactive sun". The mutant guard has also boarded the saucer and attacks Ruth, but dies as a result of the pressure barrier differences on the way back to Earth.

As they enter the Earth's atmosphere, Exeter sends Cal and Ruth away in their Stinson aircraft, declining to join them. Exeter is dying and the ship's energy is nearly depleted. The saucer flies out over the ocean, rapidly accelerates until it is enclosed in a fireball, and crashes into the water where it explodes.

== Cast ==
- Jeff Morrow as Exeter
- Faith Domergue as Dr. Ruth Adams
- Rex Reason as Dr. Cal Meacham
- Lance Fuller as Brack
- Russell Johnson as Dr. Steve Carlson
- Douglas Spencer as Monitor
- Regis Parton as Metaluna Mutant
- Robert Nichols as Joe Wilson
- Karl L. Lindt as Dr. Adolph Engelborg
- Orangey as Neutron the cat (uncredited)

== Production ==
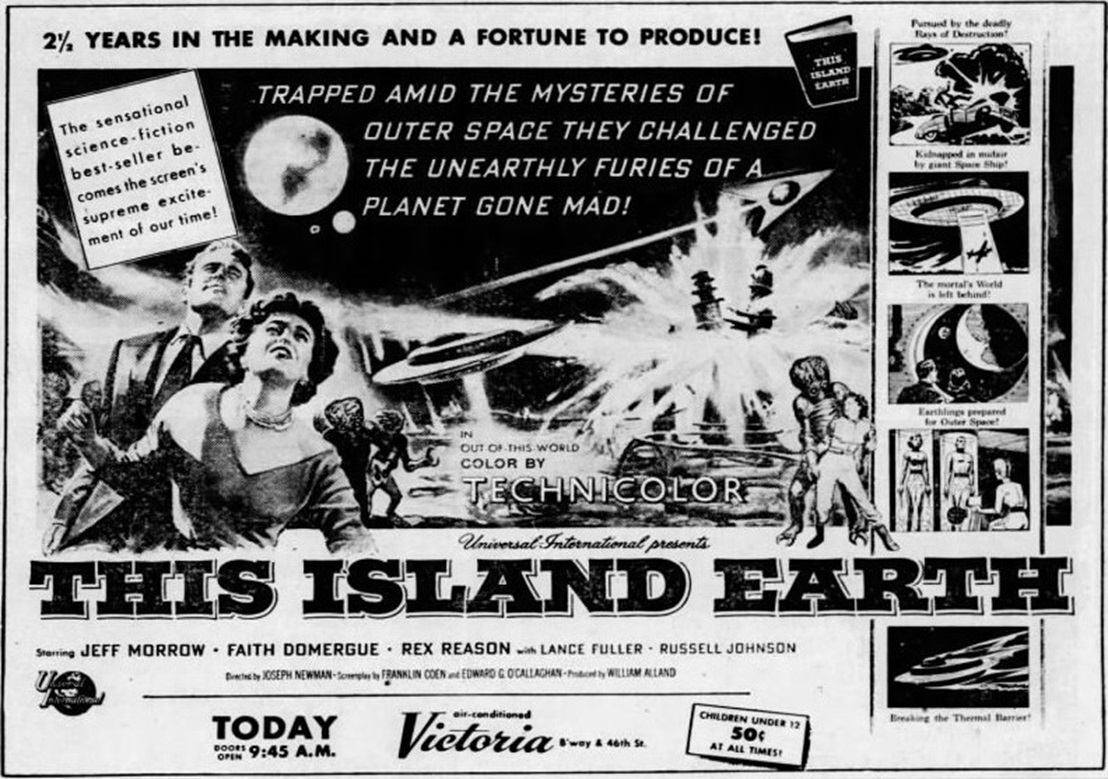
Theatre advertisement from 1955

Principal photography for This Island Earth took place from January 30 to March 22, 1954. Location work took place at Mt. Wilson, California. Most of the Metaluna sequence was directed by Jack Arnold; the front office was apparently dissatisfied with the footage Newman shot and had it redone by Arnold, who, unlike Newman, had several sci-fiction films to his credit.

Most of the sound effects, the ship, the interocitor, etc. are simply recordings of radio teletype transmissions picked up on a short-wave radio played at various speeds. In a magazine article, the special effects department admitted that the "mutant" costume originally had legs that matched the upper body, but they had so much trouble making the legs look and work properly that they were forced by studio deadline to simply have the mutant wear a pair of trousers. Universal-International's film posters show the mutant as it was supposed to appear.

This Island Earth was one of the very few "flat widescreen" titles to be printed direct-to-matrix by Technicolor. This specially ordered 35-millimeter printing process was intended to maintain the highest possible print quality, as well as to protect the film negative. Another Universal film that was also given the direct-to-matrix treatment was Written on the Wind.

== Reception ==
=== Box-office ===
This Island Earth was released on June 10, 1955, on a double bill with Universal's Abbott and Costello Meet the Mummy (1955), and by the end of that year had accrued US$1.7 million in distributors' domestic (United States and Canada) rentals, making it the year's 74th biggest earner. (Note: "Rentals" refers to the distributor/studio's share of the box office gross, which, according to Gebert, is roughly half of the money generated by ticket sales.)

=== Critical response ===
A review in The New York Times by Howard Thompson stated: "The technical effects of This Island Earth, Universal's first science-fiction excursion in color, are so superlatively bizarre and beautiful that some serious shortcomings can be excused, if not overlooked." "Whit" in Variety wrote: "Special effects of the most realistic type rival the story and characterizations in capturing the interest in this exciting science-fiction chiller, one of the most imaginative, fantastic and cleverly-conceived entries to date in the outer-space film field." Philip K. Scheuer of the Los Angeles Times was also positive, calling it "one of the most fascinating—and frightening—science-fiction movies to come at us yet from outer space ... To the camera and effects men must go the major laurels for making this wonders visible and audible—in awesome Technicolor and a sound track that is as ear-wracking as it is eerie." The Monthly Film Bulletin was less positive, writing: "Faced with the wonders of space, man's reactions prove, as usual, dreadfully limited. The dialogue—especially in the faked-up romance between Doctors Meacham and Adams—remains resolutely earth-bound, while the ending is simply a spacial variation on the conventional curtain. Joseph Newman has done his best to make his characters as intriguing as his special effects, but they have neither the stature nor the expression."

Since its original release, the critical response to the film has continued to be mostly positive. Bill Warren has written that the film was "the best and most significant science fiction movie of 1955 ... [it] remains a decent, competent example of any era's science fiction output." In Phil Hardy's The Aurum Film Encyclopedia: Science Fiction, the film was described as "a full-blooded space opera complete with interplanetary warfare and bug-eyed monsters ... the film's space operatics are given a dreamlike quality and a moral dimension that makes the dramatic situation far more interesting." Danny Peary felt that the film was "colorful, imaginative, gadget-laden sci-fi". At the film review aggregator website Rotten Tomatoes, the film holds a score of 75% based upon 16 reviews. Greater Milwaukee Today described it as "an appalling film".

== In popular culture ==
The design for the Metaluna Mutant has proved itself to be an iconic look for an alien, and is seen as a precursor to H. R. Giger's design for the Xenomorphs in the Alien franchise. This has led to the design being used in several homages, as well as the Metaluna Mutant himself making various appearances in film, television, games, and other forms of pop culture.

In 1961, Castle Films released a 9-to-12-minute (depending on projector speed) 8 mm segment of the film (with the retitle War of the Planets) for the home audience.

In Explorers (1985), one of the films that protagonist Ben watches is This Island Earth. In both films, the character builds a device with help from an alien so that they may meet.

A brief homage to This Island Earth is seen in E.T. the Extra-Terrestrial (1982). E.T. turns on the television during a showing of the film, at the scene when Cal and Ruth are being abducted by the aliens, and Cal says, "They're pulling us up!"

A segment of the television series Wonder Woman (1977) in episode #210 uses space battle footage from the film; the alien planet shown is also reused This Island Earth footage.

The video game Zak McKracken and the Alien Mindbenders (1988) contains key references to the film, such as large-headed aliens disguised as humans, communications through interstellar teleconferencing, and an aircraft being pulled into a flying saucer.

Shock rock metal band Gwar's fourth album, This Toilet Earth (1994), and its companion short-form film Skulhedface, contain numerous references to This Island Earth, including the title, an alien with an over-sized brain posing as a human, and communication between aliens using an interstellar teleconference device.

New Jersey punk rock band The Misfits included a song tribute entitled "This Island Earth" on their album American Psycho (1997).

Orbitron, the Man from Uranus, from the 1960s toy line "The Outer Space Men", also known as Colorform Aliens, is based on the Metaluna Mutant.

As a fan of This Island Earth, Weird Al Yankovic has featured the interocitor in his film UHF (1989) and the music video for "Dare to Be Stupid".

The Metaluna Mutant is one of many alien monsters held captive at Area 52 in Looney Tunes: Back in Action (2003). It is later one of the aliens released by Marvin the Martian.

Experimental pop artist Eric Millikin created a large mosaic portrait of the Metaluna Mutant out of Halloween candy and spiders as part of his "Totally Sweet" series in 2013.

This Island Earth is featured in Mystery Science Theater 3000: The Movie. In order to maintain a 73-minute runtime and to accommodate several "host segments", This Island Earth was edited down by about 20 minutes. Writer/star Michael J. Nelson said that This Island Earth was chosen to mock because, he felt, "nothing really happens" and "it violates all the rules of classical drama". Writer Kevin Murphy added that the film had many elements that the writing crew liked, such as "A hero who's a big-chinned white-guy scientist with a deep voice. A wormy sidekick guy. Huge-foreheaded aliens who nobody can quite figure out are aliens—there's just 'something different about them.' And a couple of rubber monsters who die on their own without the hero ever doing anything."

In the "Bad Bob" episode of the animated series ReBoot, a binome asks if Bob's car crash is due to a problem with its interocitor.

Dan Aykroyd cited This Island Earth as inspiration in part for the Coneheads he created on Saturday Night Live—aliens whose large heads go largely unmentioned by the earthlings who observe them.

A poster of the film appears in chapter 3, page 11 of the Alan Moore-Dave Gibbons graphic novel Watchmen.

== Home media ==
Shout Factory released the film on Blu-ray with a new 4K scan of the interpositive in two different aspect ratios: 1.85:1 and 1.37:1. The 1:37:1 version is available for rental on YouTube.
