= This Island Earth (novel) =

1952 novel by Raymond F. Jones

- First edition dust jacket
- Author: Raymond F. Jones
- Cover artist: Robert Johnson
- Language: English
- Genre: Science fiction
- Publisher: Shasta Publishers
- Publication date: 1952
- Publication place: United States
- Media type: Print (hardcover)
- Pages: 220
- OCLC: 62875599

This Island Earth is a 1952 science fiction novel by American writer Raymond F. Jones. It was first published in Thrilling Wonder Stories magazine as a serialized set of three novelettes by Jones: "The Alien Machine" in the June 1949 issue, "The Shroud of Secrecy" in the December 1949 issue, and "The Greater Conflict" in the February 1950 issue. These three stories were later combined and expanded into the 1952 novel This Island Earth. It became the basis for the 1955 Universal-International science fiction film also titled This Island Earth.

The story revolves around a race of aliens who, in recruiting humans for a group called "Peace Engineers", are actually using Earth as a pawn in an intergalactic war. While the film starts out in a very similar manner to the novel, the film's storyline quickly goes its own way.

== Plot ==
At Ryberg Instrument Corporation, engineer Cal Meacham has received a quartet of bead-like devices that are meant to replace the condensers that he ordered. Thinking it a joke he tests them anyway and finds that they work just as well as what he had ordered. He orders more and with them gets a catalog filled with electronic apparatus completely unfamiliar to him. His interest piqued, he orders the parts necessary to build what the catalog calls an "interocitor".

When he switches on the completed interocitor he is confronted by the appearance on its screen of a man who invites him to join a group called Peace Engineers. Knowing that he would not refuse the group sends a pilotless airplane to pick him up and take him to a small village and factory complex in a valley north of Phoenix, Arizona. He is greeted by Dr. Ruth Adams, a psychologist who seems to be afraid of something. Dr. Warner, the man he spoke with over the interocitor, tells him that he will be in charge of the interocitor assembly plant. He also meets Ole Swenberg, who was his roommate in college.

Six months later he meets the Chief Engineer, Mr. Jorgasnovara, who describes the Peace Engineers as a secret society of the world's greatest scientists and engineers, toiling to rationally control the world. Later, he overhears Jorgasnovara's thoughts through the interocitor in his laboratory. One night he and Ruth discover that the interocitors are being shipped out not by truck, but by spaceship. Again overhearing Jorgasnovara's thoughts Cal learns that the Peace Engineers are involved in an intergalactic war.

Cal believes that all of Earth should be participating in the war that the Peace Engineers have somehow gotten us into so he gathers documents and samples, takes a small airplane and flies to Washington. Halfway there he and his plane are snatched out of the air by a spaceship and taken to the Moon. There Jorgasnovara tells Cal, Ruth, and Ole that Peace Engineers is actually run by his people, aliens called "the Llanna", and that the Llanna are engaged in a millennia-long intergalactic war with aliens called "the Guarra". Earth is now being used in that war in a similar way to how certain small Pacific islands were used during World War II.

Returning to Earth, Cal, Ruth, and Ole find the plant being sabotaged. The Llannans decide to abandon it but before they leave Cal and Ruth discover that Ole is a Guarra sleeper agent. As a consequence of the interocitor-mediated battle that destroys Ole and his non-human henchmen, Jorgasnovara also dies.

Cal and Ruth are taken to Jorgasnovara's home world and told that Earth is to be completely abandoned, that the Guarra will destroy it as they have destroyed so many other worlds. Cal protests, but the Llannan Council tells him that their war computers have predicted that they would not defend Earth. But the Guarran war computers would tell the Guarra the same thing so Cal points out to the council that the very best tactic is to do what the Guarra would never expect. The Llannans agree to defend Earth and Cal and Ruth look forward to returning home.

== Title ==
In explaining the cosmic war his people are waging, Jorgasnovara compares Earth to a small Pacific island in the recently concluded Second World War. He explains that the natives could not comprehend the conflict raging around them, but that they can, nonetheless, contribute something to the war effort, such as by building airstrips. Jones had taken the novel title from a line in Robert Graves' poem, "Darien" ("It is a poet’s privilege and fate/To fall enamoured of the one Muse/Who variously haunts this island earth".)

== Publication history ==
The story was originally published as three stories in Thrilling Wonder Stories (published by Standard Magazines, Inc.):

- "The Alien Machine" (June 1949)
- "The Shroud of Secrecy" (December 1949)
- "The Greater Conflict" (February 1950)

The story was subsequently published in book form:

- 1952, USA, Shasta Publishers, December 1952, Hardcover (220 pp)
- 1953, USA, Shasta/SFBC, Pub date Sep 1953, Hardcover (220 pp)
- 1954, Sweden, Lindqvist (Atomböckerna), Hardcover (208 pp), as Universum Ockuperat (Universe Occupied)
- 1955, UK, T.V. Boardman, Hardcover (220 pp)
- 1955, USA, Shasta, Hardcover (220 pp)
- 1955, Italy, Arnoldo Mondadori Editore (I Romanzi di Urania #96), Paperback digest (128 pp), as Il cittadino dello spazio (The Citizen of Space)
- 1956, France, Gallimard (Le Rayon Fantastique #37), Paperback (253 pp), as Les survivants de l’infini (The Survivors of the Infinite)
- 1956, Germany, Pabel Verlag (Utopia Grossband #37), Paperback digest (89 pp), as Insel zwischen den Sternen (Island Between the Stars)
- 1957, Spain, Editora y Distribuidora Hispano Americana, S.A. (Colección Nebulae #41), Paperback, as Esta Isla la Tierra (This Island Earth)
- 1977, Italy, Libra Editrice (I Classici della Fantascienza #28), Pub date Oct 1977, Hardback (280 pp), as Il cittadino dello spazio (The Citizen of Space)
- 1991, UK, Grafton Books, ISBN 0-586-21050-4, Pub date Mar 1991, Paperback (191 pp)

== Reviews ==
At The Magazine of Fantasy and Science Fiction (May 1953) Boucher and McComas found the novel disappointing; after starting "with some fine technological gadgetry", it "becomes ultimately incredible in its galactic wildness (and offensive in its extreme labor-baiting)".

== Adaptations ==
Universal-International produced a film version of This Island Earth, released on June 1, 1955.

== Sources ==
- Chalker, Jack L.; Mark Owings (1998). The Science-Fantasy Publishers: A Bibliographic History, 1923–1998. Westminster, MD and Baltimore: Mirage Press, Ltd. p. 593.
- Clute, John; Nicholls, Peter (October 23, 2014). "Jones, Raymond F.". In Clute, John; Langford, David; Nicholls, Peter; Sleight, Graham (eds.). The Encyclopedia of Science Fiction. Gollancz. "This Island Earth (stories June 1949 – February 1950 Thrilling Wonder; fixup 1952) begins with beleaguered Aliens secretly using human scientists in order to resist an enemy in an intergalactic war which threatens to engulf Earth. The protagonist finally persuades them that, by allowing their tactics to be dictated by vast Computers, they have become predictable to the enemy. But he may be too late. The film version, This Island Earth (1954), begins well but loses interest when it diverges – perhaps inevitably – from the book, which became quite famous, all the same, due to the commercial impact of the movie."
- Tuck, Donald H. (1974). "This Island Earth". The Encyclopedia of Science Fiction and Fantasy. Chicago: Advent. pp. 247–248. ISBN 0-911682-20-1.
