= The Wheels of If and Other Science Fiction =

1948 collection of science fiction stories by L. Sprague de Camp

- first edition of The Wheels of If
- Author: L. Sprague de Camp
- Cover artist: Hannes Bok
- Language: English
- Genre: Science fiction
- Publisher: Shasta
- Publication date: 1948
- Publication place: United States
- Media type: Print (hardback)
- Pages: vii, 222 pp

The Wheels of If and Other Science Fiction is a 1948 collection of science fiction stories by L. Sprague de Camp, first published in hardback by Shasta and in paperback by Berkley Books in 1970. It has also been translated into German. All the stories were originally published in the magazines Astounding Science Fiction and Unknown.

== Contents ==
- "Foreword"
- "The Wheels of If"

Allister Park, a prosecutor and local politician is thrown into a parallel universe where due to very minor differences in the course of history, North America has been settled by descendants of the Vikings and New York is replaced by New Belfast. He endeavors to get back into his own universe using his ingenuity to gain influence in his new surroundings.

- "The Best-Laid Scheme"

This parody on other time travel stories is about a scientist who uses a time travel device to threaten all of North America with destruction through time travel paradoxes, and the secret agent attempting to stop him using a copy of the device.

- "The Warrior Race"

Earth has been taken over by the Centaurians, former humans who came back from space as a supremely ethical and powerful people. The heroes in the story, aided by an enigmatic historian, are mostly trying to salvage their corrupt economic schemes.

- "Hyperpilosity"

An apparent plague makes people grow bodily hair similar to that of Gorillas. Two doctors attempt to find a cure while large-scale societal changes happen around them.

- "The Merman"

Vernon Brock is a biologist who experiments with turning lungs into gills. After accidentally performing the transformation on himself, he is stuck underwater, unable to communicate, and attempts to resolve the situation using his limited knowledge.

- "The Contraband Cow"

In a future where many states have been united into a democratic state and the numerically superior Hindus are enforcing a ban on bovine meat, a young scientist working on in vitro meat gets into trouble with police and with meat smugglers.

- "The Gnarly Man"

An anthropologist meets a curious "ape-man" at a circus, who turns out to be a Neanderthal who stopped aging when he was struck by lightning 50,000 years ago. Struggles over the scientific value and rights of this "non-human" ensue.

== Reception ==
Astounding reviewer P. Schuyler Miller praised the stories as "representative examples of de Campian whimsy and reverse plot-twists."
