= The Toymaker =

1951 short story collection by Raymond F. Jones

- Dust-jacket from the first edition
- Author: Raymond F. Jones
- Cover artist: Jack Gaughan
- Language: English
- Genre: Science fiction
- Publisher: Fantasy Publishing Company, Inc.
- Publication date: 1951
- Publication place: United States
- Media type: Print (hardback & paperback)
- Pages: 287 pp
- OCLC: 3437888

The Toymaker is a collection of science fiction short stories by Raymond F. Jones. It was first published in 1951 by Fantasy Publishing Company, Inc. in an edition of 1,300 copies of which 1,000 were hardback. The stories originally appeared in the magazines Astounding and Fantastic Adventures.

== Contents ==
- "The Model Shop"
- "Deadly Host"
- "Utility"
- "Forecast"
- "The Toymaker"
- "The Children’s Room"

== Reception ==
Forrest J. Ackerman wrote in Astounding that "Jones' first volume is a joymaker" with a good sampling of stories.
