= Antoni Palau i Dulcet =

Spanish writer (1867–1954)

Antoni Palau Dulcet (Montblanc, 1867 – Barcelona, 1954), librarian and bibliographer, author of the monumental Manual del librero hispano americano (Hispanic American bookseller Manual , (1923–1945), Conca de Barbera (1912), and numerous guides from "Montblanc, Poblet i la Conca" (1930–1932).

== Biography ==
He investigated the introduction of press in Spain in the De los orígenes de la imprenta y su introducción en España ( From the origins of printing and its introduction in Spain ), 1952.

He is best known as the author of an indispensable Manual del librero hispano-americano: inventario bibliográfico de la producción científica y literaria de España y de la América Latina desde la invención de la imprenta hasta nuestros días, con el valor comercial de todos los artículos descritos (1923–1945), en siete volúmenes ( Handbook of the Spanish-American bookseller: bibliographic survey of scientific and literary production of Spain and Latin America since the invention of printing to our days, with the market value of all the items described (1923–1945), in seven volumes).

In its second edition it consisted of 28 volumes published between 1948 and 1977, and seven volumes of indices between 1981 and 1987 by Agustín Palau Claveras with: Alphabetical title-materials, corrections and additions connections, a total of 35 volumes.

He also prepared bibliographies of Miguel de Cervantes and Francisco de Quevedo and an interesting autobiography, Memòries d'un llibreter català ( Memoirs of a Catalan bookseller ) (1935), which demonstrates his humanist spirit and Cultural altruistic desire.

He was named favorite son of Montblanc in 1949. On 31 July 1949, the mayor of the "Vila Ducal", Jose Maria Abelló Barrios handed him the silver medal.

== Work ==
- El Año artístico y literario en Barcelona 1895 Barcelona: Establecimiento Tipográfico, 1896
- Bibliografia cronològica de Balmes Barcelona: Imp. Fills de Jepús, 1915
- Bibliografía de Cervantes con el valor commercial de las obras descritas por Antonio Palau y Dulcet Barcelona: Librería anticuaria, 1924
- Bibliografía de don Miguel de Cervantes Saavedra Barcelona: Librería Palau, Asociación de libreros y amigos del libro, 1950
- Bibliografía de la Conca de Barberà Barcelona, 1915
- La biblioteca del Marquès de Lió: notícia Barcelona: Llibreria Antiquària d'Antoni Palau, 1909
- Conca de Barbarà Barcelona: Impremta Romana, 1931–1932
  - 1 – Guia de Montblanch Barcelona: Impremta Romana, 1931
  - II – Guia de Poblet Barcelona: Impremta Romana, 1931
  - III – Guia de la Conca Barcelona: Impremta Romana, 1932 (edició facsímil Montblanc: Consell Comarcal de la Conca de Barberà, 2007 ISBN 9788461213702)
- La Conca de Barberá: monografía histórica y descriptiva Barcelona: Francesc Altés impressor, 1912
- De llibres i llibreters Barcelona: Antonio Palau, 1924
- Librería anticuaria de Antonio Palau Barcelona: Antonio Palau, 1909
- Manual del librero hispano-americano: inventario bibliográfico de la producción científica y literaria de España y de la América Latina desde la invención de la imprenta hasta nuestro días, con el valor comercial de todos los artículos descritos Barcelona: Libreria Anticuaria, 1923–1927. 7 volums
  - Edició facsímil Manual del librero hispano-americano: inventario bibliográfico de la producción científica y literaria de España y de la América Latina desde la invención de la imprenta hasta nuestro días, con el valor comercial de todos los artículos descritos. En 7 volums, Madrid: Julio Ollero, 1990 ISBN 8478960082, reimpresa el 2004 ISBN 847895189X)
- Manual del librero hispano-americano: bibliografía general española e hispano-americana desde la invención de la imprenta hasta nuestros tiempos, con el valor comercial de los impresos descritos 2a ed. corregida. Barcelona : Librería Palau, 1948–1977. 28 volums
  - Agustín Palau Claveras Índice alfabético de títulos-materias, correcciones, conexiones y adiciones del Manual del Librero Hispanoamericano de Antonio Palau Dulcet Empúries: Palacete Palau Dulcet; Oxford: The Dolphin Book, 1981–1987 ISBN 8430047522 (v. 1), 8430071695 (v. 2), 8430094822 (v. 3), 8439811594 (v. 4), 8439835493 (v. 5), 8439857969 (v. 6), 8439884958 (v. 7)
  - Agustín Palau Claveras Addenda & corrigenda o Volúmen complementario del tomo primero del Manual del librero hispanoamericano de Antonio Palau y Dulcet Barcelona: Palacete Palau y Dulcet, 1990 ISBN 8440475950
- Memorias de libreros Madrid: Librería para bibliófilos, 1949
- Memòries d'un llibreter català Barcelona: Llibreria Catalònia, 1935
  - Edició castellana Memorias de un librero catalan, 1867–1935 Barcelona: Llibreria Catalònia, 1935
- Los orígenes de la imprenta en España Barcelona; Palau, 1948
  - De los origenes de la imprenta y su introducción en España Barcelona: Librería Palau, 1952
- Refranes castellanos y sentencias de los Santos Padres: texto del siglo XVIII Barcelona: Imp. Ràfols, 1928
- La Semana Santa en Montblanch en 1928 Barcelona: Impremta Ràfols, 1928
- La vespra de Sant Joan a Montblanch en 1927 Montblanch: Cal Sala, 1927

== Bibliography ==
Antoni Palau i Dulcet i Josep Porter i Rovira: dos montblanquins apassionats pels llibres. Montblanc: Centre d'Estudis de la Conca de Barberà. Col·lecció biografies 2. 2007. ISBN 978-84-921799-2-3

== See also ==
- La Cartografía Mallorquina
- Memorias históricas (Capmany)
- Història de la Marina Catalana
- Mestre Jácome
- Abraham Cresques
- Arte de navegar
- Antonio de Capmany
- Próspero de Bofarull y Mascaró
