= Curme Gray =

American novelist

- Born: 1910
- Died: 1980 (aged 69–70)
- Occupation: Novelist
- Writing career
- Genre: Science fiction

Curme Gray (1910–1980) was an American novelist. His Science fiction novel, Murder in Millennium VI (1951) was the subject of a detailed analysis in Damon Knight's In Search of Wonder.
