= The Checklist of Fantastic Literature =

Bibliography compiled and edited by Everett F. Bleiler

- Dust-jacket from the first edition
- Author: edited by Everett F. Bleiler
- Cover artist: Hannes Bok
- Language: English
- Genre: Bibliography
- Publisher: Shasta Publishers
- Publication date: 1948
- Publication place: United States
- Media type: Print (Hardback)
- Pages: xii, 453
- OCLC: 1113926

The Checklist of Fantastic Literature is a bibliography of English science fiction, fantasy and weird books compiled and edited by Everett F. Bleiler with a preface by Melvin Korshak and a cover by Hannes Bok.

With a print run of 1,933 copies, it was the first book from Shasta Publishers. The bibliography is nearly complete and lists over 5,000 titles published prior to 1949. The books are listed by author and indexed by title. Willy Ley described it as "indispensable to librarians, book dealers, and especially antiquarians."

== Publication history ==
- 1948, US, Shasta Publishers OCLC 1113926, Pub date 1948, Hardback
- 1972, US, Fax Collectors Editions OCLC 991525, Pub date 1972, Hardback
- 1978, US, Firebell Books OCLC 4388945, Pub date 1978, Hardback, revised as The Checklist of Science Fiction and Supernatural Fiction
