= Kinsmen of the Dragon =

1951 novel by Stanley Mullen

- Dust-jacket from the first edition
- Author: Stanley Mullen
- Cover artist: Hannes Bok
- Language: English
- Genre: Fantasy novel
- Publisher: Shasta Publishers
- Publication date: 1951
- Publication place: United States
- Media type: Print (Hardback)
- Pages: 336 pp
- OCLC: 6293444

Kinsmen of the Dragon is a fantasy novel by author Stanley Mullen. It was published in 1951 by Shasta Publishers in an edition of 3,500 copies. The book had originally been announced by Mullen's own Gorgon Press. The jacket art was by Hannes Bok.

== Plot introduction ==
The novel concerns an empire of invisible wizards and adventure in the realm of Annwyn.

== Reception ==
Writing in The New York Times, J. Francis McComas declared that "Practically every theme of fantasy and science fiction has been mistreated in this silly melodrama." Damon Knight described it as the paradigm of the idiot-plotted story, "a plot that is kept in motion solely by the fact that everyone involved is an idiot." James Blish characterized it as "an incredibly bad novel from any point of view," suggesting that other genre reviewers had been "gentle" with Mullen because he was a popular member of the fan community.

However, Astounding reviewer Forrest J Ackerman pseudonymously found Kinsmen to be "a first-class first novel, blending astounding science with unknown wizardry."
