= Raymond F. Jones =

American novelist

- Born: Raymond Fisher Jones; November 15, 1915; Salt Lake City, Utah, USA
- Died: January 24, 1994 (aged 78); Sandy, Utah, USA
- Known for: This Island Earth

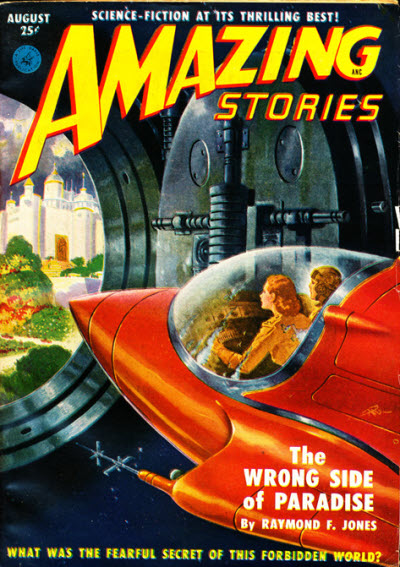
Jones's novella "The Wrong Side of Paradise" was the cover story in the August 1951 issue of Amazing Stories.

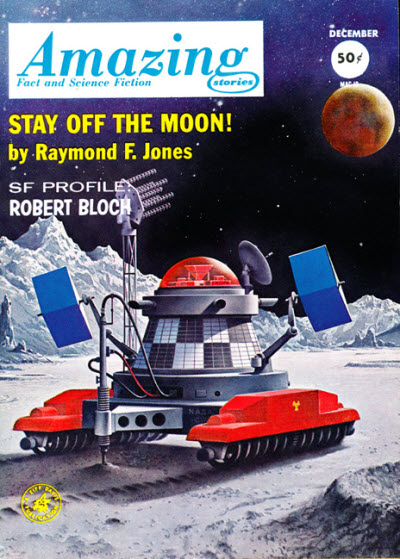
Jones's novelette "Stay Off the Moon!" was the cover story on the December 1962 issue of Amazing Stories.

Raymond Fisher Jones (15 November 1915 – 24 January 1994) was an American science fiction author. He is best known for his 1952 novel This Island Earth, which was adapted into the eponymous 1955 film.

== Personal life ==
Jones was born at Salt Lake City, Utah, and was a member of the Church of Jesus Christ of Latter-day Saints from birth. He died at Sandy, Utah, in 1994.

== Career ==
Most of Jones' short fiction was published during the 1940s, '50s and '60s, in magazines such as Thrilling Wonder Stories, Astounding Stories, and Galaxy. His sixteen novels were published between 1951 and 1978.

His short story "Rat Race", first published in the April 1966 issue of Analog Science Fiction and Fact, was nominated for a Hugo Award. In 1996, "Correspondence Course", first published in the April 1945 edition of Astounding Stories, was nominated for a Retro Hugo award for best short story. Another short story, "The Alien Machine", first published in the June 1949 edition of Thrilling Wonder Stories, was later combined with two other short stories, "The Shroud of Secrecy" and "The Greater Conflict", and expanded into the novel This Island Earth, upon which the movie of the same name was based.

Jones also wrote the story upon which a 1952 Tales of Tomorrow television program episode, titled "The Children's Room", was based.

Jones short story, "Tools of the Trade", that appeared in the November 1950 issue of Astounding, was the first story dealing with 3D printing, although he called it "Molecular Spray".

In 1978, three of his stories were dramatized and released through audio cassette by AudiSee: The Renegades of Time (The Lost Ones), The King of Eolim (The Star Prince) and The Rebels of Empiria. All three adaptations were sold with an accompanying art-filled booklet.

== Bibliography ==
=== Novels and collections ===
- The Alien (1951), OCLC 1872654
- Renaissance (1951), OCLC 1601340
- The Toymaker (1951), OCLC 3437888
- Son of the Stars (1952), OCLC 1601327
- This Island Earth (1952), OCLC 6122497
- Planet of Light (1953), OCLC 1137088
- The Secret People (1956), OCLC 6362798
- The Year When Stardust Fell (1958), OCLC 1137133
- The Cybernetic Brains (1962), OCLC 1915415
- The Non-Statistical Man (1964), OCLC 1881957
- Voyage to the Bottom of the Sea (1965), OCLC 5871064
- Syn (1969), OCLC 6083296

=== Short stories ===
- "Test of the Gods" (September, 1941)
- "The Children's Room" (1942)
- "Starting Point" (1942)
- "Swimming Lesson" (1943)
- "Pacer" (1943)
- "Fifty Million Monkeys (1943)
- "Utility" (1944) [as by David Anderson]
- Renaissance series (1944)
- "Deadly Host" (1945)
- "Correspondence Course" (1945)
- "Black Market" (1946)
- "Forecast" (1946)
- "The Cat and the King" (1946)
- "The Toymaker" (1946)
- "The Seven Jewels of Chamar" (1946)
- "Pete Can Fix It" (1947)
- "The Martian Circe" (1947)
- "The Model Shop" (1947)
- "The Person from Porlock" (1947)
- "The Alien Machine, featuring Cal Meacham" (1949)
- "Production Test" (1949)
- "The Shroud of Secrecy, featuring Cal Meacham" (1949)
- "Outpost Infinity" (1950)
- "The Greater Conflict, featuring Cal Meacham" (1950)
- "Regulations Provide" (1950)
- "Encroachment" (1950)
- "Portrait of Narcissus" (1950)
- "Sunday is Three Thousand Years Away" (1950)
- "The Cybernetic Brains" (1950)
- "Discontinuity" (1950)
- "Tools of the Trade" (1950)
- "A Stone and a Spear" (1950)
- "Divided We Fall. . ." (1950)
- "I Tell You Three Times" (1951)
- "... As Others See Us" (1951)
- "Alarm Reaction" (1951)
- "The Wrong Side of Paradise" (1951)
- "Seed" (1951)
- "The Farthest Horizon" (1952)
- "Collision" (1952)
- "Doomsday's Color-Press" (1952)
- "Noise Level" (1952)
- "Canterbury April" (1952)
- "The Moon Is Death" (1953)
- "Intermission Time (1953)
- "Trade Secret" (1953)
- "The Colonists" (1954)
- "The Unlearned" (1954)
- "The School" (1954)
- "The Gift of the Gods" (1955)
- "Cubs of the Wolf" (1955)
- "Human Error" (1956)
- "Academy for Pioneers" (1956)
- "The Deviates" (1956)
- "The Non-Statistical Man" (1956)
- "The Thinking Machine" (1956)
- "A Matter of Culture" (1956)
- "The Gardener" (1957)
- "The Star Dream" (1957)
- "The Strad Effect" (1958)
- "The Memory of Mars" (1961)
- "The Great Gray Plague" (1962)
- "Stay Off the Moon!" (1962)
- "Rider in the Sky" (1964)
- "Rat Race" (1966)
- "Subway to the Stars" (1968)
- "The Laughing Lion" (1973)
- "Pet" (1973)
- "The Lights of Mars" (1973)
- "A Bowl of Biskies Makes a Growing Boy" (1973)
- "The Lions of Rome" (1973)
- "Time Brother" (1973)
- "Reflection of a Star" (1974)
- "Flauna" (1974)
- "The Touch of Your Hand" (1974)
- "Death Eternal" (1978)
- "Weeping May Tarry" (1978, written with Lester del Rey)

== Free ebooks ==
Several of his stories have been made available for free by the Gutenberg Project, despite their relatively recent publication, because they fell into the public domain when the original copyright was not renewed, including: The Great Gray Plague, The Memory of Mars, Cubs of the Wolf, The Colonists, The Year When Stardust Fell, The Unlearned, The Alien, and Human Error, plus the Japanese book 火星の記憶.

There are also a couple of stories available on Wikisource.
