= Renaissance (novel) =

1944 novel by Raymond F. Jones

- Dust-jacket from the first edition
- Author: Raymond F. Jones
- Cover artist: David Kyle
- Language: English
- Genre: Science fiction
- Publisher: Gnome Press
- Publication date: 1951
- Publication place: United States
- Media type: Print (hardcover)
- Pages: 255
- ISBN: 978-1-4344-6691-4
- OCLC: 1601340

Renaissance is a science fiction novel by American writer Raymond F. Jones. The novel was originally serialized in the magazine Astounding in 1944. It was published in 1951 by Gnome Press in an edition of 4,000 copies. It was reprinted by Pyramid Books in 1963 and subsequently under the title Man of Two Worlds.

== Plot introduction ==
The story concerns two worlds: the remnants of Earth, which has been destroyed, and Kronweld, which exists in another plane.

== Reception ==
P. Schuyler Miller described Renaissance as "a strangely moving book, overcoming its lack of characterization and other traditional shortcomings by [its] drive and sweep of imagination."

== Sources ==
- Chalker, Jack L.; Mark Owings (1998). The Science-Fantasy Publishers: A Bibliographic History, 1923-1998. Westminster, MD and Baltimore: Mirage Press, Ltd. p. 299.
- Tuck, Donald H. (1974). The Encyclopedia of Science Fiction and Fantasy. Chicago: Advent. p. 247. ISBN 0-911682-20-1.
