= Stanley Mullen =

American novelist (1911–1974)

- Born: June 20, 1911; Colorado Springs, Colorado
- Died: 1974 (aged 62–63); Grandview, Washington
- Occupations: Artist; novelist; short story writer; publisher; museum curator
- Writing career
- Pen name: John Peter Drummond, Stanley Beecher, Lee Beecher
- Period: 1940's
- Genres: Science fiction, Fantasy

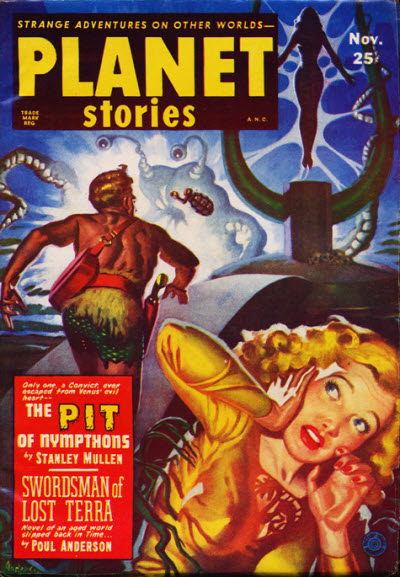
Mullen's novelette "The Pit of Nympthons" was the cover story in the November 1951 Planet Stories

Stanley Mullen (June 20, 1911 – 1974) was an American artist, short story writer, novelist and publisher. He studied writing at the University of Colorado at Boulder and drawing, painting and lithography at the Colorado Springs Fine Arts Center where he was accepted as a professional member in 1937. A series of his paintings of Indian ceremonial dances is part of the permanent collection of the Denver Art Museum. Mullen worked as assistant curator of the Colorado State Historical Museum during the 1940s.

== Writing career ==
Mullen wrote over 200 stories and articles in a variety of fields. He became involved with the small press publisher New Collector's Group (co-founded by Paul Dennis O'Connor and Martin Greenberg) before starting his own small press publisher, Gorgon Press, in 1948.

Gorgon Press published only one book - Mullen's prose and verse collection Moonfoam and Sorceries and was also the imprint under which 11 issues of Mullen's fanzine, The Gorgon, were issued. . His novel Kinsmen of the Dragon was originally planned as a publication of Gorgon Press but was ultimately issued by Shasta Publishers.

== Books by Stanley Mullen ==
- The Sphinx Child (chapbook; New Collectors Group, 1948)
- Moonfoam and Sorceries (collection of short stories and poems; Gorgon Press, 1948). Edition of 1000 numbered copies, all signed by both the author and the illustrator (Roy V. Hunt).
- Kinsmen of the Dragon (Shasta Publishers, 1951) (Jacket art by Hannes Bok)

== Awards ==
- 1959, Mullen's story "Space to Swing a Cat" was nominated for a Hugo Award for Best Short Story.
