= Deaths in May 1993 =

The following is a list of notable deaths in May 1993.

Entries for each day are listed alphabetically by surname. A typical entry lists information in the following sequence:

- Name, age, country of citizenship at birth, subsequent country of citizenship (if applicable), reason for notability, cause of death (if known), and reference.

== May 1993 ==
=== 1 ===
- Pietro Acquarone, 76, Italian footballer (Sanremese, Roma, Pisa).
- Erwan Bergot, 63, French army officer and author.
- Pierre Bérégovoy, 67, French politician and prime minister (1992–1993), suicide by gunshot.
- Alfredo Pareja Diezcanseco, 84, Ecuadorian novelist, journalist, and diplomat.
- Donald Dupree, 74, American bobsledder and Olympic medalist (1948).
- Henri Ellenberger, 87, Canadian psychiatrist, medical historian, and criminologist.
- Gerald Fowler, 58, British politician, MP (1966–1970, 1974–1979), cancer.
- Narayan Ganesh Gore, 85, Indian politician.
- Warren P. Knowles, 84, American politician and governor (1965–1971), heart attack.
- Ranasinghe Premadasa, 68, President of Sri Lanka (1989-1993), assassination by suicide bomber.
- Amos Wilder, 97, American poet, minister, and theology professor.

=== 2 ===
- Luigi Bestagini, 73, Italian Olympic ice hockey player (1948).
- Jim Cleary, 78, Australian rules footballer.
- Julio Gallo, 83, American winemaker (E & J Gallo Winery), traffic collision.
- John S. Gleason, Jr., 78, American banker and political figure.
- Thorkild Jacobsen, 88, Danish assyriologist and archaeologist.
- Stephen Juba, 78, Canadian politician.
- Ivan Lapikov, 70, Soviet-Russian actor (Andrei Rublev, The Brothers Karamazov, Eternal Call).
- Karl-Friedrich Merten, 87, German U-boat commander during World War II, cancer.
- André Moynet, 71, French fighter pilot, businessman, and politician, MNA (1946–1967).
- George Southall, 85, British Olympic track cyclist (1928).
- Will Weng, 86, American journalist and crossword puzzle editor (The New York Times).

=== 3 ===
- Libero Bigiaretti, 86, Italian novelist.
- Robert De Niro Sr., 71, American painter, father of Robert De Niro, cancer.
- Joe Lukeman, 91, Australian rules footballer.
- Duncan Macpherson, 68, Canadian cartoonist.
- Bjørn Rørholt, 73, Norwegian military officer, and resistance member during World War II.
- Hermína Týrlová, 92, Czech animator, screen writer, and film director.

=== 4 ===
- Margret Borgs, 84, German Olympic diver (1928).
- Frank Kudelka, 67, American basketball player (Chicago Stags, Washington Capitols, Philadelphia Warriors).
- Ray McDonald, 48, American gridiron football player (Washington Redskins), complications from sickle cell anemia.
- Ernst Reitermaier, 74, Austrian football player and manager.
- Shianghao Wang, 77, Chinese mathematician.
- France Štiglic, 73, Slovenian film director and screenwriter.

=== 5 ===
- Iakov Bielopolski, 76, Soviet architect.
- Dermot Boyle, 88, British RAF marshall.
- Louis Brooks, 82, American R&B saxophonist and bandleader.
- John Brady, 89, Australian trade unionist and politician.
- Georges Carrier, 82, French Olympic basketball player (1936).
- Irving Howe, 72, American socialist activist, cardiovascular disease.
- Taimi Mattsson, 79, Finnish Olympic fencer (1952).
- Malcolm Metcalf, 82, American Olympic javelin thrower (1932, 1936).
- Dick Metz, 84, American golfer.
- Algot Törneman, 83, Swedish painter.
- Paul Wegener, 84, German Nazi Party official and politician.

=== 6 ===
- Ivy Benson, 79, English musician and bandleader.
- Vane Bor, 84, Serbian artist.
- Henri Conchy, 84, French footballer.
- Rommel Fernández, 27, Panamanian football player, traffic collision.
- Dorothy B. Hughes, 88, American crime writer, literary critic, and historian.
- Ian Mikardo, 84, British politician, stroke.
- Ann Todd, 86, English actress (The Seventh Veil, The Paradine Case, Perfect Strangers), stroke.

=== 7 ===
- Zhao Boping, 90, Chinese politician.
- Eddie Cranage, 75, Australian rules footballer.
- Harold Danforth, 77, Canadian politician, MP (1958–1962, 1963–1974).
- Cee Farrow, 36, German-American new wave singer ("Should I Love You"), complications from AIDS.
- Roger Keesing, 57, American linguist and anthropologist, heart attack.
- Valeriano López, 67, Peruvian footballer (Sport Boys, Deportivo Cali, national team), cerebral hemorrhage.
- Jameel Mahmood, 54, Indian army lieutenant general, general commanding officer of the Eastern Command (since 1992), helicopter crash.
- Eric Olsen, 77, American Olympic sailor (1956).
- Mary Philbin, 90, American silent film actress (The Phantom of the Opera, The Man Who Laughs, Love Me and the World Is Mine), pneumonia.
- Hap Sharp, 65, American race car driver, suicide.
- Thurman Tucker, 75, American baseball player (Chicago White Sox, Cleveland Indians).

=== 8 ===
- Dele Charley, 45, Sierra Leonean playwright.
- Debiprasad Chattopadhyaya, 74, Indian Marxist philosopher.
- Avram Davidson, 70, American fiction writer (The Phoenix and the Mirror, Masters of the Maze, The Adventures of Doctor Eszterhazy).
- Enrique Larrinaga, 82, Spanish footballer (Racing de Santander, Asturias, national team).
- Alwin Nikolais, 82, American choreographer, cancer.
- Gabriel Pita da Veiga y Sanz, 84, Spanish naval admiral, minister of the Navy (1973–1977).
- Marti Stevens, 54, American educator and theater director, asthma.
- Al Tate, 74, American baseball player (Pittsburgh Pirates).
- Edward Ward, 7th Viscount Bangor, 87, English-Irish hereditary peer.

=== 9 ===
- Mario Baeza, 77, Chilean footballer.
- Reginald Bryan, 77, English cricketer and British Army officer.
- Joe Churchman, 68, Australian rules footballer.
- Ted Cieslak, 80, American Major League Baseball player (Philadelphia Phillies).
- Jacques Dextraze, 73, Canadian military officer.
- Mary Duncan, 98, American actress (City Girl, Morning Glory).
- Kenneth Eather, 91, Australian Army officer.
- Penelope Gilliatt, 61, English novelist and screenwriter (Sunday Bloody Sunday).
- Maggie Hemingway, 47, British novelist, aplastic anemia.
- Freya Madeline Stark, 100, British-Italian travel writer and explorer.
- Albert Sukop, 80, German footballer (Eintracht Braunschweig).
- Pete Sunkett, 75, American baseball player.

=== 10 ===
- Lester del Rey, 77, American science fiction author (Badge of Infamy, Marooned on Mars, Moon of Mutiny).
- Peng Mingzhi, 88, Chinese general and diplomat.
- Jack Peel, 72, British trade union leader.
- Stanisław Piłat, 84, Polish Olympic boxer (1936).
- Dermot Sheriff, 72, Irish Olympic basketball player (1948).
- Egon Vogel, 84, German actor.
- Pedro Vuskovic, 69, Croatian-Chilean economist and politician.

=== 11 ===
- Zhao Cangbi, 77, Chinese politician and official.
- Chen Chi-chuan, 94, Taiwanese politician.
- Magli Elster, 80, Norwegian psychoanalyst, literary critic, and poet.
- Minnie Gentry, 77, American actress (Def by Temptation, All My Children, School Daze).
- Hugh Hudson, 62, Australian politician, cancer.
- Sher Mohammad Marri, 58, Pakistani tribal chief and military figure.
- Shahu Modak, 75, Indian actor.
- Gene Selawski, 57, American gridiron football player (Los Angeles Rams, Cleveland Browns, San Diego Chargers).
- Nils Sjöblom, 83, Finnish Olympic fencer (1948, 1952).
- Torsten Ullman, 84, Swedish Olympic sport shooter (1936, 1948, 1952, 1956, 1960).
- Leigh Wiener, 63, American photographer and photojournalist, complications of Sweet's syndrome.

=== 12 ===
- Stanisław Baran, 73, Polish football player.
- Teodor Bârcă, 98, Moldovan politician and professor.
- Zeno Colò, 72, Italian Olympic alpine skier (1948, 1952), lung cancer.
- Evert Dolman, 47, Dutch cyclist and Olympian (1964).
- Capt. John Treasure Jones, 87, British sea officer, aneurysm.
- Franjo Palković, 86, Yugoslavian Olympic wrestler (1928).
- Ulf Palme, 72, Swedish film actor.
- Marek Roszczynialski, 75, Polish Olympic equestrian (1960).
- Edda Seippel, 73, German actress, cancer.
- Shamser Bahadur Singh, 82, Indian poet and writer.

=== 13 ===
- Robert Adley, 58, British politician, MP (since 1970), heart attack.
- Friedrich Dörr, 85, German Catholic priest and professor of theology.
- Elton Fax, 83, American illustrator.
- Shmuel Gogol, 69, Polish-born Israeli harmonica player.
- Bede Griffiths, 86, British priest and Benedictine monk.
- Milt Jordan, 65, American baseball player (Detroit Tigers).
- Wolfgang Lotz, 72, Israeli spy.
- Don Manson, 74, Australian rugby league footballer.
- M. K. Menon, 64, Indian writer.

=== 14 ===
- Aziz El-Shawan, 77, Egyptian composer.
- Patrick Haemers, 40, Belgian criminal, suicide by hanging.
- William Randolph Hearst Jr., 85, American newspaper publisher.
- Karin Luts, 89, Estonian painter and a graphic artist.
- Ross Ousley, 56, Australian rules footballer.
- Melvin Swig, 75, American real estate developer and philanthropist.

=== 15 ===
- Kodandera Madappa Cariappa, 94, Indian Commander-in-Chief, arthritis.
- Herbert Grötzsch, 90, German mathematician.
- Francisco Quiroz, 35, Dominican boxing champion, killed in a nightclub brawl.
- John Row, 88, Australian politician.
- Robert Tanneveau, 81, French cyclist.

=== 16 ===
- Jibaraj Ashrit, 48, Nepali politician, traffic collision.
- Madan Kumar Bhandari, 41, Nepali politician, traffic collision.
- Eduardo Campbell, 59, Panamanian Olympic wrestler (1960, 1964).
- Bernard Chanda, 41, Zambian football player.
- Dezső Ákos Hamza, 89, Hungarian film director (Strano appuntamento).
- Marv Johnson, 54, American R&B singer, songwriter and pianist, stroke.
- John Lookabaugh, 70, American football player (Washington Redskins).
- James Taylor, 75, Scottish sportsman.

=== 17 ===
- Henrique Anjos, 41, Portuguese Olympic sailor (1972, 1984, 1988).
- Earl Chudoff, 85, American lawyer and politician, member of the United States House of Representatives (1949-1958).
- Joe Ploski, 89, Polish-American film and television actor.
- Andre Resampa, 68, Malagasy government minister.
- Elizabeth Montgomery Wilmot, 91, English artist.
- Peter E. Perry, 91, American politician, member of the Pennsylvania House of Representatives (1965–1968, 1969–1976).
- Bill Wallace, 80, American college football player (Rice Owls).

=== 18 ===
- Heinrich Albertz, 78, German politician, Governing Mayor of Berlin (1966–1967).
- Stephen Cheong, 51, Hong Kong industrialist and politician, heart attack.
- Ronald Haver, 54, American film historian and author, AIDS-related illness.
- Heinz Knoke, 72, German flying ace during World War II and politician.
- Domingo Romo, 76, Chilean football player.

=== 19 ===
- Nemesio Antúnez, 75, Chilean painter.
- Winston Burdett, 79, American broadcast journalist and correspondent.
- Oscar Grimes, 78, American Major League Baseball player (Cleveland Indians, New York Yankees, Philadelphia Athletics).
- Richard Murphy, 81, American film director (Three Stripes in the Sun) and screenwriter (Boomerang, The Desert Rats), stroke.
- Ranga Sohoni, 75, Indian cricketer, heart attack.
- Lucien Troupel, 74, French football player and manager.
- John A. Wilson, 49, American politician, suicide by hanging.

=== 20 ===
- Al Aber, 65, American baseball player (Detroit Tigers, Cleveland Indians, Kansas City Athletics).
- Stevan Bodnarov, 87, Serbian sculptor, painter and political commissar.
- Virginia Cutler, 87, American academic, Alzheimer's disease.
- Dragoljub Janošević, 69, Yugoslav chess grandmaster.
- Carmelo Pace, 86, Maltese composer and music professor.

=== 21 ===
- Paul Anthony, 69, American basketball player.
- John Frost, 80, British Army officer (Battle of Arnhem).
- Pete Hecomovich, 74, American basketball player.
- John Holland, 85, American actor (Perry Mason, My Fair Lady, How to Succeed in Business Without Really Trying).
- Vytautas Landsbergis-Žemkalnis, 100, Lithuanian architect.
- Omar Pkhakadze, 48, Georgian sprint cyclist and Olympic medalist (1964, 1968, 1972).

=== 22 ===
- Herbert Callen, 73, American physicist, Alzheimer's disease.
- Mieczysław Horszowski, 100, Polish-American pianist.
- David Rees, 57, English author, lecturer and reviewer, AIDS.
- Irma Vila, 76, Mexican ranchera singer and actress (Canta y no llores...).
- Carl Johan Wachtmeister, 90, Swedish army officer and Olympic fencer (1936).
- Juice Wilson, 89, American jazz violinist.

=== 23 ===
- Luigi Brunella, 79, Italian football defender and manager.
- Rags Carter, 64, American race car driver.
- Julian de Ajuriaguerra, 82, Spanish-French psychologist.
- Veniamin Emmanuilovich Dymshits, 83, Soviet engineer and apparatchik.
- Jaime Loyola, 61, Puerto Rican Olympic sport shooter (1964).
- James Millhollin, 77, American actor (No Time for Sergeants, Grindl, The Student Teachers), cancer.

=== 24 ===
- Carl Billquist, 60, Swedish actor.
- Stanley Butler, 83, British Olympic cyclist (1932).
- Jack Gould, 79, American journalist and critic.
- Hendrik de Kok, 91, South African Olympic rower (1928).
- Carlton E. Morse, 91, American radio producer (One Man's Family, I Love a Mystery, Adventures by Morse).
- Juan Jesús Posadas Ocampo, 66, Mexican Roman Catholic cardinal, shot.

=== 25 ===
- Lee Roy Abernathy, 79, American gospel musician (A Wonderful Time Up There).
- Ajahn Buddhadasa, 86, Thai Buddhist monk and philosopher, cerebral hemorrhage.
- Poul Cederquist, 76, Danish Olympic hammer thrower (1948, 1952).
- Laura Conti, 72, Italian anti-fascist partisan, politician, feminist, and novelist.
- Louis O. Coxe, 75, American writer, playwright, and professor.
- Rudolf Eckstein, 78, German rower and Olympic champion (1936).
- Vincent Eri, 56, Papua New Guinean politician and novelist.
- Kimon Friar, 81, Greek-American poet and translator.
- D. J. Peterson, 33, American professional wrestler, motorcycle accident.
- Flip Regout, 77, Dutch Olympic rower (1936).
- John Scott, 58, Australian Olympic sailor (1956).
- Dan Seymour, 78, American actor (To Have and Have Not, Key Largo, Mara Maru), complications from a stroke.
- Horia Sima, 86, Romanian politician and war criminal.

=== 26 ===
- Catherine Caradja, 100, Romanian aristocrat and philanthropist.
- Cor de Groot, 78, Dutch pianist and composer.
- Tsola Dragoycheva, 94, Bulgarian communist politician.
- Francis Lund Van Dusen, 81, American judge.
- Fernando Lopez, 89, Filipino politician.
- Memos Makris, 80, Greek sculptor.
- George Perpich, 72, American football player (Baltimore Colts).
- Jack Priestley, 66, American cinematographer.
- Joseph Pulitzer, Jr., 80, American publisher (St. Louis Post-Dispatch), colon cancer.
- Jan Wiley, 77, American actress (She-Wolf of London, A Fig Leaf for Eve, The Brute Man), cancer.
- Ulvi Yenal, 85, Turkish Olympic footballer (1928) and businessman (Turkish Airlines).

=== 27 ===
- Tony Del Monaco, 57, Italian pop singer and actor.
- Joe Gormley, Baron Gormley, 75, British trade unionist.
- Serge Leroy, 56, French film director (Le mataf, The Track, The Passengers).
- Roger MacDougall, 82, Scottish screenwriter and playwright.
- Werner Stocker, 38, German actor, brain cancer.

=== 28 ===
- Tatari Ali, 64, Nigerian politician, governor of Bauchi State (1979–1983), heart failure.
- Charlie Barnett, 82, English cricketer.
- Duncan Browne, 46, English singer-songwriter and musician, cancer.
- William Collins, 61, Canadian Olympic canoeist (1956).
- Fats Dantonio, 74, American baseball player (Brooklyn Dodgers).
- George Faust, 75, American football player (Chicago Cardinals).
- Bobby Joe Green, 57, American gridiron football player (Pittsburgh Steelers, Chicago Bears), heart attack.
- Derek Hersey, 36, British rock climber, climbing accident.
- Ugo Locatelli, 77, Italian football player and Olympian (1936).
- Doctor Ross, 67, American blues musician, and one-man band.

=== 29 ===
- Billy Conn, 75, American light heavyweight boxing champion.
- Alex Kampouris, 80, American baseball player.
- Paul Malvern, 90, American film producer, child actor, and stuntman.
- Louise McManus, 97, American nurse and academic.
- Rahima Moosa, 70, South African politician and activist.

=== 30 ===
- Qamar Ajnalvi, 73, Pakistani novelist.
- Takeharu Asō, 93, Japanese Olympic cross-country skier (1928).
- H. Gordon Barrett, 77, Canadian politician, member of the House of Commons of Canada (1968-1972).
- Gonzalo Barrios, 91, Venezuelan politician.
- Ted Garrett, 73, British politician.
- Lien Gisolf, 82, Dutch high jumper and Olympic medalist (1928, 1932).
- Henry Heerup, 85, Danish painter, graphic artist and sculptor.
- Les Hill, 77, Australian rules footballer.
- Marge, 88, American cartoonist (Little Lulu), lymphoma.
- Melvin Spencer Newman, 85, American chemist, Ohio State University professor.
- Sun Ra, 79, American jazz composer, bandleader, pianist, and poet, congestive heart failure. .
- Mel Rees, 26, Welsh football player, cancer.
- Gil Reese, 92, American gridiron football player.
- Solly Yach, 65, South African Olympic water polo player (1952).

=== 31 ===
- Falkner Allison, 86, English Anglican prelate, Bishop of Chelmsford (1951–1961) and Winchester (1961–1974).
- Tolly Burnett, 69, English cricketer.
- Honey Tree Evil Eye, 9, American bull terrier, portrayer of Spuds MacKenzie, kidney failure.
- Jimmy Hill, 74, American baseball player.
- Matti Karumaa, 68, Finnish ice hockey player and Olympian (1952).
- Mabel McKay, 86, Native American basketweaver and artist.
- John Litchfield, 89, British Royal Navy officer and politician.
- Donn Tatum, 80, American businessman (Walt Disney Productions), cancer.
- Joseph E. Vogler, 80, American politician, homicide.
