= Red and Blue =

Red and Blue may refer to:

- Red and Blue (album), a 1983 album by Cee Farrow
- Pokémon Red and Blue, role-playing games developed by Game Freak and published by Nintendo for the Game Boy
- "The Red and Blue", a popular song at the University of Pennsylvania
- The Red and the Blue (film), a 2012 Italian film
- The Red and the Blue (TV series), a 1976 Italian animated children's series
- "The Red and the Blue" (Cold Case), a 2006 television episode
- The Red and the Blue: The 1990s and the Birth of Political Tribalism, a 2018 book by Steve Kornacki
- Red & Blue, a former program on CBS News (streaming service)
- Red and Blue Bowl, an annual football match between York University and the University of Toronto in Canada

== See also ==
- "Blue and Red", a song by ManuElla
- Red vs. Blue, animated web series by Rooster Teeth
- Red and Blue Chair, designed in 1917 by Gerrit Rietveld
- Red states and blue states, the states of the United States carried by Republican or Democratic presidential candidates, respectively
- Red team
- Blue team
