= Yach =

Yach is both a given name and surname. Notable people with the name include:

- Yach Bol (born 1997), South Sudanese footballer
- Derek Yach (born 1955), South African businessman
- Solly Yach (1927–1993), South African water polo player

== See also ==
- Yach is an urban district of Elzach, Germany
