= Blue Team =

Blue Team may refer to:

- Blue Team (Czech politics) (Modrý tým), a Civic Democratic Party (ODS) project, active 2009-2015
- Blue Team, the "friendly" side in a wargame/military simulation; see red team (the adversary), in military doctrine
- Blue team (computer security), defending an infrastructure against cyberattacks
- Blue Team (U.S. politics), the US anti-People's Republic of China political lobby
- Blue Team (bridge) (Squadra azzurra), the Italian bridge team, from the mid-1950s to the mid-1970s
- the NASA Mission Control team, headed by flight director John Hodge as of 1963
- the Italy national American football team, nicknamed "Blue Team" (il Blue Team)
- Blue Team, an X-Men strike force
- a sub-unit of the SPARTAN special-ops forces in the Halo universe, especially in the Red vs. Blue series
- Intel, an American technology company (with respect to the color of its logo)

== See also ==
- Azzurri (literally: the Blue, nickname for several Italian national teams)
