= Devil's Advocate Unit =

Israeli military intelligence unit

The Devil's Advocate Unit (Hebrew: מחלקת הבקרה, Makhleket HaBakara – lit. "the comptroller department")" is a small unit in the Israeli Military Intelligence Directorate. Its purpose is to evaluate intelligence assumptions and products in a professional and critical manner, including serving as the "Devil's advocate" or the "Ifcha Mistabra" (Aramaic - lit. "appears to be the opposite") function. This means examining unlikely scenarios and questioning common assumptions of the Research Department as well as proposing adversarial evaluations. The unit works as an independent part of the Research Department.

The Devil's Advocate Unit was founded after the Yom Kippur War as part of the implementation of the Agranat Commission recommendations. The head of the unit is a Colonel (Aluf Mishne) that operates directly under the head of Military Intelligence Directorate and not under the head of the Research Department. Notable previous heads of this unit are Yaakov Amidror and Amos Gilad. In 2008, the head of the unit was quoted as saying that there are not many cases where the Devil's Advocate evaluation turned out to hold. An exception is Israel's withdrawal from Lebanon. Intelligence evaluations predicted Gog and Magog in the north, and the unit has said that Hezbollah will keep things quiet, which turned out to be mostly the case until 2006.

A plot element in the 2006 novel World War Z (as well as in the 2013 film adaption) is based upon the Israeli Devil's Advocate Office.

In 2024 it was revealed that the unit tried repeatedly to warn of a possible Hamas attack before the 7 October 2023 attack, writing directly to all senior decision-makers in the army and the political echelon on September 21 and 26, 2023.
