= Postulator =

Person who guides a cause for beatification or canonization

A postulator is the person who guides a cause for beatification or canonization through the judicial processes required by the Catholic Church. The qualifications, role and function of the postulator are spelled out in the Norms to be Observed in Inquiries made by Bishops in the Causes of Saints, which has been in effect since 7 February 1983. A petitioner seeking the beatification may appoint as postulator anyone, cleric or not, who is an expert in theological, canonical and historical matters, and versed in the practice of the Congregation for the Causes of Saints, subject to the approval of the bishop. The major religious orders, such as the Franciscans, Dominicans and Jesuits, appoint members of their orders as postulators-general who are available to act for petitioners in causes and who develop reputations as experts in their field. The later stage of a cause requires the postulator to reside in Rome, which also favors the assignment of the postulator's role to such a postulator-general, since most religious orders maintain their headquarters in Rome.

== Duties of the postulator ==
The first duty of the postulator is to conduct thorough investigations into the life of the candidate for beatification. The postulator also has responsibility for administering funds collected for the cause. Like all officials who take part in a cause, the postulator is obliged to take an oath to fulfil his duty and to observe the strictest confidentiality.

== Role of the postulator ==
A postulator, instructed by the petitioner, initiates a cause by presenting to the bishop of the diocese where the candidate for beatification died, a written petition with supporting documentation. The documentation must include (i) a biography of the candidate, or at least a chronology of his life, indicating the heroic virtue and sanctity of life or the martyrdom that justifies beatification; (ii) authentic copies of all the candidate's writings; and (iii) in recent cases, a list of those persons who can help "bring to light the truth about the virtues or the martyrdom of the [candidate], and about his or her reputation of sanctity or of signs [i.e., miracles]." The bishop decides whether to accept the petition. If accepted, the cause must be discussed with the bishops of neighboring dioceses and publicized so that anyone with relevant information might come forward and make it known. The candidate's writings are examined to see if they present theological difficulties. If problems or obstacles emerge, the postulator is given an opportunity to resolve them. Once the way is clear for the cause to proceed, the bishop will initiate the diocesan inquiry stage of the process, which is divided into two separate areas of investigation: the inquiry into heroic virtue or martyrdom; and the inquiry into "signs" or miracles, normally medical in nature, that are attributed to the intercession of the candidate. The postulator identifies the relevant witnesses, but is not allowed to testify while serving as postulator. When the bishop or his delegate has completed these inquiries, the postulator has the right to examine the official record and supplement it as he needs to. The transcript of the inquiry with all relevant documentation is sent to the Congregation for the Causes of Saints. The postulator must reside in Rome for the further consideration of the cause.

== See also ==
- Devil's advocate
