= Imagination (Cee Farrow song) =

- Artwork for CD single

Single by Cee Farrow
- B-side: "Imagination (Dance Mix)", "(Euro Mix)", "(Instrumental)"
- Released: 14 March 1991
- Recorded: 1991
- Genre: Eurodance, synthpop, electronic
- Length: 4:04
- Label: Graphite Records
- Songwriter(s): Cee Farrow, Phil Maturano
- Producer(s): Mars Lasar

Cee Farrow singles chronology
"Wildlife Romance" (1983)	"Imagination" (1991)

"Imagination" is a song from the German singer Cee Farrow, released on 23 August 1991 as a non-album single. It was written by Farrow, Phil Maturano and The Company, and produced by Mars Lasar. "Imagination" was Farrow's first release since his 1983 debut album Red and Blue, which had spawned the minor hit single "Should I Love You".

== Background ==
Recorded in 1991, "Imagination" was an attempt at a comeback for Farrow, after his original record label in 1983, Rocshire Records, had suffered legal problems and all its assets, including master tapes were seized. Farrow withdrew from music and reportedly opened his own nightclub around 1987, named The Bitter End.

Released by the independent record label Graphite Records, "Imagination" saw Farrow team up with Mars Larsar, Phil Maturano and The Company. "Imagination" was recorded at Echo Sound Recording and engineered by Eric Scheda. It was Farrow's only release on the label, which also manufactured and distributed the single. The song was not a commercial success. In May 1993, Farrow died in West Hollywood, California from a brain disease attributed to AIDS.

== Release ==
The single was released in America only on 12" vinyl, cassette and CD. On the 12" vinyl, the A-side featured "Imagination (Dance Mix)" while the B-side was "Imagination (Instrumental)". Both the cassette and CD version of the single featured the main track and three remixes.

A total of three remixes were created for the single, the "Dance Mix", "Euro Mix" and "Instrumental Mix". "Imagination (Dance Mix)" lasts over six minutes and features a more dominant use of percussion as well as some spoken vocal, based on the song's lyrics, performed by Farrow, and exclusive to the remix. "Imagination (Euro Mix)" features an alternative backing keyboard melody and piano, as well as a different vocal take, instead of the original version's vocal. The ending features the lyric "Hear what I say" which was not used in the original version. "Imagination (Instrumental Mix)" is the same remix as the "Dance Mix" but minus all lead vocal, leaving only some backing vocal in places.

== Music video ==
A music video was filmed to promote the single. It was Farrow's second and final music video, with his first being for his 1983 minor hit single "Should I Love You".

The video features Farrow performing the song on a stage in a nightclub venue, where backing musicians are also featured in parts, as well as dancers. Farrow himself goes between two different appearances, one in a black suit and another in a red jacket with a black undercoat that features crosses on it.

== Critical reception ==
Upon release, Billboard said: "Techno-pop ditty benefits from Farrow's rich, Bryan Ferry-like vocal and hook that would do well in both club and alternative radio formats. Tribal percussion and subversive funk guitar riffs keep things moving along quite nicely."

== Track listing ==
12" single

1. "Imagination (Dance Mix)" - 6:18
2. "Imagination (Instrumental)" - 6:18

Cassette single

1. "Imagination" - 4:04
2. "Imagination (Dance Mix)" - 6:18
3. "Imagination (Euro Mix)" - 4:21
4. "Imagination (Instrumental)" - 6:18

CD single

1. "Imagination" - 4:06
2. "Imagination (Dance Mix)" - 6:20
3. "Imagination (Euro Mix)" - 4:22
4. "Imagination (Instrumental)" - 6:18

== Personnel ==
- Cee Farrow - vocals
- Brent Wroten - percussion
- Mars Lasar - producer, remixing
- The Company - co-producer
- Norbert Thorman - photography
