= Gazit Institute =

Israeli research institute

Gazit Institute Gazit Institute מכון גזית
- Logo of Gazit Institute

Agency overview
- Employees: Classified

Jurisdictional structure
- National agency: Israel
- Operations jurisdiction: Israel
- Governing body: Research Department (Aman)

Operational structure
- Agency executive: Col (res.) David Sternberg

Website
- Gazit's Official Website

The Gazit Institute is an Israeli research institute. The institute is part of the research department unit of Aman. It is named after the former head of Aman, Major General Shlomo Gazit.

== History ==
An initial reference to the institute was made at a memorial event commemorating Shlomo Gazit in June 2021. The institute was created in partnership with Rafael and was formally inaugurated in December 2021 at a ceremony presided over by the Director of Military Intelligence (Aman), Maj. Gen Aharon Haliva, the CEO of Rafael, Maj. Gen (res.) Yoav Har Even, and the head of the Intelligence Directorate's Research and Analysis Division, Brig. Gen. Amit Saar.

== Activities and goals ==
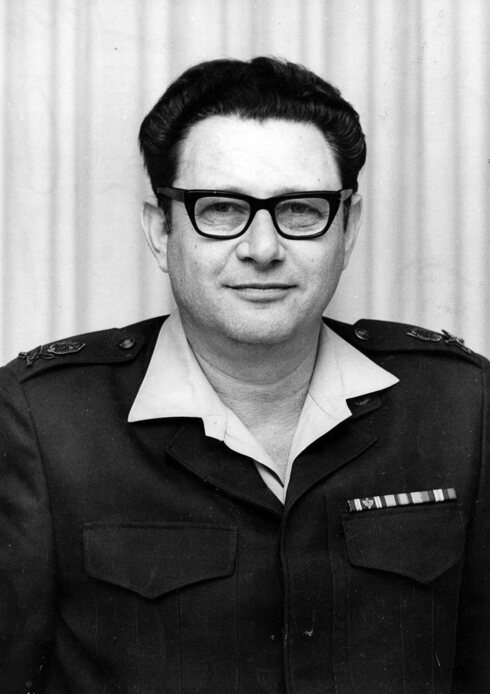
Shlomo Gazit

The Institute combines knowledge and concepts from the civilian realm with information and needs emerging in the intelligence community, bringing this combination to bear on complex problems with the help of researchers from different fields and advanced technologies in the scientific domains. The institute is composed of teams of senior researchers hailing from a variety of fields spanning the social sciences, humanities, and hard sciences, and working on issues of strategic intelligence such as foreign relations, force build-up, regime stability, demographics, society, economics and psychology. The institute's partnership with Rafael stems from the latter's extensive experience in the worlds of data science and advanced technologies. The Institute addresses multi-regional and long-term intelligence questions, but also deals with more immediate policy and operational issues. In a hearing convened by the Knesset's Foreign Affairs and Defense Committee in November 2021, the institute's director, Col (res.) David Sternberg, noted that the institute will enable the IDF's Intelligence Directorate (Aman) to address the impact of climate change on the region and on a range of issues such as the stability of states, Great Power competition, battlefield dynamics, and force build-up in the intelligence arena – all while making use of advanced capabilities such as simulations.

During the "Iron Swords" War, the Institute published a comprehensive and classified report analyzing the roots of Hamas's particularly cruel brutality exhibited in its attack of October 7. According to the report, the brutality carried out by the group's terrorists was not the result of a spontaneous eruption of rage but rather planned, intentional, and systematic.

== Conferences ==
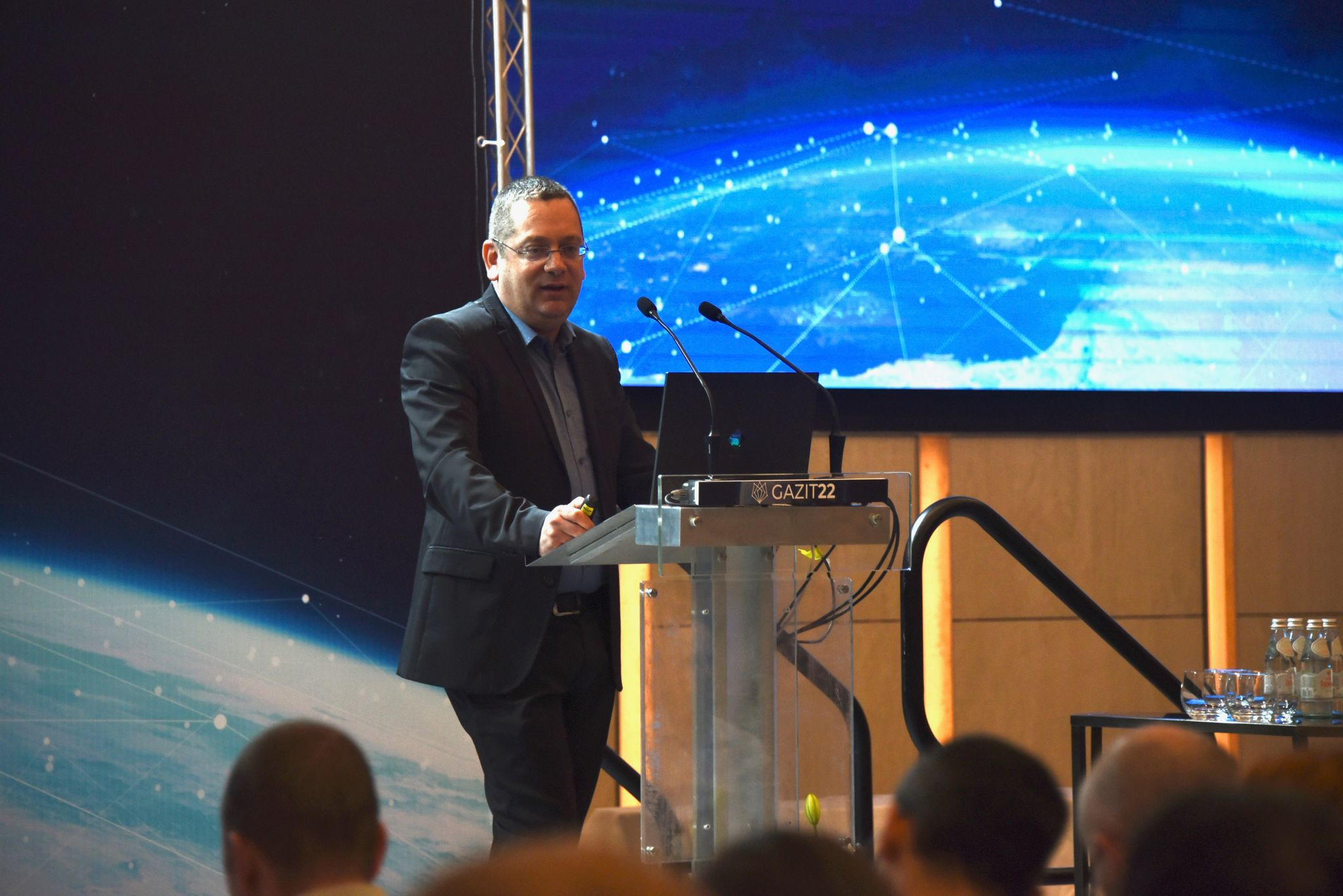
Col (res.) David Sternberg, CEO of Gazit Institute at the first annual Gazit conference.

In July 2022 the Institute hosted its first conference, addressing the role of intelligence research and operations in long-term thinking (a decade or more). Among the conference participants were a number of high-level officials from the defense establishment, including the Deputy Chief of the General Staff, the head of the Defense Ministry's Directorate of Defense Research & Development, and leaders in the private and public sectors.

In December 2022 the Gazit Institute convened its first annual conference around the theme "The Intelligence-Strategy-Technology Nexus". Featured speakers at the conference included the IDF Chief of the General Staff, the Head of the National Security Council, the Commanders of Units 8200 and 9900, respectively, and former Prime Minister of Israel Ehud Barak. The conference also featured the first-ever public presentation of an unclassified version of Israeli Defense Intelligence's (IDI) annual intelligence assessment by the Head of IDI's Research and Analysis Division, Brig. Gen. Amit Saar.
