= Amit Saar =

Israeli military intelligence officer (1978–2026)

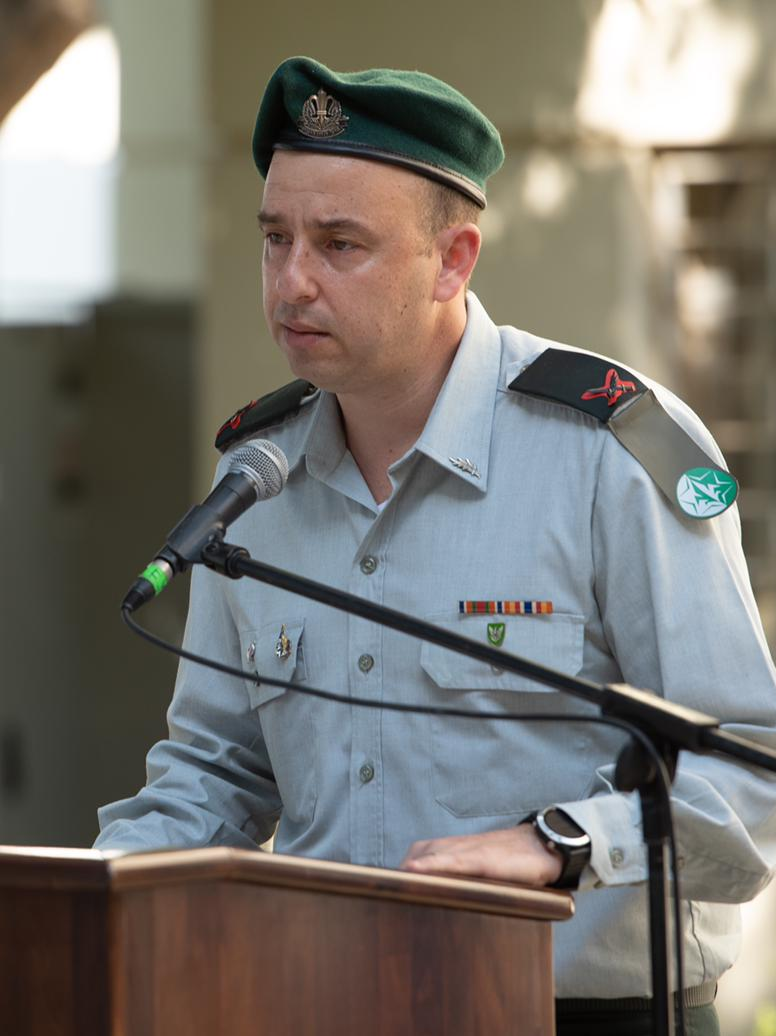
- Saar in 2020
- Native name: עמית סער
- Born: 1978; Haifa, Israel
- Died: January 1, 2026 (aged 47) Israel
- Buried: Kiryat Shaul Cemetery
- Allegiance: Israel
- Branch: Military Intelligence Directorate
- Service years: 1996–2024
- Rank: Brigadier general
- Commands: Military Intelligence Research

Amit Saar (Hebrew: עמית סער; 1978 – January 1, 2026) was an Israeli intelligence officer who led the Military Intelligence Research Department from 2020 to 2024. He held various positions within the Israeli intelligence community prior to becoming Israel's top intelligence evaluator.

While in charge of the Research Department, Saar warned prime minister Benjamin Netanyahu of a potential attack by Israel's enemies due to domestic turmoil caused by the 2023 judicial reform protests. However, he failed to predict the October 7 attacks by Hamas, and is widely held accountable for the intelligence failures that enabled the attack. After indicating that he would step down from his position over his responsibility for the attacks, he resigned in April 2024 following a cancer diagnosis.

== Early life and education ==
Amit Saar was born in Haifa in 1978. He joined the Israel Defense Forces' (IDF) Academic Reserve in 1996, studying at the Hebrew University of Jerusalem for a bachelor's degree in Middle Eastern studies and philosophy. He later traveled to the United States, where he graduated from Brandeis University with a master's degree in international conflict resolution. He underwent another year of studies in 2017 at the National Security College, and graduated with a master's in political science from the University of Haifa.

== Intelligence career ==
Saar first joined the Intelligence Corps, serving in the Jordan Research Section. He was promoted to lieutenant colonel in 2010, concurrently being appointed to head the Research Division's regional and international arena. The following year, Military Intelligence Directorate (Aman) commander Aviv Kohavi appointed Saar as his personal intelligence assistant. In 2013, he was appointed chief of the IDF's Intelligence Unit, holding this position during the 2014 Gaza War.

In 2015, he was promoted to colonel and took leadership of the Palestine area of the Research Division. He was chosen to head the Southern Command's intelligence department in 2018, holding this position during the November 2019 Gaza–Israel clashes.

=== Head of the Research Department ===
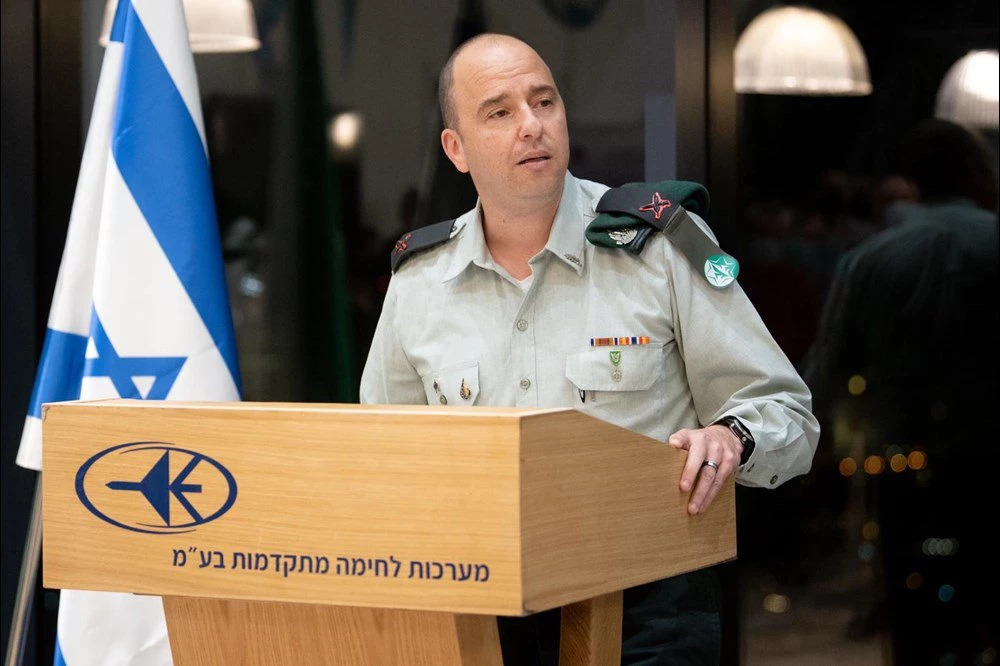
Saar at a ceremony marking the establishment of the Gazit Institute, December 14, 2021

Saar was promoted to brigadier general and appointed as head of Aman's research department in October 2020, a role considered Israel's top intelligence evaluator. He gave an interview to Walla! in 2022, calling the Gaza Strip under Hamas a "chronic problem" with no solution. He added, "To all those who want to go in and conquer Gaza, no one wants to stay in Gaza. You can conquer Gaza, but then there is one small problem: you are left with Gaza. No one wants that. Everyone has learned that it is better not to." Speaking of the 2022 Mahsa Amini protests in Iran, he told the Gazit Institute that, "The repressive Iranian regime will, it seems, manage to survive these protests," as Iran has created "very, very strong tools" to manage such protests, but they would cause a years-long problem for the Iranian government in the future.

Before the Gaza war broke out in October 2023, Saar was seen as a "brilliant analyst" who could accurately predict trends within Iran, Hezbollah, and Hamas. Prior to the 7 October attacks, he sent four letters to prime minister Benjamin Netanyahu in March and July 2023 warning that with domestic tensions caused by protests against Netanyahu's judicial reform plan, Iran, Hezbollah, and Hamas saw Israel "in a blistering, unprecedented crisis threatening its cohesion" that they could exploit "to create the perfect storm". He wrote a total of four letters to Netanyahu, which he ignored. The fourth letter was scheduled to be sent after October 7. One of the letters prompted a speech by then-defense minister Yoav Gallant speaking out against Netanyahu's judicial reform. Netanyahu fired Gallant in response, but reversed his decision due to public backlash.

Despite his warnings, Saar failed to foresee the October 7 attacks. He believed that Hamas had been weakened and deterred from a conflict with Israel, and he mainly focused on the threat of Hezbollah. Four days before the attacks, he released an assessment that Hamas was rebuilding at a "moderate slope" but was still weakened due to the destruction of its tunnels. On the night leading up to the attacks, he was awoken at 3:30 a.m. local time with intelligence that Hamas operatives had activated Israeli SIM cards on their phones. At the time, he did not realize that this indicated an imminent attack.

Saar is seen as one of the officials bearing the most responsibility for Israel's intelligence failure that enabled the attacks. He acknowledged his responsibility for the attacks, and admitted to not being aware of documents detailing Hamas's "Walls of Jericho" invasion plan, uncovered by Unit 8200, which described the assault executed on October 7. In a December 2023 interview with Haaretz journalist Amos Harel, Saar said that "The main reason I stayed on was to understand how and when Yahya Sinwar pulled the wool over my eyes", referring to when Sinwar decided to enter a large-scale conflict rather than limited clashes. In a later analysis, Saar believed that Hamas's change of strategy began in 2021, when Sinwar and Hamas military leader Mohammed Deif saw success in the May 2021 Israel–Palestine crisis, not only surviving the air war but encouraging thousands of Arab Israelis to clash with police within Israel.

In March 2024, Saar announced that he would resign from his position after the IDF released its probes into the October 7 attacks, which were scheduled for June. He resigned and retired from the IDF in April after being diagnosed with cancer, although his role was due to end regardless in the summer.

== Personal life ==
Saar had a wife and three children.

=== Illness and death ===
A few months into the Gaza war, Saar began experiencing headaches, and a malignant tumor was discovered in his head. He was diagnosed with brain cancer in 2024 and began undergoing treatment. He made several trips to the United States for special treatment, and returned to Israel in late November 2025 after his condition worsened. His condition rapidly deteriorated in the hours leading to his death, and he died on January 1, 2026, at the age of 47.

Saar was buried at the Kiryat Shaul military cemetery on January 2.
