= Computer room =

Computer room may refer to:

- Computer lab
- Data center, a facility used to house computer systems
- Internet cafe, a public place where people can access Internet
- Server room, a room that houses computer servers
- Telecentre, a public place in developing countries where people can access Internet

or, a room in a building (especially, a house or apartment) set-up around the use of a personal computer; an office.
