= Azzurre =

Azzurre (pronounced [adˈdzurre]) is the nickname for women's national sport teams in Italy:

- Italy women's national basketball team
- Italy women's national beach handball team
- Italy women's national football team
- Italy women's national volleyball team

== See also ==
- Azzurri (disambiguation)
- Azzurro (disambiguation)
