= Devil's advocate =

Figure of speech and former official position within the Catholic Church

The advocatus diaboli (Latin for Devil's advocate) is the common name for the official position within the Catholic Church of the Promoter of the Faith. It is defined as one who "argued against the canonization (sainthood) of a candidate to uncover any character flaws or misrepresentation of the evidence favoring canonization". It was reformed in 1984.

In common parlance, the phrase "playing devil's advocate" describes a situation where someone, given a certain point of view, takes a position they do not necessarily agree with (or simply an alternative position from the accepted norm), for the sake of debate or to explore the thought further using valid reasoning that both disagrees with the subject at hand and proves their own point valid. Despite being medieval in origin, this idiomatic expression is one of the most popular present-day English idioms used to express the concept of arguing against something without actually being committed to the contrary view. Playing devil's advocate is considered a form of the Socratic method.

== Origin and history ==
During the canonization process employed by the Catholic Church, the 'Promoter of the Faith' (Latin: promotor fidei), popularly known as the Devil's advocate (advocatus diaboli), was a canon lawyer appointed by Church authorities to argue against the canonization of a candidate. It was this person's job to take a skeptical view of the candidate's character, to look for holes in the evidence, to argue that any miracles attributed to the candidate were fraudulent, and so on. The Devil's advocate opposed 'God's advocate' (advocatus Dei; also known as the 'Promoter of the Cause'), whose task was to make the argument in favor of canonization. During the investigation of a cause, this task is now performed by the 'Promoter of Justice' (promotor iustitiae), who is in charge of examining the accuracy of the inquiry on the saintliness of the candidate. The Promoter of the Faith remains a figure in the Dicastery of the Causes of Saints and is also known as the Prelate Theologian.

The office was established in 1587 during the reign of Pope Sixtus V. The first formal mention of such an officer is found in the canonization of St Lawrence Justinian under Pope Leo X (1513–1521). Pope John Paul II reduced the power and changed the role of the office in 1983. In cases of controversy, the Vatican may still seek to solicit the testimony of critics of a candidate for canonization. One notable example of this was in 2003, when author Christopher Hitchens, an atheist and outspoken critic of Mother Teresa, was interviewed as part of her beatification hearings.

== Effectiveness ==
Psychologist Charlan Jeanne Nemeth writes that inauthentic dissent (assigning someone to act as a Devil's advocate) is considerably less effective in improving group decision-making than authentic dissent. She also writes that inauthentic dissent can cause people to become more entrenched in their original beliefs, the opposite of the intended purpose e.g. in businesses that use this technique.

== See also ==
- Dialectic
- Dissoi logoi
- Lawsuits against the Devil
- Murder board
- Polemic
- Red team
- Roman Rota
- Social gadfly
- Socratic method
- Steelmanning
