= Azzurri =

Azzurri (Italian: [adˈdzurri]) may refer to:

== Sports teams and clubs ==
- Nickname for several Italian national teams:
  - Italy national football team
  - Italy national basketball team
  - Italy national rugby league team
  - Italy national rugby union team
  - Italy men's national ice hockey team
  - Italy men's national volleyball team
  - Italy men's national flag football team
  - Italy national athletics team
  - Italy national cycling team
  - Italy national cricket team
  - Italy national baseball team
  - Italy national alpine ski team aka Valanga azzurra (men) or Valanga rosa (women)
- S.S.C. Napoli, an Italian professional football team
- Empoli FC, an Italian professional football team
- Azzurri Sports Club, home to the Adelaide Blue Eagles, an Australian football team
- Charlestown Azzurri FC an Australian football club based in Newcastle, New South Wales

== Other uses ==
- Azzurri d'Italia classification, a points classification in the Giro d'Italia cycle race
- Azzurri Group, parent company of casual dining brand Ask Italian

== See also ==
- Azzurre (disambiguation)
- Azzurro (disambiguation)
- Blueshirts (Italian Nationalist Association)
