= Azzurro (disambiguation) =

- "Azzurro" is an Italian pop song.

Azzurro may also refer to:

- Azzuro (film), 2000 film
- Porto Azzurro, a municipality on the island of Elba
- MS Golfo Azzurro, a North Sea trawler

== See also ==
- Azzurri (disambiguation), the Italian plural form of azzurro, light blue
