= Eddie Cranage =

Australian rules footballer, born 1917

Personal information
- Full name: Eddie Cranage
- Born: 12 June 1917
- Died: 7 May 1993 (aged 75)
- Height: 187 cm (6 ft 2 in)
- Weight: 79 kg (174 lb)

Playing career^{1}
Years	Club	Games (Goals)
1940	St Kilda	4 (0)
- ^{1} Playing statistics correct to the end of 1940.

Eddie Cranage (12 June 1917 – 7 May 1993) was an Australian rules footballer who played with St Kilda in the Victorian Football League (VFL).
