= Joe Churchman =

Australian rules footballer

Personal information
- Full name: Ernest William Churchman
- Born: 18 September 1924; Portsmouth, Hampshire, England
- Died: 9 May 1993 (aged 68); Western Australia
- Height: 185 cm (6 ft 1 in)
- Weight: 80 kg (176 lb)

Playing career^{1}
Years	Club	Games (Goals)
1949	Hawthorn	3 (0)
- ^{1} Playing statistics correct to the end of 1949.

Ernest William "Joe" Churchman (18 September 1924 – 9 May 1993) was an Australian rules footballer who played with Hawthorn in the Victorian Football League (VFL). Winner of Hayward medal playing for South Bunbury football club 1952
