= Les Hill (footballer) =

Australian rules footballer (1916–1993)

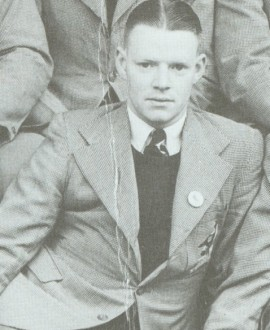
- Hill during his Collingwood career

Personal information
- Full name: Albert Leslie Hill
- Born: 19 April 1916; Fitzroy North, Victoria
- Died: 30 May 1993 (aged 77)
- Original team: Carlton Brewery
- Height: 175 cm (5 ft 9 in)
- Weight: 80.5 kg (177 lb)

Playing career^{1}
Years	Club	Games (Goals)
1939–40	Collingwood	13 (1)
1941–44	Fitzroy	52 (4)
1947	North Melbourne	2 (0)
Total		67 (5)
- ^{1} Playing statistics correct to the end of 1947.

Albert Leslie Hill (19 April 1916 – 30 May 1993) was an Australian rules footballer who played with Collingwood, Fitzroy and North Melbourne in the Victorian Football League (VFL). He went to Terang as coach in 1948.
