= Yach Bol =

South Sudanese footballer

Personal information
- Full name: Yach Mayom Bol
- Date of birth: 29 March 1997 (age 29)
- Place of birth: Turalei, Sudan (now South Sudan)
- Position: Midfielder

Team information
- Current team: Geelong

Senior career*
| Years | Team | Apps | (Gls) |
| 2015 | Brunswick City | | |
| 2016 | Green Gully | | |
| 2017 | Eastern Lions | | |
| 2018 | Western Suburbs | | |
| 2019– | Geelong | | |

International career^{‡}
| 2019– | South Sudan | 4 | (0) |
- * Club domestic league appearances and goals ‡ National team caps and goals as of 17 November 2020

Yach Mayom Bol (born 29 March 1997) is a South Sudanese footballer who plays as a midfielder for Australian club Geelong SC and the South Sudan national team.
