= Pete Sunkett =

American baseball player

- Pitcher
- Born: March 28, 1918; Melfa, Virginia, U.S.
- Died: May 9, 1993 (aged 75); Cherry Hill, New Jersey, U.S.
- Batted: Right Threw: Right

Negro league baseball debut
- 1943, for the Philadelphia Stars

Last appearance
- 1945, for the Philadelphia Stars

Teams
- Philadelphia Stars (1943–1945)

Golden Leroy Sunkett Jr. (March 28, 1918 – May 9, 1993), nicknamed "Pete", was an American Negro league pitcher in the 1940s.

A native of Melfa, Virginia, Sunkett played for the Philadelphia Stars from 1943 to 1945. Following his baseball career, he served as a police detective in Camden, New Jersey. Sunkett died in Cherry Hill, New Jersey in 1993 at age 75.
