= Should I Love You =

Single by Cee Farrow

from the album Red and Blue
- B-side: "Paint It Blue"
- Released: 1983
- Recorded: 1982
- Genre: New wave, synthpop
- Length: 4:00
- Label: Rochshire Records
- Songwriters: Cee Farrow, Lothar Krell
- Producer: Andy Lunn

Cee Farrow singles chronology
"Should I Love You" (1983)	"Don't Ask Why" (1983)

"Should I Love You" is a song by the German singer Cee Farrow, released in 1983 as the lead single from his debut album Red and Blue. It was written by Farrow and Lothar Krell, and produced by Andy Lunn. Released in North America only, the single reached No. 82 on the Billboard Hot 100 and remained in the charts for six weeks.

== Background ==
Having signed with Rocshire Records, Farrow recorded his debut album, Red and Blue, between March and December 1982 at Hotline Studios. Released in 1983, "Should I Love You" was issued as the first single from the album. It became a minor hit in October 1983 when it peaked at No. 82 on the Billboard Hot 100. It also reached No. 91 on the Billboard Hot Black Singles Chart. Although "Don't Ask Why" was released as the follow-up, it failed to chart, as did the Red and Blue album.

Shortly after the single and album's release, Rocshire began suffering legal issues when it was discovered that Rocshire had been financed by millions of dollars that Rocky Davis' wife, Shirley Davis, had embezzled from Hughes Aircraft while working as an accountant there. U.S. Federal Marshalls seized all of the label's assets, including master tapes, in January 1984. Farrow stepped away from the music business, but later made an attempt at a comeback with the 1991 single "Imagination". He died in 1993 in West Hollywood, California of a brain disease attributed to AIDS.

== Release ==
"Should I Love You" was released in the United States and Canada only on 7" and 12" vinyl. The B-side, "Paint It Blue", was taken from Red and Blue and written solely by Farrow. In addition to the main 7" release, a promotional 7" vinyl was also released in the US. A 12" vinyl, released commercially and as a promotional release, featured an extended version of "Should I Love You", lasting a duration of over seven minutes, on both sides of the vinyl.

== Music video ==
An accompanying music video was filmed to promote the single. It was shot at Carthay Studios in Los Angeles by director and producer Mark Robinson. The video features Farrow performing the song with backing musicians, as well as footage of Farrow in a restaurant where a woman, sat with an older man, cannot help but notice Farrow. As the video progresses, the older man gets more suspicious, to the point where he reveals his cane to actually be a sword weapon. The music video was given light rotation on MTV.

== Critical reception ==
Upon release, Billboard listed the song as a recommended pop single under their "Top Single Picks" of June 11, 1983.

== Track listing ==
7" single

1. "Should I Love You" - 4:00
2. "Paint It Blue" - 4:55

7" single (US promo)

1. "Should I Love You" - 4:00
2. "Paint It Blue" - 4:55

12" single (US release)

1. "Should I Love You" - 7:20
2. "Should I Love You" - 7:20

12" single (US promo)

1. "Should I Love You" - 7:20
2. "Should I Love You" - 7:20

== Chart performance ==
Chart (1983)	Peak position
U.S. Billboard Hot 100	82
U.S. Billboard R&B/Hip-Hop Songs Chart	91

== Personnel ==
- Cee Farrow – vocals
- Pave – guitar
- Peter Ponzol – saxophone, lyricon
- Lothar Krell – synthesizer, programming
- Ken Taylor – bass guitar
- Nick Name – drums
- Andy Lunn – producer, mixing, engineer
- Wolfgang Auer – executive producer
- Carmine Di, Jon Caffrey – engineers
- Mathias Dietrich – assistant engineer
