= Reginald Bryan =

English cricketer and soldier

Personal information
- Full name: Reginald Charles Peter Bryan
- Born: 29 January 1916; Lyndhurst, Hampshire, England
- Died: 9 May 1993 (aged 77); Hampshire, England
- Batting: Unknown
- Bowling: Unknown

Domestic team information
- Years: Team
- 1936/37: Europeans

Career statistics
Competition	First-class
Matches	1
Runs scored	52
Batting average	26.00
100s/50s	–/–
Top score	39
Balls bowled	120
Wickets	6
Bowling average	9.00
5 wickets in innings	1
10 wickets in match	–
Best bowling	6/54
Catches/stumpings	4/–
- Source: Cricinfo, 29 October 2023

Reginald Charles Peter Bryan MBE (29 January 1916 – 9 May 1993) was an English first-class cricketer and British Army officer.

Bryan was born in January 1916 at Lyndhurst, Hampshire. He was educated at Winchester College, before attending the Royal Military Academy, Woolwich. He graduated from there into the Royal Artillery (RA) as a second lieutenant. Whilst serving with the RA in British India, Bryan made a single appearance in first-class cricket for the Europeans cricket team against the Indians at Madras in the 1936–37 Madras Presidency Match. Opening the batting twice in the match, he was dismissed for 13 runs in the Europeans first innings by A. G. Ram Singh, while in their second innings he was dismissed for 39 runs by Gopalaswami Parthasarathi. With the ball, he took a five wicket haul in the Indians second innings, with figures of 6 for 54 from 20 overs. In the RA, he was promoted to lieutenant in January 1939, and served with the RA in the first sixteen months of the Second World War, before being placed on the half-pay list on account of ill-health in December 1940. On account of his ill-health, he was transferred to the Inter-Services Topographic Department. For his efforts with that organisation during the war, he was made an MBE in the 1946 New Year Honours. Bryan retired from active service in December 1945, on account of his ill-health. He died in Hampshire in May 1993.
