= Murder board =

Committee of questioners

A murder board, also known as a "scrub-down", is a committee of questioners set up to critically review a proposal and/or help someone prepare for a difficult oral examination.

The term originated in the U.S. military, specifically from the Pentagon, but has spread to academic and government appointment contexts. NASA contends the murder board was created by Hans Mark, Director of Ames Research Center from 1969 to 1977, derived from the earlier concept of the tiger team.

In highly risk-averse, technical endeavors where extreme efforts are taken to prevent mistakes (e.g. satellite operations), murder boards are used to aggressively review, without constraint or pleasantries, a situation's problem, assumptions, constraints, mitigations, and the proposed solution. The board's goal is to kill the well-prepared proposal on technical merit; holding back even the least suspicion of a problem is not tolerated. Such argumentative murder boards consist of many subject matter experts of the specific system under review and of all interfacing systems.

In project management, a murder board is a process where a committee asks questions from project representatives as part of the project selection process.

In U.S. politics, murder boards are used in preparing candidates for debates and presidential appointees for Senate confirmation hearings.

On April 20, 2010, representative Mary Jo Kilroy asked former Lehman Brothers CEO Dick Fuld if he had set up a murder board to prepare for his testimony before the House Financial Services Committee concerning the 2008 Lehman Brothers failure. Fuld expressed confusion at the expression, apparently unfamiliar with the term. Fuld indicated that he had not set up a murder board after Barney Frank explained what it meant.

== See also ==
- Red team
