= Joe Lukeman =

Australian rules footballer, born 1901

Personal information
- Full name: Joscelin Kethburt Lukeman
- Born: 16 August 1901; Kadina, South Australia
- Died: 3 May 1993 (aged 91)
- Original team: West Adelaide / Port Pirie
- Height: 183 cm (6 ft 0 in)
- Weight: 73 kg (161 lb)

Playing career^{1}
Years	Club	Games (Goals)
1928–29	Footscray	8 (0)
- ^{1} Playing statistics correct to the end of 1929.

Joscelin Kethburt "Joe" Lukeman (16 August 1901 – 3 May 1993) was an Australian rules footballer who played with Footscray in the Victorian Football League (VFL).
