= Taimi Mattsson =

Finnish fencer

Personal information
- Born: 25 June 1913 Helsinki, Finland
- Died: 5 May 1993 (aged 79) Helsinki, Finland

Sport
- Sport: Fencing

Taimi Mattsson (25 June 1913 – 5 May 1993) was a Finnish fencer. She competed in the women's individual foil event at the 1952 Summer Olympics.
