= Cee Farrow =

- Promotional photo for the 1991 single "Imagination"

Background information
- Born: Christian Frede Kruzinski; September 4, 1956; Frankfurt, West Germany
- Died: May 7, 1993 (aged 36) West Hollywood, California, U.S.
- Genres: New wave, synthpop
- Occupations: Singer, songwriter, model
- Years active: 1982–1991
- Labels: Rocshire Records, Graphite Records

Christian Frede Kruzinski (September 4, 1956 – May 7, 1993), better known also as Cee Farrow, was a new wave singer of the early 1980s.

== Background ==
Farrow was born in Frankfurt, West Germany. Originally a model, he was most noted for his debut single "Should I Love You", which peaked at no. 82 on the Billboard Hot 100 on October 22, 1983. The single also entered the R&B Singles chart on October 8, 1983, and peaked at no. 91. He released one full-length LP, titled Red and Blue, on the Rocshire label in 1983. The label suffered legal problems and all its assets, including master tapes, were seized. The album would not be officially re-issued on CD until May 2026.

In 1983, he was described as a fashion model, singer and underground actor. He was living in Paris at the time, where he also designed clothes, in addition to his music career, which saw him begin performing in clubs and shooting his music video for "Should I Love You" in Los Angeles area.

Farrow also designed over a dozen album covers for Rochshire and Graphite Records' artists, including his own debut album, the 1983 album The Boy Is Mine by Caro, and the 1984 album Stage Struck by Justine Johns.

In August 1984, he married April M. Gabrielle in Nevada. During the mid-to-late 1980s and early 1990s, Farrow and April, known by the name April La Rue, ran a series of nightclubs in the Los Angeles area. Among these were the Bitter End (1985), the Apartment (1988 to 1991) and Maxx (1992). He also ran, with Jeffrey Sanker, the Santa Monica Boulevard nightclub Arena in 1990.

In 1987, he was behind a video titled What About Love? which was shown in clubs around Los Angeles. Described as "controversial" by LA Weekly, Farrow said he wanted to show the "bad side of love" in the video. Farrow re-surfaced with a new single, "Imagination", in 1991 under the label Graphite Records, although it failed to gain any success. A music video was created for the single.

Farrow died on May 7, 1993, in West Hollywood, California, reportedly of a brain disease attributed to AIDS. He was cremated and his funeral was held at Greystone Manor in Los Angeles.

== Discography ==
=== Albums ===
- 1983: Red and Blue

=== Singles ===
- 1983: "Should I Love You" (Billboard Hot 100 No. 82, Hot R&B Songs No. 91)
- 1983: "Don't Ask Why"
- 1983: "Wildlife Romance" (Released as promotional 12" vinyl only)
- 1991: "Imagination"
