= Shmuel Gogol =

Israeli harmonica player (1924–1993)

Shmuel Gogol שמואל גוגול
- Born: 1924; Warsaw, Second Polish Republic
- Origin: Israel
- Died: 13 May 1993 (aged 69)
- Occupation: Musician
- Instrument: Harmonica

Shmuel Gogol (Hebrew: שמואל גוגול; 1924 – 13 May 1993) was a Polish-born Israeli musician who founded the Ramat Gan harmonica band after surviving the Holocaust.

== Biography ==
Gogol was born in Warsaw in 1924. After the death of his mother and his father's expulsion from Poland, he was raised by his grandmother. His grandmother took him to Janusz Korczak's orphanage, where he lived for a number of years. It was at the orphanage, where he received his first harmonica from Dr. Korzack.

Gogol eventually fled Warsaw during the war, and after spending time hiding in various places, including with his family in Maków Mazowiecki, he was captured and deported to Auschwitz. His harmonica was seized immediately upon arrival, but he eventually traded his rations to another prisoner for the prisoner's harmonica. Soon after, a Nazi heard him playing and he was forced to join the Auschwitz Orchestra, playing while Jews were entering into the gas chambers. While he played, Gogol saw his own family members being sent to the chambers, so he stopped opening his eyes when he played. He also vowed that if he survived he would teach Jewish children how to play the harmonica. This story was recounted in a sermon for Kol Nidre at Congregation Habonim Toronto.

After the war, Gogol moved to Israel where he founded the Ramat Gan Harmonica Orchestra, which was later named after him. In 1990, Gogol returned to Auschwitz for the first time, where he performed with the band the song "My Town Belz" (Yiddish: "My Shtetele Belz"), the same tune Gogol played when he was in the camp 50 years earlier, as prisoners were marched to their deaths.

In 1993, Gogol again traveled to Auschwitz, and in the presence of Israeli Prime Minister Yitzhak Rabin performed the same songs he had performed there as a prisoner.

About a month after this trip, Gogol died, at 69 years of age.

== Sources ==
- http://www.harmonicaisrael.com
