= Erwan Bergot =

French Army officer and author

Erwan Bergot (27 January 1930 – 1 May 1993) was a French Army officer and author; he served in the French Army during the First Indochina War and Algerian War.

== Biography ==
Born to a Breton family in Bordeaux, Erwan Bergot volunteered to serve in Indochina after completing his mandatory military service in 1951. He served in the 6th Colonial Parachute Battalion under Major Marcel Bigeard, after that he commanded the heavy mortar company of the 1st Foreign Parachute Battalion at the Battle of Dien Bien Phu. He was taken prisoner and experienced the hell of the Viet Minh internment camps; he was among the few that survived. In 1955, Bergot was recalled to serve in Algeria in the 2nd Foreign Parachute Regiment and 11e Choc. He was seriously wounded in his right eye during a clash at Constantine in 1961, leaving the frontline to write and report.

He became the first editor of the magazine of the French Army in 1962, writing his first book in 1964, Deuxième classe à Dien-Bien-Phu, which achieved immediate success. He then dedicated himself completely to writing, which resulted in around fifty books and additional notoriety. He received numerous literary awards including the prize of the Académie française and the Claude Farrère prize. The French Army annually awards an Erwan Bergot prize.

== Bibliography ==
- Deuxième classe à Dien-Bien-Phu, La table ronde, 1964
- Mourir au Laos, France-empire, 1965
- Les petits soleils, France-empire, 1967
- Prenez-les vivants, Balland, 1972
- La Légion, Balland, 1972; translated as The French Foreign Legion, Allan Wingate, 1975
- L'Afrikakorps, Balland, 1972; translated as The Afrika Korps, Allan Wingate, 1976
- Vandenberghe, le pirate du delta, Balland, 1973
- Les héros oubliés, Grasset, 1975
- La Légion au combat, Narvik, Bir-Hakeim, Dièn Bièn Phu, Presses de la cité, 1975
- Le dossier rouge, services secrets contre FLN, Grasset, 1976
- L'homme de Prague, Presses de la cité, 1975
- Bataillon Bigeard, Indochine 1952-1954, Algérie 1955-1957, Presses de la cité, 1976
- Les Cadets de la France Libre, Presses de la cité, 1978
- Commandos de choc en Indochine, les héros oubliés, Grasset, 1979
- Les 170 jours de Dien Bien Phu, Presses de la cité, 1979
- La 2e D.B., Presses de la Cité, 1980
- La guerre des appelés en Algérie 1956-1962, Presses de la cité, 1980
- Les sentiers de la guerre (fiction)
  - V.1 : Les sentiers de la guerre, Presses de la Cité, 1981
  - V.2 : Frères d'ames, Presses de la Cité, 1982
  - V.3 : Le flambeau, Presses de la Cité, 1983
- La Coloniale du Rif au Tchad, 1925-1980, Presses de la Cité, 1982
- Bataillon de Corée, les Volontaires Français, 1950-1953, Presses de la Cité, 1983
- Le régiment de marche de la Légion, Presses de la Cité, 1984
- L'héritage, Presses de la Cité, 1985
- Gendarmes au combat, Indochine 1945-1955, Presses de la Cité, 1985
- 11e Choc, Presses de la cité, 1986
- Convoi 42, la marche à la mort des prisonniers de Dien Bien Phu, Presses de la Cité, 1986
- La bataille de Dong Khê, la tragédie de la R.C.4, Indochine, mai-octobre 1950, Presses de la cité, 1987
- Bigeard, Perrin, 1988
- Bir Hakeim : février-juin 1942, Presses de la Cité, Paris, 1989
- Sud lointain (fiction)
  - V.1 : Le courrier de Saïgon, Presses de la Cité, 1990
  - V.2 : La Rivière des Parfums, Presses de la Cité, 1990
  - V.3 : Le maître de Baotan, Presses de la Cité, 1991
- Indochine 1951, l'Année de Lattre, une Année de Victoires
- Opération Daguet, Presses de la cité, 1991 (with Alain Gandy)
- Les Paras
