= Red and Blue (album) =

Studio album by Cee Farrow
- Released: 1983
- Recorded: March–December 1982
- Genres: New wave, synthpop
- Length: 38:35
- Label: Rocshire Records
- Producer: Andy Lunn

Red and Blue is the debut and only album from German singer Cee Farrow, released in 1983.

== Background ==
Originally a model, Farrow signed to Rocshire Records to release a full studio album. He worked with producer Andy Lunn and co-wrote various tracks, mainly with German keyboardist Lothar Krell. Red and Blue was recorded at Hotline Studios between March–December 1982 and was released in 1983 in America. The album was not a commercial success, although the lead single "Should I Love You" peaked at No. 82 on the Billboard Hot 100 and No. 91 on the Billboard R&B Chart.

A second single, "Don't Ask Why", was also released, while "Wildlife Romance" was issued as a 12" promotional single.

The album remained out-of-print for a long time, having never been issued on CD or made available digitally until May 2026 when Good Times reissued the album on CD for the first time. After the album's release, Rocshire Records suffered legal problems, which culminated in the seizing of the label's assets in January 1984. The label was shut down by U.S. Federal Marshalls as it had been financed entirely by millions of dollars that owner Rocky Davis' wife Shirley Davis had embezzled from Hughes Aircraft while she was working as an accountant there. As such, the label's master tapes remain in possession of the Feds.

== Critical reception ==
Professional ratings
Review scores
Source	Rating
Billboard	favourable
Cash Box	favourable

Upon release, Billboard included the album as one of their "Recommended LPs" in June 1983. They wrote: "Farrow doesn't pose any chart threat, but his tough urban blues reflect much of the new music heard on the street though lacking the cute slickness of commercial contenders. Synthesizer and saxophone join forces to drive Farrow's hypnotic excursions, combining the drone and the danceable on "Don't Ask Why," "Heartbreaking Affair" and "Touched.""

Cash Box listed the album as one of their "feature picks" during August 1986. They commented: "Although the lyrical content of his debut album is rather lacking in substance, Farrow more than makes up for the prose through his outstanding vocal ability. Influenced by such British art-rockers as David Bowie and Roxy Music's Bryan Ferry, Farrow's warbling adds subtle contours and shading to such offerings as "Touched," the cynical "Backwards" and the quirky "Distant Picture," all of which will comfortably fit on modern music playlists. A ballad entitled "Think of Me" also bodes well for Farrow, as does the catchy "Heartbreaking Affair," which features delicate saxwork."

== Track listing ==
No.	Title	Writer(s)	Length
1.	"Don't Ask Why"	Cee Farrow, Lothar Krell	3:15
2.	"Heartbreaking Affair"	Farrow, Krell, Seeliger	4:12
3.	"Touched"	Farrow	3:36
4.	"Wildlife Romance"	Farrow	3:50
5.	"Distant Picture"	Farrow	3:40
6.	"Should I Love You"	Farrow, Krell	4:00
7.	"Paint It Blue"	Farrow	4:55
8.	"Backwards"	Farrow, Krell	2:25
9.	"Lost and Memorized"	Farrow, Krell, Seeliger	4:57
10.	"Think of Me"	Farrow	3:45

== Chart performance ==
=== Singles ===
"Should I Love You"

Chart (1983)	Peak position
U.S. Billboard Hot 100	82
U.S. Billboard Hot R&B Singles	91

== Personnel ==
- Cee Farrow - vocals, artwork (cover concept)
- Pave - guitar
- Chris Hafner - guitar (tracks 2, 9)
- Lothar Krell - synthesizer, programming
- Peter Ponzol - saxophone, Lyricon
- Marc Tobias - saxophone (track 1-2)
- Ken Taylor - bass
- Nick Name - drums
- Andy Lunn - producer, mixing, engineer
- Wolfgang Auer - executive producer
- Jon Caffrey - engineer
- Mathias Dietrich - assistant engineer
- Carmine Di - engineer, mixing (track 10)
- Filiale - other (clothes)
- Boris Guderjahn - photography
