= Solly Yach =

South African water polo player

Personal information
- Nationality: South African
- Born: 12 September 1927
- Died: 30 May 1993 (aged 65); Cape Town, South Africa

Sport
- Sport: Water polo

Solly Yach (12 September 1927 – 30 May 1993) was a South African water polo player. He competed in the men's tournament at the 1952 Summer Olympics.
