= Research Department (Aman) =

Intelligence institute

The Research Department (Hebrew: חטיבת המחקר, romanized: HaTivat HaMechkar) is a unit in the IDF Directorate of Military Intelligence (Aman) that serves as the national assessor of intelligence in the State of Israel.

The Research Department's principal roles involve the analysis of information gathered by Aman's collection units and from the Intelligence Community at large; and forming tactical, strategic, and operative assessments, as well as reporting on the likelihood of war, and presenting these to military and political decisionmakers, including the Prime Minister.

The Research Department is the most established, senior research branch in the Intelligence Community, and works closely with the research bodies of Mossad, Shabak, as well as those of the Airforce and Naval intelligence agencies, the regional command's intelligence research branches and other intelligence entities from the IDF, the Security Forces, and the military industries and development bodies. It has an available reserve of human resources it can draw upon from among active-service soldiers.

The Department's activities are not limited to classical military intelligence research (i.e. purely military matters concerning hostile countries), but engages in a state, economic, industrial-developmental, internal security, and political areas which often do not have an immediate, literal military meaning. Israel is the only liberal-democracy in the world where military intelligence is charged with assessing the intelligence map on a national, military, and state levels, and there have been repeated calls to transfer some of these roles from the Research Department to a civilian body, such as the National Security Council, as is the case in the United States.

== History ==
Although on the operative and tactical level, the Research Department has often proven quite successful, on the strategic and political front it has committed crucial failures which had a decisive impact on the course of Israeli and regional history. Above all others, the failure to warn that the Yom Kippur War was imminent, remains the Research Department's greatest blunder. The Agranat Commission, which investigated the failures of the war, very severely criticized Research in particular and the Intelligence Community, in general. A host of high-ranking intelligence officers were dismissed, most notably Aman Director, Aluf Eli Zeira, and head of Research, Brigadier-General Aryeh Shalev.
