= 1952 in science fiction =

The year 1952 was marked, in science fiction, by the following events.

== Births and deaths ==
=== Births ===
- Douglas Adams (d. 2001)
- Robin Wayne Bailey
- Kage Baker (d. 2010)
- Steven Barnes
- João Barreiros
- Candas Dorsey
- Debra Doyle (d. 2020)
- Valerio Evangelisti (d. 2022)
- Jane Fancher
- Kathleen Ann Goonan (d. 2021)
- Muhammed Zafar Iqbal
- Gwyneth Jones
- Sharon Lee
- Brad Linaweaver (d. 2019)
- Nathan Lowell
- Susan R. Matthews
- Patrick O'Leary
- Marek Oramus
- Tim Powers
- Kim Stanley Robinson
- Mary Rosenblum (d. 2018)
- Al Sarrantonio
- Dana Stabenow
- Somtow Sucharitkul (also known as S. P. Somtow)
- Yoshiki Tanaka
- Tais Teng
- Lisa Tuttle
- Kathy Tyers
- David Weber
- David Zindell

== Literary releases ==
=== Serialized novels ===
- Big Planet by Jack Vance, Startling Stories (September), published in book form in 1957.
- The Demolished Man by Alfred Bester, Galaxy Science Fiction (January–March), published in book form in 1953, when it won the Hugo Award for Best Novel.
- Gravy Planet by Frederik Pohl and Cyril M. Kornbluth, published in book form as The Space Merchants in 1953.
- Tramp Space Ship by Robert A. Heinlein, Boys' Life (September–December), expanded and published in book form as The Rolling Stones, also in 1952.

=== First editions ===
- Les Animaux dénaturés by Vercors (in French), anthropologists find "missing links" in New Guinea, sparking a trial over their humanity after a scientist kills a hybrid offspring.
- Ballroom of the Skies by John D. MacDonald, leaders of an intergalactic empire are always chosen from among humans but must first be tested by extreme hardship.
- City by Clifford D. Simak, a collection of interconnected stories exploring humanity's future and its interactions with robots and aliens.
- The Crystal Horde by John Taine, silicon crystalline lifeforms threaten to overwhelm carbon life on Earth.
- The Currents of Space by Isaac Asimov, involves intrigue and political maneuvering on a remote planet in a galactic empire.
- Double Jeopardy by Fletcher Pratt, tackles industrial espionage and a locked-room mystery, both linked to a revolutionary matter-duplication process.
- Foundation and Empire by Isaac Asimov, continues the saga of the Foundation as it confronts challenges from within and without the galaxy.
- The Long Loud Silence by Wilson Tucker, Corporal Gary survives a post-apocalyptic America, facing quarantine, cannibals, and military, ultimately reuniting with a fellow survivor.
- Player Piano by Kurt Vonnegut, dystopian novel exploring the consequences of automation and its impact on society.
- Sentinels From Space by Eric Frank Russell, Captain David Raven must stop a mutant-led war for Mars and Venus's independence to keep humanity united for interstellar contact.
- The Sound of His Horn by Sarban, an alternate history where a Nazi officer hunts humans for sport in a dystopian future.
- The Starmen by Leigh Brackett, a space opera concerning the only race that is able to endure the rigors of interstellar travel.
- This Island Earth by Raymond F. Jones, a race of aliens recruiting "Peace Engineers" are actually using Earth as a pawn in an intergalactic war. (Note: It became the basis for the 1955 Universal-International science fiction film also titled This Island Earth.)
- The Weapon Makers (revised edition) by A. E. van Vogt, explores a future society where advanced weapons technology plays a crucial role in political power struggles. (Note: Serialized in 1943, first published in book form in 1947.)

=== Novellas ===
- Cholwell's Chickens by Jack Vance, Thrilling Wonder Stories (August)

=== Short stories ===
- "A Sound of Thunder" by Ray Bradbury, Collier's (June 28, 1952)
- "Surface Tension" by James Blish, Galaxy Science Fiction (August)

=== Juveniles ===
- Five Against Venus by Philip Latham (juvenile), the Robinson family crash-lands on Venus, survives with a scientist's help, and discovers a valuable antibiotic from a nuisance mold.
- Islands in the Sky by Arthur C. Clarke (juvenile), follows a young boy's adventure aboard a space station and his encounters with space travel.
- Marooned on Mars by Lester del Rey (juvenile), survival and adventure on the Martian surface.
- Mists of Dawn by Chad Oliver (juvenile), Dr. Nye's space-time machine sends his nephew to 50,000 BC, where he must survive for two weeks with minimal supplies.
- Rip Foster Rides the Gray Planet by Blake Savage (juvenile), Lt. Rip Foster must retrieve a valuable thorium asteroid while facing rival Space Force crew and enemy agents.
- Rocket Jockey by Lester del Rey (juvenile), a young man dreams of becoming a rocket pilot and exploring space.
- The Rolling Stones by Robert A. Heinlein (juvenile), follows the Stone family's spacefaring adventures.
- Son of the Stars by Raymond F. Jones (juvenile), a teenager discovers an alien survivor and works to protect him from the military while signaling for his rescue.

== Movies ==
| Title | Director | Cast | Country | Subgenre/Notes |
|---|---|---|---|---|
| Alraune | Arthur Maria Rabenalt | Hildegard Knef, Erich von Stroheim | West Germany | Horror |
| 1. April 2000 | Wolfgang Liebeneiner | Hilde Krahl, Joseph Meinrad, Curd Jürgens | Austria | Comedy Fantasy Romance (Note: Original title: 1 April 2000.) |
| Captive Women | Stuart Gilmore | Robert Clarke, Margaret Field, Gloria Saunders | United States | (Note: 1956 reissue title: 1000 Years from Now) |
| Invasion USA | Alfred E Green | Gerald Mohr, Peggie Castle, Dan O'Herlihy | United States | Drama War |
| Mother Riley Meets the Vampire a.k.a. My Son, the Vampire (USA) | John Gilling | Arthur Lucan, Bela Lugosi | UK | Horror Comedy |
| Radar Men from the Moon | Fred C. Brannon | George D. Wallace, Aline Towne, Roy Barcroft | United States | Action Family Serial film |
| Red Planet Mars | Harry Horner | Peter Graves, Andrea King, Orley Lindgren | United States | Drama |
| Untamed Women | Merle W. Connell, James R. Connell | Mikel Conrad, Doris Merrick, Richard Monahan | United States | War |
| Zombies of the Stratosphere | Fred C. Brannon | Judd Holdren | United States | Action Adventure Serial film |

== Awards ==
The main science-fiction awards known at the present time did not exist at this time.

== See also ==
- 1952 in science
