= Winston Science Fiction =

American juvenile science fiction book line

Winston Science Fiction logo

Winston Science Fiction was a series of 37 American juvenile science fiction books published by the John C. Winston Company of Philadelphia from 1952 to 1960 and by its successor Holt, Rinehart & Winston in 1960 and 1961. It included 35 novels by various writers, including many who became famous in the SF field, such as Poul Anderson, Arthur C. Clarke, Ben Bova, and Lester del Rey. There was also one anthology, The Year After Tomorrow, edited by del Rey and others. There was one non-fiction book Rockets Through Space: The Story of Man's Preparations to Explore the Universe by del Rey which details the factual science and technology of rocket flight. Many of the dust jackets became science fiction classics; the artists included Hugo Award winners Ed Emshwiller and Virgil Finlay along with Hugo nominees such as Mel Hunter and Alex Schomburg.

== Background ==
Juvenile science fiction hard covers had been published for some time prior to the beginning of the Winston series, most notably the Tom Swift series published from 1910 to 1941. However, as the Tom Swift series declined, and the economic pressures of World War II escalated, juvenile offerings became slim.

The Winston Publishing Company had a history of publishing material for youth since the early part of the 20th century, such as the Young People's Library and The Forward Series for Boys and Girls. After the publication of Robert A. Heinlein's Rocket Ship Galileo in 1947 revived the juvenile science fiction market, The Winston Publishing Company decided to develop a juvenile science fiction series that would be set apart from the pulp fiction of its time. Known and respected SF authors were hired, and each novel was to include a factual foreword explaining the science and technology referenced in the novel. The publisher's announcement of the series in Publishers Weekly clearly outlines the goals of the series:

Five compelling tales designed TO SELL to the expanding science fiction market! Only writers who have won the respect of the science fiction audience have been signed to write these accurate yet absorbing books. Each contains an explanation of new terms and a discussion of its scientific aspects. ... For all ages.

== History ==
The series began in 1952 with the publication of the first 5 books: Earthbound by Milton Lesser, Find the Feathered Serpent by Evan Hunter, Marooned on Mars by Lester del Rey, Son of the Stars by Raymond Jones, and Five Against Venus by Philip Latham. Later in the year a second group of five novels were added to the series: Sons of the Ocean Deeps by Bryce Walton, Mists of Dawn by Chad Oliver, Rocket Jockey by Phillip St. John, Islands in the Sky by Arthur Clarke, and Vault of the Ages by Poul Anderson. Each book was an original written especially for the Winston series, and marketed for the juvenile audience.

== Literary significance and reception ==
Differing from static characters like Tom Swift and the Lucky Starr series the Winston heroes show dynamic growth and character development throughout their novels and series.

== Artwork ==
Winston Science Fiction Endpaper by Alex Schomburg.

The first edition dust jacket illustrations by famous science fiction artists have made the Winston set highly collectible. Contributors include Hugo winning artists like Alex Schomburg (who also created the endpapers used in every book of the series) and Virgil Finlay, as well Hugo nominees like Mel Hunter, and Ed Emshwiller. One cover ("The Ant Men") is by Paul Blaisdell, best known for his monsters in low-budget science fiction movies of the 1950s such as "It Conquered the World"

Winston cover art features images of spaceflight, exploration (of Earth, Space, and Time) and other fantastical subject matter describing important scenes from each book. The art is similar in style to pulp fiction art of the time, but tends towards a believable and accurate portrayal of the subject matter. Artist Mel Hunter had extensive training in scientific and technical illustration, and a broad knowledge of space technologies.

== Books ==
The series was not numbered. This chronological list identifies the artists who usually illustrated the dustjackets only ("cover"), occasionally illustrated the novels too ("cover and interior illus.").

- Earthbound by Milton Lesser, cover by Peter Poulton (1952)
- Find the Feathered Serpent, Evan Hunter, cover Henry Sharp (1952)
- Five Against Venus, Philip Latham (Robert S. Richardson), cover Virgil Finlay (1952)
- Islands in the Sky, Arthur C. Clarke, cover Alex Schomburg (1952)
- Marooned on Mars, Lester del Rey, cover Paul Orban (1952)
- Mists of Dawn, Chad Oliver, cover Alex Schomburg (1952)
- Rocket Jockey, Philip St. John (Lester del Rey), cover Alex Schomburg (1952)
- Son of the Stars, Raymond F. Jones, cover Alex Schomburg (1952) – Clonar, book 1
- Sons of the Ocean Deeps, Bryce Walton, cover Paul Orban (1952)
- Vault of the Ages, Poul Anderson, cover Paul Orban (1952)
- Attack from Atlantis, Lester del Rey, cover Kenneth S. Fagg (1953)
- Battle on Mercury, Erik Van Lhin (Lester del Rey), cover Kenneth S. Fagg (1953)
- Danger: Dinosaurs!, Richard Marsten (Evan Hunter), cover Alex Schomburg (1953)
- Missing Men of Saturn, Philip Latham, cover Alex Schomburg (1953)
- The Mysterious Planet, Kenneth Wright (Lester del Rey), cover Alex Schomburg (1953)
- Mystery of the Third Mine, Robert W. Lowndes, cover Kenneth S. Fagg (1953)
- Planet of Light, Raymond F. Jones, cover Alex Schomburg (1953) – Clonar, book 2
- Rocket to Luna, Richard Marsten (Evan Hunter), cover by Alex Schomburg (1953)
- The Star Seekers, Milton Lesser, cover Paul Calle (1953)
- Vandals of the Void, Jack Vance, cover Alex Schomburg (1953)
- Rockets to Nowhere, Philip St. John (Lester Del Rey), cover Alex Schomburg (1954)
- The Secret of Saturn's Rings, Donald A. Wollheim, cover Alex Schomburg (1954)
- Step to the Stars, Lester del Rey, cover Alex Schomburg (1954) – Jim Stanley, book 1
- Trouble on Titan, Alan E. Nourse, cover Alex Schomburg (1954)
- The World at Bay, Paul Capon, cover Alex Schomburg (1954)
- The Year After Tomorrow, eds. Lester del Rey, Cecile Matschat, and Carl Carmer, cover and interior illus. Mel Hunter (1954) – anthology of nine short stories
- The Ant Men, Eric North, cover Paul Blaisdell (1955)
- The Secret of the Martian Moons, Donald A. Wollheim, cover Alex Schomburg (1955)
- The Lost Planet, Paul Dallas, cover Alex Schomburg (1956)
- Mission to the Moon, Lester del Rey, cover Alex Schomburg (1956) – Jim Stanley, book 2
- Rockets Through Space, Lester del Rey, cover and interior illus. James Heugh (1957) – Special Companion Book (nonfiction)
- The Year When Stardust Fell, Raymond F. Jones, cover James Heugh (1958)
- The Secret of the Ninth Planet, Donald A. Wollheim, cover James Heugh (1959)
- The Star Conquerors, Ben Bova, cover Mel Hunter (1959)
- Stadium Beyond the Stars, Milton Lesser, cover Mel Hunter (1960)
- Moon of Mutiny, Lester del Rey, cover Ed Emshwiller (1961) – Jim Stanley, book 3
- Spacemen, Go Home, Milton Lesser, cover Ed Emshwiller (1961)
