= Attack from Atlantis =

1953 novel by Lester del Rey

- 1st Edition Dust Jacket
- Author: Lester Del Rey
- Cover artist: Kenneth Fagg
- Language: English
- Genre: Science fiction novel
- Publisher: The John C. Winston Company
- Publication date: 1953
- Publication place: United States
- Media type: Print (Hardback & Paperback)
- Pages: 207 (first edition)

Attack from Atlantis (1953) is a science fiction novel written by Lester del Rey. The story follows the new U.S.S. Triton submarine on her maiden voyage, but trouble happens when the crew comes face to face with the inhabitants of the underwater city Atlantis.

Attack from Atlantis is one of the thirty-five juvenile novels that comprise the Winston Science Fiction set, which were published in the 1950s for a readership of teen-aged boys. The typical protagonist in these books was a boy in his late teens who was proficient in the art of electronics, a hobby that was easily available to the readers.

The story is set partly on the atomic powered submarine Triton. In the foreword, titled "Land Under the Sea", the author, although not a proper scientist, mentions the first real-life atomic sub: "The Nautilus is already being built. And just as this is being written, word has come that the first tests of an atomic power plant for the ship have been successful" (ix). Del Rey spends quite some time in his novel trying to explain the difference between the engine on the real nuclear submarine of the USS Nautilus and that of his own, fictional U.S.S. Triton.

== Premise ==
Certain crystals obtained from undersea volcanoes, when stimulated by small amounts of electricity, generate a forcefilm bubble that excludes liquids and solids with unlimited force. During the last Ice Age the Cro-Magnon ancestors of the Atlanteans discovered the forcefilm bubbles by accident, but then, through trial and error, developed the technology that enabled them to use the bubbles to live under the sea.

== Plot summary ==
At age seventeen, Don Miller is already an accomplished electronics technician, helping his uncle, Dr. Edward Simpson, with the testing of a new kind of submarine, the Triton I. Accompanied everywhere by his dog Shep, a schipperke, he has assumed that he would be aboard the boat for its sea trials, though he mans the communications gear on the surface support ship during the submarine's first test run somewhere south of Puerto Rico. That test run is commanded by Dr. Oliver Drake, who designed the submarine's new nuclear propulsion system. The test run is successful, in spite of some problems with the control systems and stress on certain crew members that has made them believe that they have seen, on the television screens that give a view of the outside of the submarine, men encased in form-fitting bubbles.

For the full test run the Triton will descend into the Milwaukee Deep, north of Puerto Rico. Because the United States Navy has taken an interest in Triton and has partly funded her development, the commanding officer on the test run will be Admiral Robert Haller. Dexter, the president's science advisor, and Senator Kenney are to accompany the crew as observers. Another of the observers going along is Sid Upjohn, a reporter. As they descend they find that they are losing control of the boat and, further, that they are being rammed by a whale. Unable to maneuver, they come down on an undersea plateau, twelve hundred fathoms (7200 feet) below the surface. Again they catch glimpses of men encased in bubbles, something that should be impossible. Emerging from the submarine in a bathysuit, Don makes the necessary repairs and the Triton leaves the plateau to head for the surface.

Now the bubble-men attack openly in full force, cementing rocks to Triton's hull to drive her down again. Again the crew bring their boat down on the plateau where they had stopped for repairs. Again Don prepares to go out in the bathysuit to remove the rocks, but the bubble-men, which the crew have taken to calling Atlanteans, have sealed the hatch through which the bathysuit must emerge. As the crew watches helplessly through their closed-circuit televisions, the Atlanteans attach thick ropes to the submarine and then bring in ichthyosaurs that have evolved to breathe water to tow the boat off the plateau. As they pull Triton deeper, the Atlanteans envelope the boat in a forcefilm bubble, obliging the navigator, Kayne, to shut down the engines. Even with the boat being towed, without power, the helmsman, Paul Cavanaugh, continues to steer the boat to give them a smoother ride.

Three miles below the surface they come to a town of about 20,000 people that they call Atlantis. Lying under a larger version of the bubbles that enclose the people surrounding the submarine, the town is illuminated by some phosphorescent substance. There Triton is towed through the forcefilm dome that covers the town and into a pool large enough to accommodate her. Then the Atlanteans break into the boat and take the crew prisoner, knocking them out with some kind of electric stungun.

Don regains consciousness in a cell where he meets Muggins, an American whom the Atlanteans had rescued from a ship sunk in the war, fifty years previously. Muggins tells Don that the people call their town Mlayanu and he introduces him to K'mith, the president of Mlayanu. Don discovers that K'mith, his family, and several other Atlanteans speak English, having learned it from Muggins in order to read the books that they find in sunken ships and to understand the radio messages that they pick up occasionally through a floating antenna.

Because Shep resembles the dog-god that the more superstitious Atlanteans worship, it is decided that Don and Shep will live with K'mith and his family. In K'mith's home he meets K'mith's wife and twelve-year-old daughter and his nephew S'neifa, the son of his deceased older brother K'mayo, who had rescued Muggins. As Don gets settled into K'mith's house, S'neifa tells him how an outcast European tribe, some 28,000 years ago, made some accidental discoveries that enabled them to live underwater and develop the Atlantean civilization. Because he's under eighteen, the Atlanteans assume that Don is uneducated, but S'neifa suspects and then confirms the truth. He then gives Don a copy of a radio message that the Atlanteans have picked up: it tells Don that the garbled distress call from Triton had been misinterpreted and that the United States has accused another country of capturing the submarine.

Later Don goes for a walk with Shep and finds the building where the town's dome is created and controlled open and unguarded. Sneaking around inside the building, he discerns how the system works and he takes a discarded diagram as he leaves. That evening he takes the diagram to show to Dr. Drake and his uncle. Little can be gleaned from the diagram, but the men do discern that the forcefilm could protect a city from a nuclear attack. Returning to K'mith's house, Don tells K'mith of the discovery, but K'mith already knows about it. As for Don's plea to let the Triton and her crew return to the surface, K'mith shows Don another intercepted radio message: the United States and the country it had accused of taking the Triton have exchanged ultimatums and nuclear war is less than a week away.

That night S'neifa brings Don a bubble suit so that he can free the Triton's crew from the small bubble-dome in which they are imprisoned. At a certain signal S'neifa will activate the forcefilm bubble around Triton so that she can escape her confinement in Mlayanu. All goes well until several fights break out. Kayne and Senator Kenney reach the submarine, board her, and give the signal. S'neifa activates the forcefilm and Kayne takes the boat out of Mlayanu, leaving Don and the rest of the crew behind to be recaptured. Later Kayne and Kenney are brought into the jail, having been recaptured just after reaching the surface.

Kept in a cell separate from the rest of Triton's crew, Don asks Muggins to bring him some metal tubing and tools so that he can make a tin whistle to pass the time. He then makes an ultrasonic dog whistle, which he uses to call Shep. After several incidents when Shep comes at his call the dog is chained up and then begins to howl when Don calls him. An angry mob forces K'mith and the dome technicians to allow Don to designate the dome-control building as the dog-god's shrine. Don then uses a signal generator that he had retrieved from Triton to modulate the current creating the dome forcefilm, causing a loud hum and salt rain to come from the dome and terrify the mob. Don then discovers that K'mith has had his own agenda which meshes perfectly with what Don had intended: the Atlanteans have been unable to find any more of the crystals that they need and he had hoped that scientists on the surface world might be able to make more. Don assures him that they can and will. Thus Don and the crew of the Triton are released and the Triton, fitted with a forcefilm that will allow the boat's engines to run when it is turned on, leave Myalanu with K'mith and S'neifa aboard.

== Publication history ==
- 1953, US, John C. Winston Co., Pub date Sep 1953, Hardback (207 pp). Includes the foreword, Land Under the Sea.
- 1958, US, John C. Winston Co., Pub date Feb 1958, Hardback (207 pp). Includes the foreword, Land Under the Sea.
- 1960, France, Attention... L'Atlantide attaque (Attention! The Atlantean Attack!), Les Editions Daniber, Pub date Apr 1960, Paperback (191 pp).
- 1961, US, John C. Winston Co., Pub date Nov 1961, Hardback (207 pp). Includes the foreword, Land Under the Sea.
- 1964, US, Holt, Rinehart and Winston, Pub date Apr 1964, Hardback (207 pp). Includes the foreword, Land Under the Sea.
- 1969, US, Tempo Books/Grosset & Dunlap, Pub date Apr 1969, Paperback (vi+181 pp). Includes the foreword, Land Under the Sea.
- 1978, US, Del Rey/Ballantine, ISBN 0-345-27448-2, Pub date Jun 1978, Paperback (167 pp). Does not include the foreword.
- 1982, US, Del Rey/Ballantine, ISBN 0-345-30501-9, Pub date Aug 1982, Paperback (167 pp). Does not include the foreword.

== Reception ==
Writing in The New York Times, Villiers Gerson received the novel favorably, saying "The virtue of Mr. Del Rey's book is in his handling of his characters." Reviewer Groff Conklin praised the novel for its "swift pacing, vivid imagination, real characters and absence of juvenile melodrama." P. Schuyler Miller found it unimpressive, however, "notches below" del Rey's earlier Marooned on Mars.

== See also ==
- 1953 in science fiction
- List of underwater science fiction works
- Winston Science Fiction – American juvenile science fiction book line
- Undersea Trilogy, three science fiction novels by Frederik Pohl and Jack Wiliamson
