= Milford Writer's Workshop =

Annual science fiction writer's event

Milford Writer's Workshop (or more properly Milford Writers' Conference)
- Status: Active
- Genre: Conference
- Frequency: Annually
- Venue: Various
- Locations: • Milford, Pennsylvania, U.S. (before 1972) • Various locations, including the United Kingdom (1972–2019, 2021–)
- Inaugurated: 1950s
- Founder: Damon Knight, among others
- Previous event: 16–23 September 2023
- Next event: 13–20 September 2024
- Participants: Science fiction writers
- Major events: Writers' workshop
- Website: milfordsf.co.uk

The Milford Writer's Workshop, or more properly Milford Writers' Conference, is an annual science fiction writer's event founded by Damon Knight, among others, in the mid-1950s, in Milford, Pennsylvania. It was so named because Knight, Judith Merril, and James Blish lived in Milford when it was founded. It moved to the United Kingdom in 1972 and has run successfully ever since on an annual basis.

== Description ==
Judith Merril, James Blish, and Damon Knight founded the Milford Writer's Conference in 1956. It is both a residential workshop and a writers' conference in which published science fiction writers convene over the course of a week to intensively critique stories and samples from novels (usually works in progress) and to workshop ideas on all aspects of SF writing. It is a peer-to-peer conference with no teachers or students.

Milford and related entities like Science Fiction Forum presaged the creation of the Science Fiction Writers of America in 1965 and that decade's New Wave movement. In 1972, Blish in association with his wife, J.A.Lawrence, set up the United Kingdom Milford SF Writers' Conference, which initially met in Milford on Sea, Hampshire with an attendance of fifteen, mostly famous names in SF. Since then it has been held in various locations, latterly Devon until 2001, York in 2002 and 2003, and (since 2004) at Trigonos Conference Centre in North Wales, usually in mid September.

The conference went on hiatus in 2020, due to the Coronavirus lockdown.

== Honorary committee ==
An honorary committee is elected annually at the AGM held during the Milford week. The 2015 committee (elected 2014) comprised: Sue Thomason (Chair), Liz Williams (Secretary), Tina Anghelatos (Treasurer), Jacey Bedford (Vice-Chair, Website and Mailing Lists), Kari Sperring, and Karen Williams. Committee members are listed on the workshop's official web site.

== Participants ==
Participants must have sold at least one science fiction story to qualify for attendance, and relative newcomers to publication are welcomed, though participants often have multiple novel and/or short story sales to their credit. Qualification details are quoted on the workshop's official website.

Workshop participants in the United States (pre-1972) included:

- James Blish
- Anthony Boucher
- John Brunner
- Dorris Pitkin Buck
- Algis Budrys
- Jack Dann
- Avram Davidson
- Lester Del Rey
- Samuel R. Delany
- Thomas M. Disch
- Gardner Dozois
- George Alec Effinger
- Harlan Ellison
- Carol Emshwiller
- Ed Emshwiller
- Harry Harrison
- Gustav Hasford
- Cyril Kornbluth
- Keith Laumer
- Ursula K. Le Guin
- Katherine MacLean
- Anne McCaffrey
- Richard McKenna
- Judith Merril
- Frederik Pohl
- Jane Roberts
- Joanna Russ
- James Sallis
- Robert Silverberg
- Ted Sturgeon
- Kurt Vonnegut
- Gene Wolfe

Milford is the model for other peer-to-peer science fiction writer workshops, including the Turkey City Writer's Workshop, the Clarion Workshop and the Clarion West Writers Workshop.

Participants in the UK (in 1972 and afterward) have included:

- Tom Arden
- Jacey Bedford
- John Brunner
- John Clute
- Jaine Fenn
- Neil Gaiman
- Mary Gentle
- John Grant
- Colin Greenland
- Ben Jeapes
- Diana Wynne Jones
- Gwyneth Jones
- David Langford
- George R. R. Martin
- Anne McCaffrey
- Naomi Mitchison
- Alastair Reynolds
- Kari Sperring
- Andrew Stephenson
- Bruce Sterling
- Charles Stross
- Karen Traviss
- Liz Williams
- Patricia Wrede

A full list of former Milford participants is listed on the workshop's official website.

== Milford rules ==
Manuscripts are distributed beforehand. Everyone reads, critiques, and prepares before the formal workshop begins. Etiquette precludes participants from discussing the manuscripts beforehand either with the author or other members of the critique group. The participants sit in a circle. The author whose work is being critiqued must sit in silence through the first part, in which each participant in turn is allowed an uninterrupted four minutes (timed) to deliver their critique. Then the author has an uninterrupted right to reply. Following that a general discussion ensues. Constructive criticism is strongly encouraged. In the last few years it has become acceptable for the critiqued manuscripts to be given back to the author, complete with notes.

This so-called "Milford method" has been adopted by several writers' groups, including the Glasgow Science Fiction Writers Circle.

== See also ==
- List of writers' conferences
