= Fantastic Universe =

U.S. science fiction magazine, 1953–1960

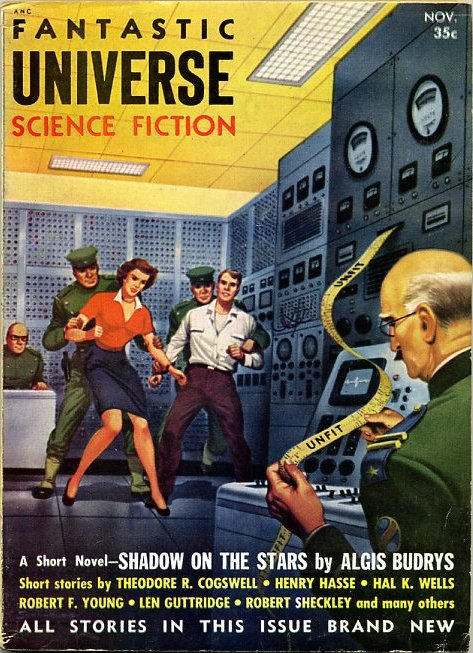
- November 1954 issue; cover by Alex Schomburg
- Categories: Science fiction magazine
- Publisher: Leo Margulies, H.L. Herbert
- First issue: June–July 1953
- Final issue: March 1960
- Country: United States
- Language: English

Fantastic Universe was a U.S. science fiction magazine which began publishing in the 1950s. It ran for 69 issues, from June 1953 to March 1960, under two different publishers. It was part of the explosion of science fiction magazine publishing in the 1950s in the United States, and was moderately successful, outlasting almost all of its competitors. The main editors were Leo Margulies (1954–1956) and Hans Stefan Santesson (1956–1960).

The magazine is not highly regarded by science fiction historians, but some well-received stories appeared, including "Who?", by Algis Budrys, which formed the basis for Budrys's novel of that name, and several stories of Robert E. Howard's, rewritten by L. Sprague de Camp to feature Howard's character Conan the Barbarian. Under Santesson's tenure the quality declined somewhat, and the magazine became known for printing much UFO-related material. A collection of stories from the magazine, edited by Santesson, appeared in 1960 from Prentice-Hall, titled The Fantastic Universe Omnibus.

== Publication history ==
The early 1950s saw dramatic changes in the world of U.S. science fiction (sf) publishing. At the start of 1949, all but one of the major magazines in the field were in pulp format; by the end of 1955, almost all sf magazines had either ceased publication or switched to digest format. This change was largely the work of the distributors, such as American News Company, who refused to carry the pulp magazines since they were no longer profitable; the loss of profitability was in turn associated with the rise in mass-market science fiction publishing, with paperback publishers such as Ace Books and Ballantine Books becoming established. Along with the increase in science fiction in book form came a flood of new U.S. magazines: from a low of eight active magazines in 1946, the field expanded to twenty in 1950, and a further twenty-two had commenced publication by 1954.

Fantastic Universe was launched in the midst of this publishing boom. The publisher was King-Size Publications, founded by Leo Margulies and H. L. Herbert. Margulies had been in the pulp industry since 1932, having worked for Frank Munsey and then for Beacon Magazines, where he had had overall responsibility for all their titles, including several sf pulps such as Startling Stories and Thrilling Wonder Stories. The first issue of Fantastic Universe was in digest format, dated June–July 1953, and priced at 50 cents. This was higher than any of the competing magazines, but it also had the highest page count in the field at the time, with 192 pages. The initial editorial team was Leo Margulies as publisher, and Sam Merwin as editor; this was a combination familiar to science fiction fans from their years together at Thrilling Wonder Stories, which Merwin had edited from 1945 to 1951. King-Size Publications also produced The Saint Detective Magazine, which was popular, so Fantastic Universe enjoyed good distribution from the start—a key factor in a magazine's success. Merwin left after three issues, and after a brief period in which Beatrice Jones was editor, Margulies took over as editor with the May 1954 issue.

King-Size Publications was in debt by mid-1956, and in August Margulies sold his stake in the company to Herbert, telling a friend that in addition to the debt there were personality conflicts and that the company couldn't generate enough income for two investors. The editorship passed to Hans Stefan Santesson with the September 1956 issue. In late 1959 the magazine was sold to Great American Publications, and it was significantly redesigned. The size was increased to that of a glossy magazine, although the magazine was still bound rather than saddle-stapled.

Circulation figures for Fantastic Universe are unknown, since at that time circulation figures were not required to be published annually, as they were later. After the magazine folded, the publisher entertained plans to publish material bought for the magazine as a one-shot issue to be titled "Summer SF", but the issue never appeared. Santesson did later edit an anthology drawn from the magazine, titled The Fantastic Universe Omnibus.

== Contents and reception ==
The first issue included stories by Arthur C. Clarke, Philip K. Dick, and Ray Bradbury. According to Donald Tuck, the author of an early SF encyclopaedia, the magazine kept a fairly high quality through Merwin's departure after a year, and through the subsequent brief period of caretaker editorship by Beatrice Jones. The quality of the fiction is thought by Tuck to have fallen during Santesson's period at the helm, though this was not entirely his fault—there were a great many other magazines competing for stories by the top writers. Santesson himself, despite a modicum of controversy over his heavy use of UFO and related material, was kind and helpful to writers, and was well liked as a result. According to sf critic John Clute, Fantastic Universe "published second-rank work by many well-known writers", and was one of the "magazines that never seem to ... publish much worthwhile material", and sf critic and historian Brian Stableford describes Fantastic Universe as "the poor man's F&SF".

In October 1955, Santesson began contributing "Universe in Books", a regular book review column. When Santesson took over from Margulies as editor a year later, an immediate change was an increase in the number of articles about UFOs. Santesson ran several articles by writers such as Ivan T. Sanderson, Kenneth Arnold, and Gray Barker. Lester del Rey, however, felt that Santesson was not a believer in UFOs: "So far as I could determine, Santessen [sic] was skeptical about such things, but felt that all sides deserved a hearing and also that the controversies were good for circulation."

Fantastic Universe published several significant stories during its seven-year history. These included stories from Tales of Conan, a collection of four Robert E. Howard stories rewritten as Conan stories by L. Sprague de Camp. Three of the stories were published in Fantastic Universe, two before the book, and one after:

- "Hawks Over Shem" (October 1955)
- "The Road of the Eagles" (as "Conan, Man of Destiny", December 1955)
- "The Blood-Stained God" (April 1956)

Other notable and widely reprinted stories included:

- "Short in the Chest", by Margaret St. Clair (writing as Idris Seabright, July 1954).
- "Who?", by Algis Budrys (April 1955). Formed the basis for Budrys's novel, Who?
- "The Minority Report", by Philip K. Dick (January 1956). The basis for the movie Minority Report.
- "First Law", by Isaac Asimov (October 1956). One of Asimov's robot stories.
- "Curative Telepath", by John Brunner (December 1959). Formed the basis of Brunner's novel The Whole Man.
- "The Large Ant", by Howard Fast (February 1960).

Other writers who appeared in the magazine included Harlan Ellison, Jorge Luis Borges, Clifford Simak, Harry Harrison, and Robert Bloch. Two articles by Sam Moskowitz appeared in the last few months of the magazine, "Two Thousand Years of Space Travel", and "To Mars and Venus in the Gay Nineties", on early science fiction; these had been intended for publication in Satellite Science Fiction, one of the magazines Margulies had started when he left King-Size Publications, but Satellite had ceased publication in early 1959.

Under King-Size Publications, the magazine had had no artwork except small "filler" illustrations; now interior illustrations complementing the stories were introduced, and photographs and diagrams accompanied some of the articles. A fan column, by Belle C. Dietz, began, and Sam Moskowitz wrote two detailed historical articles about proto-sf. However, the March 1960 issue was the last one. Fredric Brown's "The Mind Thing" had begun serialization in that issue; it was eventually published in book form later that year.

== Bibliographic details ==
	Jan	Feb	Mar	Apr	May	Jun	Jul	Aug	Sep	Oct	Nov	Dec
1953						1/1		1/2		1/3		
1954	1/4		1/5		1/6		2/1		2/2	2/3	2/4	2/5
1955	2/6	3/1	3/2	3/3	3/4	3/5	3/6	4/1	4/2	4/3	4/4	4/5
1956	4/6	5/1	5/2	5/3	5/4	5/5	5/6	6/1	6/2	6/3	6/4	6/5
1957	7/1	7/2	7/3	7/4	7/5	7/6	8/1	8/2	8/3	8/4	8/5	8/6
1958	9/1	9/2	9/3	9/4	9/5	9/6	10/1	10/2	10/3	10/4	10/5	
1959	11/1		11/2		11/3		11/4		11/5	11/6	12/1	12/2
1960	12/3	12/4	12/5									
Issues of Fantastic Universe showing volume and issue numbers. The colors identify the editors of each issue: Sam Merwin Beatrice Jones Leo Margulies Hans Stefan Santesson

The magazine began as a 192-page digest, priced at 50 cents, giving it more pages than the competing magazines but also pricing it higher than any of them. The experiment did not last, presumably because sales figures were weak: the fourth issue, January 1954, cut the price to 35 cents, and Fantastic Universe stayed at that price for the rest of its life. The page count also dropped, to 160 pages with the fourth issue, then to 128 pages with the eighth issue, September 1954. The page count stayed at 128 through the rest of the digest period, and for the first five issues of the "glossy" period under the new publisher. The last issue cut the page count to 96 pages.

The magazine was initially bimonthly. The first three issues were named with two months: "June–July 1953", and so on. At the end of 1953 the naming was changed to the odd numbered months; and then after January, March, May, and July, the magazine went monthly, starting with the September 1954 issue. This lasted without a break until the November 1958 issue. Another bimonthly schedule, starting with January 1959, followed; the last King-Size Publications issue was September 1959, and it was followed by an October 1959 issue from Great American. The remaining five issues followed a regular monthly schedule; the last issue was March 1960. The volume numbering scheme was fairly regular; the first five volumes had six numbers each. Volume 6 had only five numbers, in order to get the new volume 7 to start with the new year, in 1957. This lasted until volume 10 was cut short at five numbers when the magazine returned to a bimonthly schedule at the end of 1958. Volume 11 had six numbers; volume 12 had five.

The editors were:

- June–July 1953 to October–November 1953: Sam Merwin Jr. (3 issues)
- January 1954 to March 1954: Beatrice Jones (2 issues)
- May 1954 to August 1956: Leo Margulies (26 issues)
- September 1956 to March 1960: Hans Stefan Santesson (38 issues)

Cover art was by Alex Schomburg, Ed Emshwiller, Kelly Freas, and Mel Hunter, and towards the end there was a long sequence of covers by Virgil Finlay.

== Sources ==
- Ashley, Michael (1976). The History of the Science Fiction Magazine Vol. 3 1946–1955. Chicago: Contemporary Books, Inc. ISBN 0-8092-7842-1.
- Ashley, Michael (1978). The History of the Science Fiction Magazine Part 4 1956–1965. London: New English Library. ISBN 0-450-03438-0.
- Ashley, Mike (1985a). "Fantastic Universe". In Tymn, Marshall B.; Ashley, Mike (eds.). Science Fiction, Fantasy, and Weird Fiction Magazines. Westport, Connecticut: Greenwood Press. pp. 250–254. ISBN 0-313-21221-X.
- Ashley, Mike (1985b). "Satellite Science Fiction". In Tymn, Marshall B.; Ashley, Mike (eds.). Science Fiction, Fantasy, and Weird Fiction Magazines. Westport, Connecticut: Greenwood Press. pp. 493–497. ISBN 0-313-21221-X.
- Ashley, Mike (2005). Transformations: The Story of the Science Fiction Magazines from 1950 to 1970. Liverpool: Liverpool University Press. ISBN 0-85323-779-4.
- Ashley, Mike (2022). The Rise of the Cyberzines: The Story of the Science-Fiction Magazines from 1991 to 2020. Liverpool: Liverpool University Press. ISBN 978-1-80085-648-6.
- Clute, John (1995). Science Fiction: The Illustrated Encyclopedia. New York: Dorling Kindersley. ISBN 0-7894-0185-1.
- del Rey, Lester (1979). The World of Science Fiction and Fantasy: The History of a Subculture. New York: Ballantine Books. ISBN 0-345-25452-X.
- Nicholls, Peter (1993). "Pulp magazines". In Clute, John & Nicholls, Peter (eds.). The Encyclopedia of Science Fiction (2nd ed.). New York: St. Martin's Press, Inc. pp. 978–980. ISBN 0-312-09618-6.
- Shaw, Debra Benita (2000). Women, Science and Fiction. Basingstoke, UK: Palgrave. ISBN 978-1-349-40999-0.
- Sherman, Philip (2017). Leo Margulies: Giant of the Pulps. Boston: Altus Press. ISBN 978-161827298-0.
- Stableford, Brian & Nicholls, Peter (1993). "Pulp magazines". In Clute, John & Nicholls, Peter (eds.). The Encyclopedia of Science Fiction (2nd ed.). New York: St. Martin's Press, Inc. p. 405. ISBN 0-312-09618-6.
- Stableford, Brian (1981). "Fantastic Universe". In Nicholls, Peter & Nicholls, Peter (eds.). The Encyclopedia of Science Fiction. St. Albans, UK: St. Martin's Press, Inc. p. 209. ISBN 0-586-05380-8.
- Tuck, Donald H. (1982). The Encyclopedia of Science Fiction and Fantasy: Volume 3. Chicago: Advent: Publishers, Inc. ISBN 0-911682-26-0.
