= Missing Men of Saturn =

1953 novel by Robert S. Richardson

- 1953 First Edition Dust Jacket
- Author: Robert S. Richardson (as Philip Latham)
- Cover artist: Alex Schomburg
- Language: English
- Genre: Science fiction novel
- Publisher: The John C. Winston Company
- Publication date: 1953
- Publication place: United States
- Media type: Print (hardback & paperback)
- Pages: 215 pp (first edition)

Missing Men of Saturn is a juvenile science fiction novel, published first in 1953, by astronomer and author Robert S. Richardson (as Philip Latham) with cover illustration by Alex Schomburg. The story concerns Dale Sutton's mission to the dreaded planet Saturn from which no one has ever returned. Missing Men of Saturn is a part of the Winston Science Fiction set of juvenile novels.

== Plot ==
Dale Sutton, a recent graduate from the Space Academy, is assigned to the Albatross, a decrepit old spaceship. When the Albatross is assigned to explore the mysterious ringed planet Saturn, Dale remembers the story of Captain Dearborn who had commanded the first and last mission to Saturn. When the Albatross reaches Saturn's moon Titan, the superstitious fears of the crew are realized as equipment begins to disappear, and eventually people.

== Reception ==
New York Times reviewer Villiers Gerson praised the novel as "an excellent tale." P. Schuyler Miller identified it as the best of the early run of Winston juveniles, citing both its scientific accuracy and the relatively realistic stature of its hero.

== Characters in "Missing Men of Saturn" ==
- Dale Sutton - Recent graduate of Space Academy where he was a "big man on campus", sent on expedition to Saturn.

== Publication history ==
- 1953, United States, The John C. Winston Company, Pub date 1953, Hardback
