= The Year When Stardust Fell =

1958 book by Raymond F. Jones

- First edition cover
- Author: Raymond F. Jones
- Cover artist: James Heugh
- Language: English
- Genre: Science fiction novel
- Published: 1958 (John C. Winston Company)
- Publication place: United States of America
- Media type: Print (Hardback)
- Pages: 203 (Hardback edition)
- ISBN: 1153659018
- OCLC: 1137133

The Year When Stardust Fell is a science fiction novel written by Raymond F. Jones. It was initially published in 1958 by the John C. Winston Company.

This is one of the thirty-five juvenile novels that comprise the Winston Science Fiction set, which novels were published in the 1950s for a readership of teen-aged boys. The typical protagonist in these books was a boy in his late teens who was proficient in the art of electronics, a hobby that was easily available to the readers. In this story, as in Son of the Stars, the protagonist has a ham radio and a small observatory with a telescope he built himself.

== Synopsis ==
The menace in this story consists of dust from the tail of a comet. It consists of a colloid, analogous to smoke, that incorporates an unknown transuranic element. That element has a great affinity for metal surfaces and it weakens their surface tension, thereby enabling rapidly moving parts to cold weld themselves into solid rigidity.

== Plot ==
In the town of Mayfield high-school senior Ken Maddox is among the people fascinated by a giant comet whose path is just grazing Earth's orbit. For the next four months Earth will float within the comet's tail and on the first night of that sojourn Ken's car and others begin to have problems with overheating. The next day almost all of the cars in Mayfield and other cities across the country have overheated and then refused to start. Soon all machinery is seizing up, its moving parts cold welded to each other. Because the effect is happening all over the world, people begin blaming the comet.

As the disaster becomes progressively more serious, Ken and his friends in the high school's science club prepare to study samples of the fused metal at the local college, where Ken's father teaches chemistry, and to try to get a sample of what the comet is putting into Earth's atmosphere. While they work, Mayfield is cut off from the outside world and the mayor and the sheriff impose rationing against the anticipated shortages.

After a short stint in a wood-cutting crew bringing in fuel for the coming winter, Ken is called to assist in the work at the college. Along with his friends and the other scientists, he helps with experiments aimed at identifying the cause of the cold-welding phenomenon. A spectroscopic look through a telescope, compared to spectrograms of the affected metals confirms that the comet is the source of the trouble. At the same time Ken and his friends make contact with several ham radio operators around the country, intending to share information.

Little by little, as civilization crumbles around them, the Mayfield science team learns about the comet dust and how to protect machinery from it. One by one, the radio contacts cease as violence sweeps over the metropolitan areas, but aided by a clue from Berkeley just before it was destroyed Ken's father devises a compound that will decontaminate metal surfaces. A failed attack by marauders attempting to rob the town and a flu epidemic decimate the population, but Ken has an idea that using ultrasound will coagulate the comet dust so that it will fall out of the atmosphere. Egged on by a pair of fanatics, a mob burns the college, but not before the knowledge of the ultrasonic coagulators has been shared. With people in more and more areas building coagulators and decontaminating metal parts, people around the world begin the slow and painful process of rebuilding civilization.

== Publication history ==
- 1958, USA, John C. Winston Company (Winston Science Fiction #31), Pub date 1958 Mar 17, Hardback (203 pp)
- 1960, Germany, Pabel Verlag (Utopia Grossband #124), Pub date 1960, Paperback digest (94 pp), as Sternenstaub (Star Dust)

== Reviews ==
The book was reviewed by

- P. Schuyler Miller at Astounding Science Fiction (Feb 1959)
- Floyd C. Gale at Galaxy Magazine (Jun 1959)

== Listings ==
The book is listed at

- The Library of Congress as http://lccn.loc.gov/58005676
- The British Library as UIN = BLL001898143
