= Rocket to Luna =

1953 novel by Evan Hunter

- 1953 First Edition Dust Jacket
- Author: Evan Hunter (as Richard Marsten)
- Cover artist: Alex Schomburg
- Language: English
- Genre: Science fiction novel
- Publisher: The John C. Winston Company
- Publication date: 1953
- Publication place: United States
- Media type: Print (hardback & paperback)
- Pages: 211 pp (first edition)

Rocket to Luna is a juvenile science fiction novel by prolific author and screenwriter Evan Hunter (as Richard Marsten) published in 1953 by The John C. Winston Company with cover illustration by Alex Schomburg. The story follows the adventures of the main character Ted Baker after he mistakenly replaces a member of the first lunar expedition at the last moment before the rocket leaves for the Moon. Rocket to Luna is a part of the Winston Science Fiction set, a series of juvenile novels which have become famous for their influence on young science fiction readers and their exceptional cover illustrations by award-winning artists.

== Plot introduction ==
Ted Baker is beginning his fourth year at the Space Academy, which is to take place on the Earth orbiting space station. On his trip to the station from Earth, he is accompanied by a recent graduate of the Academy, Jack Talbot, who is to be part of the first expedition to the Moon as a backup member. On arrival at the station, Ted discovers that Jack's collarbone was injured during the launch to the station. Fearing that Jack's injury could endanger the other men on the expedition, he confronts Jack about his injury. Jack refuses to give up his chance at glory, forcing Ted into a physical confrontation. Jack is knocked unconscious, and Ted hurriedly boards the moon rocket to inform the expedition of Jack's injury. Unfortunately, the countdown has already begun, and cannot be stopped. Ted is now the fifth man of the expedition.

== Characters in "Rocket to Luna" ==
- Ted Baker - Main character, 4th year Space Academy student, mistakenly replaces a member of the Moon rocket crew
- Dan Forbes - Ship's engineer, believes Ted is a glory-seeking stowaway who replaced Jack on purpose
- Dr. Phelps - Ship's doctor, member of the lunar expedition
- Dr. Gerhardt - Ship's geologist, member of the lunar expedition
- Jack Talbot - Ted's former classmate, graduated, supposed to be pinch-hitter crew member for Moon rocket, replaced by Ted
- George Merola - Captain of Moon rocket, injured during flight

== Reception ==
P. Schuyler Miller described Rocket to Luna as a "prelude," suggesting it was intended to set up a series of sequels.

== Publication history ==
- The 183 page book is sold in paperback, hardcover, and electronic versions.
- It is printed in kindle in the English version.
- 1953, USA, The John C. Winston Company, Pub date 1953, Hardback

== See also ==
- Winston Science Fiction
