= Robots and Changelings =

1957 collection of fantasy and science fiction stories by Lester del Rey

- First edition cover
- Author: Lester del Rey
- Cover artist: Richard M. Powers
- Language: English
- Genre: Fantasy, science fiction
- Publisher: Ballantine Books
- Publication date: 1957
- Publication place: United States
- Media type: Print
- Pages: 175 pp

Robots and Changelings is the second collection of fantasy and science fiction stories by Lester del Rey, published by Ballantine Books in 1957.

== Contents ==
- "The Pipes of Pan" (Unknown 1940)
- "Little Jimmy" F&SF 1957)
- "The Coppersmith" (Unknown 1939)
- "No Strings Attached" (If 1954)
- "The Still Waters" (Fantastic Universe 1955)
- "Kindness" (Astounding 1944)
- "Stability" (Vortex 1953)
- "Keepers of the House" (Fantastic Universe 1956)
- "Uneasy Lies the Head" (Ten Story Fantasy 1951)
- "The Monster" (Argosy 1951)
- "Into Thy Hands" (Astounding 1945)

"The Coppersmith" was originally published as "Ellowan Coppersmith". "The Still Waters was originally published as "In the Still Waters."

== Reception ==
Floyd C. Gale wrote that all of the stories "have the stamp of [del Rey's] compassion [for the unhuman]". Damon Knight found the stories "memorable for their quiet compassion." Newspaper reviewer Earl Heath described the book as "good and different stories [which] will amuse you, arouse you, and perhaps chill you a bit."
