= The Star Conquerors =

1959 book by Ben Bova

- First edition
- Author: Ben Bova
- Cover artist: Mel Hunter
- Language: English
- Genre: Science fiction
- Published: 1959 (John C. Winston Company)
- Publication place: United States
- Media type: Print (Hardback)
- Pages: 215 (Hardback edition)
- OCLC: 1238415

The Star Conquerors is a science fiction novel by American writer Ben Bova. It was published in 1959 by the John C. Winston Company.

This is one of the thirty-five juvenile novels that comprise the Winston Science Fiction set, which novels were published in the 1950s for a readership of teen-aged boys. The typical protagonist in these books was a boy in his late teens who was proficient in the art of electronics, a hobby that was easily available to the readers. In this book, though, the protagonist is a junior officer, about twenty years old, in the Star Watch, the interstellar navy of the Terran Confederation.

== Plot ==
For ten years the Terran Confederation has been at war with a reptilian species, called the Saurians, who are controlled by the unknown Masters. It's been a losing war for the Terrans and their allies and now the Scandian system is under attack. Geoffrey (Jeff) Knowland, a junior officer of Star Watch must lead a fighting evacuation of the planet Northolm. He succeeds, but the Frontier Coordinator, Heath Knowland, his father, reprimands him for losing men in a diversionary raid.

Needing a rest, Jeff goes to Earth to present his father's plan for defending the Confederation to the ruling Council. The war isn't going well and the prospects don't look good: the Masters’ empire extends across most of the galaxy while the Terran Confederation spans only 200 light years.

While the Council debates the plan that Jeff has presented, the Saurians attack the main Star Watch fleet and defeat it, killing Jeff's father. Shocked, the Council agrees to the Knowland Plan and also to an attack by a Terran Expeditionary Force into enemy space to knock the Saurians off balance. Heading out to Orion, the force defeats several Saurian fleets, destroying enemy ships faster than they lose their own. They conquer a vast volume of space and then seek to make allies of the subjugated people whom they find.

After a period of rest, repair, and reinforcement, the Expeditionary Force sets out again, fighting its way across thousands of light years. It then encounters a giant force controlled by the Masters. A quick and daring attack forces the Masters to flee and the human fleet scatters its attackers. In the wreckage of an enemy ship the humans find an intact set of star charts and use them to locate the Masters’ home worlds.

Using a new astrogation system, the fleet proceeds directly to the Masters’ star cluster. The Saurians there are completely unprepared and are easily defeated. Jeff then confronts one of the Masters on the Masters’ ancient home world. The Master tells Jeff that having won the war, he is now responsible for an empire comprising eighty billion star systems, and then the Master vanishes.

== Publication history ==
- 1959, USA, John C. Winston Company (Winston Science Fiction #33), Pub. date 2 November 1959, Hardback (215 pp)
- 1962, USA, Holt, Rinehart and Winston, Pub. date November 1962, Hardback (215 pp)
- 1966, Germany, Arthur Moewig Verlag (Terra Utopische Romane, Band #443), Pub. date February 1966, Paperback Digest (66 pp), as Bezwinger der Galaxis (Conquer the Galaxy)
- 2013, USA, ReAnimus Press, Pub. date July 2013, Softcover (196 pp),

== Reviews ==
The reviewer at Kirkus Reviews (Kirkus Reviews Issue: 1 November 1959) had this to say about the novel:

A fantasy which pivots about prehistoric and recorded history, is replete with obvious devices of warfare, stock characters, and awkward dialogue. Another case where the conception is in no way equalled by the characters or events.

== Sources ==
- Tuck, Donald H. (1974). The Encyclopedia of Science Fiction and Fantasy. Chicago: Advent. pg. 59. ISBN 0-911682-20-1.

== Listings ==
The book is listed at

- The Library of Congress as http://lccn.loc.gov/59013109
- The British Library as UIN = BLL000437623
