= Stadium Beyond the Stars =

1960 novel by Stephen Marlowe

- 1960 First Edition Dust Jacket
- Author: Milton Lesser
- Cover artist: Mel Hunter
- Language: English
- Genre: Science fiction novel
- Publisher: The John C. Winston Company
- Publication date: 1960 (first edition)
- Publication place: United States
- Media type: Print (hardback & paperback)
- Pages: 206 pp (first edition)

Stadium Beyond the Stars is a juvenile science fiction novel by Milton Lesser published in 1960 by Holt, Rinehart & Winston with cover illustration by Mel Hunter. The story follows the adventures of Steve Frazer, a champion spacesuit racer on Earth's Olympic team, as the ship taking him and the rest of the team to the center of the galaxy for the Interstellar Olympic Games intercepts a mysterious derelict spaceship. Stadium Beyond the Stars is a part of the Winston Science Fiction set, a series of juvenile novels which have become famous for their influence on young science fiction readers and their exceptional cover illustrations by award winning artists.

== Plot introduction ==
Steve Frazer, a champion spacesuit racer on Earth's Olympic team, is headed to the center of the galaxy with the rest of the Earth team on board the Hellas. When they intercept a mysterious derelict spaceship, he volunteers to investigate. Once on board the ship, he discovers evidence of a non-human intelligence that seems to communicate through telepathy. Upon his arrival back to the Hellas, Steve tells the others what he found, but no one believes him. Disqualified from competition on false charges, he realizes that he has become mixed up in a deadly game of interstellar intrigue.

== Reception ==
Floyd C. Gale rated the book 2.5 stars out of five for children, stating that "Although melodramatic hogwash", it had "enough action and originality".

== Publication history ==
- 1960, USA, the John C. Winston Company, pub. date 1960, hardback

== See also ==
- Winston Science Fiction
