= Planet of Light =

1953 novel by Raymond F. Jones

- Cover of the first edition
- Author: Raymond F. Jones
- Illustrator: Alex Schomburg (endpaper)
- Cover artist: Alex Schomburg
- Language: English
- Genre: Science fiction
- Published: 1953 (The John C. Winston Company)
- Publication place: United States
- Media type: Print (Hardcover)
- Pages: 211 (hardcover edition)
- Preceded by: Son of the Stars

Planet of Light is a science fiction novel by American writer Raymond F. Jones, first published in 1953 by the John C. Winston Co. as part of its 35-book set of juvenile novels. Written as a sequel to Son of the Stars, the story follows Ron Barron and his family as they are taken to a planet in the Great Galaxy of Andromeda to participate in a meeting of an intergalactic analogue of the United Nations. They face the question if Earth is ready to join an intergalactic society.

This is one of the thirty-five juvenile novels that comprise the Winston Science Fiction set, which were published in the 1950s for a readership of teen-aged boys. The typical protagonist in these books, like Ron Barron, was a boy in his late teens who was proficient in the art of electronics, a hobby that was easily available to the readers.

== Plot ==
When he was rescued by his own people at the end of Son of the Stars, the alien boy Clonar left behind his wrecked spaceship’s IVP hyperwave radio. Now his friend, Ron Barron, is working with the United States Air Force to develop their own version of it. As he works on the device Ron hears Clonar calling from his home planet of Rorla and inviting Ron and his family to come attend a meeting of the Galactic Federation. Nine days later Ron, his father George, his mother, his ten-year-old sister Francie, and Anne Martin, his girlfriend are picked up by the crew of a giant discus-shaped starship and taken to Rorla, the Planet of Light, where the Barrons and Anne are obliged to live in a colony of houses that has been established for the conference delegates.

On their first day in the colony Ron and Anne meet Borah, an affable bear-like creature from Haddon’s Galaxy and George meets a pair of swashbuckling cyanide-breathers named Barmese and Athol, whom Borah describes as intergalactic desperadoes. They also discover that the director of the colony is Tenarg, the Fleet Commander who, a year earlier, had ordered the destruction of Earth. Still filled with disdain for the people of Earth, Tenarg intends to make the Barrons’ stay on Rorla as miserable as possible.

Taking their cues from Tenarg, the other delegates shun the Barrons and nothing the Barrons can do changes that situation. In desperation George consults Barmese and Athol on the situation and is drawn into a plot to assassinate Tenarg. When it appears that the plot has succeeded, the outlaws flee.

From traces of toxic gas found in Tenarg and George’s bodies, the Rorlans quickly deduce what happened and who was responsible. Ron and Clonar join the crew of a Rorlan interstellar Patrol ship to go in pursuit of the desperadoes to a poisonous hellworld, from which the Patrolmen bring Barmese back to Rorla for trial.

After the trial of Barmese Ron comes to understand that the conference is a sham. It was merely a means by which the Rorlans could subject the delegates, especially those from Earth, to a stress test, to determine whether they were truly ready to join the Galactic Federation. Ron is outraged by the deceit, but then, prodded by Anne, realizes that he was just as deceitful, hiding his true nature under a false desire to bring Rorlan technology back to Earth.

Chastened, Ron asks their Rorlan advisor what Earth can contribute to the Galactic Federation. The advisor tells Ron that the aging Federation needs Earth’s energy, drive, and vitality to rejuvenate itself. Earth will be admitted to the Federation because, instead of seeking a handout as Ron originally intended, the people of Earth will contribute their own talent and will work together with the other races of the Federation as equals.

== Publication history ==
- 1953, US, John C. Winston Co., Pub date Oct 1953, Hardback (xi+211 pp)
- 1956, US, John C. Winston Co., Pub date Aug 1956, Trade Paperback (211 pp)
- 1957, Sweden, Pionjär I Rymden (Pioneer in Space), Wennerbergs, Paperback (160 pp)

== Reviews ==
The book was reviewed by

- The Editors at The Magazine of Fantasy and Science Fiction (April 1954)
- Groff Conklin in Galaxy Science Fiction (June 1954)

== Sources ==
- John Clute and Peter Nicholls. "Jones, Raymond F". The Encyclopedia of Science Fiction edited by John Clute, David Langford, Peter Nicholls and Graham Sleight. London: Gollancz, updated 19 June 2014. Web. Accessed 8 July 2014.
- Tuck, Donald H. (1974). The Encyclopedia of Science Fiction and Fantasy. Chicago: Advent. pg. 247. ISBN 0-911682-20-1.
