= Rocket Jockey (novel) =

1952 novel by Lester del Rey

- 1952 First Edition Dust Jacket
- Author: Lester del Rey (as Philip St. John)
- Cover artist: Alex Schomburg
- Language: English
- Genre: Science fiction
- Publisher: The John C. Winston Company
- Publication date: 1952
- Publication place: United States
- Media type: Print (hardback & paperback)
- Pages: 207 (first edition)

Rocket Jockey is a juvenile science fiction novel by Philip St. John (a pseudonym of American writer Lester del Rey) with cover illustration by Alex Schomburg. The story follows the heroic efforts of young man Jerry Blaine in his efforts to win the famous rocket race, the Armstrong Classic. Rocket Jockey is a part of the Winston Science Fiction set, a series of juvenile novels which have become famous for their influence on young science fiction readers and their exceptional cover illustrations by award-winning artists.

== Plot introduction ==
The Armstrong Classic is a rocket race throughout the inhabited Solar System and has become the driving force for the advancement of rocket and space technologies. It is extremely dangerous, and there are always fatalities, but it is regarded as the trial that proves the merit of a prospective spaceman. It is said that "only a fool would enter such a race, and only a genius or a Martian could win". In a twist of fate, a young man, Jerry Blaine is kicked out of the Space Institute at his brother's request to help him get ready for the 18th Armstrong Classic. When his brother is injured in a fueling accident, Jerry must take over command of the Last Hope and try to win the Classic for earth.

== Plot summary ==
Jerry Blaine, a young man studying at the Space Institute, is kicked out just after his second year exams at the request of his brother, Dick, in order to help him get his ship, the Last Hope ready for the 18th Armstrong Classic. Jerry is initially bitter, but realizes that how he conducts himself in the classic will go a long way toward proving himself as a spaceman, and eventually being readmitted to the institute.

The Last Hope is a refitted asteroid mining ship using Jerry and Dick's father's experimental fuel which is supposed to be a radical improvement upon existing technologies. Their parents were both killed in the first test of the fuel however, and it is only now, years later, that improvements in materials and engine design will allow the fuel to be tested again safely.

Just before liftoff, Dick is injured when fuel splashes in his face, temporarily blinding him. Jerry is forced to take control of the Last Hope while his brother is incapacitated below decks. The qualification run to the moon is begun, and Jerry is racing against 10 other ships from earth for the right to represent their home planet in the classic proper. Jerry manages to win, but only after he witnesses the first fatality of the classic; a fellow Earth pilot pushes his engines too hard and his ship overheats and is destroyed.

After some political talk on the Moon that puts Jerry officially in charge of the Last Hope despite his brother's seeming recovery, they head out to touch on the 4 Galilean moons, Mars, and Venus. Heading for Mars first they make good time and land with high spirits.

The Martians are not happy to see them, however. There has always been a bitter rivalry between the two worlds, and Mars has a reputation for winning the classic at all costs and through any means, scrupulous or otherwise. When they try to refuel the Last Hope they discover their shipment of fuel has somehow disappeared from the warehouse in which it was stored. A long search finally locates the missing fuel in a pile of garbage that was ready for destruction. Jerry, Dick, and Tod all believe that Mars was intentionally responsible for the delay of 18 hours searching for the fuel. They take off from Mars and head towards Jupiter.

Halfway however, Jerry discovers that Dick has not fully recovered from his injuries. He becomes sick and delirious, and they are forced to turn back to Mars to get Dick the medical care he needs. By the time the Last Hope leaves Mars for the second time, they are nearly 100 hours behind schedule, and their carefully planned course is now useless.

En route to Jupiter for the second time the Last Hope loses power due to a blockage of the rocket tube. Losing more time, they coast while making repairs. Unfortunately, they coast so far, they no longer have the distance necessary to decelerate to rendezvous with the Jovian moons. Jerry is forced into a nearly suicidal braking maneuver into the Jovian atmosphere known as the "Dead Man's Orbit". Despite Jerry's vague recollections, such a feat had never before been accomplished, and he receives admiration and applause upon arrival on Io.

After visiting the other 3 Jovian moons and experiencing an unfriendly reception on Ganymede, considered by many to be a puppet of Mars, the Last Hope set course back to the inner planets: Venus, Mercury, and Earth. While approaching the asteroid belt, they intercept a distress call, and come to the aid of what appears to be the Martian racers. After rendering assistance and parting ways, Jerry realizes his asteroid chart has been stolen. He must now navigate the belt by memory and luck.

After some close calls and an actual impact with a small pebble, the Last Hope makes it through the belt relatively unscathed. Because of the delay with the decoy Mars racer, they are no longer in a position to rendezvous with Venus. Mercury is now their best stop.

== Characters in "Rocket Jockey" ==
- Jerry Blaine - Main character, young man discharged from the Space Institute halfway through, to compete in the classic
- Dick Blaine - Jerry's older brother, asteroid miner, entered the Last Hope into the classic in order to prove his late father's revolutionary fuel
- Tod MacLane - Friend of the Blaines', crack engineer, mentor to Jerry

== Major themes ==
- Coming of Age
- Rocket science

== Literary significance and reception ==
As a part of the Winston Science Fiction set, Rocket Jockey has helped lay the foundation for many young science fiction readers. The dust jacket was illustrated by Alex Schomburg, a prolific comic artist and nominee for Hugo Award for Best Professional Artist in 1962.

== Allusions and references ==
Rocket Jockey takes a realistic scientific look at rocketry and space navigation, utilizing technologies that were understood at the time of publication. It extrapolates the advancement in chemical rocketry to a point where constant 1-2g acceleration is possible, making travel through the Solar System a matter of days rather than years.

== See also ==
- 1952 in science fiction
- Winston Science Fiction
