= Badge of Infamy =

1963 novel by Lester del Ray

Badge Of Infamy
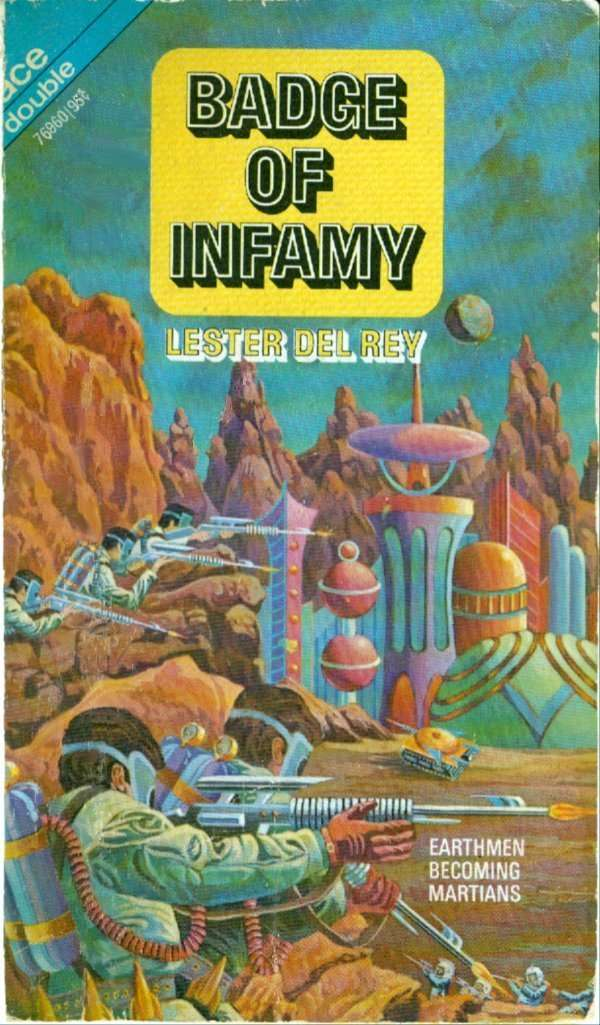
- Author: Lester del Rey
- Language: English
- Genre: Science fiction novel
- Publisher: Galaxy Science Fiction Novels
- Publication date: 1963
- Publication place: United States
- Media type: Print paperback
- Pages: 121

Badge of Infamy (1963) is a juvenile science fiction novel written by American writer Lester del Rey.

== Publication history ==
The first version of the story appeared in Satellite Science Fiction June, 1957. A longer version was published by Galaxy Science Fiction Novels in 1963. It was the first in Galaxy's new series of digest-sized books combining two works by a single author; Badge of Infamy was bound with del Rey's The Sky Is Falling, which was also an expansion of a shorter work. (Note: This work is based on "No More Stars," first published in the July 1954 issue of Beyond, under his pseudonym Charles Satterfield) The two were republished together again in 1973 as an Ace double. A review in Luna Monthly criticized the "double" format, saying that The Sky Is Falling is a much worse story than Badge of Infamy, and complaining that it is challenging for a reviewer "to tell you the reader that only half of this or any other book is worth buying". The review praised Badge of Infamy for its exciting storytelling "that does not preach". It has more recently been released as a standalone ebook by Feedbooks.

== Synopsis ==
In the future, powerful unions called lobbies control much of society. One of the most powerful lobbies is the medical lobby, which following a pandemic that spread across earth, has required all medicine from being practiced only by authorized lobby members and only in approved lobby facilities. Daniel Feldman was once a doctor but has now become a pariah due to his breach of these rules. Trying to escape the shame he travels to Mars, where he discovers a disaster threatening billions of lives. He practices unauthorized medicine again, and eventually frees Mars from the control of Earth and the lobby system.
