= Moon of Mutiny =

1961 novel by Lester del Rey

- 1961 First Edition Dust Jacket
- Author: Lester Del Rey
- Cover artist: Ed Emshwiller
- Language: English
- Series: Jim Stanley Series
- Genre: Science fiction novel
- Publisher: Holt, Rinehart & Winston
- Publication date: 1961
- Publication place: United States
- Media type: Print (hardback & paperback)
- Pages: 217 pp (first edition)
- ISBN: 0-345-30606-6
- OCLC: 28447138
- Preceded by: Mission to the Moon

Moon of Mutiny is a juvenile Science fiction novel by author Lester del Rey published in 1961 by Holt, Rinehart & Winston as the final part of the Jim Stanley Series (the first two books being Step to the Stars and Mission to the Moon). The story takes place mostly on the Moon following the adventures of the main character Fred Halpern after he is expelled from Goddard Space Academy for insubordination, and tries to find his way back into space.

It was probably most popular as a part of the Winston Juvenile Science Fiction set which included 36 books by such authors as Arthur C. Clarke, Ben Bova, Poul Anderson, including five by del Rey. The dust jacket features an illustration by 5-time Hugo Award winner Ed Emshwiller.

== Plot introduction ==
Fred Halpern, a young man with a gift for mentally calculating trajectories and orbits is expelled from the Goddard Space Academy a week before graduation due to his long history of insubordination and lack of discipline. Because of a foolish attempt to land on the Moon in a stolen rocket which caused him to be trapped and the subsequent death of one of his rescuers, he is ostracized by the space community. When given a final chance to show he has grown up, he questions his motives and wonders if he can escape his past.

== Plot summary ==
Fred Halpern, a young man (presumably high-school age) training at the Goddard Space Academy is expelled a week before graduation due to his long history of insubordination and arrogance, despite his top-rate piloting skills and uncanny ability to accurately figure trajectories and orbits in his head.

Some time prior to the opening of the book and his training at the academy, Fred had been living with his father aboard the space station which his father commands. When it had become clear that the United States was falling behind in the race to the Moon, Fred stole one of the taxi rockets from the station and made a successful trip to the Moon on his own. On touch-down, however, his rocket tipped over, landing on the air-lock, and trapping Fred inside. The rescue effort was costly and dangerous, and resulted in the death of one of the rescuers.

Because of this history, Fred is looked upon by other cadets and space-men as a glory-hog and pariah, but is lauded by the media as a hero. This causes much tension in Fred's relationships as he tries to escape his past, and earn a place in space.

Fred's hero status in the popular media has allowed him to earn enough money to pay for school, and donate his surplus earnings to the struggling Moon colony, which he hopes someday to join.

Upon his expulsion from the academy, Fred temporarily returns to his father's station before his exile to Earth begins. He realizes that he has grown out of life on the station, and that he is unable to contribute there in any meaningful way. During his stay on the station he meets Dr. Sessions, the leader of the imminent expedition to the moon, but can't bring himself to ask for a place on the already overcrowded expedition. At the last minute, one of the expedition's pilots is injured, and in order to embark in the desired launch window, Fred is asked to join despite the reservations of Sessions.

During the course of the expedition Fred has several personal epiphanies regarding his past and his current goals. He realizes that his past behavior has been arrogant, self-centered, and reckless, and makes a decision early on to grow up and learn discipline and good judgment. He also learns that underlying his arrogance and recklessness lies real and valuable skills which he can put to good use if his judgment can be honed.

== Characters in Moon of Mutiny ==
- Fred Halpern - Main character, washed out cadet looking for opportunity to return to space
- Major Wickman - Fred's foil, doesn't buy into Fred's mental abilities, thinks he's an arrogant and dangerous glory hog
- Doctor Sessions - Leader of the 3rd lunar exploration expedition, takes a chance on Fred
- Doctor Ramachundra - Staunch opponent of the lunar colony, sent to the Moon to convince him of its merits

== Major themes ==
Moon of Mutiny is ultimately a telling of the Hero's journey in which the main character is faced with adventure, and adversity, and by striving to attain the goal of his travels also attains self-knowledge and enlightenment, and ultimately returns to the ordinary world with his improved character.

== Literary significance and reception ==
Moon of Mutiny was published in 1961 at the trailing end of the Golden Age of Science Fiction. Like many juvenile stories of that time, it is a "Coming of age" story, featuring an adolescent who, through the trials of a fantastic adventure, grows out of childhood and into adulthood.

== Allusions and references ==
=== Allusions to other works ===
Moon of Mutiny is a loosely related finale in a trilogy called the "Jim Stanley Series". The botched Moon landing referred to in the novel actually occurs in the prior book in the series Mission to the Moon which features a main character who does not appear in Moon of Mutiny.

=== Allusions to actual history, geography and current science ===
The story tends towards Hard science fiction in its use of contemporary technology and scientific concepts, and even includes a foreword by del Rey giving some factual scientific background on the Moon. The focus of the story is not on the science, however, but more on the personal growth of the main character.

== Publication history ==
- 1961, United States, Holt, Rinehart & Winston ISBN 0-345-30606-6, Pub date 1961, Hardback

== See also ==
- Winston Science Fiction
