= Mists of Dawn =

1952 novel by Chad Oliver

- 1952 first edition dust jacket
- Author: Chad Oliver
- Cover artist: Alex Schomburg
- Language: English
- Genre: Science fiction novel
- Publisher: The John C. Winston Company
- Publication date: 1952
- Publication place: United States
- Media type: Print (hardback & paperback)
- Pages: 208 pp (first edition)

Mists of Dawn is a juvenile science fiction novel by science fiction writer and anthropologist Chad Oliver first published in 1952 by John C. Winston, Co. as a part of the Winston Science Fiction series of juvenile novels. The story follows the adventures of adolescent Mark Nye when he is accidentally transported to the Stone Age by his uncle's time machine. It includes a factual foreword on the science of anthropology and how Oliver uses this science in the telling of his story.

== Plot introduction ==
Dr. Robert Nye, a nuclear physicist working at White Sands Missile Range has finally finished his space-time travel machine after 20 years of research. On the eve of its maiden voyage to Ancient Rome, Dr. Nye's nephew Mark is trapped inside and sent back in time to the year 50,000 BC when a nearby rocket test explosion sends him careening into the controls. When Mark arrives at his destination he must survive the two weeks it takes the space-time machine to recharge for the return trip with nothing but a few matches, a pocket knife, and a 6-shot .45 revolver.

== Plot summary ==
Upon his arrival in the Stone Age, Mark ventures out of the space-time machine in search of food and water. He is soon accosted by a group of Neanderthals who drag him back to their cave lair. Mark suspects he is to become dinner, so he shoots one of his guards and escapes, barely managing to evade his captors in an all-night chase. Mark finally finds a place to hide and collapses into exhausted slumber.

When he awakens, Mark sees a reindeer-like animal, and takes two more shots from his revolver to take it down. After building a fire and roasting part of his kill, Mark again feels he is being watched. Rather than more Neanderthals, however, he sees a human figure resembling an American Indian whom he suspects is a Cro-Magnon man. He offers to share his food, and they establish a rapport, both realizing neither intends to harm the other. Mark discovers the man's name is Tlaxcan. In the face of an imminent storm, they cooperate to build a crude lean-to and rest for the night.

When Mark wakes up, Tlaxcan is nowhere to be found, but he notices a group of vultures circling not too far away. Mark investigates to find Tlaxcan lying injured near a dead wolf-like animal. Mark tends to Tlaxcan's wounds and they set off to return to Tlaxcan's home.

They reach the valley of the Danequa, Tlaxcan's people, only to be confronted by several Danequa men. Tlaxcan vouches for Mark, but tensions are still high. Qualxan, the shaman of the tribe, takes Mark alone into a cave and puts on a ritual display of "magic" in order to establish his dominance over Mark. Mark leaves the cave and uses his matches to "create" fire out of thin air in front of the whole tribe. This earns him the respect of many members of the tribe, but an old warrior, Nranquar, is unimpressed. He maintains the only way for Mark to prove himself is to join the hunt for mammoth.

When the time for the hunt comes, the whole tribe participates. Their strategy revolves around distracting and agitating the mammoth herd enough that they can induce it to stampede off the edge of a cliff. At one point during the hunt Nranquar is about to be trampled but is rescued by Mark, who is himself injured.

At the conclusion of the hunt the tribe celebrates with a massive feast at the site of the mammoth stampede. After the revelries Mark and Tlaxcan leave with the bulk of the tribe, returning to their valley taking as much of the meat as they can carry, leaving a small contingent of hunters to guard the remainder of the kill.

When Mark and Tlaxcan return to the site of the kill to relieve the guards, they spot circling vultures and suspect an ambush. They change course and manage to avoid the Neanderthal trap, but the Neanderthals, in frustration, charge wildly after the two. This results in a furious chase across the plains, eventually landing Mark and Tlaxcan in a deep cavern where they battle a bear-like creature. Finally prevailing against these threats, they return to the valley of the Danequa.

When the tribe learns of what has happened they hold a war council and decide to embark upon a campaign against the Neanderthal settlement. During the time when the Danequa are preparing for war, Qualxan hints that he knows Mark will soon be leaving the Danequa and returning to the "land of his fathers". Qualxen suggests that before he leaves, Mark visit Tloron, a Danequa holy man.

Tlaxcan leads Mark deep into a cave in the valley where he finds Tloron working by the light of soapstone lamps on a magnificent cave painting. Mark realizes that he has seen this particular image before, 50,000 years in the future, yet he is witnessing it at the moment of its creation.

Finally the Danequa march off to war. A battle ensues, and Mark and Tlaxcan pursue some Neanderthals across the plains in the direction of the space-time machine. The two friends prevail against the Neanderthals, and Mark says his goodbyes. He sets his return time to 15 minutes after he left his own time, and returns home.

== Characters in "Mists of Dawn" ==
- Mark Nye - the main character, a 17-year-old boy
- Dr. Robert Nye - Mark's uncle, a nuclear physicist working at White Sands.
- Tlaxcan - a Cro-Magnon hunter, befriends Mark
- Nranquar - An old and respected Danequa, does not initially welcome Mark until he proves himself in the Mammoth hunt
- Qualxen - Danequa shaman, accepts Mark after his display of his mastery of fire (by matches)
- Tloron - Danequa "holy" man, practices the white magic of cave painting

== Reception ==
Boucher and McComas praised the novel for "combin[ing] solid thinking on the elements of time travel with a warmly sympathetic portrait of Cro-Magnon civilization."

== See also ==
- Winston Science Fiction
