= The Sky Is Falling (Del Rey novel) =

1954 novel by Lester del Rey

Cover of the Ace books edition.

The Sky Is Falling is a short novel by American writer Lester del Rey.

The first and shortest version was published in Beyond Fantasy Fiction in July 1954 under the title "No More Stars" with the pseudonym Charles Satterfield. It first appeared in book form in 1963 with Badge of Infamy as "Two Complete Novels" in a Galaxy paperback original. The first book-length version was published in 1973 by Ace Books.

== Plot summary ==
Computer engineer Dave Hanson is transported from Earth to a world where the rules of science and physics are replaced by the rules of magic. The new world is similar to Ancient Egypt, with pyramids and prophets, and where the rulers use magical rituals to transport people from Earth when their skills are needed.

Hanson was summoned to help save the world's sky from collapsing. The sky is a literal dome that arches above the world, with the sun and stars not massive celestial bodies trillions of miles away, but smaller lights that move about within the dome of the sky.

Hanson must find a way to reconcile his scientific knowledge with the magic of his new world, while also navigating complex social rules that threaten his life should he fail to fulfill his goals.
