= Science Fiction Forum =

Forum

Science Fiction Forum was a critical journal of science fiction. It was created by Damon Knight and James Blish in 1957. Lester del Rey was also an editor.

The publication was created to continue discussions that began at the first Milford Writer's Conference in 1956. A famous essay by Damon Knight on the symbolism in James Blish's short story "Common Time" was published in a 1957 issue, and later reprinted in Knight's In Search of Wonder.

The magazine helped lead to the creation of the Science Fiction Writers of America.
