= Nathan Lowell =

Science fiction writer (born 1952)

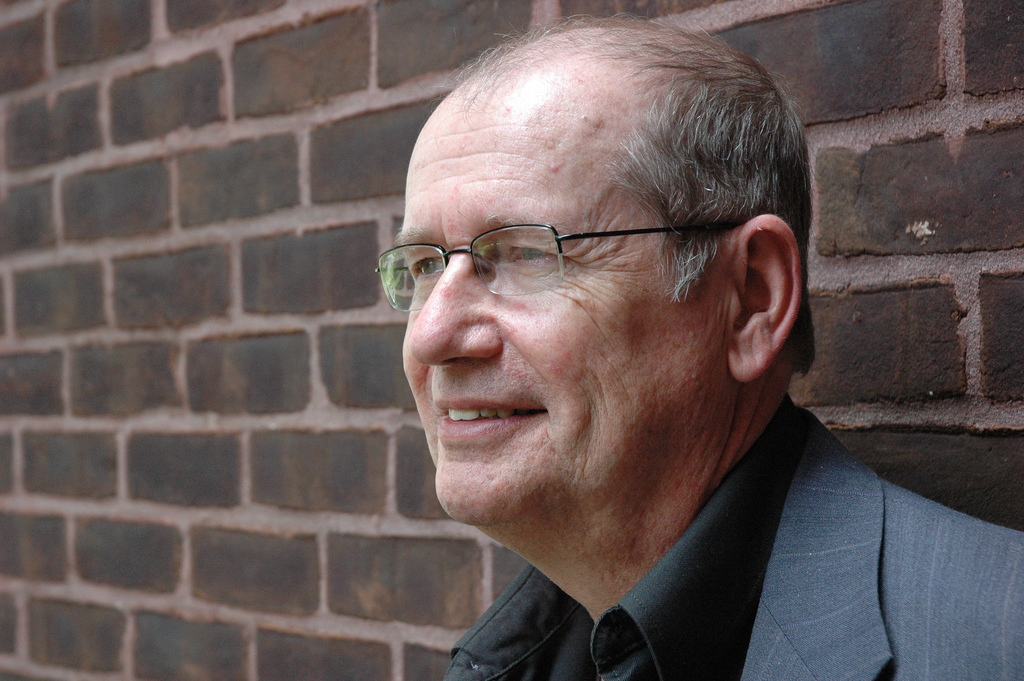
- Born: Nathan Lowell; October 12, 1952 (age 73); Portland, Maine, United States
- Occupation: Novelist
- Writing career
- Genre: Science fiction
- Notable work: The Golden Age of the Solar Clipper
- Website: nathanlowell.com

Nathan Lowell is a science fiction writer mostly known for his The Golden Age of the Solar Clipper series.

Dr. Nathan Lowell holds a Ph.D. in Educational Technology with specializations in Distance Education and Instructional Design. He also holds an M.A. in Educational Technology and a BS in Business Administration. He grew up on the south coast of Maine and is strongly rooted in the maritime heritage of the sea-farer. He served in the USCG from 1970 to 1975, seeing duty aboard a cutter on hurricane patrol in the North Atlantic and at a communications station in Kodiak, Alaska. He currently lives in the plains east of the Rocky Mountains with his wife and two children.

In an interview with Lindsay Buroker, he explains that he started his publishing as a self-published author at podiobooks in 2007, but later signed with Ridan Publishing.

Lowell has won the PARSEC Awards two times, in 2010 for the Captain's Share and 2011 for Owner's Share.

== Bibliography ==
Source:

== The Solar Clipper Universe ==
=== Trader's Tales From the Golden Age Of The Solar Clipper ===
1. Quarter Share
2. Half Share
3. Full Share
4. Double Share
5. Captain's Share
6. Owner's Share

=== Tales From The Deep Dark ===
- A Light In The Dark
- Dark Knight Station: Origins

=== Shaman’s Tales From the Golden Age Of The Solar Clipper ===
1. South Coast
2. Cape Grace
3. Finwell Bay

=== Seeker’s Tales From The Golden Age Of The Solar Clipper ===
1. In Ashes Born
2. To Fire Called
3. By Darkness Forged

=== Smuggler's Tales from the Golden Age of the Solar Clipper ===
1. Milk Run
2. Suicide Run
3. Home Run

=== SC Marva Collins From The Golden Age Of The Solar Clipper ===
1. School Days
2. Working Class
3. Hard Knocks

== Korlay ==
=== Tanyth Fairport Adventures ===
1. Ravenwood
2. Zypheria's Call
3. The Hermit of Lammas Wood

=== The Barbarians (with E. J. Lowell) ===
1. Salt

== Shackleford House ==
- The Wizard's Butler
- The Wizard's Cat

== Tales From The Archives Short Stories ==
- The Astonishing Amulet of Amenartas
