= Islands in the Sky =

1952 science fiction novel by Arthur C. Clarke

- Author: Arthur C. Clarke
- Illustrator: Gerard Quinn
- Cover artist: R. A. Smith
- Language: English
- Genre: Science fiction
- Publisher: Sidgwick & Jackson
- Publication date: 1952
- Publication place: United Kingdom
- Media type: Print (hardcover)
- Pages: 190

Islands in the Sky is a 1952 science fiction novel by British writer Arthur C. Clarke. It is one of his earliest works. Clarke wrote the story as a travelogue of human settlement of cislunar space in the last half of the twenty-first century.

This is one of the thirty-five juvenile novels that make up the Winston Science Fiction series that was published in the 1950s for a readership of teenagers. The typical protagonist in these books was a boy in his late teens who was proficient in the art of electronics, a hobby that was easily available to the readers. In this case, though, Roy Malcolm is an expert in aviation, its history, and its technology.

== Plot summary ==
At age sixteen, Roy Malcolm has made himself an expert in the history of aviation, so much so that he wins the Aviation Quiz Program, presented on television by World Airways, Inc. Because the prize was described as an all expenses paid trip to “any part of the earth” (rather than on Earth), Roy is able to request a trip to the Inner Station, which is considered part of Earth because its orbit lies under the one-thousand-kilometer limit of earth's legal territory.

Riding the rocketship Sirius out of Port Goddard in the high mountains of New Guinea, Roy goes to the Inner Station, five hundred miles above Earth, for a two-week stay. He is first taken to meet Commander Doyle, who introduces him to a team of apprentices. Their leader, Tim Benton, shows Roy around the station. For the rest of his time on the station Roy stays with the apprentices, studying with them and sharing their activities. After a few days they take him to the Morning Star, the now derelict, though refurbished, rocketship that had taken five men to Venus in 1985. The old rocketship serves as a clubhouse for the young men.

Because of the popularity of a TV series called Dan Drummond, Space Detective and one young man's pastime of trying to figure out how crime, especially piracy, could be profitable in space, Roy and his friends immediately become suspicious when the rocketship Cygnus and her secretive crew come to the Inner Station. Two of the apprentices go to investigate when the ship is left unattended and find that she's carrying what appear to be ray guns. It turns out that the ship belongs to a movie studio that intends to shoot the first movie filmed in space.

As his stay in space is coming to an end Roy gets to ride the Morning Star as she makes an emergency run to the Space Hospital with a seriously ill man. As Roy and his friends return to the Inner Station on a different ship they become so engrossed in Commander Doyle's story of his participation in the first expedition to Mercury that they fail to notice that their ship is off course: it's heading away from Earth rather than toward it. As they swing around the Moon they refuel their ship from a container catapulted to them from the crater Hipparchus, then they return to the Inner Station after making a short stop at one of the Relay Stations in geostationary orbit to get extra oxygen.

Roy has to spend several extra days at the Residential Station before he returns to Earth. There he meets the Moore family, Martian colonists coming to Earth so that the children can attend college. After listening to their talk about their home and seeing the pictures that they show him, Roy changes his future plans: he intends now that he will go beyond the space stations when he graduates from college and head out to the planets.

== Reception ==
Anthony Boucher and J. Francis McComas praised Islands in the Sky as "a detailedly plausible and accurate fictional tour". Floyd C. Gale called it "superbly detailed".
