= Robert S. Richardson =

American astronomer and science fiction writer

Robert Shirley Richardson (April 22, 1902 – November 12, 1981) was an American astronomer, born in Kokomo, Indiana. He also published science fiction using the pseudonym Philip Latham.

== Career ==
Philip Latham can support the suppositions that are the basis of his science fiction novels with accepted scientific theories. For he's an author who's in the business of "watching the stars." An astronomer at Mount Wilson and Palomar Observatories since 1931, he started writing for magazines in the early forties. His work won such wide respect that he now has a college textbook on astronomy to his credit. Movie producers as well as publishers find Mr. Latham's experience too good to pass up. He has given technical assistance to a number of studios on pictures such as Destination Moon, and he has written an article describing the work on the science fiction thriller When Worlds Collide.

— From the back flap of the dust jacket on Five Against Venus.

In his professional role he wrote about 10 books on astronomy. As Latham he wrote scripts for the early television series Captain Video as well as about 20 science-fiction stories. In one of these, N Day, an astronomer named Philip Latham is freed from his reclusive life by the knowledge that the sun is about to go nova.

== Bibliography ==
- "N-Day", 1943 (as Philip Latham)
- The Xi Effect, 1950 (as Philip Latham)
- Five Against Venus, 1952 (as Philip Latham)
- Missing Men of Saturn, 1953 (as Philip Latham)
- Second Satellite, 1956
- The Rose Bowl-Pluto Hypothesis published in Orbit (anthology series)
- The Fascinating World of Astronomy
