= Stephen Marlowe =

American novelist

Milton Lesser c.1953

Stephen Marlowe (born Milton Lesser, August 7, 1928 in Brooklyn, New York, died February 22, 2008 (aged 79), in Williamsburg, Virginia) was an American author of science fiction, mystery novels, and fictional autobiographies of Goya, Christopher Columbus, Miguel de Cervantes, and Edgar Allan Poe. He is best known for his detective character Chester Drum, whom he created for the 1955 novel The Second Longest Night. Lesser also wrote using the pseudonyms Adam Chase, Andrew Frazer, C.H. Thames, Jason Ridgway, Stephen Wilder, and Ellery Queen.

== Biography ==
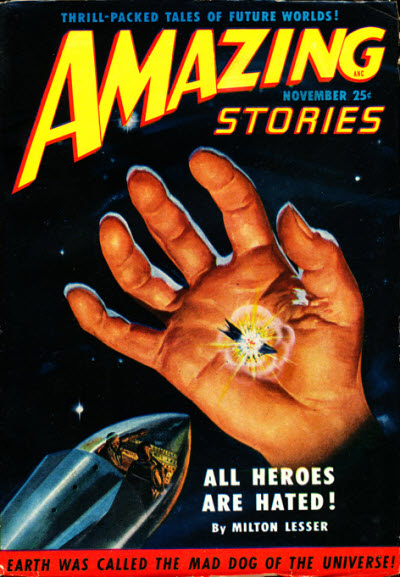
Lesser's novella "All Heroes Are Hated!" was the cover story for the November 1950 issue of Amazing Stories.

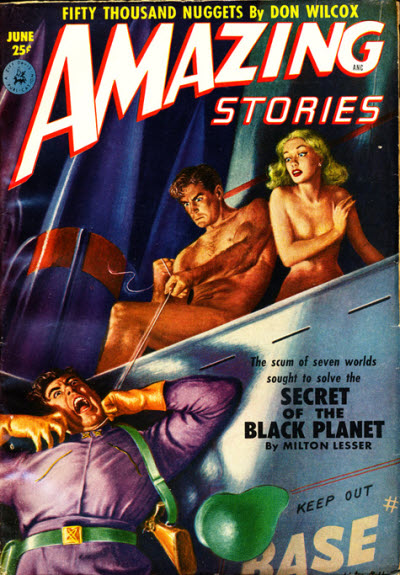
Lesser's short novel "Secret of the Black Planet" was the cover story for the June 1952 issue of Amazing Stories.

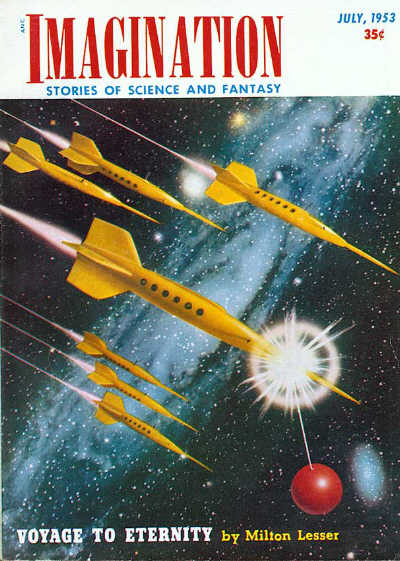
Lesser's novella "Voyage to Eternity" was cover-featured for the July 1953 issue of Imagination.

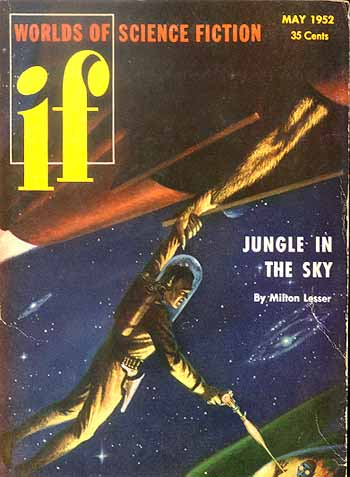
Lesser's novella "Jungle in the Sky" was the cover story in the second issue of If in May 1953.

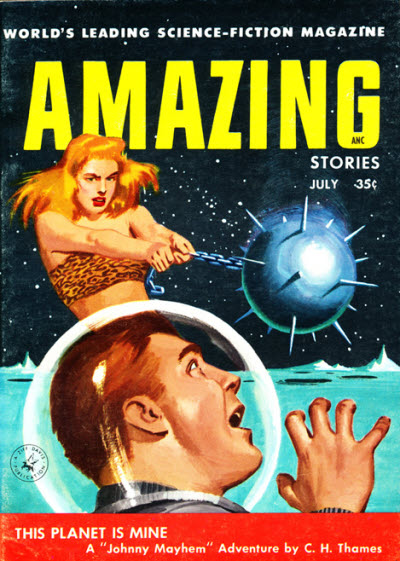
As "C. H. Thames", Lesser wrote the "Johnny Mayhem" stories, which were published in magazine Amazing during the 1950s but were not collected until 2013.

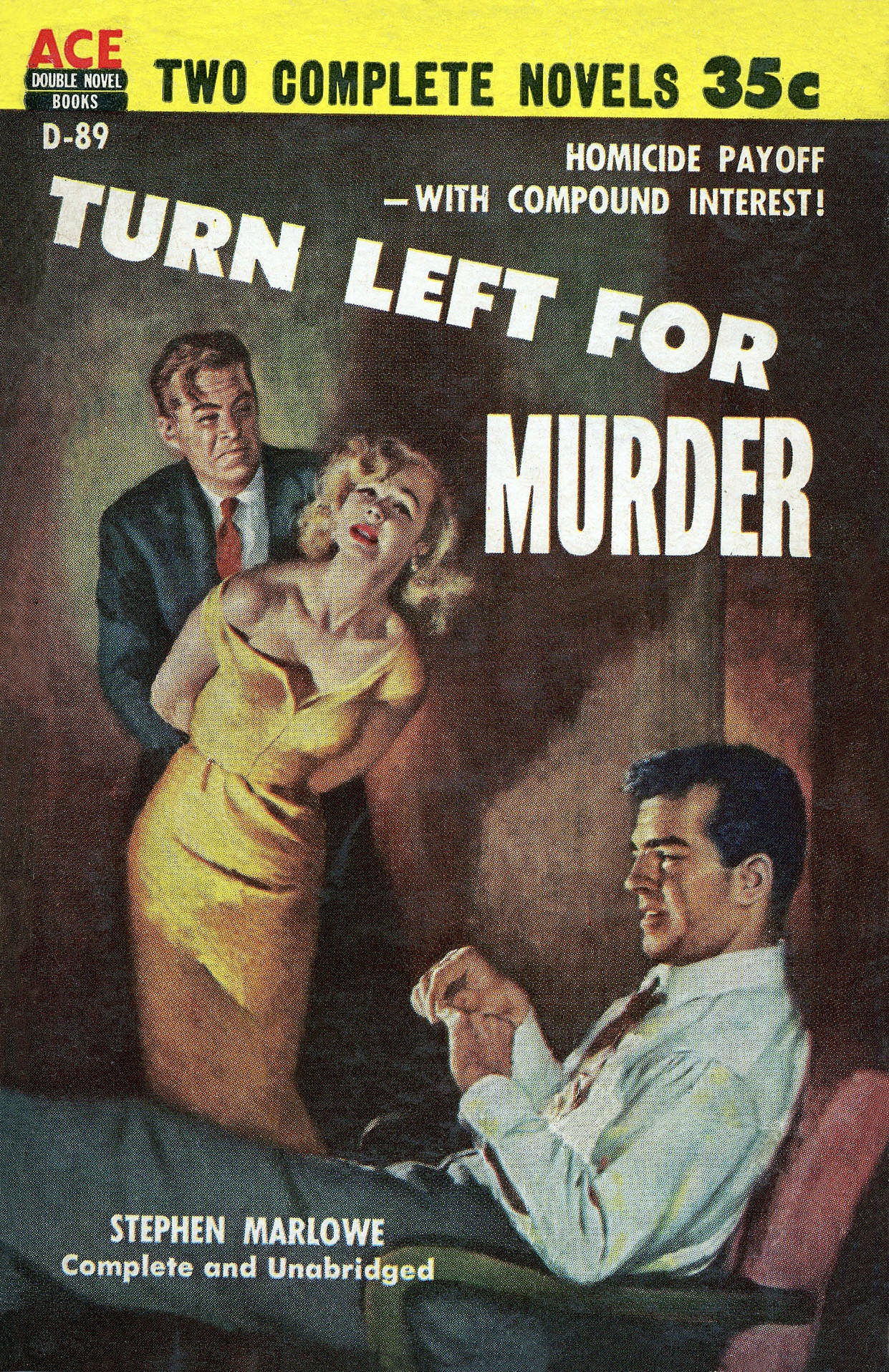
As "Stephen Marlowe", Lesser wrote several mystery novels.

Lesser attended the College of William & Mary, earning his degree in philosophy, marrying Leigh Lang soon after graduating. He was drafted into the U.S. Army during the Korean War. He and his wife divorced in 1962.

He was awarded the French Prix Gutenberg du Livre in 1988 for The Memoirs of Christopher Columbus, and in 1997 he was awarded the Life Achievement Award by the Private Eye Writers of America. He also served on the board of directors of the Mystery Writers of America.

In the later part of his life he lived with his second wife Ann in Williamsburg, Virginia.

== Selected bibliography ==
As Milton S. Lesser:

- Somewhere I'll Find You (1947)
- It's Raining Frogs! (1950)
- Pen Pal (1951)
- The Sense of Wonder (1951)
- The Old Way (1956)
- Earthbound (1952)
- Ride the Crepe Ring (1952)
- Jungle in the Sky (1952)
- The One and the Many (1952)
- Black Eyes and the Daily Grind (1952)
- Voyage To Eternity (1953)
- Earthsmith (1953)
- Picnic (1953)
- World Without Glamor (1953)
- Finders Keepers (1953)
- The Star Seekers (1953)
- Quickie (1954)
- Tyrants of Time (1954)
- Pariah (1954)
- A Cold Night for Crying (1954)
- Revolt of the Outworlds (1954)
- The Dictator (1955)
- Newshound (1955)
- No-Risk Planet (1955)
- The Cosmic Snare (1956)
- The Graveyard of Space (1956)
- My Sweetheart's the Man in the Moon (1956)
- Recruit for Andromeda (1959)
- Divvy up (1960)
- Stadium Beyond the Stars (1960)
- Spacemen Go Home (1961)
- Secret of the Black Planet (1965)

As Stephen Marlowe:

- Fugue (1951)
- Resurrection Seven (1952)
- Slaves to the Metal Horde (1954)
- Catch the Brass Ring (1954)
- Es Percipi (1955)
- Model for Murder (1955)
- Turn Left for Murder (1955)
- Prison of a Billion Years (1956)
- My Shipmate—Columbus (1956)
- Dead on Arrival (1956)
- Excitement for sale (1957)
- Blonde Bait (1959)
- Passport to Peril (1959)
- The Shining (1961)
- Colossus: A novel about Goya and a world gone mad (1965)
- The Search for Bruno Heidler (1966)
- Come Over, Red Rover (1968)
- The Summit (1970)
- The Man with No Shadow (1974)
- The Cawthorn Journals (or Too Many Chiefs) (1975)
- Translation (1976)
- The Valkyrie Encounter (1978)
- Deborah's Legacy (1983)
- The Memoirs of Christopher Columbus (1987)
- The Death and Life of Miguel De Cervantes (1991)
- The Lighthouse at the End of the World (1995)

Chester Drum novels (as Stephen Marlowe):

- The Second Longest Night (1955)
- Mecca for Murder (1956)
- Killers Are My Meat (1957)
- Murder Is My Dish (1957)
- Trouble Is My Name (1957)
- Terror Is My Trade (1958)
- Violence Is My Business (1958)
- Double in Trouble (with Richard S. Prather, co-starring Prather's series character Shell Scott) (1959)
- Homicide Is My Game (1959)
- Danger Is My Line (1960)
- Death Is My Comrade (1960)
- Peril Is My Pay (1960)
- Manhunt Is My Mission (1961)
- Jeopardy Is My Job (1962)
- Francesca (1963)
- Drum Beat - Berlin (1964)
- Drum Beat - Dominique (1965)
- Drum Beat - Madrid (1966)
- Drum Beat - Erica (1967)
- Drum Beat - Marianne (1968)

As Adam Chase:

- Summer Snow Storm (1956)
- Home is Where You Left It (1957)
- Quest of the Golden Ape (1959)

As Andrew Frazer:

- Find Eileen Hardin - Alive! (1959)
- The Fall of Marty Moon (1960)

As Jason Ridgway:

- West Side Jungle (1958)
- Adam's Fall (1960)
- People in Glass Houses (1961)
- Hardly a Man Is Now Alive (1962)
- The Treasure of the Cosa Nostra (1966)

As Ellery Queen

- Dead Man's Tale (1961)

As C. H. Thames:

- A Place in the Sun (1956)
- Violence Is Golden (1956)
- Planet of Doom (1956)
- Forever We Die! (1956)
- World of the Hunter (1956)
- Revolt of the Brains (1956)
- Think Yourself to Death (1957)
- World Beyond Pluto (1958)
- Blood of My Brother (1963)

As Darius John Granger:

- A World Called Crimson (1956)
- An eye for the ladies (1956)
- We Run From the Hunted! (1956)
- Stop, You're Killing Me! (1956)
- The Thing in the Truck (1956)
- Centauri Vengeance (1956)
- Disaster Revisited (1957)

As Stephen Wilder:

- The passionate pitchman (1956)
