= Marooned on Mars =

1952 novel by Lester del Rey

Marooned On Mars
- First edition
- Author: Lester del Rey
- Illustrator: Alex Schomburg
- Cover artist: Paul Orban
- Language: English
- Genre: Science fiction novel
- Publisher: John C. Winston
- Publication date: 1952
- Publication place: United States
- Media type: Print (hardcover, paperback)
- Pages: 210

Marooned on Mars is a juvenile science fiction novel written by American writer Lester del Rey. It was published by John C. Winston Co. in 1952 with illustrations by Alex Schomburg.

Marooned on Mars was commissioned as one of the first five volumes in Winston Science Fiction, a series of 35 novels published in the 1950s for a readership of teen-aged boys. The typical protagonist in these books was a boy in his late teens who was proficient in the art of electronics, a hobby that was easily available to the readers.

== Premise ==
The plot device that makes the story possible is the use of nuclear rockets drawing their power from "cans of plutonium" and using an acidic liquid propellant. Such rockets make space travel seem to work on a level similar to that of aviation in the late 1920s, when cross-country flights were fairly common and transoceanic flights were just beginning to be made. In the story flights between Earth and the Moon are common and the first interplanetary flight is being flown.

== Plot summary ==
In the foreword, "Tomorrow’s World", the author comments on how the development of liquid-fueled rockets points to missions to the Moon and establishment of a lunar base in the near future. Then he points to Mars as the next obvious step in the exploration of the Solar System. He mentions the possibility of life on Mars, recapping what astronomers knew about Mars in 1952, and speculates on what explorers, like those in his story, will find.

After spending two weeks on Earth for testing, Chuck Svenson returns home to the Moon to prepare for his part in the first expedition to Mars, as the ship's radar operator and communications technician. Jeff pilots the small, fast rocket ship that was sent to pick Chuck up from the spaceport high in the Andes. While they wait to take off Jeff receives a message telling him that the Mars expedition's take-off date has been moved up to enable the ship to avoid a flock of meteors that lunar radar has detected.

Although Jeff seems perturbed by the message, the full meaning of it does not register with Chuck until they land on the Moon: the Mars-bound rocket is now scheduled to blast off the day before Chuck's eighteenth birthday, which means that he cannot go. In spite of everything Governor Braithwaite can do, Chuck has been replaced on rocket ship Eros by a slightly older man, Lewis Wong.

Acting on hints from Jeff, Chuck stows away on Eros, hiding in the section holding the ship's hydroponic gardens. With its six-man crew and one stowaway on board, the ship blasts off from the Moon and the pilot Nat Rothman quickly puts it onto a Hohmann transfer orbit that will take the expedition to Mars. All too quickly Chuck is discovered by the ship's engineer, Richard Steele, and taken to the ship's captain and the expedition's leader, Miles Vance. Officially Chuck is under arrest and Vance chides him for taking one-seventh of each of the other men's supplies. Unofficially, though, every member of the crew is delighted with the stunt and even the people on the Moon and Earth find cause to cheer. The celebratory atmosphere does not last long.

As Eros passes in front of the flock of meteors that lunar radar had spotted, it runs into what the lunar radar could not see – a cloud of much smaller particles surrounding the larger pieces of space debris. Two of the particles, pebbles smaller than peas, hit the ship and penetrate it. The second one goes through the ship's electronic controls and damages them. Now Chuck and Lewis will spend the rest of the trip to Mars repairing them.

The repair job is complicated by the discovery of an unknown component in the wreckage of the control system. It had been inserted by an engineer who died in an auto accident before he could provide proper documentation for the device. Chuck and Lewis have to figure out how it works, repair it, and then calibrate it before they can land on Mars.

After making two attempts, in which he nearly loses control of the ship, Rothman brings the ship down on the Martian surface on the third attempt only to have one of the landing legs give way and leave the ship to fall over onto its side. By luck everyone survives the crash and Dr. Paul Sokolsky has little to do but tend to minor cuts and abrasions. After checking the damage and making some urgent repairs they discover that they have ninety days in which to make major repairs that Steele estimates will take five to six months.

Before they get down to the task of getting the ship ready to return to Earth, the men take a break. Dr. Sokolsky discovers plants, which explains why the thin atmosphere contains oxygen: they can replace the tanks on their spacesuits with battery-operated compressors and spend more time outside the ship. They also discover ruins and artwork depicting humanoid Martians, apparently long gone. It takes them a week to get the ship lifted just enough that they can begin repairing the broken structure well enough to lift the ship fully upright and prepare for take-off.

As a means of boosting morale, Chuck and Dr. Sokolsky are sent on a two-day hike to check out one of the canals, finding that it is actually a vine-like plant growing in a broad band across the planet's surface. On the way they catch glimpses of wide-eyed animals at night and wake up to find that some of their possessions are missing. When they return to the ship they discover that a number of tools have gone missing. As tools keep disappearing the men get desperate and eventually decide to go to the ruins to search for them. When they return they find the ship has been tilted over again and that the winches have been destroyed. They conclude that the Martians are not hostile, but simply want the men to stay.

After setting a trap Chuck follows a Martian into the ruins and then down into a maze of tunnels under the old city. There he is captured by the rodent-like humanoid creatures. The elder of the group introduces himself as Sptz-Rrll and shows Chuck the broken copper impeller of a rotary air compressor. The Martians have been trying to repair it with one of the welders they have taken from the spaceship. After the Martians leave in response to a call Chuck frees himself and takes the welder. Before he leaves he repairs the impeller. As he tries to find his way out he is recaptured by the Martians.

Seeing the repaired impeller, Sptz-Rrll frees Chuck and, accompanied by over fifty other Martians, takes Chuck back to the ship along with all the stolen tools. In the ship, using a notepad and pencil to draw diagrams, Sptz-Rrll offers the help of his people in preparing the ship to return to Earth and Steele offers to leave much of the ship's unnecessary equipment behind for the Martians. Later trade between Earth and Mars will bring new drugs from Martian plants to Earth and material from Earth will enable the Martians to revive their dying civilization and expand it.

== Reception ==
P. Schuyler Miller reviewed the novel favorably in Astounding, noting it was marked by the "touch of reality."
