= Five Against Venus =

1952 novel by Philip Latham

- First edition cover
- Author: Philip Latham
- Illustrator: Alex Schomburg (endpapers)
- Cover artist: Virgil Finlay
- Language: English
- Genre: science fiction novel
- Published: April 14, 1952
- Publisher: John C. Winston Company
- Publication place: United States
- Media type: Print (hardcover)
- Pages: vii+214
- OCLC: 1374703

Five Against Venus, written by Philip Latham, is a science-fiction novel first published in the United States in 1952 by the John C. Winston Company. Philip Latham was the nom de plume of Robert S. Richardson, a professional astronomer who also provided technical assistance on movies such as Destination Moon and wrote scripts for the Captain Video television series.

This is one of the thirty-five juvenile novels that comprise the Winston Science Fiction set, which novels were published in the 1950s for a readership of teenage boys. The typical protagonist in these books was a boy in his late teens who was proficient in the art of electronics, a hobby that was easily available to the readers. In this novel, Bruce Robinson differs from that pattern in having no special skill, only a knowledge of astronomy.

Under the article on Venus in the Encyclopedia of Science Fiction, the writer says that "Philip Latham's Five Against Venus (1952) is a Venusian Robinsonade." Indeed, in overall form the story is Swiss Family Robinson in space, though the precipitating crisis owes more to the 1950 movie Rocketship X-M.

== Characters ==
- Paul Robinson: headed for a new job on the moon, he never dreamed that he would be the leader of an impromptu expedition to another planet.
- Helen Robinson: an ordinary American housewife who must regain the pioneer spirit to set up housekeeping in an alien environment.
- Bruce Robinson: sixteen years old, he yearns to travel in space, but then finds that it is not what he expected.
- Frank Robinson: six years old, he only wants to play with the strange machine retrieved from the wreckage of the spaceship.
- Jim Gregor: pilot/navigator of the deep-space ship Aurora, he performs the ultimate act of courage to save the lives of his ship's passengers.
- Dr. Bram Simmons: an eccentric scientist, he went to Venus by himself five years ago and was not heard from again – until now.

== Plot summary ==
After another boring day at Los Angeles High School, Bruce Robinson is delighted to hear that his long-unemployed father, Paul Robinson, has found a job – on the moon. A short time later the Robinson family boards the rocketship that will take them to meet the deep-space ship Sirius, which will take them to the moon. But as they approach the disc-shaped deep-space ship they see that, instead of Sirius, they will be riding the Aurora to the moon.

Once the Robinsons have boarded the Aurora and settled in, Bruce meets Jim Gregor, who shows him the ship's controls. Bruce and Gregor then join the engineer and the captain (neither man is named in the story) in the cargo hold to move some boxes. When one of the boxes breaks open and reveals a strange-looking machine, the captain warns Bruce never to tell anyone what he saw.

With the ship under way, Bruce develops a hunch that something has gone wrong. He sees that an emergency light has come on and informs Gregor. The pilot discovers that the ship's engines have been over-running and that the ship is on a course that will pass close to Venus (in the 1950 movie Rocketship X-M the over-running of the engines takes the lunar-bound ship to Mars). With insufficient propellant to return to Earth, Gregor attempts to make an emergency landing on a mountainside and dies in the crash. Prior to the crash, the captain and the engineer bail out in a rocket-propelled lifeboat.

Little more than shaken up in the crash, Bruce and his father recover supplies from the wrecked spaceship. The supplies include, to their astonishment, a pair of carbines and boxes of ammunition. Finding a cave next to a waterfall near the wreck, they move in and set up camp.

On several occasions Bruce hears a soft rustling and on others he hears a ringing in his ears and feels heat on his face. The other members of the family have similar experiences and they dismiss them as part of getting acclimatized to an alien environment.

With their supply of canned food running low, Paul and Bruce go hunting, assuming that Venusian animal life would be edible. They follow the stream coming out of their waterfall and soon find what appears to be an artificial enclosure woven from vines using trees as supports. Inside the improvised corral they encounter a creature similar to Diplodocus, but with a tame demeanor. They drive the docile creature toward their cave, intending to butcher it when they arrive, but change their decision and keep it as a pet after it saves Frank from a carnivorous plant.

Having brought samples of the tubers and the pear-like fruit that the beast had eaten, Paul and Bruce find them edible and the family begins eating them when their canned food runs out. Meanwhile, Paul is getting sick from the infection of a cut he suffered when he hit his arm against a rock. Later, after he has a good amount of sleep, Paul's arm heals, seemingly in spite of having been covered by the fast-growing green mold that grows on any and all organic substances.

While foraging for more tubers, Bruce hears a ringing in his ears, feels his face grow hot, and then loses consciousness. He is awakened by a strange man who introduces himself as Bram Simmons, a scientist who came to Venus alone five years earlier. Nearby stand several man-sized bat-like creatures whose ultrasonic emissions had knocked Bruce out. Simmons shoos the bat-men away and tells Bruce what kind of trouble he and his family are in. The bat-men are vampires, usually drawing blood from the dinosaur-like beasts kept in corrals around the area, and that there is a large colony of bat-men nearby.

After Bruce returns to the cave, as night is falling, the Robinsons come under attack. At first Paul and Bruce repel the attackers with their carbines, but then they run out of ammunition. As all seems lost, star shells and grenades explode in the valley below the cave, and the bat-men, thrown into confusion and distress, flee the scene: the space marines have landed.

Having assumed that no one survived the crash of the Aurora, the spacemen have come to retrieve the gadget that Aurora's captain had warned Bruce not to mention. It is a top-secret military machine — and Frank has been playing with it! With the machine in hand, the spacemen take the Robinsons back to Earth with them: Simmons chooses to stay on Venus, living with the bat-men.

At home the Robinsons have been hounded by reporters, but now their fame is waning. One man, though, seeks them out to offer them something. He represents a pharmaceutical company to which Bruce took samples of Venusian life, and he tells the Robinsons that the green mold that was such a nuisance produces an antibiotic more powerful than penicillin. He then tells the Robinsons that his company is offering them enough money to solve their financial problems for years to come.

== Backstage on Venus ==
"Backstage on Venus" is the title of Chapter 21, which serves as an appendix. As a professional astronomer the author knew everything that had been discovered or postulated about Venus up to 1952 and he described how he used that knowledge to set his stage.

== Publication history ==
- 1952 Feb, US, Five Against Venus, The John C. Winston Company (Winston Science Fiction #3), LCCCN 52–5496, hardcover (vii+214 pp)

== Reviews ==
The book was also reviewed by:

- George O. Smith in Space Science Fiction for November 1952
- an uncredited reviewer in Space Stories for October 1952
- Sam Merwin, Jr. in Amazing Stories for October 1952
- Groff Conklin in Galaxy Science Fiction for November 1952
- P. Schuyler Miller in Astounding Science Fiction for November 1952
- Robert W. Lowndes in Future Science Fiction for January 1953
