= Lester del Rey =

American science fiction author (1915–1993)

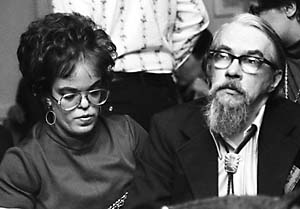
- Judy-Lynn and Lester del Rey at Minicon in Minneapolis, 1974
- Born: Leonard Knapp; June 2, 1915; Saratoga Township, Minnesota, U.S.
- Died: May 10, 1993 (aged 77); New York City, U.S.
- Occupations: Writer, editor
- Spouses: unknown (m. 1935; died 1935) Helen Schlaz (m. 1945; div. 1949) Evelyn Harrison (m. 1954; died 1970) Judy-Lynn Benjamin (m. 1971; died 1986)
- Writing career
- Pen name: John Alvarez, Marion Henry, Philip James, Philip St. John, Charles Satterfield, Erik van Lhin, Kenneth Wright
- Period: 1938–1991
- Genres: Fantasy, science fiction

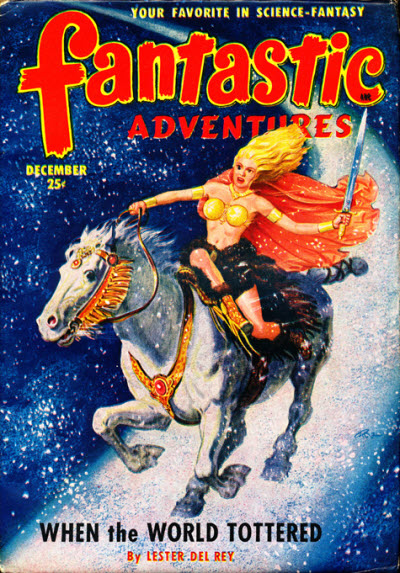
Del Rey's novella When the World Tottered was the cover story in the December 1950 issue of Fantastic Adventures, illustrated by Robert Gibson Jones

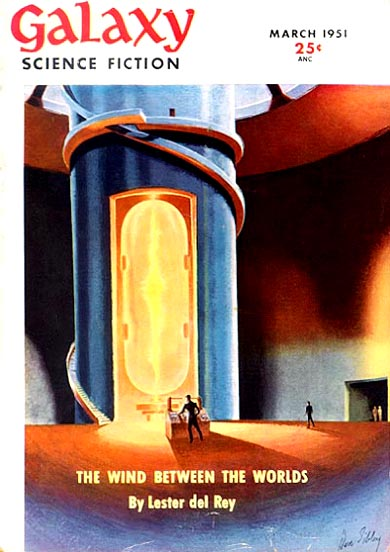
Del Rey's novelette "The Wind Between the Worlds" was the cover story in the March 1951 issue of Galaxy Science Fiction

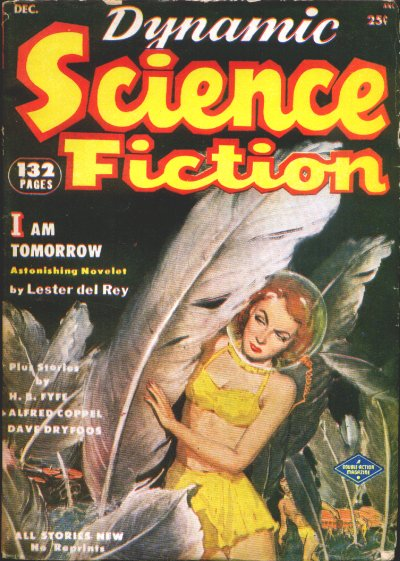
Del Rey's novelette "I Am Tomorrow" was the cover story in the debut issue of Dynamic Science Fiction in 1952

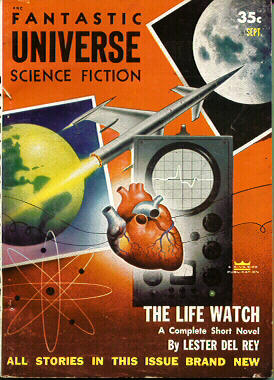
Del Rey's short novel The Life Watch took the cover of the September 1954 issue of Fantastic Universe

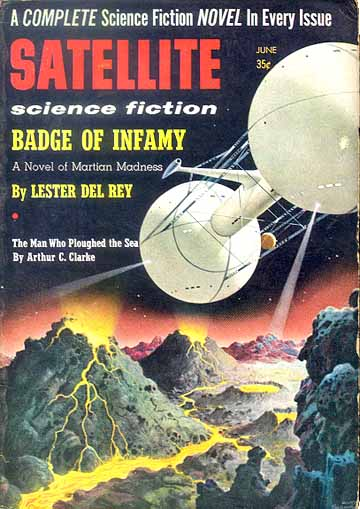
Del Rey's novel Badge of Infamy took the cover of the June 1957 issue of Satellite Science Fiction

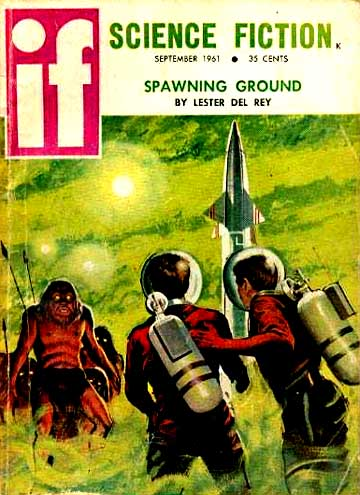
Del Rey's "Spawning Ground" was the cover story in the September 1961 issue of If

Leonard Knapp (June 2, 1915 – May 10, 1993), best known by his primary pseudonym Lester del Rey, was an American science fiction author and editor. He was the author of many books in the juvenile Winston Science Fiction series, and the fantasy editor at Del Rey Books, the fantasy and science fiction imprint of Ballantine Books (subsequently Random House), working for his fourth wife Judy-Lynn del Rey.

== Biography ==
=== Original name ===
Del Rey often told people that his real name was Ramon Felipe Alvarez-del Rey (and sometimes facetiously even Ramón Felipe San Juan Mario Silvio Enrico Smith Heartcourt-Brace Sierra y Alvarez del Rey y de los Verdes). However, his sister has confirmed that his name was in fact Leonard Knapp. He also claimed that his family was killed in a car accident in 1935. In reality, the accident only killed his first wife.

=== Career ===
==== Writing career ====
Del Rey first started publishing stories in pulp magazines in the late 1930s, at the dawn of the so-called Golden Age of Science Fiction. He was associated with the most prestigious science fiction magazine of the era, Astounding Science Fiction, from the time its editor John W. Campbell published his first short story in the April 1938 issue: "The Faithful", already under the name Lester del Rey. The December 1938 issue featured his story "Helen O'Loy" which was selected for the prestigious anthology The Science Fiction Hall of Fame. By the end of 1939 he had also placed stories in Weird Tales (edited by Farnsworth Wright) and Unknown (Campbell), which featured more horror and more fantasy respectively.

During a period when del Rey's work was not selling well, he worked as a short order cook at the White Tower Restaurant in New York. After he married his second wife, Helen Schlaz, in 1945, he quit that job to write full-time.

In 1952, his first three novels were published in the Winston juvenile series, one of which (Rocket Jockey) appearing in an Italian-language edition in the same year. In the 1950s, del Rey was one of the main authors writing science fiction for adolescents, along with Robert A. Heinlein and Andre Norton. During this time some of his fiction was published under multiple pseudonyms, including Philip St. John and Erik van Lhin.

He continued publishing novels, as well as short fiction, both under his primary pseudonym Lester del Rey as well as a number of other pen names, at a fast pace through the 1950s and the early sixties. His novel writing slowed down toward the end of the sixties, with his last novel, Weeping May Tarry (written with Raymond F. Jones) appearing from Pinnacle Books in 1978.

==== Editor and critic ====
After meeting Scott Meredith at the 1947 World Science Fiction Convention, he began working as a first reader for the new Scott Meredith Literary Agency, where he also served as office manager.

He later became an editor for several pulp magazines and then for book publishers. During 1952 and 1953, del Rey edited several magazines: Space SF, Fantasy Fiction, Science Fiction Adventures (as Philip St. John), Rocket Stories (as Wade Kaempfert), and Fantasy Fiction (as Cameron Hall). During this period he also edited several anthologies, notably editing the "Best Science Fiction Stories of the Year" series from 1972 to 1976.

Del Rey was most successful editing with his fourth wife, Judy-Lynn del Rey, at Ballantine Books (as a Random House property, post-Ballantine) where they established the fantasy and science fiction imprint Del Rey Books in 1977. He retired from the publishing house in February 1992.

In 1957, del Rey and Damon Knight co-edited a small amateur magazine named Science Fiction Forum. During a debate about symbolism within the magazine, del Rey accepted Knight's challenge to write an analysis of the James Blish story "Common Time" that showed the story was about a man eating a ham sandwich. After science fiction gained respectability and began to be taught in classrooms, del Rey stated that academics interested in the genre should "get out of my ghetto". Del Rey said that "to develop, science fiction had to remove itself from the usual critics who viewed it from the perspective of [the] mainstream, and who judged its worth largely on its mainstream values. As part of that mainstream, it would never have had the freedom to make the choices it did — many of them quite possibly wrong, but necessary for its development."

Starting in September 1969, he wrote the "Reading Room" review column for If, and following the demise of If in 1974, switched to writing the review column for Analog Science Fiction and Fact titled "The Reference Library".

Del Rey was a member of a literary banqueting club, the Trap Door Spiders, which served as the basis of Isaac Asimov's fictional group of mystery solvers, the Black Widowers. Del Rey was the model for "Emmanuel Rubin".

=== Death ===
Lester del Rey died on May 10, 1993, at New York Hospital at the age of 77 after a brief illness.

== Style ==
"There is no writer in this field who is more steadfast in practicing the rule that fiction is first of all entertainment", Algis Budrys said in 1965. Reporting that the stories in a collection of del Rey's fiction could not be dated by reading them, Budrys stated that he had remained a successful writer because "del Rey has remained his own individual ... he writes for himself, and his readers". Budrys said that

The typical del Rey character is an individual who is trying to do the decent thing to the best of his ability. The typical del Rey story problem is that of a good and faithful being trying to understand a complex situation which prevents his immediately knowing the decent thing to do. When he writes a story whose problem becomes apparent only in the last paragraphs, this is frequently the nature of his "trick" ending—the mood is not shock but sorrow; the payoff is not in some irrevocable destruction of this personality but in the reader's realization that even a decent individual must pay the price of ignorance. Normally, del Rey even then leaves an opening for the protagonist to grow and go on in, and even his worst losers retrieve something—call it dignity.

== Awards ==
Del Rey was awarded the 1972 E. E. Smith Memorial Award for Imaginative Fiction (the "Skylark") by the New England Science Fiction Association for "contributing significantly to science fiction, both through work in the field and by exemplifying the personal qualities that made the late "Doc" Smith well-loved by those who knew him". He also won a special 1985 Balrog Award for his contributions to fantasy, voted by fans and organized by Locus magazine. The Science Fiction Writers of America named him its 11th SFWA Grand Master in 1990, presented 1991.

== Selected works ==
=== Novels ===
==== Jim Stanley series ====
- Step to the Stars (1954)
- Mission to the Moon (1956)
- Moon of Mutiny (1961)

==== Other novels ====
- Marooned on Mars (1952)
- Rocket Jockey as Philip St. John (1952)
- A Pirate Flag for Monterey (1952)
- Attack from Atlantis (1953)
- Battle on Mercury as Erik Van Lhin (1953)
- The Mysterious Planet as Kenneth Wright (1953)
- Rockets to Nowhere as Philip St. John (1954)
- For I Am a Jealous People (1954)
- Preferred Risk (1955) with Frederik Pohl [as by Edson McCann]
- Nerves (1956) [Expansion of 1942 novella; revised in 1976]
- Police Your Planet as Erik Van Lhin (1956)
- Day of the Giants (1959)
- The Eleventh Commandment (1962)
- Outpost of Jupiter (1963)
- The Sky Is Falling (1963)
- Badge of Infamy (1963)
- Pstalemate / Psi (1971)
- Weeping May Tarry (1978) with Raymond F. Jones

==== Collaborations with Paul W. Fairman ====
These seven novels were ghost-written by Fairman based on outlines by del Rey, and published as by del Rey.

- The Runaway Robot (1965)
- The Infinite Worlds of Maybe (1966)
- Rocket from Infinity (1966)
- The Scheme of Things (1966)
- Siege Perilous (1966)
- Tunnel Through Time (1966)
- Prisoners of Space (1968)

=== Short fiction collections ===
- ... And Some Were Human (1948)
- Robots and Changelings (1957)
- The Sky Is Falling and Badge of Infamy (1966)
- Mortals and Monsters (1965)
- Gods and Golems (1973)
- The Early del Rey (1975)
- The Early del Rey: Vol 1 (1976)
- The Early del Rey: Vol 2 (1976)
- The Best of Lester del Rey (1978)
- War and Space (2009)
- Robots and Magic (2010)

=== Nonfiction ===
- Rockets Through Space (1957)
- Space Flight, General Mills, Inc. 1958, 1957; Golden Press, 1959
- The Mysterious Earth (1960)
- The Mysterious Sea (1961)
- Rocks and What They Tell Us (1961)
- The Mysterious Sky (1964)
- The World of Science Fiction, 1926–1976: the History of a Subculture (1979)

=== As editor ===
- The Year After Tomorrow with Carl Carmer and Cecile Matschat (1954)
- Best Science Fiction of the Year #1–5 (1972–1976)
- Once Upon a Time: A Treasury of Modern Fairy Tales with Risa Kessler (1991)
