= Mel Hunter =

American illustrator (1927–2004)

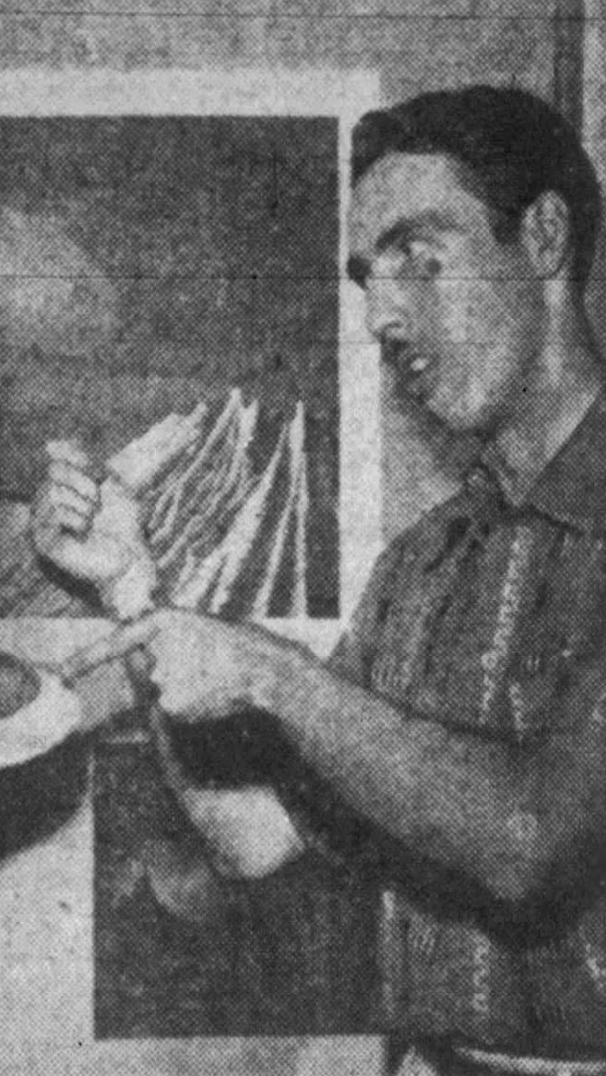
- Hunter, pictured 1953
- Born: July 27, 1927; Oak Park, Illinois, United States
- Died: February 20, 2004 (aged 76); Ferrisburgh, Vermont, United States
- Education: Attended Northwestern University, Evanston, Illinois
- Occupation: Scientific illustrator
- Known for: Science fiction illustration
- Spouse: Susan Smith-Hunter
- Children: 3

Milford "Mel" Joseph Hunter (July 27, 1927 – February 20, 2004) was a 20th-century American illustrator. He enjoyed a successful career as a science fiction illustrator, producing illustrations for famous science fiction authors such as Isaac Asimov and Robert A. Heinlein, as well as a technical and scientific illustrator for clients such as The Pentagon, Hayden Planetarium, and the Massachusetts Audubon Society.

== Biography ==
=== Early life ===
Mel Hunter was born July 27, 1927, in Oak Park, Illinois, to Milford and Lucille (née Clarkson) Hunter. He was physically and psychologically abused by his father. "He never knew his mother because she was banished from the household by his father when he was only two years old. While he never forgot the abuse, he didn't seem to dwell on it. Instead, he poured himself into his work and career," according to his third wife, Susan Smith-Hunter.

Hunter entered college a year early, at Northwestern University in Evanston, Illinois. After college he held a variety of odd jobs, but finally landed a draftsman job at Northrop Aircraft Corp in California. In 1950, Hunter decided to pursue a career in art and began to teach himself illustration in his spare time.

=== Science Fiction Illustration ===
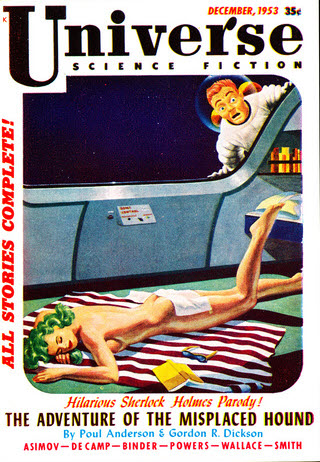
"Sunbathing in Space", 1953

With a growing understanding of the fields of astronomy, astronautics, and aviation Hunter set out to teach himself book and magazine illustration. He moved to New York City during the early 1950s, and by 1953 he had successfully sold his first color cover to Galaxy Science Fiction magazine and talked himself into a technical illustrator at Northrop Aircraft where he painted illustrations of advanced aircraft and simulated combat scenarios.

During that time, the most lucrative outlet for space artists was the science fiction genre. Along with a fertile imagination, Hunter coupled his art with realism and technical accuracy. Hunter's whimsical science fiction robots became his signature to thousands of science fiction fans; the skeletal steel robots graced the covers of The Magazine of Fantasy & Science Fiction well into the 1970s. Hunter's lonely robots were often depicted walking solo through the desolate landscapes of nuclear ruins or alien planets.

Hunter was nominated for the Hugo Award for Best Professional Artist for the years 1960–1962.

=== Technical and Scientific Illustration ===
Sample of Mel Hunter's scientific illustration.

As Hunter's science fiction career blossomed, so did his technical and scientific illustrations. Hunter's love of air and space took him from California's desert runways to Florida's seacoast launchpads to illustrate every variety of jet-age aircraft and space-age rocket imaginable—from X-15 to Saturn V.

One of Hunter's best-known books is "The Missilemen", a photo illustrated work published in 1960 by Doubleday. Hunter visited U.S. rocket and missile sites during the late 1950s; he took all of the book's black-and-white photographs. It was a rare look inside the world of rocket scientists and engineers of the early Space Age. Another Hunter book, "Strategic Air Command", received the Aviation Writers' Association highest honors in 1961.

"Mel launched a career in scientific illustration after he was an established science-fiction illustrator," said Smith-Hunter. "He was very technically accurate and was commissioned to complete 26 paintings of celestial objects for the Hayden Planetarium in New York City."

=== Naturalistic lithography ===
An original lithography by Mel Hunter.

After 17 years of technical and scientific illustration, Hunter moved from New York to Chester, Vermont in 1967. He began creating lithographic prints depicting the natural scenes which surrounded him. The following year, he was commissioned to create a series of more than 130 watercolors of "Birds of the Northeast" by Abercrombie & Fitch Galleries and Massachusetts Audubon Society. By 1970, Hunter signed a contract with World Publishing Co. for a series of 13 ecological books for children, dealing with topics like the beginning of the earth, mankind, plants, birds, mammals and insects.

In 1976, after accidental damage to his limestone lithographic drawing, Hunter began using Mylar as a medium for his lithography, and published a controversial photo-illustrated article in the American Artist Magazine titled "Revolution in Hand-Drawn Lithography". In 1984, Hunter published his hardcover textbook, The New Lithography, detailing the "Mylar Method" still in wide use today.

=== Personal life and death ===
Hunter married Nancy O'Connor in July 1969. The couple had three children, and divorced in March 1985. He then married Susan Harriet Smith in September 1986.

Although diagnosed with Parkinson's disease in the 1990s, Hunter died of bone cancer in February 2004. True to his final wish, his cremated remains were launched into space on May 22, 2012.

== See also ==
- Winston Science Fiction
