= Son of the Stars =

1952 novel by Raymond F. Jones

- Author: Raymond F. Jones
- Cover artist: Alex Schomburg
- Language: English
- Genre: Science fiction
- Published: 1952 (The John C. Winston Company)
- Publication place: United States
- Pages: 210
- Followed by: Planet of Light

Son of the Stars is a science fiction novel by American writer by Raymond F. Jones, first published in the United States in 1952 by The John C. Winston Company.

This is one of the thirty-five juvenile novels that comprise the Winston Science Fiction set, which novels were published in the 1950s for a readership of teen-aged boys. The typical protagonist in these books was a boy in his late teens who was proficient in the art of electronics, a hobby that was easily available to the readers. In this story Ron Barron is typical in having a ham radio set up in a shed in the back yard of his parents' house.

== Plot ==
Early one morning sixteen-year-old Ron Barron, accompanied by his pet collie, Pete, drives his hot rod out of the small town of Longview and up into the nearby hills. He is hunting for the object that his automatic meteor tracker had detected in the wee hours of that morning. After half a day of fruitless searching he finds what he was seeking, but it is not what he expected.

It is the wreckage of a ship, a disc-shaped vessel two hundred feet wide and forty feet thick at the center. As he examines the ship, Ron encounters the lone survivor of the crash, a boy about his age, who has six fingers on each hand. Ron is wary at first, but Pete is friendly toward the alien, so Ron relaxes his wariness and takes the injured boy, still in shock, home with him.

There he finds his girlfriend, Anne Martin, waiting to chide him over a missed tennis date. As he takes the alien boy into the house and up to the guest bedroom, Anne takes his car to get Doc Smithers, the Barrons' family physician.

Smithers cleans and treats the boy's wounds as best he can and confirms the obvious: The boy is not of this Earth. With the boy awake, Ron introduces himself, Anne, and Doc Smithers to him through the simple point-and-say. The boy introduces himself as Clonar and shows a strange aptitude for picking up English in its proper form. At about the same time Pete brings Clonar a package of raw hamburger that he took from the refrigerator and Clonar eats it eagerly, giving himself the protein that he needs to heal properly. He then goes to sleep.

Ron's parents are astonished when they come home and find out what happened. His mother, identified only as Mrs. Barron, is horrified. His father, George Barron, a lawyer, takes a more tolerant view, not quite trusting Pete's judgement of Clonar, but willing to give Clonar a small benefit of the doubt. He intends to resolve the matter by turning it over to an acquaintance of his, Colonel Middleton at Crocker Air Force Base, some fifty miles from Longview.

Over the next few days Ron and Anne teach Clonar more English, which he picks up with astounding rapidity. By way of an astronomy book they learn that Clonar's home lies somewhere in the Andromeda Galaxy. Clonar also confirms Ron's suspicion that he has been communicating with Pete, that his people have a slight telepathic ability to share simple thoughts with animals.

Two days after Ron found the wreck, he and Clonar return to it intending to bury the bodies of the crew, including those of Clonar's father and brother. They find that the ship has been taken over by a military unit commanded by Captain Hornsby, a self-important opportunist devoted to practical realism, a cynical and amoral doctrine that imputes value only to things of immediate benefit. After Clonar gives Ron and Hornsby a tour of what's left of the ship the three of them come to a room where technicians are preparing the bodies of the crew for dissection. Outraged by the desecration, Clonar goes berserk, seriously injuring several men before the rest bring him down and beat him unconscious.

Lieutenant General Gillispie comes from Washington to take over command of the project from Col. Middleton. He immediately pulls Hornsby and his men out of the ship and reprimands them for their behavior, but not before technicians have disassembled the ship's hyperwave radio, which Clonar could have used to call the fleet, which is presumably still looking for the lost ship. He also allows Ron and Anne to visit Clonar, who is effectively imprisoned in a Veterans Administration hospital. Other visitors try to obtain information from Clonar, but when Clonar finds out that Gillispie tried to get Ron and Anne to interrogate him, he escapes from the hospital and disappears.

Nearly a week after Clonar disappears, Anne conceives the idea of asking Pete to find him, assuming that he still has a telepathic link to him. Pete leads Ron and Anne to a hidden compartment in the wrecked spaceship and there they find Clonar, unwilling to have anything further to do with Earth people. He has found several lifeboats intact and is trying to modify their hyperwave radios to call for a rescue ship.

Later that night Ron gets a call from Clonar on his ham radio. Clonar made his hyperwave radios work, but they don't have enough power to send a signal to the alien fleet. With Gillispie's help, Ron and Clonar get permission to use the transmitters at Crocker Air Force Base to boost Clonar's signal. After days of feverish and desperate work, Clonar makes contact with the fleet commander, who sends a scout ship to pick up Clonar and take him home.

== Publication history ==
- 1952, US, John C. Winston Co., Pub. date Jan 1952, Hardback (210 pp)
- 1954, United Kingdom, Hutchinson, Hardback (216 pp)
