= Alex Schomburg =

Puerto Rican commercial and comic-book artist (1905–1998)

- Alex Schomburg, c. 1940s
- Born: Alejandro Schomburg y Rosa; May 10, 1905 Aguadilla, Puerto Rico
- Died: April 7, 1998 (aged 92) Beaverton, Oregon, U.S.
- Areas: Penciller, Inker
- Pseudonym: Xela

Alexander A. Schomburg, born Alejandro Schomburg y Rosa (/ˈʃɒmbɜːrɡ/; May 10, 1905 – April 7, 1998), was a Puerto Rican commercial artist and comic-book artist and painter whose career lasted over 70 years.

== Biography ==
Alex Schomburg was born on May 10, 1905, in Aguadilla, Puerto Rico, as the son of Guillermo Schomburg, a civil engineer and land surveyor of German ancestry and Jewish ancestry, and Francisca Rosa. Alex Schomburg moved to New York City in 1917, where he joined his older brothers and attended public school. In 1923 he began work as a commercial artist with three of his brothers. In 1928, the brothers' partnership ended and Schomburg found work with the National Screen Service, creating lantern slides and working on movie trailers there through 1944.

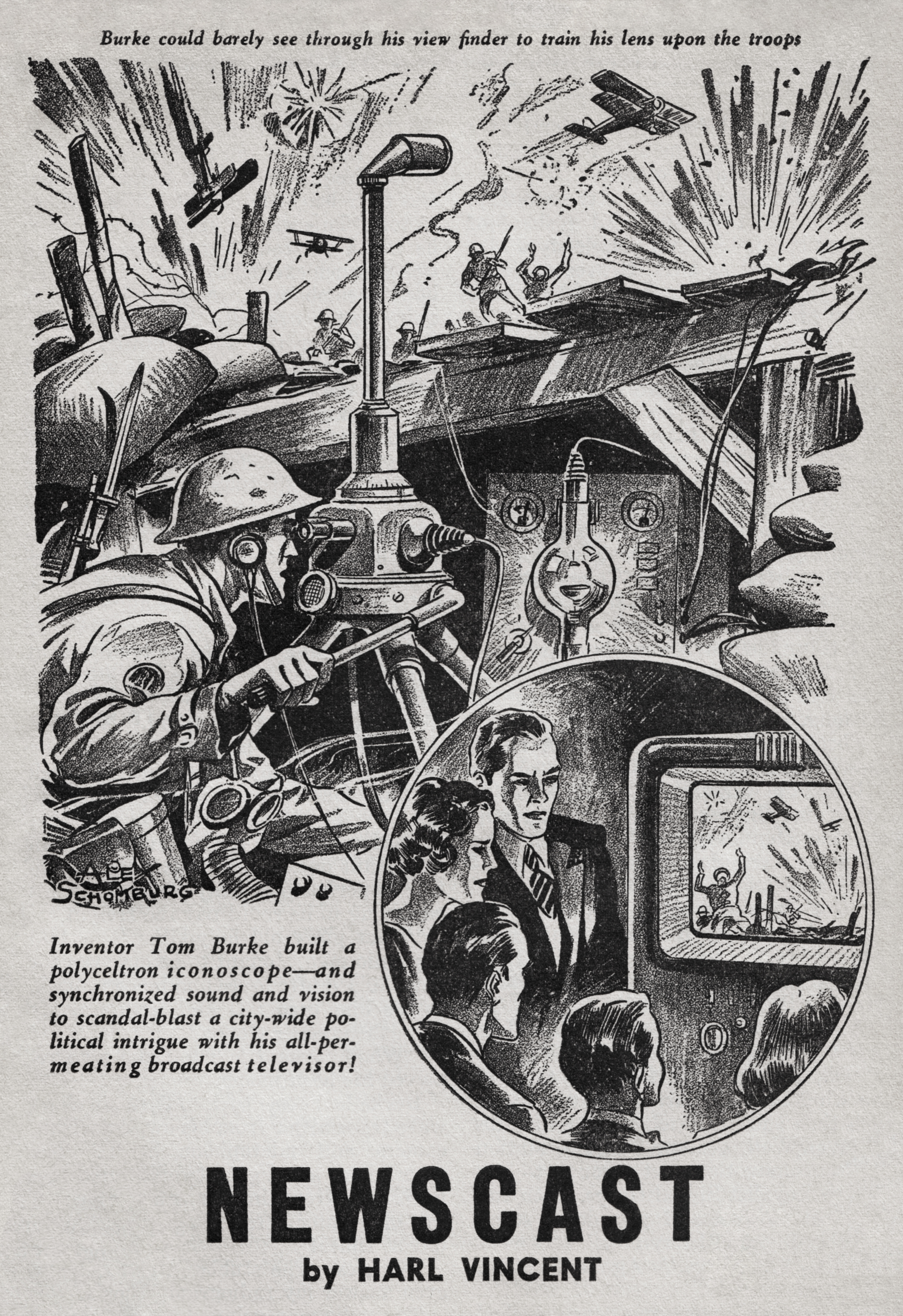
Illustration for Harl Vincent's Newscast in Marvel Science Stories (May 1939)

During the 1930s, in addition to working for the NSS, Schomburg freelanced with Better Publications, producing interior line art for Thrilling Wonder Stories and other of the company's pulp magazines. His skill at drawing anything mechanical soon had him illustrating aviation covers for Flying Aces and electronic equipment for the Hugo Gernsback pulp Radio Craft. Schomburg's first science fiction-themed cover was for the September 1939 issue of Startling Stories. As the artist recalled in 1939, "One day the publisher asked me to do an illustration for Thrilling Wonder Stories. I had always been interested in science fiction and they liked the way I handled the art work. I enjoy reading the story as much as doing the illustrations. In my opinion, an illustration is very important. For instance, give the same story to two different persons ... then ask them to picture a certain scene. You can bet they'll be entirely different."

The following decade, Schomburg freelanced primarily for Timely Comics, the 1940s forerunner of Marvel Comics, displaying his talent for action tableaux in covers featuring Captain America, the Sub-Mariner, the Human Torch, and other superheroes. His first recorded comic book work were two covers released the same month, for Daring Mystery Comics #1 and Marvel Mystery Comics #3 (both cover-dated Jan. 1940). Schomburg would draw most of Timely's covers, as well as a smattering of single-page interior illustrations, through Marvel Mystery Comics #76 (Sept. 1946). He also provided covers for Pines Publications, for titles including Exciting Comics and America's Best Comics, featuring such superheroes as the Black Terror and the Fighting Yank, as well as for Harvey Comics, including the licensed radio-series crimefighter star of Green Hornet Comics. On some Pines comics from 1947 to 1949, he signed covers as "Xela." Through the 1930s and 1940s, Schomburg produced over 500 comic book covers.

In the early 1950s, Schomburg left comics and spent the remainder of his career on covers and illustrations for science fiction magazines, astrology publications, and books, including the Winston juvenile series.

In 1962, Schomburg moved to a ranch house in Newberg, Oregon. His home was later purchased by the local university, George Fox University, and converted into student housing under the name "Schomburg House".

In 1977, Schomburg and a few of his fellow Golden Age comic book artists collaborated on the Invaders Annual #1, written by Roy Thomas. Schomburg penciled and inked a six-page chapter featuring the Golden Age Human Torch.

Late in life, Schomburg resided in Hillsboro, Oregon, and died in Beaverton, Oregon, on April 7, 1998.

== Awards ==
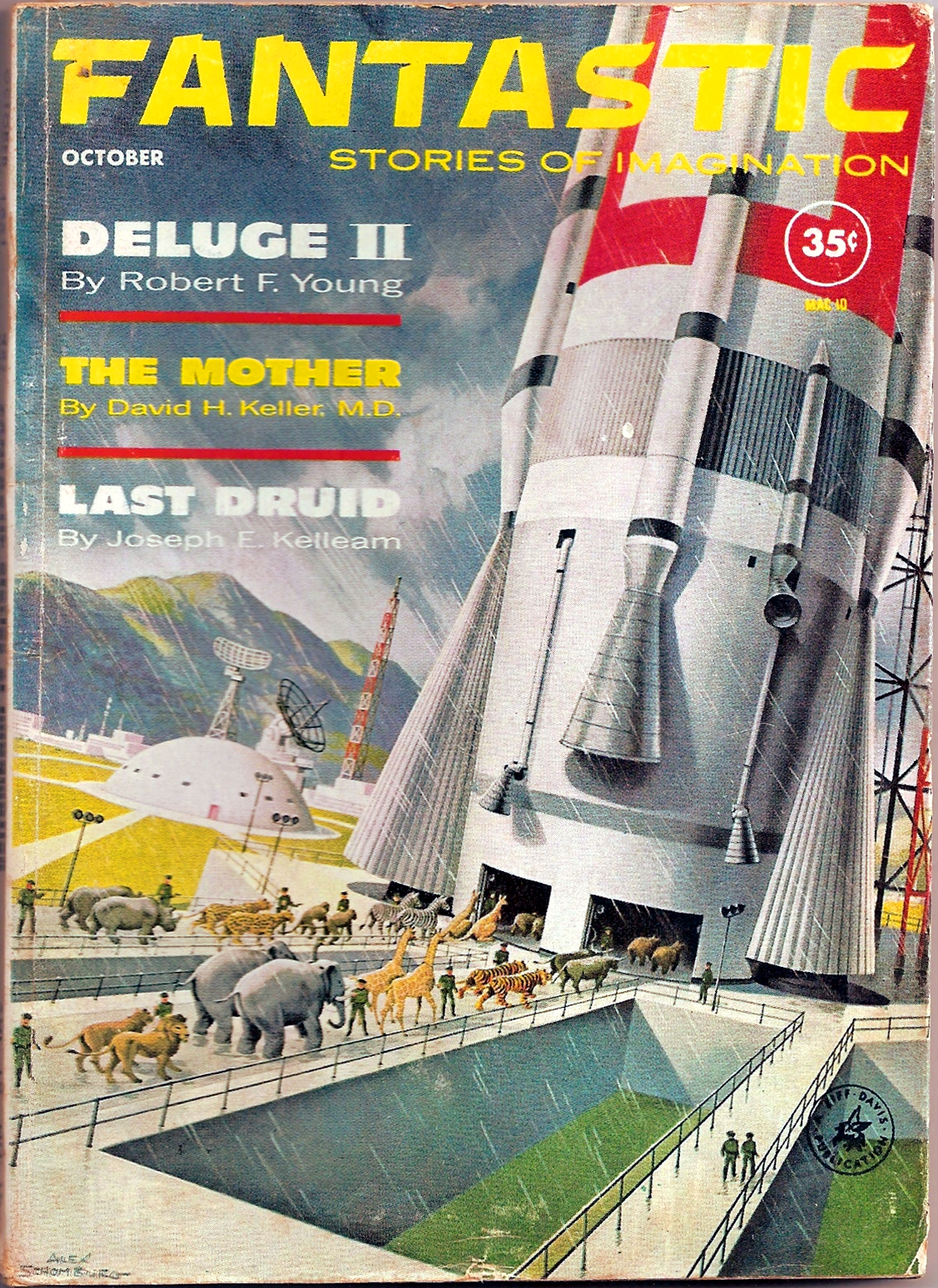
Fantastic (Oct. 1961). Cover art by Schomburg

- Nominated for Hugo Award for Best Professional Artist 1962; runner-up
- Doc Smith Second Stage Lensman Award September 30, 1979 Moscon 1
- Frank R. Paul Award 1984
- Inkpot Award 1985
- Kentucky colonel May 6, 1986
- Chesley Award (A.S.F.A. Award for Artistic Achievement) 1986
- Guest of Honor, PulpCon 16, July 9–12, 1987, Dayton, Ohio
- Lifetime Achievement Award, Kansas City Comic Con, Fall 1989
- First Fandom Hall of Fame award 1990
- 47th World Science Fiction Convention Noreascon III Special Committee Award (Lifetime Achievement Award), 1989, for contributions to Science Fiction
- The Will Eisner Award Hall of Fame 1999

== Critical assessments ==
Stan Lee wrote:

I've always felt that Alex Schomburg was to comic books what Norman Rockwell was to The Saturday Evening Post. He was totally unique, with an amazing distinctive style. You could never mistake a Schomburg cover for any other artist's. ... I remember hearing Timely Comics publisher Martin Goodman tell me time and again how great a cover illustrator Alex was, and how he wished we had more like him. ... [D]espite the quantity of work we gave him, despite the care and effort that went into every Schomburg cover, I cannot remember Alex ever being late with any illustration.

== See also ==
- List of Puerto Ricans
