= 1959 in science fiction =

The year 1959 was marked, in science fiction, by the following events.

== Births and deaths ==
=== Births ===
- Steve Alten
- Ayerdhal (d. 2015)
- Maurice Georges Dantec (d. 2016)
- Stephen Dedman
- Steven Erikson
- Andreas Eschbach
- Boban Knežević
- Maureen F. McHugh
- Lawrence M. Schoen
- Martha Soukup
- Neal Stephenson

=== Deaths ===
- Edwin Balmer (b. 1883)
- Otfrid von Hanstein (b. 1869)

== Literary releases ==
=== First editions ===
- Alas, Babylon by Pat Frank
- The Beast Master by Andre Norton
- A Canticle for Leibowitz by Walter M. Miller, Jr.
- The Canopy of Time by Brian Aldiss
- Dodkin's Job by Jack Vance
- Dorsai! by Gordon R. Dickson
- The Duplicated Man by James Blish and Robert Lowndes. (Note: First published in Dynamic Science Fiction in August 1953.)
- Echo in the Skull by John Brunner
- The Enemy Stars by Poul Anderson
- Immortality, Inc. by Robert Sheckley
- Level 7 by Mordecai Roshwald
- Next of Kin by Eric Frank Russell
- Ossian's Ride by Fred Hoyle
- The Outward Urge by John Wyndham
- The Sirens of Titan by Kurt Vonnegut
- Time Out of Joint by Philip K. Dick
- Voodoo Planet by Andre Norton
- The War Against the Rull by A. E. van Vogt
- Wolfbane by Frederik Pohl and C. M. Kornbluth
- The World Swappers by John Brunner

=== Short stories ===
- "Flowers for Algernon", by Daniel Keyes, originally published in the Magazine of Fantasy & Science Fiction

=== Juveniles ===
- Galactic Derelict by Andre Norton
- The Star Conquerors by Ben Bova
- Starship Troopers by Robert A. Heinlein

== Movies ==
Title	Director	Cast	Country	Subgenre/Notes
The 30 Foot Bride of Candy Rock	Sidney Miller	Lou Costello, Dorothy Provine, Gale Gordon	United States	Comedy
4D Man	Irvin Shortess Yeaworth Jr.	Robert Lansing, Lee Meriwether, James Congdon	United States	Action Horror Romance Thriller
The Angry Red Planet	Ib Melchior	Gerald Mohr, Les Tremayne, Nora Hayden	United States	Adventure Horror
The Atomic Submarine	Spencer Gordon Bennet	Arthur Franz, Dick Foran, Brett Halsey	United States	Thriller
Attack of the Giant Leeches	Bernard Kowalski	Jan Shepard, Gene Roth, Yvette Vickers	United States	Horror
Battle Beyond the Sun	Mikhail Kozyry	Aleksandr Shvorin, Ivan Pereverzhev	Soviet Union	Adventure
Battle in Outer Space (a.k.a. Uchû sai sensô)	Ishirō Honda	Ryō Ikebe, Koreya Senda	Japan	Action
Caltiki – The Immortal Monster (a.k.a. Caltiki, il mostro immortale)	Riccardo Freda, Mario Bava	John Merivale, Didi Perego, Gérard Herter, Giacomo Rossi-Stuart	Italy	Horror
The Cosmic Man	Herbert Greene	Bruce Bennett, John Carradine, Angela Greene	United States	Adventure Thriller
First Man into Space	Robert Day	Marshall Thompson, Marla Landi, Bill Edwards	United Kingdom	Drama Horror
The Giant Gila Monster	Ray Kellogg	Don Sullivan, Lisa Simone, Fred Graham	United States	Horror Thriller
Have Rocket, Will Travel	David Lowell Rich	Jerome Cowan, Anna-Lisa, Curly Joe DeRita	United States	Comedy Family
The Head (a.k.a. Die Nackte und der Satan)	Victor Trivas	Michel Simon, Horst Frank, Christiane Maybach	West Germany	Horror
The Incredible Petrified World	Jerry Warren	John Carradine, Phyllis Coates, Robert Clarke	United States	Action Adventure Thriller
Invisible Invaders	Edward L. Cahn	John Agar, Jean Byron, Philip Tonge, Robert Hutton, John Carradine	United States	Horror
Journey to the Center of the Earth	Henry Levin	Pat Boone, James Mason, Arlene Dahl, Diane Baker	United States	Adventure Family Fantasy Romance
The Killer Shrews	Ray Kellogg	James Best, Ken Curtis, Ingrid Goude	United States	Horror
The Manster	George Breakston, Kenneth G. Crane	Peter Dyneley, Jane Hylton, Satoshi Nakamura, Terri Zimmern	Japan; United States	Horror (released in U.S. in 1962)
The Man Who Could Cheat Death	Terence Fisher	Anton Diffring, Christopher Lee	United Kingdom	Drama Horror (Note: Remake of The Man in Half Moon Street.)
The Monster of Piedras Blancas	Irvin Berwick	Les Tremayne, Forrest Lewis, John Harmon	United States	Horror
Nebo Zovyot (a.k.a. Battle Beyond the Sun)	Mikhail Karyukov, Aleksandr Kozyr	Ivan Pereverzev	Soviet Union	Adventure
On the Beach	Stanley Kramer	Gregory Peck, Ava Gardner, Fred Astaire	United States	Drama Romance
Plan 9 from Outer Space	Edward D. Wood Jr.	Bela Lugosi, Mona McKinnon, Gregory Walcott, Vampira	United States	Horror
Return of the Fly	Edward Bernds	Vincent Price, Brett Halsey, John Sutton	United States	Drama Fantasy Horror
Invasion of the Animal People (a.k.a. Terror in the Midnight Sun)	Virgil W. Vogel	Bengt Blomgren, John Carradine	United States; Sweden	Horror
Teenagers from Outer Space	Tom Graeff	David Love, Dawn Anderson, Harvey B. Dunn	United States	Horror Thriller
The Tingler	William Castle	Vincent Price, Judith Evelyn, Darryl Hickman	United States	Horror
The Giant Behemoth (a.k.a. Behemoth, the Sea Monster or The Behemoth)	Eugène Lourié, Douglas Hickox	Gene Evans, André Morell	United States	Horror
The Ugly Duckling	Lance Comfort	Bernard Bresslaw, Jon Pertwee, Reginald Beckwith	United Kingdom	Comedy
The Wasp Woman	Roger Corman	Susan Cabot, Anthony Eisley, Barboura Morris, Michael Mark, Bruno Ve Sota	United States	Horror
The World, the Flesh and the Devil	Ranald MacDougall	Harry Belafonte, Inger Stevens, Mel Ferrer	United States	Drama Romance

== Awards ==
- A Case of Conscience by James Blish won the Hugo Award for Best Novel.

== See also ==
- 1959 in science
