= 1951 in science fiction =

The year 1951 was marked, in science fiction, by the following events.

== Births and deaths ==
=== Births ===
- A. A. Attanasio
- Michael A. Banks
- Greg Bear (d. 2022)
- David Bischoff (d. 2018)
- Orson Scott Card
- Christopher Evans
- Esther Friesner
- Barbara Hambly
- Simon Hawke
- Christopher Hinz
- P. C. Hodgell
- Theodore Judson
- James Patrick Kelly
- David Marusek
- Lisanne Norman
- Melinda Snodgrass
- John Steakley (d. 2010)
- K. D. Wentworth (d. 2012)
- Timothy Zahn

== Literary releases ==
=== Serialized novels ===
- The Continent Makers by L. Sprague de Camp. It first appeared in book form in the collection The Continent Makers and Other Tales of the Viagens, published in hardcover by Twayne Publishers in 1953.
- Planets in Combat by Robert A. Heinlein, Blue Book (September–October), first publication of Between Planets, also published in hardcover in October.

=== First editions ===
- The Astronauts by Stanisław Lem (in Polish), explores the challenges and philosophical implications of space exploration.
- The Day of the Triffids by John Wyndham, depicts a post-apocalyptic world where humanity faces deadly plants and societal collapse.
- Foundation by Isaac Asimov, chronicles the rise and fall of a galactic empire through the fictional science of psychohistory.
- Prelude to Space by Arthur C. Clarke, focuses on humanity's first steps towards space exploration and colonization.
- The Puppet Masters by Robert A. Heinlein, humanity battles against alien parasites that can control human minds.
- Rogue Queen by L. Sprague de Camp, explores a human-alien romance and the clash of cultures on an alien world.
- The Sands of Mars by Arthur C. Clarke, envisions the challenges and discoveries of the first human colony on Mars.
- The Stars, Like Dust by Isaac Asimov, follows a young man caught in political intrigue and rebellion across star systems.
- Time and Again by Clifford D. Simak, explores time travel and its effects on humanity and the natural world.
- The Weapon Shops of Isher by A. E. van Vogt, portrays a future society where citizens have access to advanced weaponry to defend against tyranny.

=== Novellas ===
- And Then There Were None by Eric Frank Russell, Astounding Science Fiction (June), anarchy in action—an Earth envoy encounters an alien society that rejects authority and government.

=== Short stories ===
- "The Fireman" by Ray Bradbury, Galaxy Science Fiction (February), later expanded into Fahrenheit 451 (1953)
- "Sentinel of Eternity" by Arthur C. Clarke, 10 Story Fantasy (Spring), renamed "The Sentinel" in subsequent collections.

=== Short story collections ===
- The Green Hills of Earth by Robert A. Heinlein (collection)
- The Illustrated Man by Ray Bradbury (collection)

=== Juveniles ===
- Between Planets by Robert A. Heinlein (juvenile), follows a young man navigating between Earth and the colonies of Venus and Mars.

== Movies ==
| Title | Director | Cast | Country | Subgenre/Notes |
|---|---|---|---|---|
| Abbott and Costello Meet the Invisible Man | Charles Lamont | Bud Abbott, Lou Costello, Nancy Guild | United States | Comedy Family Sport |
| Captain Video: Master of the Stratosphere | Spencer Gordon Bennet, Wallace Grissell | Judd Holdren, Gene Roth | United States | Adventure Serial film |
| The Day the Earth Stood Still | Robert Wise | Michael Rennie, Patricia Neal, Hugh Marlowe, Sam Jaffe | United States | Drama (Note: Winner of a Golden Globe Award for Best Film Promoting International Understanding in 1951.) |
| Five | Arch Oboler | William Phipps, Susan Douglas, James Anderson | United States | Drama Horror |
| Flight to Mars | Lesley Selander | Marguerite Chapman, Cameron Mitchell, Arthur Franz | United States | Drama |
| I'll Never Forget You | Roy Ward Baker | Tyrone Power, Ann Blyth | United States | |
| Lost Continent | Sam Newfield | Cesar Romero, Hillary Brooke, Chick Chandler | United States | Adventure Fantasy |
| Lost Planet Airmen | Fred C. Brannon | Tristram Coffin, Mae Clarke, I. Stanford Jolley | United States | Action Crime (Note: Assembled from the serial King of the Rocket Men.) |
| The Man from Planet X | Edgar G. Ulmer | Robert Clarke, Margaret Field, Raymond Bond | United States | Horror Romance Thriller |
| The Man in the White Suit | Alexander Mackendrick | Alec Guinness, Joan Greenwood, Cecil Parker, Michael Gough, Ernest Thesiger | United Kingdom | Comedy Drama |
| Mysterious Island | Spencer Gordon Bennet | Richard Crane, Marshall Reed, Karen Randle, Ralph Hodges | United States | Action Family Serial film |
| Superman and the Mole Men | Lee Sholem | George Reeves, Phyllis Coates, Jeff Corey | United States | Action Adventure Drama Family Fantasy Romance |
| The Thing from Another World | Christian Nyby | Margaret Sheridan, Kenneth Tobey, Robert Cornthwaite | United States | Horror |
| Two Lost Worlds | Norman Dawn, Norman Kennedy | James Arness, Laura Elliott | United States | Adventure Romance |
| Unknown World | Terrell O. Morse | Bruce Kellogg, Marilyn Nash, Jim Bannon, Otto Waldis | United States | Adventure |
| When Worlds Collide | Rudolph Maté | Richard Derr, Barbara Rush, Peter Hansen, John Hoyt | United States | Action Thriller |

== Awards ==
The main science-fiction awards known at the present time did not exist at this time.

== See also ==
- 1951 in science
