= 1953 in science fiction =

The year 1953 was marked, in science fiction, by the following events.

== Births and deaths ==
=== Births ===
- Pat Cadigan
- Brad Ferguson
- Lisa Goldstein
- Jon Courtenay Grimwood
- Annette Curtis Klause
- David Langford
- Ged Maybury
- Alan Moore
- Charles Pellegrino
- Tony Rothman
- J. Neil Schulman (d. 2019)
- John Shirley
- S. M. Stirling
- Walter Jon Williams
- Robert Charles Wilson

== Events ==
The first Hugo Awards were presented at the 11th Worldcon in Philadelphia in 1953, which awarded Hugos in seven categories. The awards presented that year were initially conceived as a one-off event, though the organizers hoped that subsequent conventions would also present them. At the time, Worldcons were completely run by their respective committees as independent events and had no oversight between years. Thus there was no mandate for any future conventions to repeat the awards, and no set rules for how to do so.

The 1954 Worldcon chose not to, but the awards were reinstated at the 1955 Worldcon, and thereafter became traditional. The award was called the Annual Science Fiction Achievement Award, with "Hugo Award" being an unofficial, but better known name. The nickname was accepted as an official alternative name in 1958, and since the 1992 awards the nickname has been adopted as the official name of the award.

== Literary releases ==
=== Serialized novels ===
- The Duplicated Man by James Blish and Robert Lowndes, Dynamic Science Fiction (August), published in book form in 1959.
- Mission of Gravity by Hal Clement, Astounding Science Fiction (April–July), published in hardcover in 1954.
- The Virgin of Zesh by L. Sprague de Camp, Thrilling Wonder Stories (February), later becoming the fourth book of his Viagens Interplanetarias series.

=== First editions ===
- The Abyss of Wonders by Perley Poore Sheehan, follows a diverse group on a spiritual quest to a technologically advanced, lost city in the Gobi Desert.
- Against the Fall of Night by Arthur C. Clarke, explores a future Earth where humans are confined to one city. (Note: An expanded version of a novella which originally appeared in the November 1948 issue of Startling Stories.)
- Atta: A Novel of a Most Extraordinary Adventure by Francis Rufus Bellamy, a Robinson Crusoe-like tale of a man who is hit by lightning and wakes up to find himself half an inch tall.
- Bring the Jubilee by Ward Moore, an alternate history where the South won the Civil War.
- Childhood's End by Arthur C. Clarke, a novel about a peaceful alien invasion of Earth.
- The Demolished Man by Alfred Bester, set in a future where telepathy is common, focusing on a murder mystery.
- Fahrenheit 451 by Ray Bradbury, a dystopian novel about a society where books are banned. (Note: Expanded from "The Firemen", a short story published in the February 1951 issue of Galaxy Science Fiction.)
- Iceworld by Hal Clement, follows an alien narcotics agent on Earth, where he teams up with humans to stop the smuggling of tobacco to Sirius.
- The Kraken Wakes by John Wyndham (published in the US as Out of the Deeps), a novel about Earth's response to underwater aliens.
- Man of Many Minds by E. Everett Evans, the adventures of George Hanlon, a secret service agent who has the ability to read minds.
- More Than Human by Theodore Sturgeon, a novel about individuals with psychic powers forming a new society.
- The Paradox Men by Charles L. Harness, a dystopian future where rebels use time travel to fight tyranny. (Note: Initially published as a novella, "Flight into Yesterday", in the May 1949 issue of Startling Stories.)
- Ring Around the Sun by Clifford D. Simak, explores the discovery of parallel universes and the implications for identity and existence.
- Second Foundation by Isaac Asimov, third book in the Foundation series, a Second Foundation guides the fate of humanity amidst a crumbling Galactic Empire.
- Space Lawyer by Nat Schachner, a fix-up from two short stories, "Old Fireball" and "Jurisdiction", both of which had originally appeared in Astounding.
- The Space Merchants by Frederik Pohl and C. M. Kornbluth, a satirical novel about a future dominated by corporate interests and advertising.
- Star Rangers by Andre Norton, a novel about interstellar exploration and the struggle for survival in a distant, hostile galaxy.
- The Syndic by Cyril M. Kornbluth, in a future North America ruled by rival gangs, a man infiltrates an exiled government to uncover assassination plot secrets.
- The Undying Fire by Fletcher Pratt, an interstellar expedition to steal a neptunium motor, punctuated by various political and romantic complications. (Note: Originally published as a novella, The Conditioned Captain, in the May 1953 issue of Startling Stories (The Conditioned Captain title listing at the Internet Speculative Fiction Database).)
- The Universe Maker by A. E. van Vogt, a man is drawn into a complex future society and discovers his pivotal role in its destiny. (Note: Based on the short story "The Shadow Men", Startling Stories (1950).)

=== Novellas ===
- The Conditioned Captain by Fletcher Pratt, also published in book form as The Undying Fire (see above).

=== Short stories ===
- "The Defenders" by Philip K. Dick, Galaxy Science Fiction (January).
- "The Imposter" by Philip K. Dick,
- "The Escape" by Poul Anderson, Space Science Fiction (September–November). (Note: Expanded and published in paperback as Brain Wave in 1954.)
- "It's a Good Life" by Jerome Bixby, appeared in the anthology Star Science Fiction Stories No.2.
- "The Nine Billion Names of God" by Arthur C. Clarke, appeared in the anthology Star Science Fiction Stories No.1.

=== Short story collections ===
- The Continent Makers and Other Tales of the Viagens by L. Sprague de Camp, the fifth book in his Viagens Interplanetarias series.
- Star Science Fiction Stories No.1 edited by Frederik Pohl, Ballantine Books.
- Star Science Fiction Stories No.2 edited by Frederik Pohl, Ballantine Books.

=== Juveniles ===
- Attack from Atlantis by Lester del Rey (juvenile), a scientific expedition encounters conflict with the inhabitants of an underwater city of Atlantis.
- The Lost Planet by Angus MacVicar (juvenile), a teenager joins his uncle's team to explore a near-Earth planet, Hesikos, facing sabotage and a crash landing before being rescued.
- Missing Men of Saturn by Robert S. Richardson (juvenile), a recent Space Academy graduate joins the decrepit Albatross to explore Saturn, where mysterious disappearances fuel crew fears.
- Planet of Light by Raymond F. Jones (juvenile), a sequel to Son of the Stars (1952), the Barron family are taken to a planet in the Andromeda Galaxy to participate an intergalactic United Nations.
- Rocket to Luna by Richard Marsten (juvenile), a Space Academy student confronts an injured graduate on a space station, leading to a confrontation that results in the student joining a Moon expedition.
- Space Platform by Murray Leinster (juvenile), the first novel in the Joe Kenmore series, America builds a Space Platform amid sabotage to secure military supremacy and prevent atomic war.
- Space Tug by Murray Leinster (juvenile), the second novel in the Joe Kenmore series, concerns the problems of the running of a space station.
- Starman Jones by Robert A. Heinlein (juvenile), a young man dreams of space travel and overcomes obstacles to become an astrogator.
- Vandals of the Void by Jack Vance (juvenile), a young cadet confronts space pirates threatening the interplanetary order.

== Movies ==
Title	Director	Cast	Country	Subgenre/Notes
Abbott and Costello Go to Mars	Charles Lamont	Bud Abbott, Lou Costello, Mari Blanchard	United States	Comedy, family, fantasy
Abbott and Costello Meet Dr. Jekyll and Mr. Hyde	Charles Lamont	Bud Abbott, Lou Costello, Boris Karloff	United States	Comedy, horror, mystery
The Beast from 20,000 Fathoms	Eugène Lourié	Paul Christian, Paula Raymond, Cecil Kellaway	United States	Horror
Cat-Women of the Moon	Arthur D. Hilton	Sonny Tufts, Victor Jory, Marie Windsor, Carol Brewster	United States	Adventure (Note: Alternative title: Rocket to the Moon.)
Commando Cody: Sky Marshal of the Universe	Harry Keller, Franklin Adreon, Fred C. Brannon	Judd Holdren, Aline Towne	United States	Action-adventure serial film
Donovan's Brain	Felix E. Feist	Lew Ayres, Gene Evans, Nancy Davis	United States	Horror
Flight to the Moon (a.k.a. Полёт на Луну)	Brumberg sisters	Vera Bendina (voice), Yevgeniya Mores (voice), Valentina Sperantova (voice)	Soviet Union	Animation, short, adventure, family
Four Sided Triangle	Terence Fisher	Barbara Payton, John Van Eyssen, Percy Marmont	United Kingdom	Romance
Invaders from Mars	William Cameron Menzies	Jimmy Hunt, Arthur Franz, Helena Carter	United States	Horror
It Came from Outer Space	Jack Arnold	Richard Carlson, Barbara Rush, Charles Drake	United States	Horror
The Lost Planet	Spencer Gordon Bennet	Judd Holdren, Vivian Mason, Michael Fox	United States	Family serial film
The Magnetic Monster	Curt Siodmak	Richard Carlson, King Donovan, Harry Ellerbe	United States	Horror
Mesa of Lost Women	Herbert Tevos, Ron Ormond	Jackie Coogan, Richard Travis, Allan Nixon, Mary Hill	United States	Horror
The Neanderthal Man	Ewald Andre Dupont	Robert Shayne, Doris Merrick, Richard Crane	United States	Horror
Phantom from Space	W. Lee Wilder	Ted Cooper, Rudolph Anders, Noreen Nash	United States	Horror
Port Sinister a.k.a. Beast of Paradise Isle (UK)	Harold Daniels	James Warren, Lynne Roberts, Paul Cavanagh	United States	Adventure Crime (Note: 1957 reissue title: Beast of Paradise Isle.)
Project Moonbase	Richard Talmadge	Donna Martell, Hayden Rorke, Ross Ford	United States	
Robot Monster	Phil Tucker	George Nader, Claudia Barrett, Selena Royle	United States	Comedy, family, horror (Note: U.S. 2-D version title: Monster from Mars.)
Spaceways	Terence Fisher	Howard Duff, Eva Bartok, Alan Wheatley	United Kingdom; United States	Thriller
The Twonky	Arch Oboler	Hans Conried, Billy Lynn, Gloria Blondell, Janet Warren	United States	Comedy
The War of the Worlds	Byron Haskin	Gene Barry, Ann Robinson, Les Tremayne, Lewis Martin	United States	Action thriller (Note: Winner of an Academy Award for Visual Effects in 1953, and a Retroactive Hugo Award in 2004.)

== Awards ==
- The Demolished Man by Alfred Bester won the Hugo Award for Best Novel.

== See also ==
- 1953 in science
