= Roshwald =

Roshwald is a surname. Notable people with the surname include:

- Aviel Roshwald, American historian and academic
- Mordecai Roshwald (1921–2015), American-Israeli academic and writer
