= Otto Waldis =

Austrian-American actor (1901–1974)

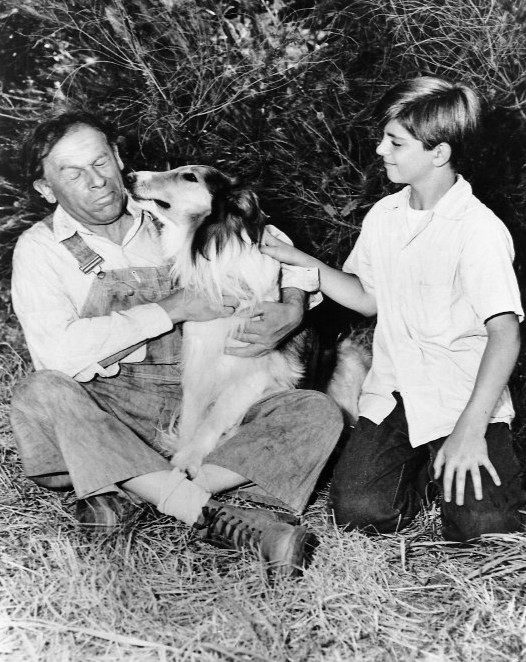
- Waldis, Lassie, and Tommy Rettig in 1956
- Born: May 20, 1901; Vienna, Austria-Hungary
- Died: March 25, 1974 (aged 72); Hollywood, Los Angeles, California, U.S.
- Other names: Otto Blum; Otto Wernicke
- Occupation: Actor
- Spouse: Margaret Vieth (1935 – ?)

Otto Waldis (born Otto Glucksmann-Blum, May 20, 1901 – March 25, 1974) was an Austrian-American character actor in films and television from the 1930s through the 1960s. He was also billed as Otto Blum.

== Years in Germany ==
Waldis was born Otto Glucksmann-Blum in 1901 in Vienna. He was a student during World War I and initially studied to be a naval engineer. When Germany had no navy after the war, he shifted his attention to acting in the 1920s. Rudolph Schildkraut saw him perform and encouraged him to pursue a theatrical career. Billed as Otto Valdis, he performed Shakespeare and classic German plays. He also directed plays.

Waldis began made his film debut in a small role in director Fritz Lang's classic thriller M (1931) starring Peter Lorre. After he began acting regularly in films, he had the lead in The Broken Pitcher, which received first prize in an international competition in 1934.

== Emigration and work in Hollywood ==
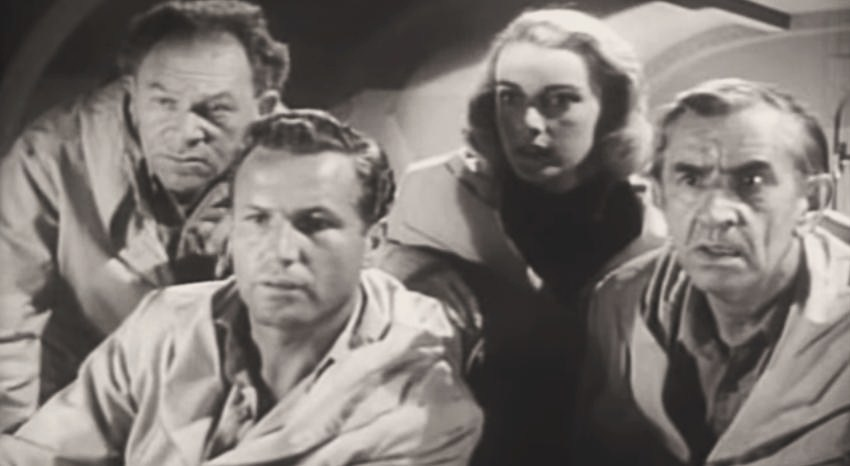
From Unknown World (1951), L-R: Otto Waldis, Bruce Kellogg, Marilyn Nash and Victor Kilian.

The Jewish actor fled from Europe because of the persecution from the Nazi Regime. He and his wife left Austria and arrived in Birmingham, Alabama, in June 1940. He worked as a photographer in Birmingham.

Waldis became a familiar character actor often appearing in B movies and his roles were sometimes uncredited. He also appeared regularly on television during the 1950s and '60s. Waldis also occasionally acted on stage.

== Personal life and death ==
Waldis married Margaret Vieth, an opera singer, in 1935. He died of a heart attack in 1974 at the age of 72.

== Selected filmography ==
- M (1931) – (uncredited)
- Kinder vor Gericht (1931) – Ein Gefangener
- Die Koffer des Herrn O.F. (1931)
- The Exile (1947) – Jan
- Call Northside 777 (1948) – Boris Siskovich (uncredited)
- Letter from an Unknown Woman (1948) – Concierge
- Berlin Express (1948) – Kessler
- A Foreign Affair (1948) – Inspector (uncredited)
- The Fighting O'Flynn (1949) – General van Dronk
- The Lovable Cheat (1949) – Bailiff
- I Was a Male War Bride (1949) – Minor Role (scenes deleted)
- Love Happy (1949) – Ivan – Assassin in Grunion's Office (uncredited)
- Border Incident (1949) – Fritz
- Bagdad (1949) – Marengo
- Women from Headquarters (1950) – Joe Calla
- Spy Hunt (1950) – Gormand
- Dark City (1950) – Benowski (uncredited)
- Bird of Paradise (1951) – Skipper
- Night Into Morning (1951) – Dr. Franz Niemoller
- Secrets of Monte Carlo (1951) – Louis Gunther
- The Whip Hand (1951) – Dr. Wilhelm Bucholtz
- Unknown World (1951) – Dr. Max A. Bauer
- 5 Fingers (1952) – Pullman Porter (uncredited)
- Anything Can Happen (1952) – Sandro
- The Black Castle (1952) – Krantz, the Innkeeper
- The Congregation (1952)
- Rogue's March (1953) – Alex
- The Stars Are Singing (1953) – Ship's Captain Goslak
- Rebel City (1953) – Spain, the Jeweler
- The Robe (1953) – Slave Dealer (uncredited)
- Flight to Tangier (1953) – Wisil (uncredited)
- Prince Valiant (1954) – Patch-Eye (uncredited)
- Knock on Wood (1954) – Brodnik
- The Iron Glove (1954) – King George I (uncredited)
- Port of Hell (1954) – Snyder
- Sincerely Yours (1955) – Professor Zwolinski (uncredited)
- Artists and Models (1955) – Kurt
- Running Wild (1955) – Leta's Father
- Desert Sands (1955) – Gabin
- Man from Del Rio (1956) – Tom Jordan (uncredited)
- Ride the High Iron (1956) – Yanusz Danielchik
- The Night the World Exploded (1957) – Professor Hagstrom (uncredited)
- Alfred Hitchcock Presents (1958) (Season 3 Episode 28: "Lamb to the Slaughter") - Sam
- Alfred Hitchcock Presents (1958) (Season 3 Episode 39: "Little White Frock") - Mr. Koslow
- Attack of the 50 Foot Woman (1958) – Dr. Heinrich Von Loeb
- The Blue Angel (1959) – Policeman (uncredited)
- Pier 5, Havana (1959) – Schluss
- Judgment at Nuremberg (1961) – Pohl
- The Phantom of Soho (1964) – Wilhelm Grover, man with birthmark
- Freddy in the Wild West (1964) – Old Joe
- Move (1970) – (uncredited) (final film role)

Waldis also made several guest appearances on television including roles in My Little Margie, The Adventures of Superman, General Electric Theater, Lassie, Maverick, Alfred Hitchcock Presents, Perry Mason, Peter Gunn, Playhouse 90, Have Gun - Will Travel, The Untouchables, 77 Sunset Strip, Wagon Train, Lawman, Ben Casey, Hogan's Heroes, Mannix and Gomer Pyle, USMC.
