= CWV =

CWV may refer to:

- Catholic War Veterans, an American organization
- Cloudy Wing Virus, a disease of the honey bee
- Core Web Vitals, Google signals that are essential to delivering a better user experience on the web, the Core Web Vitals are the technical factors impact SEO.
