= The Undying Fire =

The Undying Fire may refer to:

- The Undying Fire (Pratt novel), a 1953 science fiction novel by Fletcher Pratt
- The Undying Fire (Wells novel), a 1919 novel by H. G. Wells
