= Monsieur Verdoux =

1947 film by Charlie Chaplin

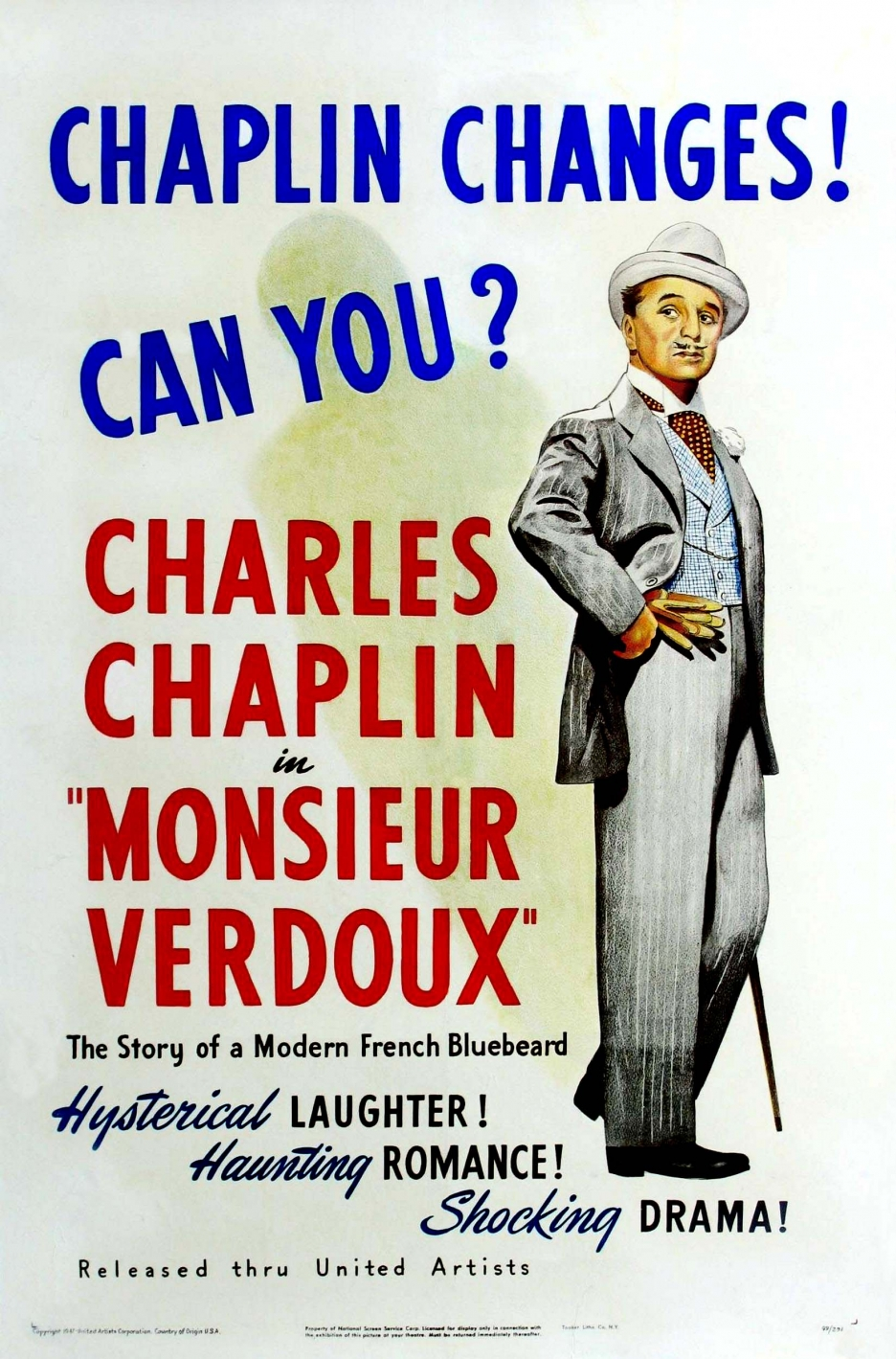
- Theatrical release poster (1947)
- Directed by: Charlie Chaplin
- Screenplay by: Charlie Chaplin
- Story by: Orson Welles
- Produced by: Charlie Chaplin
- Starring: Charlie Chaplin; Martha Raye; William Frawley; Marilyn Nash; Isobel Elsom
- Cinematography: Roland Totheroh; Curt Courant (uncredited)
- Edited by: Willard Nico
- Music by: Charlie Chaplin
- Distributed by: United Artists
- Release date: April 11, 1947
- Running time: 124 minutes
- Country: United States
- Language: English
- Box office: $323,000 (US) $1.5 million (international)

Monsieur Verdoux is a 1947 American black comedy film directed by and starring Charlie Chaplin, who plays a bigamist wife killer inspired by serial killer Henri Désiré Landru. The supporting cast includes Martha Raye, William Frawley, and Marilyn Nash.

The film concerns a former bank teller who marries and murders wealthy women in order to support his wife and child. It was controversial upon its release for its dark tone and critique of war and capitalism, and was consequently a critical and box office failure. Because the film was released around the same time that Chaplin was facing accusations of being a Communist, it was boycotted by several civic groups and damaged Chaplin's career.

== Plot ==
Henri Verdoux had been a bank teller for 30 years before being laid off. To support his disabled wife and his child, he begins marrying and murdering wealthy widows. The Couvais family becomes suspicious when Thelma Couvais withdraws all her money and disappears two weeks after marrying a man named "Varnay", whom they only know through a photograph.

Verdoux tries to woo Marie Grosnay, but she refuses. Over the following weeks, Verdoux has a flower girl repeatedly send Grosnay flowers. In urgent need of money to invest, Verdoux, now posing as M. Floray, visits Lydia Floray, one of his previous victims and convinces her the financial crisis is imminent so she takes her savings out of the bank. The following night, Verdoux murders her and takes the money.

At a dinner party with his real wife, Verdoux asks a friend of theirs, a chemist, about the drug he developed to exterminate animals painlessly. The chemist explains the formula and that he had to stop working on it after the local pharmaceutical board banned it, so Verdoux attempts to recreate the drug.

Shortly thereafter, Verdoux finds a girl taking shelter from the rain in a doorway and takes her in. When he finds she was just released from prison and has nowhere to go, he prepares dinner for her with wine laced with his newly developed poison. Before drinking the wine, she thanks him for his kindness, and starts to talk about her crippled husband who died while she was in jail. Verdoux decides to spare her and replaces her drugged drink with a glass of unpoisoned wine.

Verdoux makes several attempts to murder Annabella Bonheur, who believes Verdoux to be Bonheur, a sea captain who is frequently away, but she repeatedly escapes death while, at the same time, putting Verdoux himself in danger. Meanwhile, Grosnay relents from the continual flowers from Verdoux and invites Verdoux to her residence. He convinces her to marry him, and Grosnay's friends hold a large public wedding. Unexpectedly, Annabella Bonheur shows up to the wedding. Panicking, Verdoux fakes a cramp to avoid being seen and eventually deserts the wedding.

In the years leading up to the Second World War, European markets collapse, with the subsequent bank failures causing Verdoux to go bankrupt. The economic crisis leads to rise of fascism across Europe. A few years later, in 1937, with the Spanish Civil War underway, the girl, now well-dressed and chic, once again finds Verdoux on a street corner in Paris. She invites him to an elegant dinner at a high-end restaurant as a gesture of gratitude for his earlier kindness. The girl has married a wealthy munitions executive she does not love to be well-off. Verdoux reveals that he has lost his family. At the restaurant, members of the Couvais family recognize Verdoux and attempt a pursuit. Verdoux delays them long enough to bid the girl farewell before surrendering to his pursuers.

Verdoux is convicted of murder. When he is sentenced in the courtroom, rather than expressing remorse he takes the opportunity to say that the world encourages mass murder, and that compared to the makers of modern weapons he is but an amateur. As Verdoux waits to be taken to the guillotine, a journalist interviews him. Verdoux remarks that leaders who wage wars that kill millions are lauded as heroes, while he, who killed "only a few" people, is considered a villain. When guards come to take him to the guillotine he is offered a cigarette, which he refuses, and also a glass of rum, which he accepts. The priest begins reciting a prayer in Latin as the guards lead him away.

== Cast ==
- Charlie Chaplin as Monsieur Henri Verdoux / Monsieur Varnay / Monsieur Bonheur / Monsieur Floray
- Mady Correll as Mona Verdoux (legal wife of Verdoux)
- Allison Roddan as Peter Verdoux, their son
- Robert Lewis as Maurice Bottello, Verdoux's friend
- Audrey Betz as Martha Bottello
- Martha Raye as Annabella Bonheur, who believes Verdoux to be Bonheur, a sea captain who is frequently away
- Ada-May as Annette, Annabella's maid
- Isobel Elsom as Marie Grosnay, an aged widow interested in purchasing Thelma's residence and whom Verdoux (as Varnay) attempts to court
- Marjorie Bennett as Marie's maid
- Helene Heigh as Yvonne, Marie's friend
- Margaret Hoffman as Lydia Floray, who believes Verdoux to be Floray, an engineer who had been away from home for months
- Marilyn Nash as The Girl, a young woman whom Verdoux meets and attempts to poison before her views on society change his mind
- Irving Bacon as Pierre Couvais
- Edwin Mills as Jean Couvais
- Virginia Brissac as Carlotta Couvais
- Almira Sessions as Lena Couvais
- Eula Morgan as Phoebe Couvais
- Bernard J. Nedell as The Prefect Of Police
- Charles Evans as Detective Morrow
- Lois Conklin as Florist
- Christine Ell as Louise
- William Frawley as Jean La Salle
- John Harmon as Joe Darwin
- Arthur Hohl as Real Estate Agent
- Fritz Leiber as Father Fareaux
- Vera Marshe as Mrs. Vicki Darwin
- Barbara Slater as The Flower Seller
- Joseph Crehan as Broker
- Cyril Delevanti as Postman
- Frank Reicher as Doctor
- Paul Newlan as Garden Party Guest
- C. Montague Shaw as Mortgage Banker
- Addison Richards as Bank Manager
- Pierre Watkin as Prison Official

== Production ==
Fellow American actor-writer-director Orson Welles received a 'Based on an idea by' credit in the film. Chaplin and Welles disagreed on the exact circumstances that led to the film's production, although both men agreed that Welles initially approached Chaplin with the idea of having Chaplin star in a film as either a character based on Henri Landru or Landru himself. However, from there, both men's stories diverge considerably.

Welles claimed that he was developing a film of his own and was inspired to cast Chaplin as a character based on Landru. Chaplin initially agreed, but he later backed out at the last minute, not wanting to act for another director. Chaplin later offered to buy the script from him, and as Welles was in desperate need of money, he signed away all rights to Chaplin. According to Welles, Chaplin then rewrote several major sections, including the ending; the only specific scene to which Welles laid claim was the opening. Welles acknowledged that Chaplin claimed to have no memory of receiving a script from Welles, and believed Chaplin was telling the truth when he said this.

Chaplin claimed that Welles came to his house with the idea of doing a "series of documentaries, one to be on the celebrated French murderer, Bluebeard Landru", which he thought would be a wonderful dramatic part for Chaplin. Chaplin was initially interested, as it would provide him with an opportunity for a more dramatic role, as well as saving him the trouble of having to write the film himself. However, Chaplin claimed that Welles then explained that the script had not yet been written and he wanted Chaplin's help to do so. As a result, Chaplin dropped out of Welles's project. Very shortly thereafter, the idea struck Chaplin that Landru's story would make a good comedy. Chaplin then telephoned Welles and told him that, while his new idea had nothing to do with Welles's proposed documentary or with Landru, he was willing to pay Welles $5,000 in order to "clear everything". After negotiations, Welles accepted on the terms that he would receive a "story by" screen credit. Chaplin later stated that he would have insisted on no screen credit at all had he known that Welles would eventually try to take credit for the idea.

== Reception ==
=== Critical response ===
This was the first feature film in which Chaplin's character bore no resemblance to his famous "Tramp" character (The Great Dictator did not feature the Tramp, but his "Jewish barber" bore some similarity). While immediately after the end of World War II there appeared on both sides of the Atlantic Ocean a spate of films, including in 1946 The Best Years of Our Lives, It's a Wonderful Life and A Matter of Life and Death, which drew on so many people's experience of loss of loved ones and offered a kind of consolation, Monsieur Verdoux had an unapologetically dark tone, featuring as its protagonist a murderer who feels justified in committing his crimes. Consequently, it was poorly received in America when it premiered there. Moreover, Chaplin's popularity and public image had been irrevocably damaged by many scandals and political controversies before its release.

The film had its world premiere at the Broadway Theatre in New York City on April 11, 1947.

Chaplin was subjected to unusually hostile treatment by the press while promoting the opening of the film, and some boycotts took place during its short run. Bosley Crowther of The New York Times said the film was "tediously slow" in many stretches but said that Chaplin's "performance is remarkably adroit and that those who assist him, especially Miss Raye, are completely up to snuff." In New Jersey, the film was picketed by members of the Catholic War Veterans, who carried placards calling for Chaplin to be deported. In Denver, similar protests against the film by the American Legion managed to prevent it being shown. A censorship board in Memphis, Tennessee, banned Monsieur Verdoux outright. At one press conference to promote the film, Chaplin invited questions from the press with the words "Proceed with the butchering". Richard Coe in The Washington Post lauded Monsieur Verdoux, calling it "a bold, brilliant and bitterly amusing film". James Agee praised the film as well, calling it "a great poem" and "one of the few indispensable works of our time". Agee continued: "It is not the finest picture Chaplin ever made, but it is certainly the most fascinating." Evelyn Waugh praised Monsieur Verdoux as "a startling and mature work of art", although Waugh also added that he thought "there is a 'message' and I think, a deplorable one" in the film.

The film was popular in France, where it had admissions of 2,605,679. In 1948, a Parisian named Verdoux and employed in a bank brought an unsuccessful suit against Chaplin, alleging that his coworkers had mocked him for his name during the period of the film's advertisement.

==== Modern appraisal ====
On review aggregator Rotten Tomatoes, the film holds a 97% approval rating based on 37 critic reviews. The consensus for the film reads, "Charles Chaplin adds an undercurrent of malice to his comedic persona in Monsieur Verdoux, an unsettling satire that subverts the tramp's image to perversely amusing effect."

In the decades since its release, Monsieur Verdoux has become more highly regarded. The Village Voice ranked Monsieur Verdoux at No. 112 in its Top 250 "Best Films of the Century" list in 1999, based on a poll of critics. The film was voted at No. 63 on the list of "100 Greatest Films" by the French magazine Cahiers du cinéma in 2008.

== Accolades ==
Award/association	Year	Category	Recipient(s) and nominee(s)	Result	Ref.
Academy Awards	1948	Best Original Screenplay	Charlie Chaplin	Nominated	
Blue Ribbon Awards	1948	Best Foreign Film	Monsieur Verdoux	Won	
Bodil Awards	1948	Best American Film	Monsieur Verdoux	Won	
National Board of Review	1947	Best Film	Monsieur Verdoux	Won	

== Cited sources ==
- Agee, James (2005). Film Writing and Selected Journalism. New York City: Library of America. ISBN 9781931082822.
- Balio, Tina (2009) [1987]. United Artists: The Company That Changed the Film Industry. Madison, Wisconsin: University of Wisconsin Press. ISBN 978-0-299-23004-3.
- Caute, David (1978). The Great Fear: The Anti-Communist Purge Under Truman & Eisenhower. New York City, New York: Simon & Schuster. ISBN 0-671-22682-7.
- Chaplin, Charlie (2012) [1964]. My Autobiography. New York City, New York: Simon & Schuster. ISBN 978-1-61219-193-5.
- Davis, Robert Murray (1986). Evelyn Waugh, Writer. Cleveland, Ohio: Pilgrim Books. ISBN 978-0-937-66400-1.
- Maland, Charles J. (1991). Chaplin and American Culture: The Evolution of a Star Image. Princeton, New Jersey: Princeton University Press. ISBN 978-0-691-02860-6.
- Peary, Danny (2014). "Monsieur Verdoux". Cult Crime Movies. Discover the 35 Best Dark, Dangerous, Thrilling, and Noir Cinema Classics. New York City, New York: Workman Publishing. ISBN 978-0-76118433-1.
- Srampickal, Jacob; Mazza, Giuseppe; Baugh, Lloyd, eds. (2006). Cross Connections. Rome, Italy: Gregorian Biblical BookShop. ISBN 978-8-878-39061-4.
- Welles, Orson; Bogdanovich, Peter (1992). This is Orson Welles. New York City, New York: HarperPerennial. ISBN 978-0-060-92439-3.
