= Level 7 (novel) =

1959 novel by Mordecai Roshwald

- First edition
- Author: Mordecai Roshwald
- Language: English
- Genre: Science fiction
- Publisher: McGraw Hill
- Publication date: 1959
- Publication place: United States
- Media type: Print
- Pages: 183
- ISBN: 978-0-451-05956-7

Level 7 is a 1959 science fiction novel by American writer Mordecai Roshwald. It is told from the first-person perspective (a diary) of a modern soldier, X-127, living in the underground military complex Level 7, where he and several hundred others are expected to reside permanently. X-127 fulfills the role of 'push-button' offensive initiator of his nation's nuclear weapons capacity against an unspecified enemy. X-127 narrates life within a deep shelter before, during and after a nuclear war that wipes out the human species.

== Plot summary ==
During his forced residence at a deep underground offensive-warfare complex, X-127 is ordered to push missile firing buttons to begin World War III (which lasts a total of 2 hours and 58 minutes). From that point, humanity's few civilian survivors are situated within a collection of underground shelter complexes on Levels 1 through 5 at various depths from the irradiated surface, while military personnel already occupy the deepest and safest Levels 6 and 7. It later emerges that the orders given have been wholly automatic due to a launch on warning strategy; the war has taken place as a series of automated electronic responses to an initial accident.

X-127 and his fellow shelter inhabitants belatedly learn the criteria that had determined admission to the shelters: civilians were granted only an illusion of protection, while government officials and military personnel were granted significantly more security. Those who were assigned to launch the nuclear missiles, and their support staff, were selected for their ability to behave like machines, yet are counted upon to preserve the human spirit and rebuild the human race. X-127 and his colleagues attempt to carry on human life, but discover that institutions such as marriage and preparations for child-rearing have been hollowed out by conditions and attitudes in the antiseptic underground.

Toward the end of the novel, the inhabitants of surviving shelters within collaterally hit neutral nations, the former enemy nation and the unnamed protagonist nation gradually meet their deaths as radioactive surface contamination makes its way down past air filters and into water sources in the ground. As Level 7's safety falls into question, its inhabitants confront their growing isolation, overconfidence in technology, loneliness below a dead world, and the insanity of a society whose momentum toward annihilation exceeded its collective will to live. At last, the inhabitants of "Level 7" are wiped out after a malfunction in their nuclear power pile results in lethal contamination of their erstwhile sanctuary. They are apparently the last human beings on Earth to perish, and X-127 is the very last one at the story's conclusion. The extinction of humanity has taken four months from the time that the missiles were first fired.

== Structure ==
The book is apparently written in such a way to discourage the reader from determining which side is which. References to democracy are structured as to be just as applicable to Soviet democracy as to British or American democracy. The book contains no geographical references or individual names, but does use non-metric measurements. It is left to the individual reader to determine if this indeed identifies a Western setting or merely reflects the author's background. In any case, specific national identities are arguably irrelevant to the book's themes of dehumanization, the abstraction of nuclear warfare, and the danger that this leads to when combined with the destructive potential of the weapons involved. The novel thus acts as a warning against the nuclear arms race, as the original (but later removed) postscript makes clear:

This book is neutral - in the sense that it does not defend either the East or the West. It is not neutral in the sense that it accuses both. It is submitted for the benefit of the West and the East, as well as anybody caught in between.

The Diary of Push-Button Officer X-127 is intended as a preventative anti-radioactive medicine, good for consumption in any place in the world. It is especially offered to button-pushers, rocket constructors, nuclear physicists, megaton bomb manufacturers, "small" atomic bomb producers, and last but not least, statesmen and politicians. It is 'not' (!) effective against buttons, robots, rockets, and the bombs themselves.

Originally, the manuscript contained a preface by Martian archaeologists, who discover the diary amongst the ruins of a destroyed Earth. However, this was removed in editions published before 2003 because it was felt that it spoiled the ending of the book.

== Adaptations ==
Level 7 was adapted by J. B. Priestley for a 1966 episode of the BBC2 television science fiction drama programme Out of the Unknown. It had originally been written as a feature film adaptation, but was cut down to fit into the show's one hour time slot. It has been released on DVD with all other extant episodes of the series.

It was also adapted specifically for young students as a one-hour radio play and broadcast in 1980 by Radioteatern, the Swedish national radio theatre, under the Swedish title Nivå 7.

== Reception ==
Floyd C. Gale of Galaxy Science Fiction in 1961 rated Level 7 4.5 stars out of five, stating that X-127's story "has the strange unreality and impact of the too intense reality".

== See also ==
- Apocalyptic science fiction
- 1959 in science fiction
