= Marilyn Nash =

American actress and casting director (1926–2011)

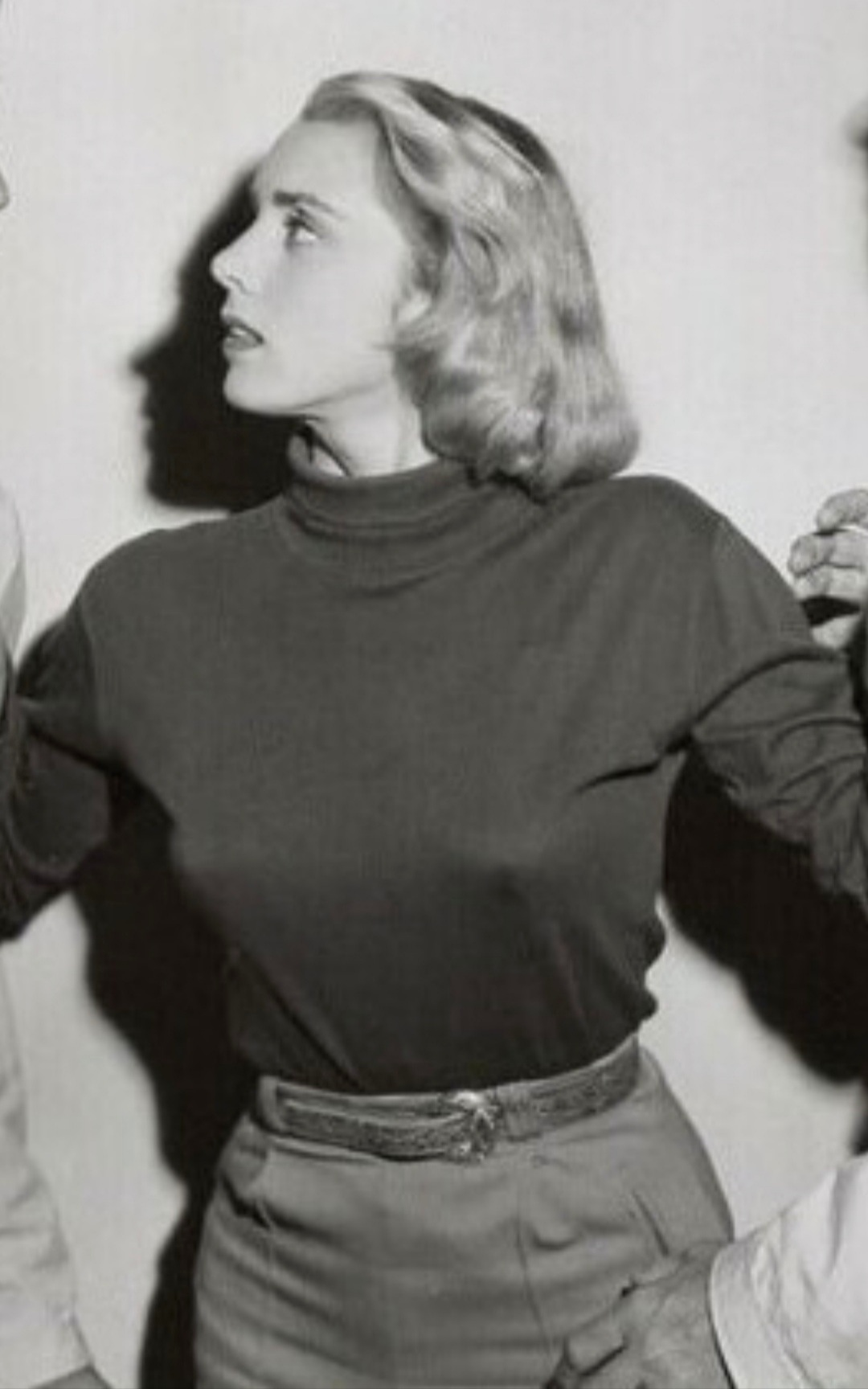
- Nash in Unknown World (1951)
- Born: October 26, 1926; Flint, Michigan, U.S.
- Died: October 6, 2011 (aged 84); Oroville, California, U.S.
- Education: University of Arizona
- Occupations: Actress; casting director
- Years active: 1947–1977
- Spouses: Philip Yordan (m. 1946–1952) Donald Franks (divorced) Mack Hill (died)
- Children: 4

Marilyn Nash (October 26, 1926 – October 6, 2011) was an American actress and casting director. She was best known for starring in the 1947 Charlie Chaplin film Monsieur Verdoux.

== Early life ==
Nash was born in Flint, Michigan, and attended the University of Arizona with the intention of pursuing medicine as her chosen career. However, her professional career path changed when she traveled to Los Angeles with her mother while attending Arizona.

== Career ==
By chance, Nash met Charlie Chaplin while playing tennis at the Beverly Hills Hotel. Chaplin quickly signed Nash as an actress in his Charlie Chaplin Studios. He then cast her in his black comedy Monsieur Verdoux, which was released in 1947.

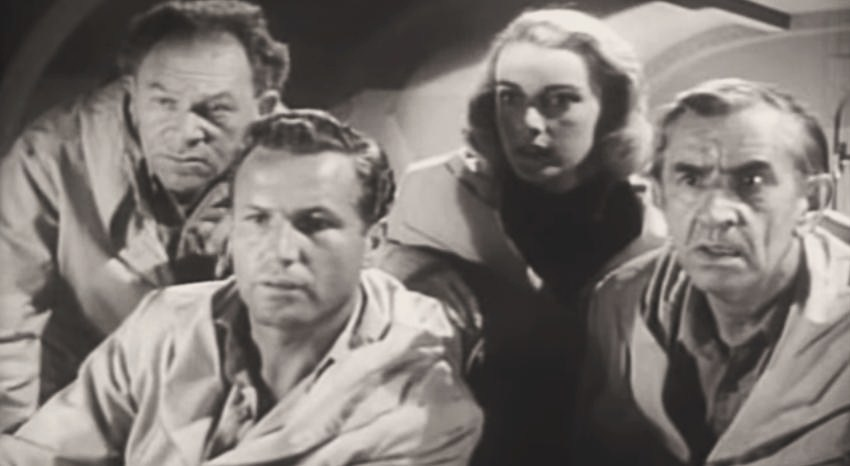
L-R: Otto Waldis, Bruce Kellogg, Marilyn Nash and Victor Kilian

Nash appeared in just one other film during her career, the 1951 science fiction adventure Unknown World, in which she portrayed a doctor. She then switched to television and stage roles during the 1950s. Her television credits include Hopalong Cassidy in 1952 and Medic in 1955.

She moved to Oroville, located in northern California, with her second husband, Dr. Donald P. Franks. There Nash worked as a casting director, specializing specifically in films shot in the region surrounding Oroville. Her casting credits included The Great Smokey Roadblock, The Klansman and The Outlaw Josey Wales.

== Personal life ==
Nash was married three times. Her first husband was screenwriter Philip Yordan, who introduced her to Hollywood's highest echelons. Nash's marriage to Yordan ended in divorce in the early 1950s. Her second marriage was to Dr. Donald P. Franks, with whom she moved to Oroville. Nash's third marriage to Mack Hill ended with Hill's death.

Nash was interviewed in the 2007 documentary, Spine Tingler! The William Castle Story, directed by Jeffrey Schwarz, which focused on the life of her longtime friend, William Castle. Her first husband, Philip Yordan, had introduced Nash to Castle during the 1950s.

== Death ==
Marilyn Nash died on October 6, 2011, at the age of 84. She was survived by four sons and six grandchildren. Her memorial service was held at the St. Augustine of Canterbury Anglican Church in Chico, California.

== Filmography ==
Year	Title	Role	Notes
1947	Monsieur Verdoux	The Girl	
1951	Unknown World	Dr. Joan Lindsey	
