= Deerslayer (1943 film) =

1943 film by Lew Landers

- Theatrical release poster
- Directed by: Lew Landers
- Written by: P. S. Harrison
- Based on: novel The Deerslayer by James Fenimore Cooper
- Produced by: E.B. Derr; P. S. Harrison
- Starring: Jean Parker; Bruce Kellogg; Larry Parks; Yvonne De Carlo
- Cinematography: Arthur Martinelli
- Production company: Cardinal Pictures
- Distributed by: Republic Pictures
- Release date: November 22, 1943
- Running time: 67 minutes
- Country: United States
- Language: English

Deerslayer is a 1943 American Western film. It is based on the 1841 novel The Deerslayer by James Fenimore Cooper. It stars Bruce Kellogg and Jean Parker, and was directed by Lew Landers.

== Plot ==
The film follows Deerslayer, a white frontiersman raised by the Mohicans, as he aids his adopted tribe after the Hurons abduct Princess Wah-Tah, the fiancée of his friend Jingo-Good. Living nearby are the Hutter family, white settlers who reside on an ark in the middle of a lake. When the Hurons attack the family, Deerslayer joins forces with scout Harry March, who is escorting a group of brides to a nearby settlement.

Both Deerslayer and Harry are attracted to Judith Hutter, although Judith secretly favors Harry. After the Hurons capture Judith’s father and Harry, Judith’s sister Hetty escapes by pretending to be insane, relying on an Indigenous superstition against harming the mentally ill. Hutter, Judith, Hetty, and Wah-Tah return to the ark, but the Hurons launch another attack in which Hetty is killed. Deerslayer, Harry, and men from the settlement eventually arrive and drive the Hurons away.

== Cast ==
- Jean Parker as Judith Hutter
- Bruce Kellogg as Deerslayer
- Larry Parks as Jingo-Good
- Yvonne De Carlo as Wah-Tah
- Warren Ashe as Harry March
- Wanda McKay as Hetty

== Production ==
The film was the first, and only, film written and produced by film reviewer P. S. Harrison, founder of the film journal Harrison's Reports.

Filming began in June 1943.

It was the first notable film role for Yvonne De Carlo who was borrowed from Paramount Studios. "She later wrote, "There have been several movie versions of The Deerslayer and this was probably the least memorable, but at the time I was thrilled to be in it."

== Reception ==
Variety opined, "Harrison draws a complete blank as a producer-scenarist."

Harrison's publication Harrison's Reports published their first review acknowledged not to have been written by Harrison. It was written by Abram F. Myers.
