= The Kraken Wakes =

1953 science fiction novel by John Wyndham

- Cover of first edition (hardcover)
- Author: John Wyndham
- Language: English
- Genre: Science fiction
- Publisher: Michael Joseph
- Publication date: July 1953
- Publication place: United Kingdom
- Media type: Print (hardback & paperback)
- Pages: 288

The Kraken Wakes is an apocalyptic science fiction novel by British writer John Wyndham, originally published by Michael Joseph in the United Kingdom in 1953, and first published in the United States in the same year by Ballantine Books under the title Out of the Deeps as a mass market paperback. The novel is also known as The Things from the Deep.

The novel is structured as a book within a book. After a short scene-setting introduction, the novel is the book written by the protagonist, radio reporter Mike Watson, chronicling the events that took place when creatures from the depths of the ocean attacked humanity. Mike and his wife Phyllis work for the (fictional) English Broadcasting Company (EBC) so are privy to decisions by government and scientific authorities, who alternatively try to counter the aliens' moves or stifle news to prevent panic. The aliens are never seen, and their origin and level of intelligence, if any, are never discerned. They are only known by their acts of violence against humanity, and their weapons of choice are not of the sort envisioned by humanity.

The title is a reference to Alfred Tennyson's sonnet The Kraken.

== Plot ==
The novel describes the course of an attack on humanity by creatures from the ocean depths, as told through the eyes of three characters: Mike Watson, a journalist for the English Broadcasting Company (EBC), his independently-minded wife and colleague Phyllis, and Professor Alastair Bocker, who is more clear-minded and far-sighted about the developing crisis than everybody else but who often alienates people by telling brutally unvarnished and unwanted truths.

Mike and Phyllis are witness to several events of the invasion, which proceeds in drawn-out phases; it takes years before the bulk of humanity even realises that the world has been invaded. In the first phase, fiery objects from outer space are seen landing in the oceans. Mike and Phyllis happen to see five of the "fireballs" falling into the sea, from the ship where they are sailing on their honeymoon. Eventually the distribution of the objects' landing points – always at ocean depths, never on land – implies intelligence.

The aliens are speculated by Bocker to come from a gas giant and thus can only survive under conditions of extreme pressure in which humans would be instantly crushed. The deepest parts of the oceans are the only parts of Earth in any way useful to them and they presumably have no need or use for dry land or even the shallower parts of the sea. Bocker puts forward the theory that the two species could co-exist, hardly noticing each other's presence. Humanity nevertheless feels threatened by this new phenomenon, particularly since the aliens show signs of intensive work to adapt the ocean deeps to their needs.

A British bathysphere is sent down to investigate and is destroyed by the aliens with the loss of two lives. The British government responds by exploding a nuclear device in the same location. The aliens' technology proves formidable, and an American attempt to use a nuclear bomb ends in disaster. Ships all over the world begin to be attacked by unknown weapons and in each case are rapidly sunk, causing havoc to the world economy. Humanity is not united in the face of the threat because of the ongoing Cold War, with the two sides often attributing the effects of the alien attacks to their human opponents or refusing to co-operate because of differing political ideals and mutual distrust.

Phase two of the war starts when humans living in isolated island communities across the world start disappearing without explanation. It eventually emerges that the aliens are "harvesting" the land by sending up "sea tanks", using mutated and genetically altered sea creatures, which capture humans from coastal settlements. Like much of what the aliens do, the reasons for these attacks are inscrutable. Working with Bocker, the Watsons witness one of these assaults on the Caribbean island of "Escondida" and their eyewitness reports convince a global public that the threat is real. Eventually coastal settlements establish such defences against these "sea tank" raids that they become far less frequent, but this only happens after raids are experienced on every continent.

In the final phase, the aliens begin melting the polar ice caps, causing the sea level to rise. London and other ports and cities are flooded, causing widespread societal collapse. The Watsons cover the story for the EBC until the radio (and human civilisation in general) ceases to exist, whereupon they can only escape to their Cornish holiday cottage which, due to the floods, now exists on an island. Ultimately, scientists in Japan develop an underwater ultrasonic weapon that destroys the aliens. The human population has been reduced to between a fifth and an eighth of its pre-invasion level and the world's climate has been significantly changed, with water levels 120 feet higher than before.

=== Plot narrative ===
Even at the end, humans have no clear idea what the aliens looked like. The most they have is some protoplasm that floated to the surface of the sea after the ultrasound weapon was used.

As the protagonist states in the book, the book aims to demonstrate that an alien invasion of Earth could take a very different form from that in The War of the Worlds; publication of the book coincided with the release of the 1953 film The War of the Worlds, an adaptation of H. G. Wells' classic work, which was both a critical and box office success.

=== Plot differences ===
Depending on the book's printed origin there are several changes to the plot:

- The US edition, entitled Out of the Deeps, cuts almost an entire chapter found in the UK edition on how the Watsons gained possession of The Midge yacht, and their aborted attempt to use a dinghy to get to Cornwall. It simply states that Freddie Whittier "found it" one day.
- The US edition skips several paragraphs detailing Mike Watson's mental state and his several subconscious attempts to commit suicide, with only Phyllis preventing his success. Instead, the US edition just states that Mike goes on holiday.
- In the US epilogue, the Watsons are tracked down by Bocker via helicopter and he explains a great deal of what has happened to the world while Mike and Phyllis have been isolated – even describing the Japanese ultrasonic device in some detail. In the UK edition they are instead approached by a neighbour in a sailboat, who gives them only a brief overview of what has happened in the world – excluding much of the detail and just mentioning that the Japanese have developed an ultrasonic device that is lethal in the depths of the sea. He tells them that their names have been broadcast on radio as important people whom the new "Council For Reconstruction" is wanting to locate and employ.
- The UK edition is less bleak than the US version, implying that humanity has already begun to rebuild and that civilisation survives – albeit at a lesser level than before.
- There are several changes for a US audience in terms of language and phraseology. Overall, the U.S. edition is significantly shorter.

== Reception ==
Groff Conklin, reviewing the American edition, characterised the novel as "sheer melodrama, sure, but melodrama spiced with wit [and] with pungent commentary on human foibles... A truly satisfying shocker." In F&SF, Boucher and McComas selected the novel as one of the best science fiction books of 1953, describing it as "humanly convincing"; they praised the novel as "a solid and admirable story of small-scale human reactions to vast terror." P. Schuyler Miller found this novel superior to The Day of the Triffids, citing its "characteristic, deceptive quietness." New York Times reviewer J. Francis McComas similarly noted that while the novel was "somewhat quieter in tone" than Triffids, it would "nevertheless exert an even more lasting effect on the imagination." One newspaper reviewer was less impressed, declaring that "[The novel's pace] is that of a slightly superior snail".

== Adaptations ==
=== Radio ===
Character	1954	1998	2016
Michael Watson	Robert Beatty	Jonathan Cake	Paul Higgins
Phyllis Watson	Grizelda Hervey	Saira Todd	Tamsin Greig
Freddie Whittier	Hugh Falkus	David Fleeshman	Richard Harrington
Dr. Alistair Bocker (Note: "Becker" in the 2016 dramatisation)	Arthur Lawrence	Russell Dixon	Richard Harrington
Capt. Winters RN	Edward Jewesbury	William Oxborrow	

The novel was adapted by John Keir Cross as a single 90-minute drama for the BBC Home Service, first broadcast on 28 April 1954. It was produced by Peter Watts. An adaptation by John Constable as a single 90-minute drama for BBC Radio 4 was first broadcast on 21 February 1998. It was produced by Susan Roberts, with music by Paul Gargill. This version was released on CD by BBC Audiobooks in 2007.

A 1965 radio adaption by Eric Cameron was recorded in Vancouver by the Canadian Broadcasting Corporation, starring Sam Paine, Shirley Broderick, Michael Irwin and Derek Walston. The duration was five half-hour shows.

BBC Radio 7 presented an unabridged reading by Stephen Moore of the novel in sixteen 30-minute episodes, produced by Susan Carson, and broadcast daily between 12 March and 2 April 2004.

On 28 May 2016 Radio 4 broadcast an adaptation by Val McDermid set in the present day, with some of the action moved from Harrogate to Birmingham and from Cornwall to Scotland. It starred Paul Higgins as Michael and Tamsin Greig as Phyllis and featured an appearance by Scotland's then First Minister Nicola Sturgeon as herself and was recorded with live accompaniment by the BBC Philharmonic orchestra. The new elements the script incorporates include an upgrade to Wyndham's predicted 100-foot rise in sea level to the worst-case figure of 70 metres envisioned over a thousand-year period by climate change experts. Such a rise sees the sea cover much of England.

=== Game ===
In 2017, Charisma Entertainment signed an agreement with John Wyndham's estate for the exclusive rights to develop an immersive, interactive game version of the novel. Their adaptation of The Kraken Wakes was released on Steam in March 2023. It was part of the Official Selection at the London Games Festival 2023. New sales on Steam were halted on 22 April 2024.

== See also ==
- 1953 in science fiction
- List of underwater science fiction works

== Sources ==
- Wyndham, John (1953). The Kraken Wakes (1st ed.). London: Michael Joseph. OCLC 2233673.
- ——————— (1953). Out of the Deeps (1st US ed.). New York: Ballantine. OCLC 981294.
- ——————— (1955). The Kraken Wakes (1st Penguin ed.). London: Penguin. OCLC 2052694.
- ——————— (1970). The Kraken Wakes. London: Penguin. ISBN 0-14-001075-0.
