= P. S. Harrison =

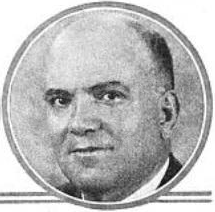
- Born: Petros Spallios; March 23, 1880; Gumlek, Turkey, Ottoman Empire
- Died: October 22, 1966 (aged 86); Salonika, Greece
- Occupations: American journalist, publisher, critic
- Writing career
- Years active: 1918–1962

P. S. Harrison (March 23,1880 – October 22, 1966), known popularly as Pete Harrison, founded the motion picture trade journal, Harrison's Reports, which was published weekly from 1919 until 1962. Until the late 1950s, he was the publisher and chief reviewer.

== Early years ==
Born as Petros Spallios in Turkey of Greek ethnicity. Working as a stoker, he jumped ship in New York in 1903. In Long Beach, California, he worked as a projectionist, and managed a nickelodeon. In 1918, he became a film reviewer for Motion Picture News with a column titled Harrison's Exhibitor Reviews.

== Harrison's Reports ==
In 1919, he founded Harrison's Reports which was published weekly from July 5, 1919 until August 11, 1962. Until the 1950s, he may have been its sole writer and reviewer (except for one review in 1943; see below).

From beginning to end, Harrison's Reports did not accept film advertising, leaving Harrison free to discuss subjects other trade periodicals would not report. Often he would advise, "It is a clean picture", meaning no subject matter relating to sex. From his editorials, it is clear he believed "dirty" movies were bad for the movie business. He took a strong stand against the practice that later became known as "product placement" that is, brand names appearing in movies. From the late 1940s through the early 1950s, his editorials also took on a strong anti-communist stance.

In the 1950s, cable TV made its first appearance, and Harrison approved efforts by theater owners to make it illegal.

In the late 1950s Harrison sold control to Al Picoult, who became managing editor. Picoult also became publisher and sold the paper in June 1959 to individuals associated with exhibitor, Allied States, which the paper had been close to and supported for many years. Harrison still retained an interest.

In July 1959, David Martin took over from Harrison as the new editor, with Harrison retiring.

In 1962, Harrison was still publishing film reviews in a publication called Harrison’s Hollywood Reviews but ceased due to health issues.

== Sued for libel ==
Harrison's editorials often discussed Will H. Hays and the Hays Office, rarely favorably. In the October 31, 1931 issue, Harrison reported that Hays Office lawyer Gabriel Hess, among others, had been indicted for criminal conspiracy in Ontario, Canada. The wording of Harrison's editorial was erroneous, and in the issue of November 14, 1931, Harrison printed a retraction/correction, including the text of the indictment as it related to Hess. The same editorial also stated that Hess had filed a libel suit against Harrison.

Libel laws of that period required virtually no proof of damage to the plaintiff. In the September 28, 1935 issue, Harrison reported that Hess had been awarded $5,200 plus costs. Harrison settled the judgment for $5,000, money he did not have, but he did have enough friends who donated or loaned him the money he needed to continue in business.

== Brief career as screenwriter and producer ==
In 1943, Harrison co-wrote and produced Deerslayer. The screenplay, adapted from the novel by James Fenimore Cooper, was co-written and produced by E.B. Derr. It is the only known production credit for Harrison, and the only writing credit of Derr, who produced several dozen movies from 1930 to 1943 (and none afterward).

The November 13, 1943 issue of Harrison's Reports reviewed the film, which was the first review in the journal that was acknowledged not to have been written by Harrison. It was written by Harrison's friend, Abram F. Myers, a leader at exhibitor Allied States.

The movie's review by Variety opined, "Harrison draws a complete blank as a producer-scenarist."
