= Unknown World =

1951 film by Terry O. Morse

- Theatrical release title lobby card
- Directed by: Terrell O. Morse
- Written by: Millard Kaufman
- Produced by: I. A. Block; J. R. Rabin
- Starring: Bruce Kellogg; Marilyn Nash; Jim Bannon; Otto Waldis
- Cinematography: Allen G. Siegler; Henry Freulich
- Edited by: Terrell O. Morse
- Music by: Ernest Gold
- Distributed by: Lippert Pictures
- Release date: October 24, 1951 (Los Angeles)
- Running time: 74 minutes
- Language: English

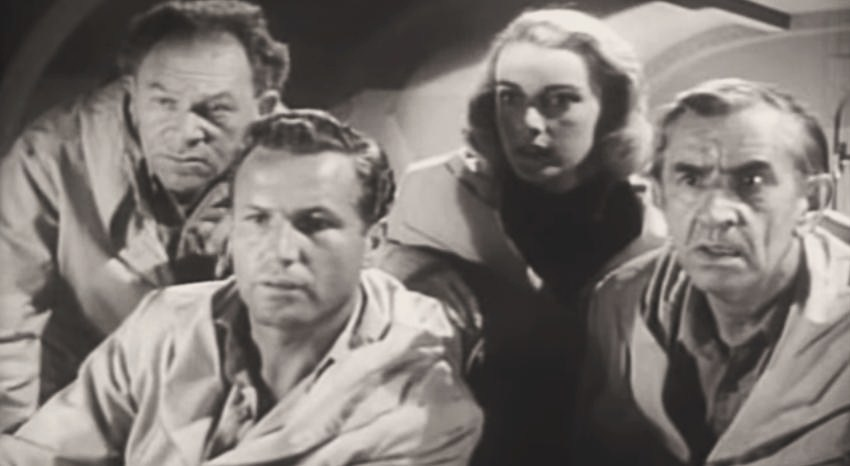
Otto Waldis, Bruce Kellogg, Marilyn Nash and Victor Kilian

Unknown World (a.k.a. Night Without Stars) is a 1951 independently made American black-and-white science fiction adventure film directed by Terrell O. Morse and starring Bruce Kellogg, Marilyn Nash, Jim Bannon and Otto Waldis. Distributed by Lippert Pictures, it was produced by Irving A. Block and Jack Rabin. The film concerns a scientific expedition seeking livable space deep beneath the Earth's surface in the event that a nuclear war makes living above ground impossible.

== Plot ==
Dr. Jeremiah Morley is concerned about an imminent nuclear war. He organizes an expedition of scientists to use a large, atomic-powered, tank-like boring machine called the Cyclotram. The tool is capable of drilling down deep through the Earth's surface in order to find an underground environment where humanity could escape and survive a future nuclear holocaust.

The expedition, consisting of Andy Ostergaard, Dr. Lindsey, Dr. Bauer, Dr. Paxton and Dr. Coleman, begins after government funding fails and private funding is provided by newspaper heir Wright Thompson, who insists on accompanying the party as a lark. A romantic rivalry soon develops between Ostergaard and Thompson for Lindsey, and during the dangerous underground expedition, two lives are lost to the perils of their adventure.

The scientists accomplish their goal and find an enormous underground expanse with a plentiful air supply, its own large ocean and phosphorescent light. However, all of the lab rabbits brought with them give birth to dead offspring. Through autopsies, it is discovered that this strange underground world has somehow rendered the rabbits, and hence any other life form, sterile. Dr. Morley is deeply depressed by this news, and when an underground volcano suddenly erupts, he fails to enter the safety of the Cyclotram and is killed.

The Cyclotram, carrying the remaining survivors, enters the underground ocean to avoid the eruption. They are soon rising toward the surface of the upper world, caught in a strong, upward-moving ocean current. They eventually break the surface near an unknown tropical island. The remaining three Thompson, Bauer, and Lindsey smile when seeing it as Bauer says "the universe is still in harmony" ending on a bittersweet but also positive, and happy note.

== Cast ==
- Victor Kilian (uncredited) as Dr. Jeremiah Morley
- Bruce Kellogg as Wright Thompson
- Otto Waldis as Dr. Max A. Bauer
- Jim Bannon as Andy Ostergaard
- Tom Handley as Dr. James Paxton
- Dick Cogan as Dr. George Coleman
- George Baxter as Carlisle Foundation Chairman
- Marilyn Nash as Dr. Joan Lindsey
- Harold Miller (uncredited) as Carlisle Foundation Board Member

== Production ==
Portions of Unknown World were filmed in Carlsbad Caverns, Bronson Caves and Nichols Canyon and at Pismo Beach.

The film's producers Jack Rabin and Irving Block were Hollywood special-effects creators.

== Reception ==
In a contemporary review for the Los Angeles Times, critic Grace Kingsley of the Los Angeles Times wrote: "Despite fictional character of the film, it was impressively exciting, original in theme and treatment and full of pseudoscientific data."

== Popular culture ==
The film is referenced in the Season 3, Episode 4 of the Netflix series 13 Reasons Why, in which the film is played at a cinema (even though the show takes place in the modern day) and is discussed briefly by the characters. The original theatrical poster for the film is seen on the wall.
