= Vandals of the Void =

1953 novel by Jack Vance

The original cover shows Dick using the rocket sled to try to flag down the Australian Star.

Vandals of the Void is a young adult science fiction novel by American writer Jack Vance, published in 1953. It was his first novel, although he was already known for his many short stories.

Vandals involves the adventures of teenager Dick Murdock, who travels from his home on Venus to work with this father at an observatory on the Moon. Dick's ship is attacked by space pirates and he becomes involved in the effort to stop them and their mysterious leader, The Basilisk.

== Plot ==
Fifteen-year-old Dick Murdock lives in Miracle Valley on Venus. He is invited to spend his summer holidays with his father Paul, who was recently promoted Chief Astronomer at an observatory on the Moon. At the space dock he hears hushed conversations among the passengers about the space liners Canopus and Capella being attacked. As he boards the African Star, he learns their sister ship, American Star, is missing. During the voyage, they come across the hulk of the American Star, adrift in The Graveyard of Space with everyone aboard dead. Another passenger bound for the Moon, Sende, appears to know more about these events than he is willing to admit.

Dick reaches the Moon without further incident. While shuttling down to the observatory they fly over the ruins of a former United Nations Security Station missile base, long abandoned as war is no longer a problem on Earth. Dick is sure he sees a light in the Station, but Sende dismisses it as a reflection. Shortly after arriving, a newly built UN corvette arrives and informs them of the presence of space pirates who attack the liners and then return with a prize crew to modify them into warships. They ask the observatory to keep track of ships moving through The Graveyard, hoping to spot the pirate ships and find their base of operations.

Dick makes friends with a prospector, "Crazy Sam" Baxter, who takes Dick on prospecting trips on his rocket sled. When later questioned by the UN crew, Sam claims he has met native moon people who live underground in tunnels. Later, Dick is listening to his radio when he hears a broadcast consisting of letters and digits, some form of code. The next morning he learns the African Star has been attacked. Dick attempts to decode the message and realizes they were entries in a new star atlas being developed at the observatory. The message indicates the route of the Star.

Days later, Sam is killed in an accident and Dick retrieves his maps of the natural tunnels under the UN base. Dick returns to the observatory to find his father has been called away to Venus to tend to his mother. He realizes this is a ruse and flies the sled to the ship. He commandeers the liner, changing course just before they are intercepted by two of the pirate ships. They return to the observatory where they are once again met by the UN crew. They note that the radio messages Dick heard were not being heard on Earth, meaning they must be short range signals. Dick realizes the pirates are in the Security Station. He sneaks out of the observatory and uses Sam's maps to enter the base unseen. As he watches the pirates eat, the Basilisk arrives, a man with enormous yellow hypnotic eyes. Dick is enthralled and captured, but later escapes with a photograph of the Basilisk.

He returns to the base to find everyone is out looking for him. While he develops the photograph, he is approached by Professor Dexter, the base's second-in-command. Dick recognizes his eyes as those of the Basilisk. Dexter realizes he has been identified and attempts to kill Dick by locking him in the darkroom with prussic acid, but Sende arrives and interrupts Dexter's parting evil monologue. Dexter rockets to the Security Station and launches his pirate ships to attack a city on Mars.

Dick and Sende, revealed to be a UN operative, are picked up by the newly forming Space Navy as they attempt to intercept the pirate fleet. They meet over Mars, where the small Navy ships are outgunned by the much larger pirates. A running battle ensues, and the tide is turned by the arrival of a much larger Navy cruiser, fresh from the shipyards. Dexter attempts to escape in a small ship, but Sende shoots it down with a single well-aimed shot. In the aftermath, the Commodore of the Navy invites Dick to join their forces once he is old enough.

== Reception ==
Given Vance was already fairly well known at the time as a short story author, it is surprising that the novel seems to have seen little coverage in the press when it was published. It is mentioned in more recent works; Science Fiction and Fantasy Book Review, which calls it "mediocre fiction" and "badly dated". James Reasoner reviewed it in 2013 as part of a "lost novels of..." collection, concluding that "I would have absolutely loved this book when I was twelve years old. Heck, I enjoyed it a lot now, and I'm considerably older than twelve."
