= Dodkin's Job =

1959 novel by Jack Vance

Dodkin's Job is a dystopian science fiction novella by Jack Vance, written in 1959. It is on the theme of the organization theory of human society, which Vance depicts as a complex, interconnected machine. When society is a well-ordered system, all of the human parts interconnect well and the society will function well. However, in the story, a depressed man working for a huge corporation refuses to cooperate when the firm launches an efficiency initiative. The story combines the dystopian themes with satirical humour.

The novella first appeared in Astounding Science Fiction, and in Future Tense (1964), a collection of short works by Vance. It was later included in anthologies edted by Jerry Pournelle and Robert Silverberg. The story starts with a quote from Leslie Penton's First Principles of Organization, which argues that when humans are converted into "cogs" in an organization, they lose an important part of their freedom.

== Plot ==
In a future society, all people are organized using a strict, scientifically designed rational system. They are assessed, given a skills rating, and assigned to the job that best suits their natural talents and personality type. Their schedule, living quarters, the type of food they eat, and even their sexual experiences are assigned by a system. Conformity and compliance with rules are rewarded with access to private telescreens, individual rooms, access to better cafeterias, and a higher grade of erotic services coupons.

Luke Grogatch, an unhappy 40-year-old, is a bitter nonconformist who dislikes all of the jobs he has been assigned. After unsuccessfully trying a number of positions, Grogatch is demoted to a low-level job as night sewer maintenance worker, even though he is intelligent. He works for a huge corporation run by computers and a vast, labyrinthine bureaucracy. At first, he manages to keep up his morale in the mindless job by distracting himself after work with the company's group recreation facilities and communal telescreens, and using the lower-tier erotic services coupons he receives.

When the vast, bureaucratic management issues an efficiency improvement memo that extends the workday by three hours, all of the other workers accept it. Grogatch decides to resist the directive and undermine the order of society. Grogatch tries to complain, but each bureaucrat he talks to says the work hours issue is not their responsibility, and then “passes the buck” by telling Grogatch to see another department. Even though he is not officially allowed to raise his concerns with senior management, Grogatch uses his sewer worker uniform to get access to the offices of the top executives.
