= Victor Kilian =

American actor (1891-1979)

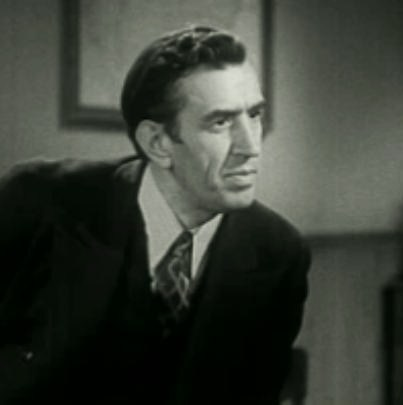
- Kilian in Convict's Code (1939)
- Born: Victor Arthur Kilian; March 6, 1891; Jersey City, New Jersey, U.S.
- Died: March 11, 1979 (aged 88); Hollywood, California, U.S.
- Resting place: Westwood Village Memorial Park Cemetery, Los Angeles, California, U.S.
- Occupation: Actor
- Years active: 1909–1979
- Spouse: Daisy Johnson (m. 1915; died 1961)

Victor Arthur Kilian (March 6, 1891 – March 11, 1979) was an American actor who was blacklisted by the Hollywood movie studio bosses in the 1950s.

== Early life, career, and homicide ==
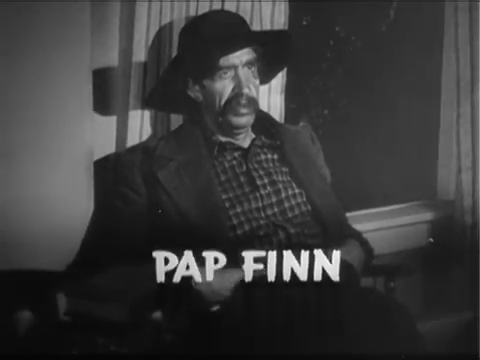
Victor Kilian in The Adventures of Huckleberry Finn (1939)

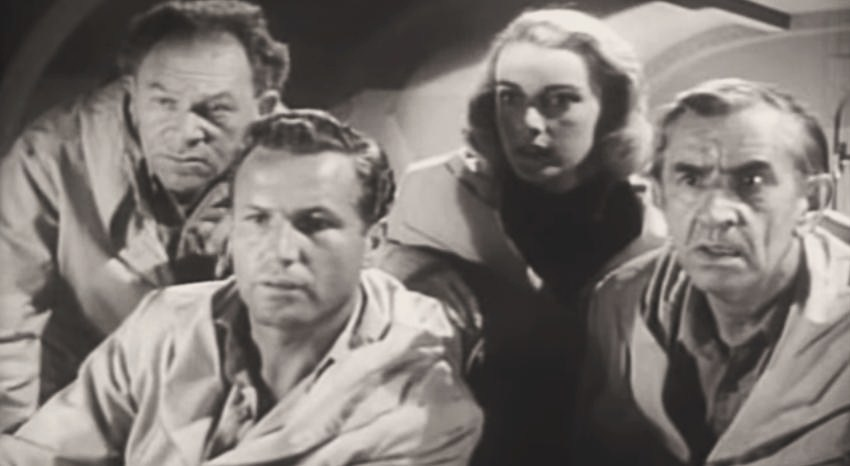
From Unknown World (1951), L-R: Otto Waldis, Bruce Kellogg, Marilyn Nash and Victor Kilian

Born in Jersey City, New Jersey, Victor Kilian began his career in entertainment at the age of 18 by joining a vaudeville company. In the mid-1920s, he began to perform in Broadway plays and by the end of the decade had made his debut in motion pictures. For the next two decades, he made a good living as a character actor in secondary or minor roles in films such as The Adventures of Tom Sawyer (1938). He was frequently cast as a villain. While staging a fight scene with John Wayne for a 1942 film, Kilian suffered a serious injury that resulted in the loss of one eye.

He was an early resident of Free Acres, a social experimental community developed by Bolton Hall in Berkeley Heights, New Jersey.

During the McCarthyism of the 1950s, Kilian was blacklisted for his political beliefs, but because the Actors' Equity Association refused to go along with the ban, Kilian was able to earn a living by returning to perform on stage. After Hollywood's blacklisting ended, he began doing guest roles on television series during the 1970s. He is best known for his role as Grandpa Larkin (aka The Fernwood Flasher) in the television soap opera spoof Mary Hartman, Mary Hartman (1976). Kilian's wife, Daisy Johnson, to whom he had been married for 46 years, died in 1961.

In 1979, Kilian appeared in an episode of All in the Family, "The Return of Stephanie's Father", portraying a desk clerk in a seedy hotel. In the same episode, fellow veteran Hollywood character actor Charles Wagenheim (1896–1979) appeared as a bum in the hotel's lobby. Just weeks before the episode aired, on March 6, 1979 (Kilian's 88th birthday), the 83 year-old Wagenheim was bludgeoned to death in his Hollywood apartment after confronting his caregiver, Stephanie Boone, whom he accused of stealing from him and forging his signature on checks. Five days after his 88th birthday, on March 11, 1979, Kilian, who lived alone in Hollywood just blocks from Wagenheim, also was beaten to death by burglars in his apartment after returning home from grocery shopping.

On March 25, 1979, All in the Family posthumously aired the episode "The Return of Stephanie's Father", with Wagenheim's and Kilian's last screen performances. Victor Kilian's cremated remains were scattered in the rose garden at Westwood Village Memorial Park Cemetery.

== Selected filmography ==
- Gentlemen of the Press (1929) - McPhee - Reporter (uncredited)
- The Wiser Sex (1932) - Ed
- Before Morning (1933) - House Detective (uncredited)
- Air Hawks (1935) - Tiny Davis
- After the Dance (1935) - Kennedy
- Atlantic Adventure (1935) - Joe Brannigan (uncredited)
- The Public Menace (1935) - Joe
- The Girl Friend (1935) - Sunshine Minton
- Bad Boy (1935) - Sid
- Riffraff (1936) - "Flytrap"
- The Music Goes 'Round (1936) - Marshall
- The Road to Glory (1936) - Tall Sergeant
- Shakedown (1936) - Caretaker
- Blackmailer (1936) - Photographer (uncredited)
- Ramona (1936) - Father Gaspara
- Adventure in Manhattan (1936) - Mark Gibbs
- Banjo on My Knee (1936) - Mr. Slade
- Lady from Nowhere (1936) - Zeke Hopper
- Fair Warning (1937) - Sam
- Seventh Heaven (1937) - Gobin
- The League of Frightened Men (1937) - Pitney Scott
- It's All Yours (1937) - City Clerk
- It Happened in Hollywood (1937) - Slim
- Tovarich (1937) - Gendarme
- The Adventures of Tom Sawyer (1938) - Sheriff
- Gold Diggers in Paris (1938) - Gendarme
- Marie Antoinette (1938) - Guard in Louis' Cell (uncredited)
- Prison Break (1938) - Fenderson
- Passport Husband (1938) - Gangster (uncredited)
- Boys Town (1938) - The Sheriff
- Orphans of the Street (1938) - Dave Farmer
- Fighting Thoroughbreds (1939) - Wilson
- Convict's Code (1939) - C.W. Bennett
- Paris Honeymoon (1939) - Old Villager a.k.a. The Ancient
- St. Louis Blues (1939) - Sheriff Burdick
- The Adventures of Huckleberry Finn (1939) - Pap Finn
- Never Say Die (1939) - Man Who Loads Pistols (uncredited)
- The Return of the Cisco Kid (1939) - Bartender at Stage Stop
- Only Angels Have Wings (1939) - Sparks
- Blackmail (1939) - Warden Frank Miller (uncredited)
- Dust Be My Destiny (1939) - Doc Saunders
- The Hunchback of Notre Dame (1939) - Esmeralda's Hangman (uncredited)
- Invisible Stripes (1939) - Loading Dock Foreman (uncredited)
- Abe Lincoln in Illinois (1940) - Minor Role (uncredited)
- Little Old New York (1940) - DeWitt
- Young Tom Edison (1940) - Mr. Dingle
- Virginia City (1940) - Abraham Lincoln
- Dr. Cyclops (1940) - Steve Baker
- 'Til We Meet Again (1940) - Herb McGillis
- King of the Lumberjacks (1940) - Joe (Saloon Owner)
- Torrid Zone (1940) - Carlos
- Florian (1940) - Junk Man (uncredited)
- Out West with the Peppers (1940) - Jim Anderson
- All This, and Heaven Too (1940) - Gendarme
- The Return of Frank James (1940) - Preacher
- City for Conquest (1940) - Bill Poster (uncredited)
- Barnyard Follies (1940) - Hiram Crabtree
- Tugboat Annie Sails Again (1940) - Sam
- They Knew What They Wanted (1940) - The Photographer
- The Mark of Zorro (1940) - Boatman (uncredited)
- Santa Fe Trail (1940) - Dispatch Rider (uncredited)
- Chad Hanna (1940) - Potato Man
- Western Union (1941) - Charlie
- Blood and Sand (1941) - Priest
- Sergeant York (1941) - Andrews (uncredited)
- I Was a Prisoner on Devil's Island (1941) - Guissart
- Mob Town (1941) - Uncle Lon Barker
- Secrets of the Lone Wolf (1941) - Colonel Costals
- You're in the Army Now (1941) - Soldier (uncredited)
- A Date with the Falcon (1942) - Max Carlson (uncredited)
- Reap the Wild Wind (1942) - Mathias Widgeon
- This Gun for Hire (1942) - Drew
- Atlantic Convoy (1942) - Otto
- The Ox-Bow Incident (1943) - Darby
- Hitler's Madman (1943) - Janek (uncredited)
- Bomber's Moon (1943) - Henryk van Seeler
- Johnny Come Lately (1943) - Tramp in Box Car
- Five Were Chosen (1944)
- Uncertain Glory (1944) - Latour (uncredited)
- The Adventures of Mark Twain (1944) - Higgins (uncredited)
- Kismet (1944) - Jehan (uncredited)
- Barbary Coast Gent (1944) - Curry Slake
- Meet Me in St. Louis (1944) - Baggage Man (uncredited)
- Dangerous Passage (1944) - Buck Harris, 1st Mate
- Belle of the Yukon (1944) - Professor Salsbury
- Dillinger - Pa Dillinger (uncredited)
- Escape in the Desert (1945) - Rancher (uncredited)
- Bedside Manner (1945) - Board Member (uncredited)
- Behind City Lights (1945) - Daniel Lowell
- Spellbound (1945) - Sheriff (uncredited)
- The Spanish Main (1945) - Santa Madre Captain
- The Fighting Guardsman (1946) - Montebar (uncredited)
- Little Giant (1946) - Gus Anderson (salesman)
- Smoky (1946) - J.P. Mingo - Junkman (uncredited)
- The Yearling (1946) - Captain (uncredited)
- Duel in the Sun (1946) - Gambler (uncredited)
- Gentleman's Agreement (1947) - Olsen (uncredited)
- Northwest Stampede (1948) - Mel Saunders
- Yellow Sky (1948) - Bartender (uncredited)
- I Shot Jesse James (1949) - Soapy
- Rimfire (1949) - Sheriff Jim Jordan
- Colorado Territory (1949) - Missouri Sheriff (uncredited)
- The Wyoming Bandit (1949) - Ross Tyler
- Reign of Terror (1949) - Jailer (uncredited)
- Madame Bovary (1949) - Speaker at Agricultural Show (uncredited)
- Stars in My Crown (1950) - Ned (uncredited)
- The Flame and the Arrow (1950) - Mazzoni - Apothecary
- The Old Frontier (1950) - Judge Ames
- The Showdown (1950) - Hemp
- No Way Out (1950) - Father (uncredited)
- The Return of Jesse James (1950) - Westfield Sheriff Rigby
- The Bandit Queen (1950) - Jose Montalvo
- One Too Many (1950) - Frank J. Emery
- The Lemon Drop Kid (1951) - Mr. Egan - Landlord (uncredited)
- Passage West (1951) - Messenger (uncredited)
- The Tall Target (1951) - John K. Gannon - Flyer Express Engineer (uncredited)
- Unknown World (1951) - Dr. Jeremiah Morley (uncredited)
- Face to Face (1952) - Jasper Morgan (segment: "The Bride Comes to Yellow Sky") (uncredited)
- The Brady Bunch (1970) - Mr. Stoner (episode: "The Treasure of Sierra Avenue")
- The Jeffersons (1975) - Uncle Bertram Willis (episodes: "Uncle Bertram" and "Jenny's Grandparents")
- All in the Family (1979) - Mr. Burkvist (episode: "Edith Gets Fired"), clerk (episode: "The Return of Stephanie's Father")

== See also ==
- List of unsolved deaths
