= Satoshi Nakamura =

Japanese computer scientist (1958-)

Satoshi Nakamura (中村 哲, Nakamura Satoshi; born 1958) is a Japanese computer scientist specialising in speech and language processing. He is a Presidential Chair Professor in the School of Data Science at the Chinese University of Hong Kong, Shenzhen; Professor Emeritus at the Nara Institute of Science and Technology (NAIST); and Honorary professor of Karlsruhe Institute of Technology, Germany. He is widely recognised for pioneering work in speech-to-speech translation, having led international initiatives such as C-Star, A-Star and the International Workshop on Spoken Language Translation (IWSLT), and currently chairs the ISCA Special Interest Group on Spoken Language Translation (SIG-SLT).

His research covers speech recognition and synthesis, spoken-dialog systems, simultaneous translation, natural-language processing and data-science applications. Earlier in his career he directed the ATR Spoken Language Communication Laboratories (2000–2008), headed Keihanna Research Laboratories at the National Institute of Information and Communications Technology (NICT) (2009–2010), and founded the Data Science Center at NAIST (2017–2021). He is a Fellow of IEEE, ISCA, IPSJ and ATR, and received the Antonio Zampolli Prize in 2012.

== Education ==
He received his B.S. in Electrical Engineering from Kyoto Institute of Technology in 1981 and his Ph.D. in Information Science from Kyoto University in 1992.

== Career timeline ==
- 1981 – Researcher, Central Research Laboratory, Sharp Corporation, Nara, Japan
- 1986–1989 – Researcher, ATR Interpreting Telephony Research Laboratory, Kyoto, Japan
- 1989–1993 – Researcher, Information System Laboratory, Sharp Corporation, Nara, Japan
- 1994–1999 – Associate Professor, Nara Institute of Science and Technology (NAIST), Japan
- Mar–Sep 1996 – Visiting Professor, Prof. James Flanagan’s Lab, Rutgers University, United States
- 2000–2004 – Department Head, ATR Spoken Language Communication Laboratories, Japan
- 2003 – present – Honorarprofessor, Karlsruhe Institute of Technology (KIT), Germany
- 2005–2008 – Director, ATR Spoken Language Communication Laboratories, Japan
- 2008–2012 – Principal Investigator, MASTAR Project, Cabinet Office (Japan)
- 2009 – Executive Researcher, National Institute of Information and Communications Technology (NICT), Japan
- 2010 – Director General, Keihanna Research Laboratories, NICT, Japan
- 2011 – Full Professor, Graduate School of Information Science, NAIST, Japan
- 2017–2021 – Director, Data Science Center, NAIST, Japan
- 2017–2021 – Councilor, NAIST, Japan
- 2017–2021 – Principal Investigator, Tourism Information Analysis Team, AIP Center, RIKEN, Japan
- Nov 2023–Mar 2024 – Visiting Professor, School of Data Science, CUHK Shenzhen, China
- Apr 2024 – Full Professor, School of Data Science, CUHK Shenzhen, China
- Jan 2025 – Presidential Chair Professor, School of Data Science, CUHK Shenzhen, China

== Research ==
His research spans fundamental speech technology, multimodal interaction, and applied data science. Key areas include:

- Speech-to-speech and simultaneous translation – Principal investigator of international programs such as C-Star, A-Star and ATR-MATRIX; his group introduced latency-aware metrics (e.g., Average Token Delay) and built simultaneous speech-translation systems for IWSLT 2023–2024.
- Spoken dialog and conversational AI – Developed reinforcement-learning and knowledge-integrated dialog models and released large corpora for persuasion and healthcare conversations published at SIGDIAL and IWSDS.
- Embodied conversational agents for behavioural health – Created automated social-skills-training and CBT agents for autism spectrum and mood disorders, validated with EEG and eye-tracking studies.
- Neural ASR/TTS and speech generation – Proposed the Machine Speech Chain, code-switch ASR/TTS, incremental TTS, expressive voice conversion and other models that have shaped ZeroSpeech, Blizzard and Voice Conversion Challenge tracks.
- Multimodal analytics and data science – Led tourism information analytics at RIKEN AIP and healthcare/biometrics projects at NAIST Data Science Center, applying speech and language technologies to large-scale behavioural data.
- Standardisation and community leadership – Contributed to ITU-T standards on network-based speech translation, chairs the ISCA SIG-SLT, and has authored 600+ peer-reviewed papers across venues such as IEEE Access, IJHCS, and Computational Visual Media (2024).

== Honors and awards ==
- 1992 – Awaya Award, Acoustical Society of Japan
- 2001 – Interaction 2001 Best Paper Award, Information Processing Society of Japan
- 2007 – Telecom System Award, Telecommunications Advancement Foundation
- 2007 – Yamashita Award, Information Processing Society of Japan
- 2007 – Docomo Mobile Science Award, Mobile Communication Foundation
- 2007 – AAMT Nagao Award, Asia-Pacific Association for Machine Translation
- 2007 – Eurographics Animation Theatre Program Committee Award
- 2008 – Kiyasu Award, Information Processing Society of Japan
- 2008 – Award for Distinguished Achievements in Acoustics, Acoustical Society of Japan
- 2010 – Commendation for Science and Technology by the Minister of Education, Culture, Sports, Science and Technology (Japan)
- 2010 – Best Research Award, Japanese Society for Artificial Intelligence
- 2011 – International Cooperation Award, ITU Association of Japan
- 2011 – Commendation for Science and Technology in Information Technology by the Minister of Internal Affairs and Communications (Japan)
- 2012 – ELRA Antonio Zampolli Prize
- 2014 – APSIPA Best Paper Award
- 2014 – IEEE Spoken Language Technology Workshop Poster Award
- 2015 – IEICE Best Paper Award
- 2016 – IEEE Fellow
- 2016 – EMNLP Best Short Paper Award
- 2017 – Itakura Award, Acoustical Society of Japan
- 2017 – IBM Faculty Award
- 2017 – IPSJ Fellow
- 2018 – Yahoo! JAPAN Award, Information Processing Society of Japan
- 2019 – ANLP Best Paper Award
- 2019 – Best Paper Award, Workshop on NLP for Conversational AI
- 2019 – Google AI Focused Research Award
- 2020 – ISCA Fellow
- 2020 – IWSDS Best Paper Award
- 2020 – 1st Place, MOTS Challenge 2020 (ReMOTS) at CVPR 2020
- 2021 – Best Research Award, Japanese Society for Artificial Intelligence
- 2021 – Special Award, Association for Natural Language Processing (Japan)
- 2022 – Google AI Focused Research Award
- 2023 – IEEE Life Fellow

== Selected publications ==
- Nakamura, S. et al. “ATR-MATRIX: Speech-to-speech translation system.” In: *Proceedings of ICSLP*, 2000.
- Kano, Y.; Sudoh, K.; & Nakamura, S. “Average Token Delay: A Latency Metric for Simultaneous Translation.” *Interspeech*, 2023.
- Koshkin, R.; Sudoh, K.; & Nakamura, S. “LLMs Are Zero-Shot Context-Aware Simultaneous Translators.” *EMNLP*, 2024.
- Ishibashi, Y.; Yokoi, S.; Sudoh, K.; & Nakamura, S. “Subspace Representations for Soft Set Operations and Sentence Similarities.” *NAACL*, 2024.
