= The Enemy Stars =

1959 novel by Poul Anderson

- First US edition
- Author: Poul Anderson
- Cover artist: Eric Carle
- Language: English
- Genre: Science fiction
- Published: 1959 (J. B. Lippincott) – US
- Publication place: United States
- Pages: 189

The Enemy Stars, is a science fiction novel by American writer Poul Anderson, published in 1959 by J.B Lippincott in the US and by Longmans in Canada. Originally published in Astounding Science Fiction under the title We Have Fed Our Sea__, it was a nominee for the 1959 Hugo Award for Best Novel. The original title refers to a line in a poem by Rudyard Kipling.

== Premise ==
In the scientific speculation that underlies the story, humanity has reached out to the stars in ships that move at half the speed of light. At that speed the ships will take years, decades, even centuries to reach their destinations. And yet the ships' crews serve month-long tours of duty, teleporting to and from their bases on Earth and other worlds instantaneously through what Anderson calls a mattercaster. At the end of Chapter 5 Anderson provides a description of how a mattercaster works.

In 1967, Gerald Feinberg hypothesized the existence of tachyons as particles represented by the imaginary solutions of relativistic quantum wave equations, such as the Klein–Gordon equation. To accommodate that new hypothesis Anderson rewrote his description.

== Plot summary ==
The first ship that Humanity sent into interstellar space was the Southern Cross, sent on a four-and-a-half century voyage to Alpha Crucis. On autopilot she accelerated at over one hundred gees until she was flying away from Sol at half the speed of light. Then the autopilot shut down the ion drive, the ship went into free fall, and the first crew went into the mattercaster on Earth's moon to be teleported aboard the ship for their month-long tour of duty. Ten generations later, when she is one hundred light years from Sol, Southern Cross receives her last crew, though the four men who come through the mattercaster do not know that they are the last crew.

Terangi Maclaren, an astrophysicist of Polynesian ancestry, has convinced officials of the Protectorate, the dictatorship under which he lives, to take a great risk. Previous crews have made observations indicating that Southern Cross will pass close enough to a burnt-out star that she could be diverted, decelerate, and go into orbit around it in order that the crew can make further studies. The risk comes from the fact that if the crew cannot find a roughly asteroid-sized body to provide feedstock for the mattercaster, the Exploration Authority will not be able to teleport enough mercury to the ship to provide enough propellant for Southern Cross to resume her journey to Alpha Crucis. More playboy than scientist, Maclaren is assigned to the mission he had promoted.

David Ryerson is a graviticist/tachyonicist born and raised in Scotland's Outer Hebrides. He has just married an Indonesian woman, Tamara Suwito, and has brought her home to meet his father, Captain Magnus Ryerson. The couple are preparing to emigrate to a planet just opened for colonization, but Magnus demands that David first serve a tour on the Southern Cross. Reluctantly David agrees, if only for the extra pay.

Seiichi Nakamura lives on Sarai, an Earth-like moon of a gas-giant planet in the 40 Eridani system. He has been selected to serve as Southern Cross's pilot and captain on this particular tour. Old traumas haunt him and his Zen discipline cannot relieve him of his fear of the dark star.

Chang Sverdlov, on Krasna, one of the planets of Tau Ceti, has been assigned to be Southern Cross's engineer. Member of a nascent revolutionary movement, he is told to observe anything about the dead star that may be of military value. He is also being sent "out of town" to allay suspicions that are beginning to arise regarding his loyalty to the Protectorate.

Maclaren and Ryerson travel from Earth to the moon together and from the moon teleport onto the Southern Cross. On the ship they find Nakamura and Sverdlov waiting for them and the four men immediately set to the tasks necessary to bring Southern Cross as close as possible to the dead star. As Nakamura backs the ship down, to put its trajectory into a close orbit around the star, the ion drive suddenly begins to vaporize itself and the mattercaster web: they have encountered interference from the star's magnetic field, which is far stiffer than anyone thought possible. In order to avoid crashing into the star Nakamura must fire the drive enough to put the ship into a stable orbit, doing so at the expense of further damage to the drive's ion accelerators and to the mattercaster web.

After making the necessary inspections Sverdlov states that the drive can be repaired well enough that the ship can maneuver around the dead star as they need and Ryerson states that he can repair the mattercaster web only to a certain point. To make a full repair of the mattercaster, so that the men can go home, Ryerson needs four kilograms of pure germanium in order to build the large and complex transistors that the web needs. Sverdlov and Ryerson go outside to repair the drive and while Nakamura is testing the drive under Sverdlov's directions, Sverdlov slips and falls, breaches his spacesuit, and dies.

Some months later the men find a planet, a ball of nickel-iron alloy a little smaller than Earth. From this planet's material they will extract the germanium that Ryerson needs. But first they must land Southern Cross on the planet and the ship was not meant to land on a planet. Using material scavenged from the ship's landers and other non-essential items, the three men build a tripod to protect the ion drive and the mattercaster web. Nakamura backs the ship down onto the planet, but one leg of the tripod buckles. Acting intuitively, Nakamura turns the ship to protect the mattercaster, but in so doing he puts the control turret he occupies directly under one thousand tonnes of crash-landing spaceship.

For weeks Maclaren cuts pieces out of the planet's metal surface and Ryerson extracts the little germanium they contain. Even on short rations they are running out of food. They get the germanium they need, Ryerson makes his transistors and finishes repairing the web, and then the two men begin the task of using their uncalibrated mattercaster to find a resonance that will take them to another ship or base, whence they can be rescued.

One day, as they are on the verge of starving to death, they find a resonance. In desperation Ryerson teleports himself to the receiver, leaving the more cautious Maclaren behind. Some time later Maclaren decides to follow Ryerson, but before he can do so Ryerson returns... draped across the arms of an alien wearing a spacesuit full of chlorine.

Some months later, still recovering his health from his ordeal, Maclaren goes to Sumatra to meet Ryerson's widow and give her his few small personal possessions. He tells her that the alien had examined his cobbled-together mattercaster, had located and marked resonances that led to his people's ships or bases, and then teleported back to his own ship. It had taken another week for Maclaren to find the resonance that took him to a human base, whence he was rescued.

Taking Tamara with him, Maclaren flies his aircar to the Outer Hebrides. She points out the house where Magnus Ryerson waits for them. Maclaren has come to tell Magnus about his son and to answer the old man's questions. Tamara's outburst, crying out the uselessness of going to the stars, touches Maclaren's own doubts. But Magnus simply says, "For that is our doom and our pride," quoting from Rudyard Kipling's poem "The Song of the Dead". Magnus goes on to read from that poem the stanza that begins, "We have fed our sea for a thousand years...."

Maclaren understands then and asks Magnus for his blessing.

=== Sequel – "The Ways of Love" ===
First published in Destinies, Vol 1, No 2 (Jan 1979), this novelette was first incorporated into The Enemy Stars in the 1987 Baen Books edition. The story is told in the first person, narrated by Voah, the alien who had brought David Ryerson's body back to the Southern Cross.

Native to Arvel, a planet with a chlorine-rich atmosphere, Voah-and-Rero, husband and wife, had been serving a tour of duty on the starship Fleetwing, also headed toward Alpha Crucis, when David Ryerson teleported into their receiver and died. Voah describes how he-and-Rero made the decision that he would take Ryerson's body back to Southern Cross and how he had helped Maclaren by finding and marking the resonances that led to Arvelan mattercasters.

Now, ten years later, he-and-Rero have come to Earth to participate in the tenth anniversary celebration of that first contact. In the midst of the celebration the Arvelans are taken secretly to Taiwan to meet with Terangi and Tamara Maclaren. The secret trip has been arranged by Vincent Indigo, their guide and general factotum while they are on Earth. Voah-and-Rero hope that in the time they spend with the Maclarens they will gain new insights into the nature of humans as they differ from Arvelans.

During the visit Indigo and three henchgoons invade the Maclaren house and kidnap the Arvelans. When it becomes clear that the kidnappers intend to kill one of them, Voah-and-Rero attack them, killing two of the terrorists and, with the help of Terangi, disabling the other two. Under interrogation Indigo admits that the kidnapping was carried out at the behest of the dictator to convince the Arvelans to withdraw from contact with humans. Voah then decides that he will recommend to his people that they negotiate a treaty that will lead to humans and Arvelans using each other's mattercaster networks.

== Explanation of the novel's title ==
The Enemy Stars was originally published in Astounding Science Fiction under the title We Have Fed Our Sea__. That title refers to the first stanza of the second part of Rudyard Kipling's poem "The Song of the Dead", which Anderson quoted at the end of his story. The poem refers to the British sailors who have died at sea in their efforts to give England mastery of Earth's oceans, and Anderson discerned an analogous sacrifice that will be made by Terrans in their efforts to reach the stars.

== Awards and nominations ==
The book was nominated for the Hugo award in 1959 under its original title, We Have Fed Our Sea__.

== Sources ==
- Barron, Neil (2004). Anatomy of Wonder: A Critical Guide to Science Fiction, 5th Edition. Westport, CT: Libraries Unlimited. Pp. 95–96. ISBN 1-59158-171-0.
- Tuck, Donald H. (1974). The Encyclopedia of Science Fiction and Fantasy. Chicago: Advent. pg. 9. ISBN 0-911682-20-1.
