= Ged Maybury =

New Zealand children's book author

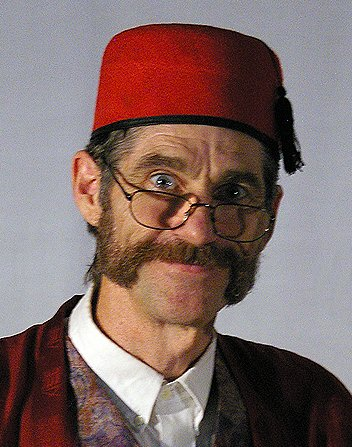
- Ged Maybury in steampunk outfit, 2011
- Born: 20.03.1953; Christchurch, New Zealand
- Occupations: Novelist, short story author, screenwriter
- Writing career
- Genres: Science fiction, Children

Ged Maybury is a children's book author. He was born in Christchurch, New Zealand, in 1953, spent his childhood in Dunedin, and has been based in Australia since 2002. He has been writing books for children and young adults since 1984. He was a finalist in the AIM New Zealand Children's Book Awards 1994 with The Triggerstone, and in the NZ Post Children's Book Awards 2001; with Crab Apples. He writes science fiction, in particular of the steampunk subgenre, and humour.

In 2019, he digitally re-released his 'Horse Apples' series, including the missing fourth book: Dinosaur Apples, set in Australia. In the same year, he released five other children's books and a six-book Steampunk series “Across the Stonewind Sky”.

== Bibliography ==
- Timetwister (also known as Time Twister), 1986
- Silicone Stew, 1990
- StarTroopers, 1991
- The Triggerstone, 1993
- The Seventh Robe, 1993
- The Rebel Masters, 1995
- Hive of the Starbees, 1995
- Horse Apples, 1998
- Crab Apples, 2000
- I Am Leatherman, 2001
- Pig Apples, 2002
- Scuttle and the Zipzaps, 2003
- Snowcave Inn, 2005
- Nosebleed, 2013 (published by Blake Education)
- Tears Before Half Time, 2019
- Girl Germs, 2019
- The Sizzlewitz List, 2019
- Horse Apples, 2019
- Crab Apples, 2019
- Pig Apples, 2019
- Dinosaur Apples, 2019
- Me Ma Supial, 2019
- Steampunk Series
  - Across the Stonewind Sky, 2019
  - Into the Heart of Varste, 2019
  - Hoverrim the Hunted, 2019
  - Into the Lair of LeRoosh, 2019
  - Voyage of the Silver Dawn, 2019
  - Into the Queen's Domain, 2019
