= Mordecai Roshwald =

American novelist

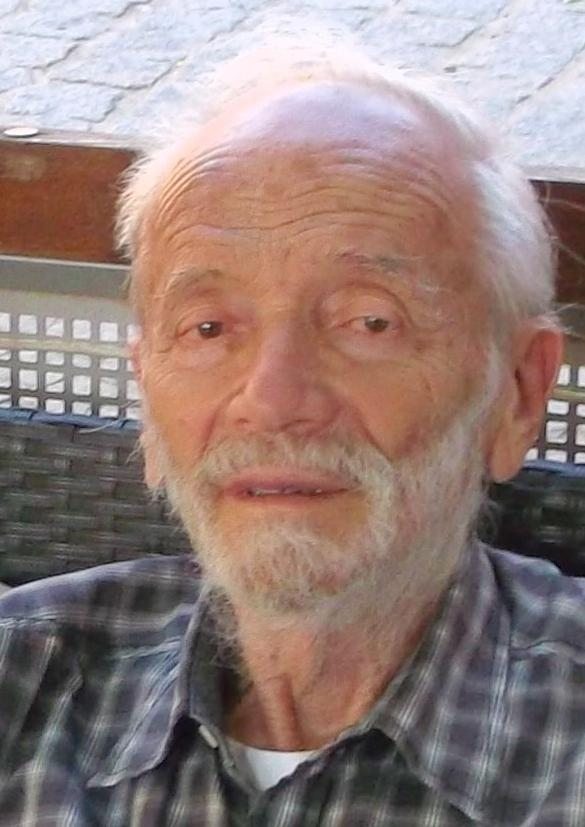
- Born: Mordecai Marceli Roshwald; May 26, 1921; Drohobycz, Poland
- Died: March 19, 2015 (aged 93); Silver Spring, Maryland, United States
- Occupations: Academic and writer

Mordecai Marceli Roshwald (May 26, 1921 – March 19, 2015) was an American academic and writer. Born in Drohobycz, Second Polish Republic (now Ukraine) to Jewish parents, Roshwald later made aliyah to the State of Israel. His most famous work is Level 7 (1959), a post-apocalyptic science fiction novel. He is also the author of A Small Armageddon (1962) and Dreams and Nightmares: Science and Technology in Myth and Fiction (2008).

Roshwald was a "professor emeritus of humanities at the University of Minnesota, and a visiting professor at many universities worldwide."

He lived in Silver Spring, Maryland, at the time of his death.
