= Catholic War Veterans =

United States veterans' organization

Catholic War Veterans of the United States of America
- Official Emblem
- Formation: May 19, 1935; 91 years ago
- Founder: Monsignor Edward J. Higgins
- Founded at: Astoria, New York
- Purpose: Veterans Service Organization
- Headquarters: Bellerose, NY
- Members: c. 7,500
- Bishop Protector: Bishop Joseph Coffey
- National Commander: Larry Wulf
- National Chaplain: Fr. Tony Mensah
- Subsidiaries: Catholic War Veterans Auxiliary
- Affiliations: Catholicism
- Website: cwv.org

Catholic War Veterans (officially called the Catholic War Veterans of the United States of America) is a national service organization of baptized Catholics that have served or are currently serving in the United States Armed Forces. Founded in 1935, the Catholic War Veterans are dedicated to serving all service members and their families regardless of their religion. Membership in the Catholic War Veterans is open to baptized Catholics, male or female, who have served on Active Duty for a period of at least 90 days, in the reserve component, or National Guard, or are currently on active duty in any branch of the military, specific war time service is not required.

== History ==
In 1935, Monsignor Edward J. Higgins a World War I veteran saw the need for an organization to serve veterans and uphold the Catholic faith. Monsignor Higgins gathered parishioners who had served in World War I together at Immaculate Conception Church in Astoria Queens, New York. This event is recognized as the first meeting of the Catholic War Veterans. On May 19, 1935, the Catholic War Veterans of the United States of America was incorporated under the laws of the State of New York. In 1935 Monsignor Higgins journeyed to Rome where Pope Pius XI bestowed his blessing upon the Catholic War Veterans, and blessed the American and Papal flags of the organization. Upon Msgr. Higgin's return from the Vatican, he was instrumental in the organization of a dozen or more posts which subsequently blossomed into the national organization. In July 1940 The Catholic War Veterans was officially recognized as a Veterans Organization by the Veterans Administration in Washington, During World War II, 1,757 members of Immaculate Conception parish in Astoria answered the call to serve their country and served in all branches of the armed forces. After World War II, Catholic War Veterans became one of the nation's most influential patriotic organizations. By 1947, membership in the organization surpassed 500,000 nationwide. During the Cold War Catholic War Veterans actively fought against the spread of communism in the United States. The organization also focused on preserving American and Catholic values while serving service members returning from the Vietnam War. President Ronald Reagan signed legislation on August 17, 1984, granting the Catholic War Veterans a Congressional Charter, being the 59th group to receive a Federal Charter, and the first explicitly religious organization to receive the honor. The organization advocated for veterans benefits and took care of the families of men who had died in the war. The Catholic War Veterans continues to serve all veterans including those returning from the War in Afghanistan (2001-2021) and the Iraq War.

== Auxiliary ==
The Catholic War Veterans Auxiliary is composed of the family of service members and veterans. The Auxiliary works side by side with the veterans serving their community, and those who have served in the armed forces.

== National Shrine ==
Immaculate Conception Church in Astoria, New York, where Monsignor Higgins founded the Catholic War Veterans has been designated the National Shrine of the Catholic War Veterans. The building was built in 1950 and designed by Henry J. McGill, one of the era's leading church architects. There are two cornerstones, one on either side of the main entrance. The one to the left of the door as you approach is the 1950 date stone. To the right is the CWV stone which depicts the original cross logo of the Catholic War Veterans. The church also includes a number of stained glass windows that commemorate the Catholic War Veterans.

== Honor Legion of the Order of St. Sebastian ==
St. Sebastian an early martyr of the Church and a Roman soldier is the patron saint of the Catholic War Veterans. The Honor Legion of the Order of Saint Sebastian is the highest honor award given by the Catholic War Veterans of the United States of America to honor a Catholic Veteran who has gone above and beyond the standard responsibilities of his post serving God, Country, and Home.

== Catholic War Veterans Triangle ==
Catholic War Veterans Triangle is a 0.01-acre (300 sq ft) public park in the South Ozone Park neighborhood of Queens, New York. It is located on a triangular block formed by Rockaway Boulevard, 116th Avenue and 122nd Street. It was created following the widening of Rockaway Boulevard in 1927. Parcels of land along Rockaway Boulevard that were too small for development were acquired by condemnation and transferred to Parks, including this triangle.

On September 25, 1938, the traffic triangle was dedicated as Catholic War Veterans Square, following an act by the City Council that gave the name to the park. The park contains a flagpole, granite crucifix memorial to the veterans, benches and red brick paving to set it apart from surrounding sidewalks. The neighborhood of South Ozone Park has a historically sizable population of Catholics, descended mainly from generations of Irish and Italian immigrants who settled in Queens.

== Notable members ==
John F. Kennedy – 35th president of the United States

Arminda Crawford – National Commander (2015–2017) First woman to lead a national veterans organization.

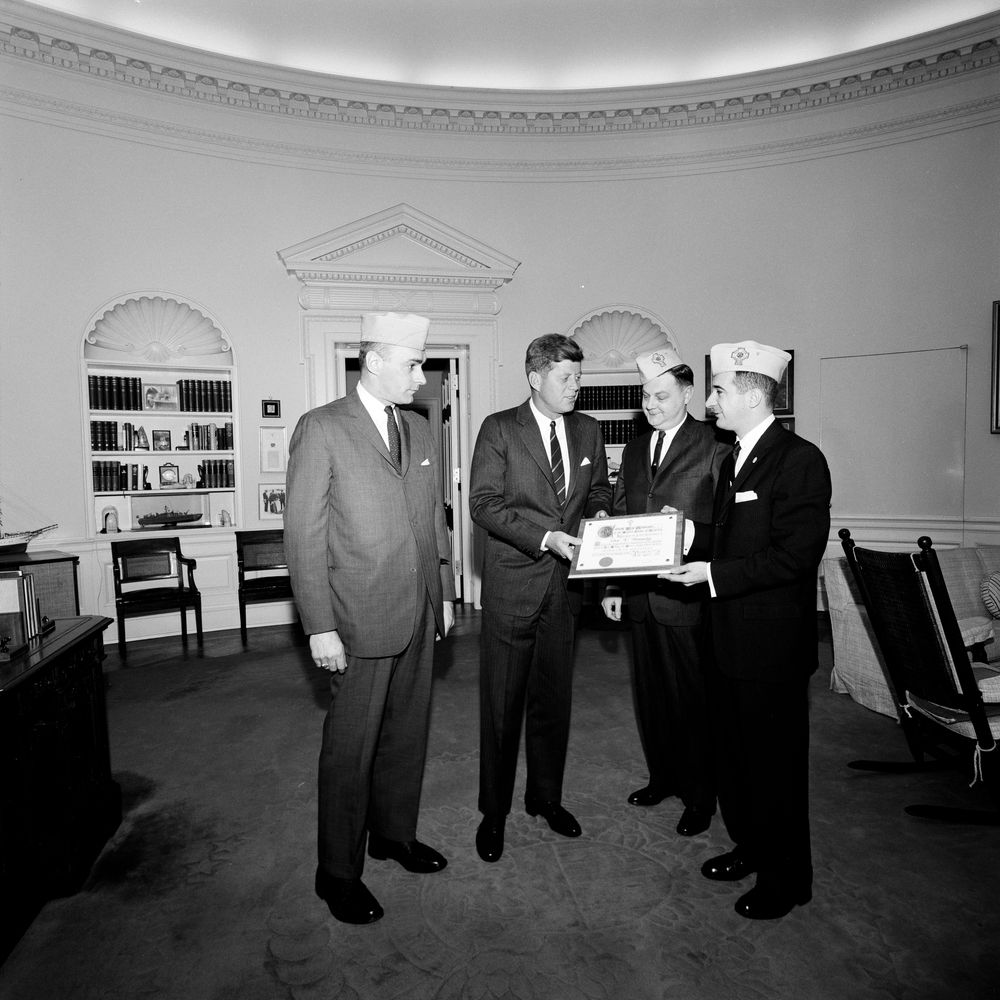
President John F. Kennedy accepts a plaque commemorating the President's induction into the Catholic War Veterans Order of St. Sebastian.
