= The Undying Fire (Pratt novel) =

1953 novel by Fletcher Pratt

- Dust jacket of first hardcover edition
- Author: Fletcher Pratt
- Cover artist: Richard Powers
- Language: English
- Genre: Science fiction
- Publisher: Ballantine Books
- Publication date: 1953
- Publication place: United States
- Media type: Print (hardcover, paperback)
- Pages: 148 pp

The Undying Fire is a science fiction novel by Fletcher Pratt. It was first published in both hardcover and paperback by Ballantine Books in 1953. The novel has also been translated into Italian. The book is an expansion of the author's novella "The Conditioned Captain," originally published in the magazine Startling Stories in the issue for May, 1953.

== Plot ==
The story involves an interstellar expedition to steal a neptunium motor from the planet Danaan, punctuated by various political and romantic complications.

== Reception ==
Groff Conklin, writing in Galaxy Science Fiction, called the book "tenuous," rating it "far below the best that Fletcher Pratt can do." He noted that "[t]he astropolitics encountered are involved and the various love motifs energetic, but neither do much to rescue the book from its basic weakness--lack of inventiveness."

The book was also reviewed by the editors of The Magazine of Fantasy & Science Fiction, August 1953, an anonymous reviewer in Startling Stories, January 1954, P. Schuyler Miller in Astounding Science Fiction, February 1954, Damon Knight in Science Fiction Adventures, March 1954, and L. Jerome Stanton in Future Science Fiction, March 1954.
