= Bruce Kellogg =

American actor (1910–1967)

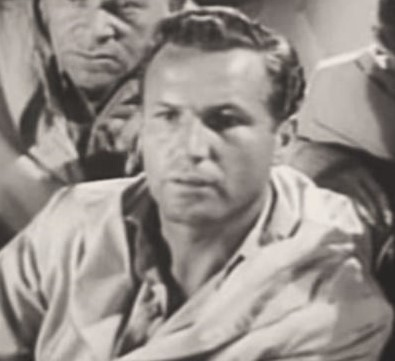
- Kellogg in Unknown World (1951)
- Born: William Bruce Kellogg; April 13, 1910; Thermopolis, Wyoming, U.S.
- Died: May 22, 1967 (aged 57); Santa Monica, California, U.S.
- Occupation: Actor
- Years active: 1942–1955
- Spouse: Lucille Norman (m. 1945)
- Children: 1

William Bruce Kellogg (April 13, 1910 – May 22, 1967) was an American actor. He was best known for playing the title role in The Deerslayer.

In the 1940s he was under contract to MGM.

Kellogg married Lucille Norman in Las Vegas on February 6, 1945, and they had a daughter.

== Select credits ==
Year	Title	Role	Notes
1942	Home in Wyomin'	Rodeo Hand	Uncredited
1942	Remember Pearl Harbor	Officer	Uncredited
1942	They Raid by Night	Sentry	
1942	Bells of Capistrano	Henchman	Uncredited
1943	Deerslayer	Deerslayer	
1944	Marriage Is a Private Affair	Young Lieutenant	Uncredited
1944	Barbary Coast Gent	Bradford Bellamy III	
1945	This Man's Navy	NATS Pilot	Uncredited
1945	They Were Expendable	Elder Tompkins M.M. 2c	
1946	Shadows Over Chinatown	Jack Tilford	
1946	Gold Town		
1948	Train to Alcatraz	Federal Officer	Uncredited
1948	The Golden Eye	Talbot Bartlett	
1949	Everybody Does It	Guard	Uncredited
1951	Unknown World	Wright Thompson	
1955	The Eternal Sea	Adjutant	Uncredited, (final film role)
