= Ben Bova bibliography =

List of published works by or about American hard science fiction author Ben Bova (1932–2020).

== Novels ==
- Out of the Sun. Holt, Rinehart & Winston. 1968. ISBN 978-0-8125-3210-4.
- Escape! (1969)
- THX 1138 (with George Lucas) (1971), based on the film THX 1138
- As on a Darkling Plain (1972)
- When the Sky Burned (1972)
- Gremlins, Go Home! (with Gordon Dickson) (1974)
- The Starcrossed (1975)
- The Multiple Man (1976)
- City of Darkness (1976)
- Colony (1979)
- Test of Fire (1982) (A revised version of When the Sky Burned)
- The Winds of Altair (1973) (Revised 1983)
- Peacekeepers (1988)
- Cyberbooks (1989)
- The Trikon Deception (with Bill Pogue) (1992)
- Triumph (1993), ISBN 0-312-85359-9 (alternate-history work, set at the end of World War II, in which Winston Churchill plots the assassination of Joseph Stalin, and in which Franklin D. Roosevelt lives past 1945)
- Death Dream (1994)
- Brothers. NEL. 1995. ISBN 0-450-61335-6. – expanded edition later republished as The Immortality Factor
- The Green Trap (2006) ISBN 978-0-7653-0924-2
- Laugh Lines (2008) (A collection of short stories, 'The Starcrossed' and 'Cyberbooks')
- The Immortality Factor. Tor. 2009. ISBN 978-0-7653-0525-1. – earlier shorter edition published as Brothers
- The Hittite (2010) (A retelling of the Iliad, linking Homer's text with known history of the Hittite Empire )
- Able One (2010)
- Mars, Inc.: The Billionaire's Club. Baen. 2013. ISBN 978-1-4516-3934-6. – a "parallel" version of the exploration of Mars, where private enterprise (and not a government program) drives the conquest.
- Transhuman (2014)
- Rescue Mode (with Les Johnson) (2014)
- Space Station Down (with Doug Beason) (2020)

Exiles series

- Exiled from Earth (1971)
- Flight of Exiles (1972)
- End of Exile (1975)
- The Exiles Trilogy (1994; omnibus combining the three novels)

Grand Tour series

Bova's Grand Tour series of novels presents a fictional treatment of human colonization of the Solar System in the late 21st century. Following Bova's suggested chronology, these are:

- Powersat (2005)
- Privateers (1985)
- Empire Builders (1993)
- Mars (1992)
- Moonrise (1996; The Moonbase Saga, v. 1)
- Moonwar (1998; The Moonbase Saga, v. 2)
- Return to Mars (1999)
- The Precipice (2001; The Asteroid Wars, v. 1)
- Farside (2013)
- Jupiter (2001)
- The Rock Rats (2002; The Asteroid Wars, v. 2)
- The Silent War (2004; The Asteroid Wars, v. 3)
- The Aftermath (2007; The Asteroid Wars, v. 4)
- Saturn (2002)
- Leviathans of Jupiter (Feb 2011)
- Titan (2006)
- Mercury (2005)
- Mars Life (2008)
- Venus (2000)
- The Return (2009)
- New Earth (2013)
- Death Wave (2015) Book One of the Star Quest Trilogy and a sequel to New Earth
- Apes and Angels (2016) Book Two of the Star Quest Trilogy
- Survival (2017) Book Three of the Star Quest Trilogy
- Earth (2019)
- Uranus (2020)
- Neptune (2021)
- Pluto (2022/2025) (posthumously completed by Les Johnson)

Bova also published a short story collection including stories that span much of the timeline, called Tales of the Grand Tour (2004)

Sam Gunn series

- Sam Gunn, Unlimited (1993) (short-story collection)
- Sam Gunn Forever (1998) (short-story collection)
- Sam Gunn Omnibus (2007)
- Sam Gunn, Jr (2022) (posthumous)

Chet Kinsman series

- The Weathermakers (1967)
- Millennium (1976)
- Colony (1978)
- Kinsman (1979)
- The Kinsman Saga (1987) (combines Millennium (1976) and Kinsman (1979); includes introduction and narrative by Bova explaining the reworking of these two novels)

Jake Ross series

- Power Play (2011)
- Power Surge (2015)
- Power Failure (2018)
- Power Challenges (2021)

Orion series

- Orion (1984)
- Vengeance of Orion (1988)
- Orion in the Dying Time (1990)
- Orion and the Conqueror (1994)
- Orion Among the Stars (1995)
- Orion and King Arthur (2011)

To Save the Sun series

- To Save the Sun (with A.J. Austin) (1992)
- To Fear the Light (with A.J. Austin) (1994)

Voyagers series

- Voyagers (1981, volume I)
- The Alien Within (1986, volume II)
- Star Brothers (1990, volume III)
- The Return (2009, volume IV)

Watchmen series

- The Star Conquerors (1959)
- Star Watchman (1964)
- The Dueling Machine (1969)

Star Quest series

- New Earth (2013)
- Death Wave (2015)
- Apes and Angels (2016)
- Survival (2017)

== Short fiction ==
Collections

- Forward in Time (1973)
- Maxwell's Demons (1979)
- E (1984)
- The Astral Mirror (1985)
- Prometheans (1986)
- Battle Station (1987)
- Future Crime (1990)
- Challenges (1994)
- Twice Seven (1998)
- New Frontiers (2014)
- The Best of Bova: Volume 1 (2016)
- The Best of Bova: Volume 2 (2016)
- The Best of Bova: Volume 3 (2017)
- My Favorites (2020)

Anthologies (edited)

- The Many Worlds of Science Fiction (1971), ISBN 0-525-34550-7
- The Science Fiction Hall of Fame, Volume Two, (1973), Volume two A OCLC 12264834 and Volume two B OCLC 12264899
- Aliens. Orbit. 1977. ISBN 0-86007-958-9.
- The Best of the Nebulas (1989), ISBN 0-312-93175-1
- The Future Quartet: Earth in the Year 2042 (1995)
- Nebula Awards Showcase 2008 (2008)
- Bova, Ben & Eric Choi, eds. (2014). Carbide tipped pens: seventeen tales of hard science fiction. New York: Tor.

Stories

Title	Year	First published	Reprinted/collected	Notes
Appointment in Sinai	1996	Bova, Ben (June 1996). "Appointment in Sinai". Analog Science Fiction and Fact. 116 (7): –.	Bova, Ben (1998). Twice seven. Avon Eos. ISBN 0-380-79741-0. Bova, Ben (2004). Tales of the Grand Tour. Tor. ISBN 0-7653-0722-7.	

== Non-fiction ==
- The Milky Way Galaxy. Holt, Rinehart & Winston. 1961.
- The amazing laser. Westminster Press. 1971.
- The Fourth State of Matter Plasma Dynamics & Tomorrow's Technology. 1971.
- Man Changes the Weather. 1973.
- The Weather Changes Man. Addison-Wesley. 1974. ISBN 0-201-00555-7.
- In Quest of Quasars. Signet. 1975. ISBN 0-451-61411-9.
- Starflight and Other Improbabilities. Westminster Press. 1973. ISBN 0-664-32520-3
- Notes to a Science Fiction Writer. Houghton Mifflin. 1975. ISBN 978-0684144344
- The High Road Houghton Mifflin. 1981. ISBN 0-395-31288-4
- Assured Survival: Putting The Star Wars Defense In Perspective. 1984. UG743.B68
- Welcome to Moonbase. Ballantine. 1987.
- The Beauty of Light. John Wiley & Sons. 1988. ISBN 0-471-62580-9.
- The Craft of Writing Science Fiction That Sells. Writers Digest Books. 1994. ISBN 0-89879-600-8
- Immortality. 1998.
- Are We Alone in the Cosmos?. 1999.
- The Story of Light. 2001.
- "Sex in space". Science. F&SF. 100 (2): 124–129. Feb 2001.
- Faint Echoes, Distant Stars: The Science and Politics of Finding Life Beyond Earth. 2004.
- "Across My Life ...". Analog. 130 (1&2): 112–114. Jan–Feb 2010.
- "John W. Campbell, Jr". Special Feature. Analog Science Fiction and Fact. 135 (6): 51–55. June 2015.

== Critical studies and reviews of Bova's work ==
Carbide tipped pens

- Sakers, Don (May 2015). "The Reference Library". Analog Science Fiction and Fact. 135 (5): 104–107.
