= Mercury in fiction =

Depictions of the planet

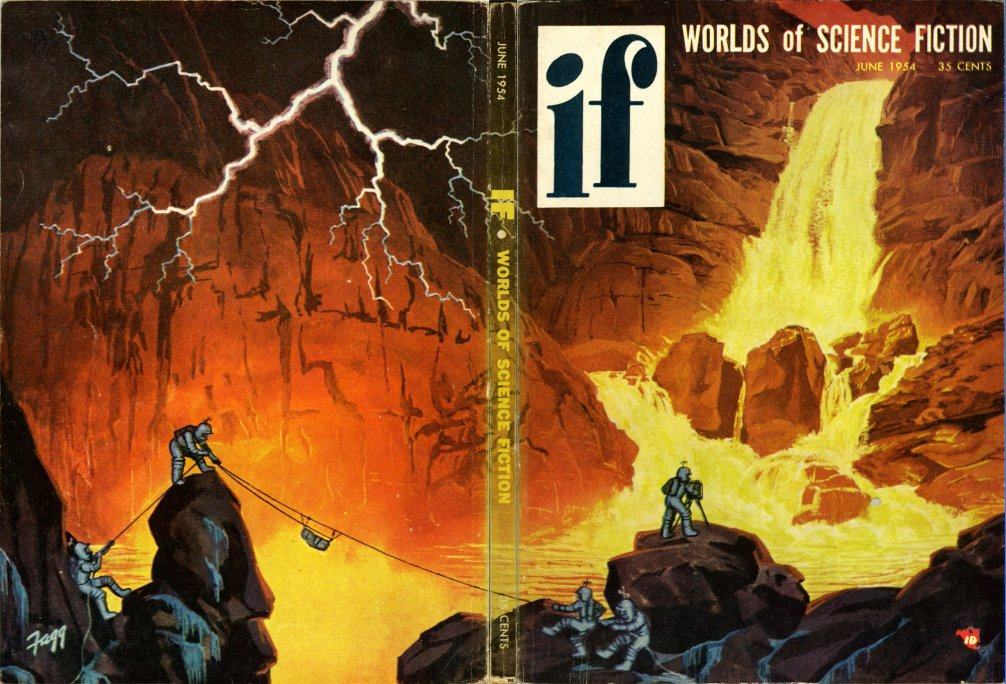
"Lava Falls on Mercury", cover of If magazine, June 1954

Fictional depictions of Mercury, the innermost planet of the Solar System, have gone through three distinct phases. Before much was known about the planet, it received scant attention. Later, when it was incorrectly believed that it was tidally locked with the Sun creating a permanent dayside and nightside, stories mainly focused on the conditions of the two sides and the narrow region of permanent twilight between. Since that misconception was dispelled in the 1960s, the planet has again received less attention from fiction writers, and stories have largely concentrated on the harsh environmental conditions that come from the planet's proximity to the Sun.

A planet closer to the Sun than Mercury was once hypothesized to exist based on then-unexplained anomalies in Mercury's orbit that have since been explained by the effects of general relativity. This hypothetical planet, Vulcan, has appeared in several stories.

== Early depictions ==
Mercury's closeness to the Sun makes astronomical observations difficult, and throughout most of history little was consequently known about the planet, which was reflected in fiction writing. It has appeared as a setting in fiction since at least the 1622 work L'Adone by Giambattista Marino, which also visits the Moon and Venus. The first novel focused specifically on Mercury was the 1750 novel Relation du Monde de Mercure (English title: The World of Mercury) by Chevalier de Béthune, which is unusual for the time in not using the fictional extraterrestrial society for purposes of satire or utopian fiction. In W. S. Lach-Szyrma's 1883 novel Aleriel, or A Voyage to Other Worlds, Mercurians are depicted as living in the planet's atmosphere. John Munro's 1897 novel A Trip to Venus portrays a brief visit to Mercury as well as Venus. The first English-language work of fiction set primarily on Mercury was William Wallace Cook's 1905 novel Adrift in the Unknown, or Adventures in a Queer Realm, a satire on United States capitalism. Homer Eon Flint's 1919 short story "The Lord of Death" depicts the ruins of a previous civilization now extinct on Mercury.

== Tidal locking ==
Actual 3:2 spin-orbit resonance of Mercury

From 1893 to the 1960s, it was believed that Mercury was 1:1 tidally locked with the Sun such that one side of Mercury was always in sunlight and the opposite side always in darkness, with a thin band of perpetual twilight in between; numerous works of fiction written in this period portray Mercury in this way. Examples include Ray Cummings' 1930 novel Tama of the Light Country where the inhabitants of Mercury live their lives under an unmoving Sun, Clark Ashton Smith's 1932 short story "The Immortals of Mercury" where there are two different hostile species on the planet, Isaac Asimov's 1942 short story "Runaround" (later included in the 1950 fix-up novel I, Robot) where a robot is sent to retrieve critical supplies from the inhospitable dayside and malfunctions, Hal Clement's 1953 novel Iceworld where aliens accustomed to much higher temperatures than those found on Earth set up camp on the hot dayside of Mercury, Asimov's 1956 short story "The Dying Night" where a character who has spent a long time on Mercury is used to there being areas in permanent darkness, Alan E. Nourse's 1956 short story "Brightside Crossing" which depicts an attempt to cross the illuminated side of the planet "because it's there" as a feat similar to the then-recent first successful ascent of Mount Everest in 1953, Poul Anderson's 1957 short story "Life Cycle" where there is a species that changes from female to male when it goes from the nightside to the dayside and vice versa, Kurt Vonnegut's 1959 novel The Sirens of Titan where there are lifeforms in caves on the nightside that live off of vibrations, and Eli Sagi's 1963 novel Harpatkotav Shel Captain Yuno Al Ha'kochav Ha'mistori (English title: The Adventures of Captain Yuno on the Mysterious Planet) where the inhabitants of the respective hemispheres are at war. Larry Niven's 1964 short story "The Coldest Place" depicts the nightside of Mercury and may be the last story of a tidally locked Mercury; between the time the story was written and when it was published, it was discovered that the planet is not tidally locked—it actually has a 3:2 spin–orbit resonance such that all sides regularly see daylight.

== Modern depictions ==
A clement twilight zone on a synchronously rotating Mercury, a swamp-and-jungle Venus, and a canal-infested Mars, while all classic science-fiction devices, are all, in fact, based upon earlier misapprehensions by planetary scientists.

— Carl Sagan, 1978

Even after it was discovered that Mercury is not tidally locked with the Sun, some stories continued to use the juxtaposition of the hot daytime side facing the Sun and the cold nighttime side facing away as a plot device; the 1982 short story "The Tortoise and O'Hare" by Grant Callin portrays an astronaut who struggles to stay on the night side of the terminator line in order to avoid dying from the heat of the dayside, and both the 1985 novel The Memory of Whiteness by Kim Stanley Robinson and the 2008 novel Saturn's Children by Charles Stross depict cities that move to stay in the sunrise area where it is neither too hot nor too cold. In general, however, most modern stories focus on the generally harsh conditions of the planet. Said science fiction scholar Gary Westfahl in 2021, "Barring some unexpected discovery, however, science-fictional visits to Mercury will probably remain uncommon".

Other purposes for Mercury in modern science fiction include as a base for studying the Sun, as in the 1980 novel Sundiver by David Brin where humans attempt to determine whether there is extraterrestrial life inside the Sun. Similarly, the planet is used as a solar power station in the 2005 novel Mercury, part of Ben Bova's Grand Tour series. It is occasionally mined for minerals, as in the 1992 video game Star Control II and the 1994 short story "Cilia-of-Gold" by Stephen Baxter which also features life below the ice in a permanently shadowed region near one of the planet's poles. The 1973 novel Rendezvous with Rama by Arthur C. Clarke portrays the descendants of human colonists on Mercury, known as Hermians, as tough and paranoid. Several stories portray struggles against bureaucratic forces, as in the 1976 short story "Render unto Caesar" by Eric Vinicoff and Marcia Martin where a Mercurian colony resists United Nations influence in order to stay independent. A terraformed Mercury enclosed in an enormous man-made structure is depicted in the 2000 short story "Romance in Extended Time" by Tom Purdom. The terraforming of Mercury is also portrayed in the 2000 music album Deltron 3030 by the group of the same name. In the 2005 short story "Kath and Quicksilver" by Larry Niven and Brenda Cooper, Mercury is threatened by the expansion of the Sun. The animated television series Invader Zim from the early 2000s depicts Mercury being turned into an enormous spacecraft. It serves as a backdrop in the 2007 film Sunshine when one spacecraft goes into orbit around Mercury before rendezvousing with another.

== Vulcan ==
Anomalies in Mercury's orbit around the Sun led Urbain Le Verrier to propose the existence of an unseen planet with an orbit interior to Mercury's exerting gravitational influence in 1859, similar to how irregularities in Uranus' orbit had led to his discovery of Neptune in 1846. This hypothesized planet was dubbed "Vulcan", and featured in several works of fiction including the 1932 short story "The Hell Planet" by Leslie F. Stone where it is mined for resources, the 1936 short story "At the Center of Gravity" by Ross Rocklynne where its hollow interior is visited, and the 1942 short story "Child of the Sun" by Leigh Brackett where it is inhabited by intelligent life. Mercury's orbital anomalies are now understood to be caused by the effects of general relativity.

== See also ==
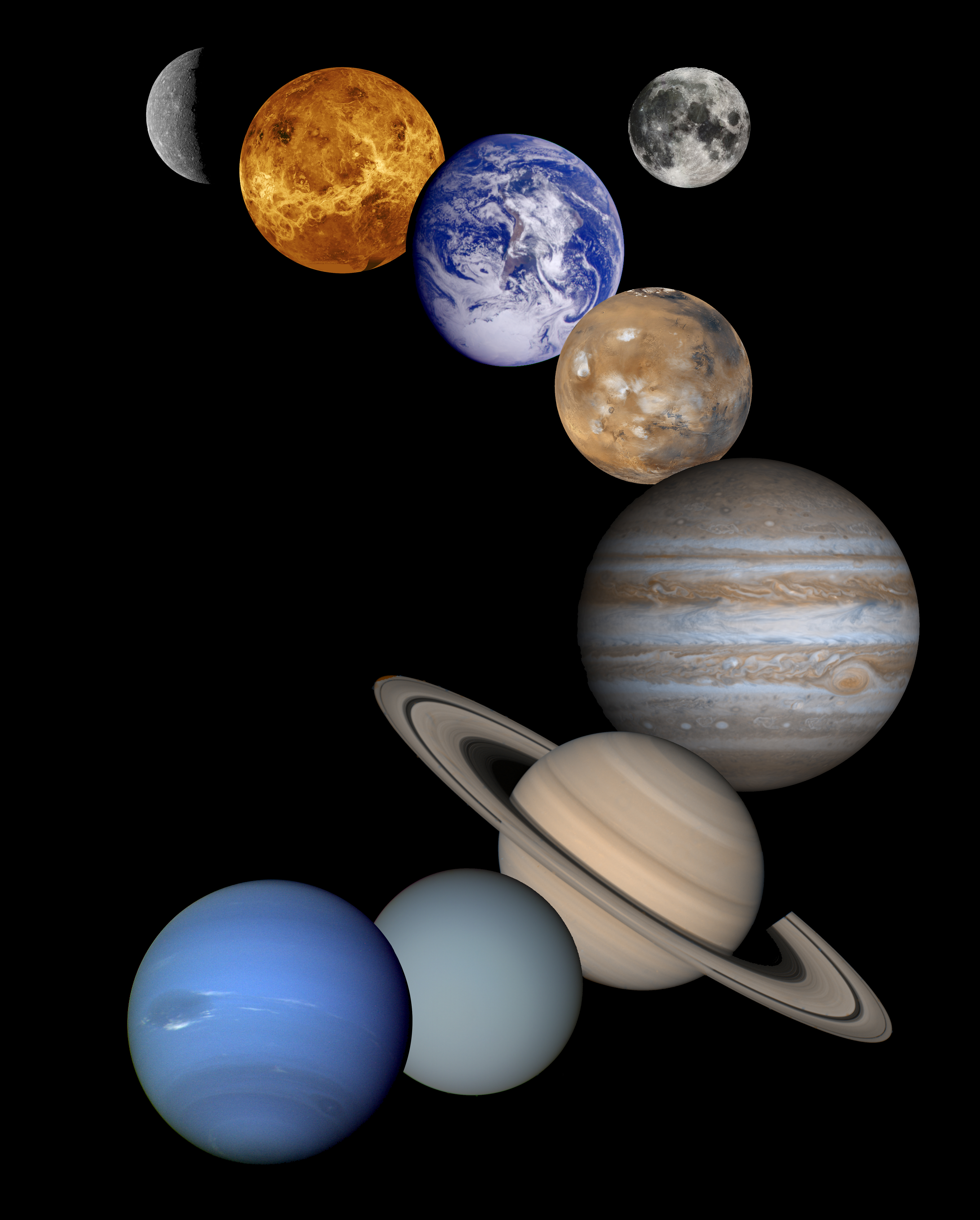
Clicking on a planet leads to the article about its depiction in fiction.

- Sun in fiction
