= Powersat (novel) =

Science fiction novel by Ben Bova

- Author: Ben Bova
- Language: English
- Series: Grand Tour
- Genre: science fiction
- Publisher: Tor Books
- Publication date: 2005
- Publication place: United States
- Media type: Print (Hardcover)
- Followed by: Mars (novel)

Powersat is a 2005 near future science fiction novel written by Ben Bova as part of the Grand Tour series. Although published after many of the novels in the series, it is set chronologically first within the series.

== Plot ==
CEO Dan Randolph of Astro Corp. has a dream of providing a desperate world with tons of clean energy; provided by solar satellites located in geosync orbit around the Earth, and wirelessly transferred. However, stubborn politicians and oil companies make the way hard; but Dan has built a space plane that will drastically reduce transportation costs, making way for cheaper and easier constructed Powersats. But when the space plane blows up upon re-entering the atmosphere, Randolph is convinced that it may not be an accident; as a shadowy terrorist group threatens to bankrupt him, and even kill him.
