= Vengeance of Orion =

1988 book by Ben Bova

- First edition cover
- Author: Ben Bova
- Cover artist: Boris Vallejo
- Language: English
- Series: Orion
- Genre: Science fiction
- Publisher: Tor Books
- Publication date: 1988
- Publication place: United States
- Media type: Print (hardcover)
- Pages: 352
- ISBN: 0-8125-3161-2
- Preceded by: Orion
- Followed by: Orion in the Dying Time

Vengeance of Orion is a 1988 science fiction novel by American writer Ben Bova. It is the sequel to Orion and follows his adventures in the time of the Greek heroes Achilles and Odysseus in the siege of Troy. The story takes up many plot elements of Homer's "Iliad" but also includes elements not appearing in Homer, such as the presence of the Hittite empire to the east of Troy.

== Plot summary ==
Orion comes into "being" as a rower on board a Greek ship headed to the city of Troy and makes friends with a talkative old man called Poletes. The Golden One, the "creator" from the previous novel in the series, soon appears to him revealing himself as Apollo the Greek god and that his plans are for the Trojans to be victorious in that era so as to create a Euro-Asian Empire. Little by little Orion remembers that he was traveling with the woman he loved on a star ship that ended up exploding while in flight. The Golden One states that Orion was punished for defying him and that the former Goddess who chose to become mortal so she and Orion could share their love together was now dead as a result of that explosion. As part of that ongoing punishment, he has resurrected Orion to serve him yet again, and during that time intending Orion to suffer the pains of the loss of his love. Orion, angered at the petty arrogance of the murderous Golden One, decides to thwart whatever plans Apollo might have for the era and ends up saving the Greek camp from being overrun by the Trojans on a counterattack. His courageous acts earn the attention of Odysseus who then adopts him as a member of his household. As a favor Orion requests that Poletes becomes his servant thereby elevating the man's station. Odysseus' first duty for Orion is to accompany him with Ajax and Nestor to Achilles' tent to persuade him to return into the fray. Achilles had earlier withdrawn from the battle because Agamemnon had taken from Bris whom he captured. Achilles however insists on only re-entering battle when High King Agamemnon apologizes to him.

Seeing this is an impossibility, Odysseus and his team withdraw and he then asks Orion to go as a herald to the Trojans with an offer of peace. Orion, sensing this will enable the Trojans to win changes the demand to the previous insulting demands brought by earlier heralds. This offer is of course rejected and while there he notices a weak point in the walls of Troy via the Western section built by men. The Trojans then send Orion back to the Greek camp with their refusal and a warning that the Hatti are coming to their defense. This news upsets the Greeks who had earlier been assured by the Hattis of their intention not to interfere in the Trojan War. Orion is then sent to the Hattis with a copy of the agreement with the Hattis only to discover that the mighty empire of the Hattis had disintegrated and the soldiers were nothing more than bandits. He then encounters a band of Hatti soldiers led by Lukka who agree to follow him back to his camp. Upon return he discovers Achilles' partner Patrocles is dead and this has prompted Achilles to enter the battle again. He faces off with Hector and defeats him cutting off his head. However, Achilles is wounded by a stray arrow piercing his heel. He later commits suicide. Lukka and his group then help in building a ramp over then Western section of the wall and by this the Greeks enter into Troy and raze the city to the ground, thus defeating Apollo's plans.

While the spoils are being shared the High King takes half of all the goods which leads to dissatisfaction. Poletes uses this to make fun of him but Agamemnon decides to blind him. This upsets Orion and he decides to leave, taking Helen with him who decided against going back to Sparta because of the barbaric way of life there. She suggests going to Egypt where she believes she would be treated civilly. On their way he meets Apollo who instructs him to assist the Israelites in their toppling of Jericho's wall before arriving in Egypt. On arrival, he is involved in palace intrigues again as Pharaoh's Chief priest has been poisoning him and usurping his power. Also, Menelaus has arrived in Egypt having been told by Nekoptah that his wife is in Egypt. Nekoptah tries to set up Orion to be killed in addition to killing his twin brother, Hetepamon. He is however, able to turn the tables against Nekoptah with the help of the crown prince and Hetepamon. He also assists the other Creators to capture Apollo who has actually gone mad and was trying to kill the others so as to be the only one and be worshiped as god. Nekoptah still tries one last time to set Orion up with Menelaus but he loses and is killed when he kidnapped Helen. However, Orion is stabbed through the heart with a spear by Nekoptah, who then dies. Orion wakes up later in the Neolithic and sees Anya, who then wakes up after he kisses her. The novel then ends with an epilogue which is the beginning of the succeeding book.
