= Mars Life =

Novel by Ben Bova

- Author: Ben Bova
- Cover artist: John Harris
- Series: Grand Tour
- Genre: Science fiction
- Publisher: Tor Books
- Publication date: 5 August 2008
- Media type: Print (Hardcover)
- Pages: 432 (Hardcover edition)
- ISBN: 978-0-7653-1787-2
- OCLC: 184823030
- LC Class: PS3552.O84M374
- Preceded by: Return to Mars

Mars Life is a science fiction novel by Ben Bova. This novel is part of the Grand Tour series of novels. It was first published in 2008 and is a sequel to Ben Bova's novel Return to Mars.

== Plot summary ==
Jamie Waterman is back as Director of the Mars Program; along with his wife Vijay, the beautiful Indian-Aussie, and Dex Trumball, the Director of the Board in charge of Mars financing. The death of his son brings Waterman and his wife back to Earth, and puts them both in a slump. Over the years, the New Morality has slowly been taking over the American government, and gaining power; the NM restricts and censors anything that is a threat to them, and hide behind religion. One of their biggest concerns is the Mars program, which is taking money away from projects that would benefit the dystopian-style Earth. As money is slowly cut off from Mars, Dex and Jamie rush to find a solution to keeps the exploration of Mars open; however, both have different views. Waterman wants to preserve the Martian life and culture, while Dex is willing to open Mars up to wealthy tourists. The Navajo scientist and Vijay return to Mars in time of great discovering; a Martian village and relics have been found, as well as what might be a graveyard, holding remains of an ancient, intelligent Martian race. Jamie struggles to find the balance of things, as time and money begin to run out.
