= Jupiter (novel) =

Novel by Ben Bova

- Cover of the UK Hardcover edition
- Author: Ben Bova
- Cover artist: Mark Harrison
- Series: Grand Tour
- Genre: Science fiction
- Publisher: Hodder & Stoughton
- Publication date: 2 Nov 2000
- Media type: Print (Hardcover)
- Pages: 444 (Hardcover edition)
- ISBN: 978-0-340-76764-1
- OCLC: 44694431

Jupiter is a science fiction novel by American writer Ben Bova. This novel is part of the Grand Tour series of novels. It was first published in 2000.

== Plot synopsis ==
Grant Archer, a young astrophysicist and recently married man dreams of exploring collapsing stars, in hope that one day he would be able to find a way in creating wormholes, to create instantaneous transportation. However, upon graduating he finds out that he must go to Jupiter on a four-year public service, enforced by the ultraconservative religious organization the "New Morality". His orders are to spy on the scientists of the space station "Gold"; where it is believed, and feared that they have found new living species living in a liquid ocean, deep below Jupiter's clouds. As Archer's anger and frustration wears off, he soon finds himself befriending the crew, and drawn to the station's super-secret project; a select few wearing bioimplants in their legs, and a mysterious spacecraft attached to the space station.

== Characters ==
- Grant Archer
- Ellis Beech - a New Morality worker, he was the one who set up Grant Archer's residency on Gold SS, in order to spy upon the scientist
- Tavalera - a young man who was aboard the same transport ship as Archer, serving a two-year public service in the Jovian system, working on a "scoop ship"; a spacecraft that collects helium-3 and other isotopes from Jupiter's atmosphere. He is also in the books "Saturn" and "Titan"
- Egon Karlstad
- Zeb Muzorawa - leading astrophysicist on Gold SS, he majors in fluid dynamics, and studies the ever swirling Jovian ocean
- Dr. Li Zhang Wo;— originally the leading astrophysicist on Gold SS before becoming its director; an unfortunate accident has left him crippled.
- Lane O'Hara- marine biologist that looks after the space stations aquaculture, as well as a few dolphins
- Ursula von Neumann - a computer scientist
- Tamiko Hideshi - a physical chemist on Gold SS
- Rodney Devlin - known as the "Red Devil", officially designated as a Chef on the Gold SS, Devlin is also the man "who can get things"
- Ignacio Quintero - a structural engineer
- Leviathan - not much is known of the entity that lives in the Jovian ocean

== Reception ==
Publishers Weekly wrote that Jupiter "provides solid action and wonder with credible alien life forms and inspired technology for exploring the Jovian depths". Jackie Cassada, reviewing for the Library Journal, wrote that Jupiter was "another first-rate adventure that combines hard science with human drama to create a challenging and compelling tale of courage and conviction."

== References to actual history, geography and contemporary science ==
The impact on Jupiter due to the comet Shoemaker-Levy 9 is mentioned when Grant Archer first arrives at Jupiter. The Galileo space probe is also mentioned as being the first in a line of missions to study the Jovian system.

== Publication history ==
- 2000, UK Hodder & Stoughton ISBN 978-0-340-76764-1, Pub Date 2 Nov 2000, Hardcover
- 2000, USA, Tor Books ISBN 978-0-312-87217-5, Pub Date December 2000, Hardcover
- 2001, UK, New English Library ISBN 978-0-340-76765-8, Pub Date 15 February 2001, Paperback
- 2002, USA, Tor Books ISBN 978-0-8125-7941-3, Pub Date 18 February 2002, Paperback
