= Titan (Bova novel) =

2006 novel by Ben Bova

First edition (UK)

Titan is a science fiction novel written by Ben Bova as part of the Grand Tour novel series. It directly follows the novel Saturn, in which the space habitat Goddard has finished its two-year journey from Earth, and has settled into the orbit of Saturn. The book won the 2007 John W. Campbell Memorial Award. It was first published in February 2006, by Hodder & Stoughton in the UK and later by Tor Books in the US.

== Plot ==
The ten thousand civilians of the space habitat Goddard have now finally begun their lives in the Saturn system, after an exhausting two-year journey that almost plunged the infant colony into an authoritarian regime. As the probe "Titan Alpha" lands on the moon's surface, a number of strange electrical problems begin happening aboard the space habitat.

== Characters ==
- Holly Lane - Director of Human Resources aboard the Goddard. Her sister, Pancho Lane, had cryo-frozen her for a couple of decades, starting in her late teens, until a cure for her disease could be found. Now, years later, after learning everything from scratch and receiving many neural boosters, Holly has become a strong-willed individual, with an eidetic memory.
- Malcolm Eberly - A former prisoner in Austria, he was released early on commands by the religious organization "New Morality", in order to install a fixed government on the habitat Goddard. Despite being involved with several mishaps during the two-year journey, Dr. Eberly escapes conviction, and is allowed to keep his position of Chief Administrator.
- Kris Cardenas - A former Nobel Prize winner, she is the foremost expert in nanotechnology; and an outcast, due to nanomachines that live in her body, which are constantly repairing and regenerating her.
- Eduoard Urbain - Chief scientist on the "Titan Alpha" project, which sends a highly sophisticated probe to Titan.
- Nadia Wunderly - Nicknamed "Lord of the Rings", due to her obsession with Saturn's rings.
- Pancho Lane - Older sister of Holly Lane, she is a recently retired CEO of the multi-billion dollar corporation of Astro Corp.
- Manny Gaeta - A former stuntman, he originally came onto the Goddard with the intention of doing the first landing on Titan; sponsored by Astro Corp. He later falls in love with Kris Cardenas, and flies through Saturn's "B" ring, where he comes upon the mysterious ice particles that make up Saturn's rings.
- James Wilmot - The original director of Goddard, he is an anthropologist who came aboard the space habitat, in order to study the evolving society of Goddard.
- Raoul Tavalera - Mentioned before in the novel Jupiter, he was not part of the original ten thousand, but is picked up in Saturn, when Gaeta saves him. He decides to stay in order to be with Holly Lane.
- Timoshenko - A chief engineer aboard Goddard, he ran for Chief Administrator but lost graciously to Eberly; he is looked to as a leader among the engineers.
