= Orion in the Dying Time =

Novel by Ben Bova

Orion in the Dying time
- First edition (h/c)
- Author: Ben Bova
- Cover artist: Boris Vallejo
- Language: English
- Series: Orion
- Genre: Science fiction
- Publisher: Tor Books
- Publication date: 1990
- Publication place: United States
- Media type: Print (Hardcover)
- Pages: 368
- ISBN: 0-8125-1429-7
- Preceded by: Vengeance of Orion
- Followed by: Orion and the Conqueror

Orion in the Dying time is a 1990 science fiction novel by American writer Ben Bova. It follows Orion as he finds himself in the Neolithic having been sent there by the Creators who plan on him stopping the mad creature set in his grandiose plans to destroy humankind and to repopulate the Earth with his kind.

== Plot summary ==
The plot starts from where it stopped in Vengeance of Orion. Orion awakes in a temple after being transported to the Neolithic era by the Creators. He then sees Anya whom he had been looking for throughout the previous novel in the series. As they leave the temple together, he spies a statue of Set initially taking it to be a man wearing a totem mask. They enter a garden and as Orion tries to take a fruit, Anya stops him warning him of Set who owns the garden. She then tells him of their mission which is to assess the situation and then come back for more equipment. As they walk on they encounter a group of slaves been guarded by a dinosaur. Orion with the help of Anya, then saves the baby from been killed and eaten by the dinosaur. The slaves been cowed warn of the retribution from their masters. Orion then decides to take them along till they get to the forest. Upon arrival in the forest, Anya tries to contact the rest of the Creators only to discover that her access has been blocked by Set thus trapping them in that era without any help. They however, try to settle down in the area and look for game to kill so as to survive. Anya, then encourages Orion to try to initiate contact maybe he would be successful.

This serves as a beacon for Set now locates them and promises to send them punishment for killing his creature. They then move deep inside the forest where, they hide and encounter another group of humans, who already live there, led by Kraal. Orion then suggests the merging of the two groups under Kraal's leadership which he reluctantly agrees to. However, that same night, Set sends huge gigantic snakes which attack them and kill quite a number of them. This almost weakens Kraal's resolve to unite his people to stand against Set. Orion however, convinces him and together with Anya, they try to unite the tribes to stand against Set. Their work is unfortunately undone by Reeva, one of the slaves whose baby Orion saved from the dinosaur and now Kraal's wife, sells Anya and Orion out to Set. They are both captured and taken to Set's fortress. Set tries to torture them in order to find out about a particular time nexus. They succeed in escaping but are unable to fight their way out. They then jump into Set's time warp device and try to use it to escape.

They find out that the time warp is too strong to be over ridden and find themselves in the Cretaceous. They try to discover what Set's plan is for that era. They are eventually captured and Set deals with Anya who with her fellow Creators abandon both the earth and Orion to Set's devilish plans in order to save their skin. However, Set plans to send Orion to a time before the Creators became aware of him to murder, them all. He almost succeeds but Orion manages to break free of his control and he allows himself to be used by the creators to destroy Sheol the sun of Set's home planet Shaydan. This sets of a cataclysm wherein the debris of Shaydan then pelts the earth with meteors which wipe out the dinosaurs leaving only mammals. However, Set survives and is hiding on earth in the Neolithic.

Orion also awakes back in the Neolithic and is intent upon revenge. He goes back into the Dark Ages and brings along the army of Subotai, general of Ogotai's Mongolian army. He then goes to Set's fortress himself to confront him. He succeeds in throwing Set's fortress into chaos. However, Set proves too strong for him until he is helped by the Creators coming out of their hiding place. Set is then thrown into a time stasis where he is left to roast forever in the flames of hell.

== Reception ==
The Publishers Weekly critic Sybil Steinberg said, "Bova's prose flows easily, the action is vividly described, and the story is enjoyable, but much of the plot defies credibility, even for this genre." Kirkus Reviews criticized the book, stating, "Brainless and often absurd, and, with lots of gore and monsters and gee-whiz folderol, clearly aimed at the more juvenile section of the audience. A disappointment after recent, more thoughtful outings like Cyberbooks and Voyagers III." In a negative review, Robert J. Conrad said, "Bova might have kept a tighter grip with a better story. His outcome is predictable and key developments telegraphed. Unaccountably, he also jolts readers out of his carefully built temporal contexts."
