= Return to Mars =

Novel by Ben Bova

- First US edition
- Author: Ben Bova
- Cover artist: Gregory Bridges
- Series: Grand Tour
- Genre: Science Fiction
- Publisher: Avon Eos (US); Hodder & Stoughton (UK)
- Publication date: 8 June 1999
- Media type: Print (hardcover)
- Pages: 416 (Hardcover edition)
- ISBN: 978-0-380-97640-9
- OCLC: 40881619
- Dewey Decimal: 813/.54 21
- LC Class: PS3552.O84 R47 1999
- Preceded by: Mars
- Followed by: Mars Life

There is also a 1955 juvenile science fiction novel of this name by W. E. Johns.
The title 'Return to Mars' was used by authors Anthony Pollock and Brian Crowley in 1989, published by Magistra (Australia) as non-fiction.

Return to Mars is a science fiction novel by Ben Bova. This novel is part of the Grand Tour series of novels. It was first published in 1999 and is a sequel to Ben Bova's novel Mars.

== Plot summary ==
Navajo geologist Jamie Waterman returned to Earth as a hero, travelling the globe, giving speeches on Mars, and supporting a return voyage. Now six years later, Waterman gets to return to his beloved red planet, and to the mysterious dwelling in the Valles Marineris region. However, the second voyage has sponsorship not from governments, but from corporations, most notably from millionaire Daryl Trumball, whose son is sent on the mission to make his father proud... and money. Now, Jamie finds himself locked in a war between Trumball's wishes of exploiting the planet, his job as mission director, and his own desires to explore the cliff dwelling that could hold the key to discovering the planet's past inhabitants.

== Characters ==
- Jamie Fox Waterman - mission director, geologist. He is the main character of the "Mars" novels by Ben Bova, drives the discovery of microbial life on Mars, as well as of a distant cliff dwelling. Waterman seems to have a connection to Mars, as connections between his Navajo beliefs and the Red Planet become entangled.
- Dex Trumball - geophysicist, son of millionaire Daryl Trumball
- Vijay J. Shektar - physician and psychologist, Australian-raised with Hindu heritage
- Trudy Hall - biologist, British
- Mistuo Fuchida - biologist, Japanese
- Peter J. Craig "Possum" - geochemist and unofficial repairman
- Stacy (Anastasia) Dezhurova - leading cosmonaut
- Tomas Rodriguez - astronaut from NASA
- Daryl C. Trumball - a heartless millionaire, whose only joy is to make money. He sponsors the second Mars mission after his son convinces him that he could make money off the expedition
- Pete Connors - an astronaut on the first Mars expedition, and friend to Jamie
- Li Chanu - director of first Mars expedition. born in Singapore

== Reception ==
Publishers Weekly, in its 1999 review, wrote that Bova made the hard science aspects of this novel vivid and appealing. His characters were "less enchanting and the inclusion of a saboteur seems like overkill, since the environment he describes more than capable of destroying anyone for simple carelessness."
