= Venus (novel) =

2000 novel by Ben Bova

- First edition (UK)
- Author: Ben Bova
- Cover artist: Mark Harrison
- Language: English
- Series: Grand Tour
- Genre: Science fiction
- Publisher: Hodder & Stoughton (UK); Tor Books (US)
- Publication date: Feb 2000 (UK); Apr 200 (US)
- Publication place: United States
- Media type: Print (hardback & paperback)
- Pages: 404
- ISBN: 0-340-72846-9
- OCLC: 42658991
- Preceded by: The Silent War
- Followed by: Mercury

Venus is a science fiction novel by American writer Ben Bova, part of the Grand Tour novel series and first published in the year 2000. The story follows Van Humphries, the son of the ruthless tycoon Martin Humphries, and his experiences on Venus.

== Plot summary ==
Martin Humphries is the head of the giant Humphries Space Systems and at his 100th birthday party announces a prize of ten billion dollars to anyone who can recover any remains of his eldest son Alex. Alex was killed two years previously on a mission to Venus. Van Humphries, Martin's son and younger brother to Alex takes up the challenge despite, and because of, a mutual dislike between son and father.

Van assembles a ship and crew and heads off to Venus, shadowed by the mysterious Lars Fuchs. Upon entering the Venusian atmosphere they find the clouds are alive with bacterial life which, unfortunately, takes a liking to the ship. The ship is soon in trouble as it is eaten away by the bacteria. Van's more conservative ship is quickly eaten away by the bacteria, while Lars's bulky ship manages to survive. Van is rescued by Lars Fuch's ship but most of his crew are lost.

Van finds Lars a brutal yet intelligent man who rules his ship with a rod of iron. The heat builds as they descend through the Venusian atmosphere. Lars has to deal with mutiny and they find out that Lars Fuchs is Van Humphries' real father. At the end of the novel the intense heat, Lars's and Van's health and volcanic activity conspire to produce a climactic finale, in which a sulfur-based lifeform is revealed to exist on Venus. Alex's remains are recovered and the money claimed.
