= The Precipice (Bova novel) =

2001 novel by Ben Bova

- First edition (UK)
- Author: Ben Bova
- Cover artist: Mark Harrison
- Series: Grand Tour
- Genre: Science fiction
- Publisher: Hodder & Stoughton (UK); Tor Books (US)
- Publication date: 01 Feb 2001 (UK); 26 October 2001 (US)
- Media type: Print (Hardcover)
- Pages: 352 (Hardcover edition)
- ISBN: 978-0-312-84876-7
- OCLC: 47098509
- Dewey Decimal: 813/.54 21
- LC Class: PS3552.O84 P65 2001
- Followed by: The Rock Rats

The Precipice is a science fiction novel by Hugo Award winner Ben Bova. This novel is part of the Grand Tour series of novels. It is the first book in The Asteroid Wars series. It was first published in 2001. The title "The Precipice" refers to the "greenhouse cliff", or the ultimate collapse of Earth's biosphere, preceded by the steady encroachment of climate change.

== Plot synopsis ==
The greenhouse effect is threatening the earth. Two rival industrialists, Dan Randolph and Martin Humphries believe that the key to earth's survival is to mine the asteroid belt and move earth's heavy industry to space.

Millionaire Dan Randolf is going bankrupt, since his aerospace company, Astro Corp, is out of work due to the "greenhouse cliff" putting Earth at a higher priority than space. Cold-hearted multi-billionaire Martin Humphries shows Randolph a fully laid-out plan to reach the Asteroid Belt and mine it for its abundant metals. Randolph immediately takes up the idea, putting his entire life savings into the plan. Humphries donates much of the funds from his own pocket, planning to use that leverage later, after Randolph has put in all of his own work, to destroy Randolph, take over Astro Corp, and have a monopoly on all metals arriving from the Asteroids Belt.

While Dan Randolph wants to distribute the Asteroids' resources fairly at a very modest price to aid in the restoration of Earth's climate system, Martin Humphries intends to take over the company and use the monopoly to his own financial gain.

== Characters ==
- Dan Randolph, protagonist
- Martin Humphries, antagonist
- George Ambrose, Dan Randolph's personal bodyguard.
- Pancho Lane, Leading astronaut, hired by Dan Randolf
- Amanda Cunningham, astronaut, also the love-object of Martin Humphries
- Lars Fuchs, asteroid specialist and love-mate of Amanda Cunningham
- Lyall Duncan, inventor of the spracecraft fusion-propulsion system
- Kris Cardenas, Nobel-laureate, solar system's top expert on nanotechnology

== Reception ==
According to Library Journal, The Precipice "highlights current environmental issues and scientific speculation while simultaneously telling a tale of heroes and villains that should appeal to most fans of hard sf.

== Publication history ==
- 2001, UK Hodder & Stoughton ISBN Hodder & Stoughton Ltd, Pub Date 1 Feb 2001, Hardcover
- 2001, USA, Tor Books ISBN 978-0-312-84876-7, Pub Date 26 October 2001, Hardcover
- 2001, UK, New English Library ISBN 978-0-340-76961-4, Pub Date 16 Aug 2001, Paperback
- 2002, USA, Tor Books ISBN 978-0-8125-7989-5, Pub Date 15 December 2002, Paperback
