= Tom Purdom =

American writer (1936–2024)

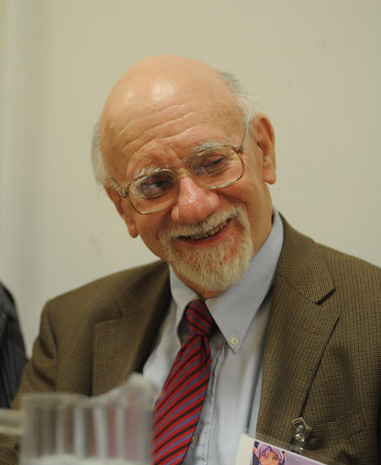
- Purdom in 2008 (photograph by Kyle Cassidy)
- Born: April 19, 1936; New Haven, Connecticut, U.S.
- Died: January 14, 2024 (aged 87)
- Occupations: Novelist; short story writer; essayist
- Spouse: Sara Wescoat Purdom
- Writing career
- Genre: Science fiction
- Website: www.philart.net/tompurdom/

Thomas Edward Purdom (April 19, 1936 – January 14, 2024) was an American writer best known for science fiction and nonfiction. His story "Fossil Games" was a nominee for the Hugo Award for Best Novelette in 2000. He has also done music criticism since 1988. His works have been translated into German, Chinese, Burmese, Russian, and Czech. He lived in Philadelphia. Purdom died on January 14, 2024, at the age of 87.

== Bibliography ==
=== Novels ===
- Bulmer, Kenneth & Tom Purdom (1964). Demons' world. I want the stars. Ace Books. (Note: I want the stars was published in a dos-à-dos binding with Bulmer's Demons' world.)
- Purdom, Tom (1966). The Tree Lord of Imeten.
- Five Against Arlane (1967)
- Reduction in Arms (1967)
- The Barons of Behavior (1972)

=== Short fiction ===
Collections

- Lovers & Fighters, Starships & Dragons (2014)
- Romance on four worlds : a Casanova quartet. Brooklyn, N.Y.: Fantastic Books. 2015.

Stories (Note: Short stories unless otherwise noted.)

=== Essays and reviews ===
- Various on Broad Street Review since 2011

Title	Year	First published	Reprinted/collected	Notes
Sordman the Protector	1960	Purdom, Tom (August 1960). "Sordman the Protector". Galaxy Science Fiction. 18 (6): 82–103.		Novelette
Courting Time	1966	Purdom, Tom (February 1966). "Courting Time". Galaxy Science Fiction. 24 (3): 49–62.		Novelette
Fossil games	1999			
Warlord	2013	Purdom, Tom (Apr–May 2013). "Warlord". Asimov's Science Fiction. 37 (4&5): 154–181.		Novelette
A stranger from a foreign ship	2013	Purdom, Tom (Sep 2013). "A stranger from a foreign ship". Asimov's Science Fiction. 37 (9): 58–69.		
Bogdavi's dream	2014	Purdom, Tom (Sep 2014). "Bogdavi's dream". Asimov's Science Fiction. 38 (9): 78–105.		Novelette
Day job	2015	Purdom, Tom (April–May 2015). "Day job". Asimov's Science Fiction. 39 (4–5): 40–53.		Novelette

=== Critical studies and reviews of Purdom's work ===
Romance on four worlds

- Sakers, Don (September 2015). "The Reference Library". Analog Science Fiction and Fact. 135 (9): 105–108.

———————
