= Romance on Four Worlds =

2015 short story collection by Tom Purdom

Romance on Four Worlds: A Casanova Quartet
- Author: Tom Purdom
- Language: English
- Genre: Science fiction
- Publisher: Fantastic Books
- Publication date: April 2015
- Pages: 150
- ISBN: 978-1-62755-635-4

Romance on Four Worlds: A Casanova Quartet is a 2015 collection of four science fiction short stories by Tom Purdom that had previously been published in Asimov's Science Fiction between 1995 and 2004. It received positive reviews upon release.

== Contents ==
The four stories in the collection, all of which originally appeared in Asimov's Science Fiction, are:

- "Romance in Lunar G" (1995)
- "Romance in Extended Time" (2000)
- "Romance with Phobic Variations" (2001)
- "Romance for Augmented Trio" (2004)

== Synopsis ==
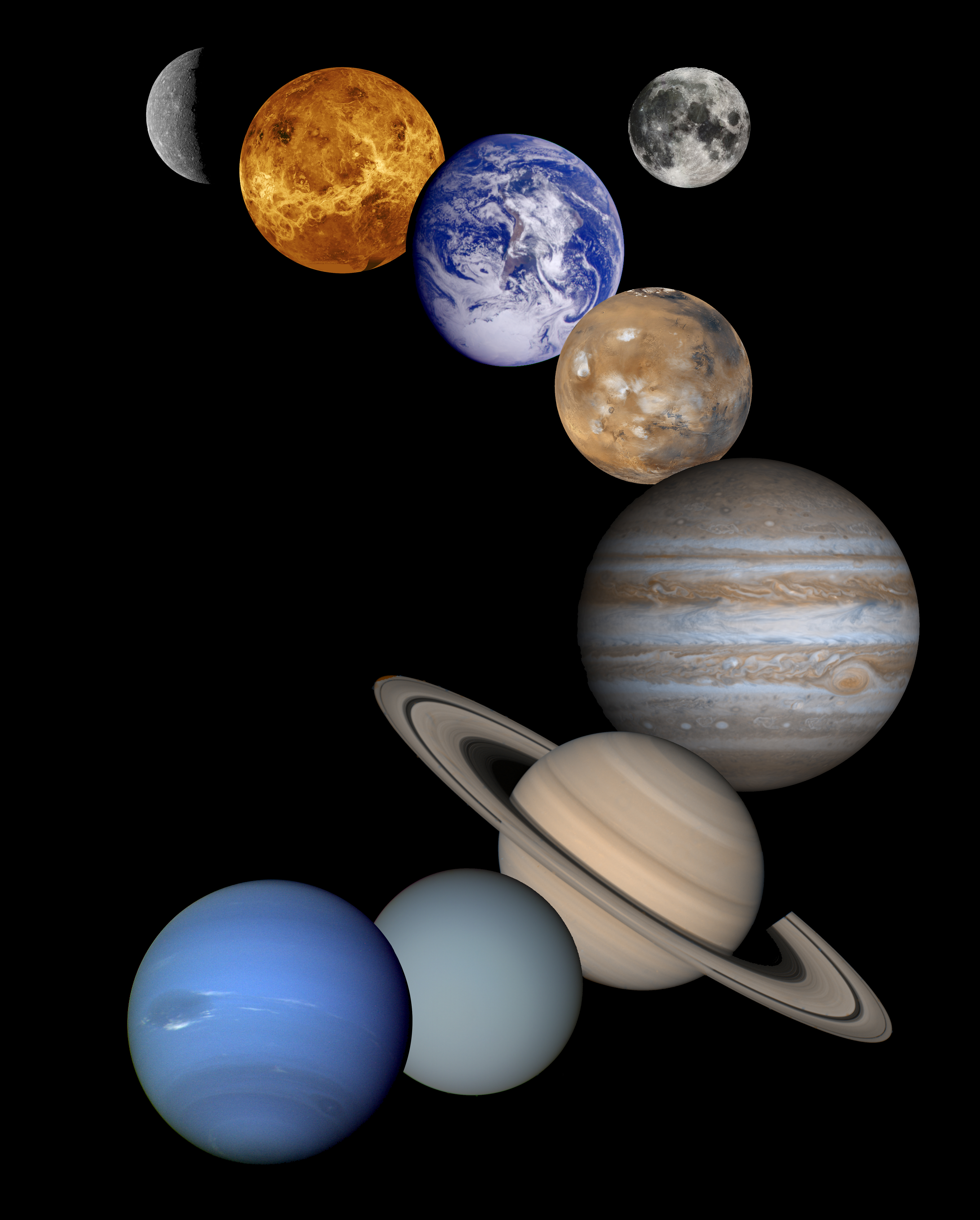
The stories are set in various locations throughout the Solar System. Clicking on a planet leads to the article about its depiction in fiction.

The stories revolve around Joseph Louis Baske, a transhuman septuagenarian who fancies himself a late-21st-century Casanova. At this point in time, humanity has progressed to a post-scarcity state and settled the Solar System.

The first story, "Romance in Lunar G", is set on the Moon. Baske pursues a woman by the name of Malita Divora, who is already in a relationship with someone else. In so doing, he gets entangled in an espionage affair.

The second story, "Romance in Extended Time", is set on Mercury, which has been terraformed. A few years have passed, and the year is 2089. Baske takes it upon himself to escort a politician to an important vote in order to spend time with Ling Chime, the politician's bodyguard. On the way there, the trio encounter opposing forces willing to use violence to prevent them from reaching their destination on time.

The third story, "Romance with Phobic Variations", is set on Mars' moon Phobos, which has been hollowed out. Baske helps out his current girlfriend Aki Nento, who is indebted to mobsters, until the adolescent son of one of his previous paramours reveals that Nento is in fact a con artist exploiting Baske's tastes in women for monetary gain, and the two of them decide to turn the tables on her.

This fourth story, "Romance for Augmented Trio", is set on a spaceship in the Kuiper belt. Baske travels with his latest love interest, Ganmei, who has the superhuman ability alter his personality at will. The two of them are captured by a villain who supplements his own intelligence with machines, and they have to use their wits to escape.

== Reception ==
A starred review in the March 16, 2015 edition of Publishers Weekly described the stories as "a pleasure from beginning to end", praising among other things the settings and the way the female characters are portrayed.

Paul Di Filippo gave the collection a positive review in Locus Online in April 2015, writing that Purdom "succeeds in fashioning some farcical yet genuinely speculative and authentic romps along themes that are noticeably and regrettably absent from so much SF". Di Filippo commended the world-building along with its progression to an increasingly more advanced future from one story to the next. He also commented that he appreciated the title's play on words with "romance" in the dual meaning of "love" and "adventure" (as in "scientific romance").

Colleen Chen, reviewing the collection for Tangent Online in May 2015, commented that she found main character Baske charming and enjoyable, if not an archetypal hero. On the interplay between the stories, she wrote that the experience was enhanced by reading them one after another, allowing her to appreciate subtler aspects of how the writing style progressed. Chen concluded that "the collection is a fun read with some depth, excellent world-building, and some interesting character building [...] These are a strong bunch of stories that are even better together".

Don Sakers, in his review of the collection in the September 2015 issue Analog Science Fiction and Fact, wrote "That the characters are engaging and believable goes without saying—Purdom writes great people—but the four societies depicted are also a lot of fun."
