= Mercury (Bova novel) =

2005 science fiction novel by Ben Bova

- First edition (UK)
- Author: Ben Bova
- Cover artist: Mark Harrison
- Language: English
- Series: Grand Tour
- Genre: Science fiction
- Publisher: Hodder & Stoughton (UK); Tor Books (US)
- Publication date: Feb 2005 (UK); Apr 2005 (US)
- Publication place: United States
- Media type: Print (hardback & paperback)
- Pages: 320 pp (Hardback)
- ISBN: 0-7653-0412-0
- OCLC: 57392128
- Dewey Decimal: 813/.54 22
- LC Class: PS3552.O84 M47 2005
- Preceded by: Venus
- Followed by: Tales of the Grand Tour

Mercury is a 2005 science fiction novel by American writer Ben Bova. The story chronicles the chain of events which leads Mance Bracknell, a shy but gifted engineering student, from the pinnacle of success to the depths of misery and vengeance. The book is part of the Grand Tour (novel series)

== Plot summary ==
Mance was the chief visionary and engineer behind the skytower, a super space elevator which ran from Ecuador all the way into low Earth orbit. When religious fundamentalists and agents of the scheming Yamagata Corporation sabotage the skytower, however, millions are killed; Mance is faced with his own guilt for the tragedy and sees himself as ostensibly responsible. He is arrested and put on trial. Things turn out even worse for Mance when his friends, bioengineer Victor Molina and Rev. Elliott Danvers, abandon him, and he is exiled to a life of hard work and misery in the Asteroid Belt, far from his beloved wife Lara—upon whom the double-crossing Victor Molina had always harbored designs. For a time, he escapes his fate in the Belt by being inducted into the crew of an ore hauler, where for a while he contemplates his life and comes to the conclusion that he was set up.

Ultimately he falls for the captain's beautiful young daughter Addie. When the same forces responsible for the destruction of the skytower destroy the freighter, Mance manages to survive by having been outside, tethered to the ship as punishment from the captain for having been caught with his daughter. Rescued against all odds, Mance is brought to the moon to recuperate, where he is able to assume the identity of the ship's late first officer, Dante Alexios, by undergoing extensive nano reconstruction to make him appear outwardly identical to Dante Alexios.

With his new persona, Mance/Dante leads a successful engineering career, which empowers him to plot his revenge against those whom he blames for his downfall: the simple but good-natured New Morality clergyman Elliott Danvers, and Molina (who has since married Lara with whom he has a child) and the Yamagata Corporation. Mance lures the three to Mercury where he manages to infiltrate the Yamagata operations and cause financially ruinous delays to their Mercurian project by planting Martian rock samples containing organic compounds there. These he allows to be discovered by Molina, who believes them to be authentically Mercurian and heralds them as a great discovery. Finally, he frames the Rev. Danvers for the trickery in order to also ruin his career, which succeeds flawlessly—to the extent that Danvers takes his own life. Yet things go awry for Mance when he confesses to Lara that it was he who set up Molina for the fall. However justified it may have been, Lara cannot accept it, nor can she return to Mance/Dante. Crushed, Bracknell turns the focus of his ruined life to consummating his final revenge on the leader of the Yamagata Corporation himself. However, it is in trying to slowly and agonizingly destroy the life of Yamagata, by exposing him to the brutal elements of the planet Mercury for a prolonged period of time, that Mance perhaps finally realizes that revenge has ruined him, and feels regret upon hearing of Danvers' fate. Furthermore, he had caught the wrong Yamagata; it was the son of the billionaire industrialist who'd been culpable in the skytower disaster.

In the end, both Yamagata and Bracknell perish in the Mercurian wastes, but the reader is led to believe, through his last will and testament, that Bracknell in his final moments beat his demons and became human again by taping a confession of his schemes while waiting to die. At the same time, Yamagata, who was gladly willing to die if only to protect his son, tapes a message to his son, imploring him to continue his true work in taking humanity to the stars in the near future.

== Reception ==
Cassada in her review for Library Journal wrote that "Bova presents a dramatic tale of ambition and vengeance coupled with an absorbing look at the inner solar system's smallest and most elusive planet. Fans of the author's technological expertise and his strong prospace bias should enjoy this action-packed tale." Publishers Weekly wrote that "The moral questions raised by Bracknell's complicated retribution scenarios about the rights of victims for revenge and the immoral consequences of moral acts add depth to an otherwise standard tale of space adventure." Roland Green in his review for Booklist said that the novel was "briskly paced" and that "this superior entry into one of the classic hard-sf sagas goings is pretty much a guaranteed crowd-pleaser." Kirkus Reviews were not very positive in their review saying that the novel was a "humdrum addition to this wide-ranging but, lately, flagging series."

== Factual Errors ==
In the chapter 'LEO Platform' Bova describes the first platform on the space elevator, at low earth orbit (500 km), as experiencing zero gravity. While spacecraft in orbit at that altitude do experience microgravity, a platform attached to a fixed space elevator would still experience some gravitational acceleration anywhere below the altitude of geostationary orbits. (See space elevator.) At the stated altitude in the novel, the platform would experience about 85% of normal surface gravity.
