= Grand Tour (novel series) =

Series of novels by Ben Bova

The Grand Tour is a series of hard science fiction novels written by American science fiction author Ben Bova.

The novels present a theme of exploration and colonization of the Solar System by humans in the late 21st century. Most of the books focus on the exploration of one particular planet or planetary moon.

Several recurring themes are presented throughout the series. In particular, most of the Solar System bodies whose exploration is the focus of a particular novel are presented as having life, either past or present. Many of the expeditions which explore the planets run into serious difficulty. The protagonists of most of these books are presented as initially weak and/or lacking in ability or confidence, and as part of surviving the trials of the story become heroic.

The future humanity as depicted in the Grand Tour novel series is divided between Greens (environmentalists) and wealthy industrialists, as well as between secularists/scientists and religious fundamentalists. These conflicts generally are presented as part of the background and often set up the initial conflicts of each of the books. In addition, several of the books reference, or indeed directly deal with, conflicts between wealthy industrialists and small, independent operators seeking to exploit the Solar System's vast untapped mineral wealth.

A major theme of the series, which takes center stage in several of the novels, is the search for life on other planets in the Solar System. Mars, Mars Life, Jupiter, Venus, Mercury, Saturn, Titan, and Leviathans of Jupiter all deal with this issue. The discovery of life in the Solar System often leads to conflicts between religious fundamentalists and scientists, with the former seeing the existence of such life as conflicting with their religious doctrines.

While each novel can be read independent of the others, and they can be read in any order, there are distinct story arcs within the series. The Moonbase arc (which may also include the Asteroid Wars arc), the Mars books, and the Saturn books, for instance, comprise various sagas within the series.

== List of novels, in chronological order ==
According to Ben Bova's official site, the Grand Tour novels take place in an approximate time sequence with many of the novels overlapping.

- Powersat (2005) - CEO Dan Randolph of Astro Corp. has a dream of providing a desperate world with tons of energy; provided by solar satellites located in geosync orbit around the Earth, and wirelessly transferred. However, stubborn politicians and oil companies make the way hard; but Dan has built a space plane that will drastically reduce transportation costs, making way for cheaper and easier constructed Powersats. But when the space plane blows up upon re-entering the atmosphere, Randolph is convinced that it may not be an accident; as a shadowy terrorist group threatens to bankrupt him, and even kill him.
- Mars (1992) - Navajo geologist Jamie Waterman is surprised to find that he will be going on the first mission to Mars, as part of the landing crew. They will only have a few months to explore the Red Planet; a few months to prove that this world is worth another mission, as this one took decades to put together. With limited supplies, the six men and women set out to explore the top of Olympus Mons and the bottom of Valles Marineris; having only each other to rely on. As the book draws to an end Waterman makes one of the biggest discoveries in the System, and finds a clue of even a bigger one.
- Moonrise (1996; The Moonbase Saga, v. 1) - Moonbase is an old lunar outpost, maintained by Masterson Corporation; it bleeds money, and most members of the Board disapprove of it. However, Paul Stavenger, old astronaut, new husband to Joanna (née Masterson) and CEO of the Masterson Corporation, has a dream of creating a sustainable colony on the Moon; but not everyone agrees with him, or his marriage. Paul views the controversial nanotechnology devices as the key to developing the Moonbase habitat, but he is murdered by a jealous family member before he can see their full potential. Almost two decades after Paul's death, his son Doug follows his Moon development vision and spearheads the expansion of Moon projects.
- Return to Mars (1999) Jamie Waterman returns to Mars after his historic first visit, but this time there are strings attached to his mission. The new expedition is funded by billionaire Dex Trumball and his father, who have their own agenda. Rather than pursuing scientific discovery, Dex and his father want to turn Mars into an attraction for space tourists. To add to the complications, Jamie and Dex are both vying for the affection of the same female member of the expedition.
- Moonwar (1998; The Moonbase Saga, v. 2) - the fanatical group "New Morality", along with their sister organizations the "Holy Disciples" and "Sword of Islam" have gained global support and power; and are dead set against anything to do with nanotechnology, which they call the "Devil's work". So when the last nations on Earth ban the practice, Moonbase is all that is left of a technology that could potentially save the entire Earth; granting asylum for a few runaways. But when the UN starts to send troops over, Director Douglas Stavenger declares independence; and begins a war that will see no one dead or all of them.
- Privateers (1985; immediately precedes Empire Builders, with most of the same cast of characters, but with an alternate history including a still-extant Soviet Union, because Bova wrote it before the U.S.S.R. collapsed. This book takes place between 2044 and 2048 (Jane is the 52nd president). As to whether Bova himself considers this book to be retconned from the series due to the discrepancy, he has never said, although the book is missing from the series list on his official website)
- Empire Builders (1993) - Young industrialist Dan Randolph still seeks to exploit the mineral wealth of the asteroid belt and explore the Solar System, as he believes that there is a fortune to be made from space-based industry. However, his plans for the future hit a snag when one of his closest friends and employees makes a horrifying discovery; the greenhouse effect will be more sudden and catastrophic in nature than anyone expected. In a few decades, the climate will hit a 'cliff', after which the ecosystem will undergo massive, catastrophic changes which, including terrible coastal flooding. Dan thinks the only way to avert this is to move all industry into space, removing the polluting effects of manufacturing and power generation from the Earth. However, the powerful Global Economic Council has also become aware of this dark future. They have their own response planned, and do not intend to allow Randolph to get in the way.
- The Precipice (2001; The Asteroid Wars, v. 1) - when Billionaire Martin Humphries comes to CEO of Astro Corp, Dan Randolph, and freely offers him a fusion space propulsion design, Dan is at the very least curious; but with his company near bankruptcy, the "bold astronaut" has no choice. Fusion rockets will allow Randolph to realize his dream of mining asteroids at a cost-effective level. However, Dan realizes that he may have gone too far this time. But Dan is uniquely motivated; the disastrous greenhouse cliff predicted years ago (see Empire Builders above) has hit. Dan, now more than ever, believes that man must harness the resources of space if humanity is to survive.
- Farside (novel) (2013) - Farside, the side of the Moon that never faces Earth, is the ideal location for an astronomical observatory. It is also the setting for a tangled web of politics, personal ambition, love, jealousy, and murder. Telescopes on Earth have detected an Earth-sized planet circling a star some thirty light-years away. Now the race is on to get pictures of that distant world, photographs and spectra that will show whether or not the planet is truly like Earth, and if it bears life. Some people, however, would rather Farside observatory not get the images.
- The Rock Rats (2002; The Asteroid Wars, v. 2) - Picks up right after The Precipice. Martin Humphries returns to complete his conquest of the Asteroid Belt, along with it riches of water and metal ores; but first, two rivals stand in his way. The first being Pancho Lane, new member on the Board of Astro Corp. The second being Lars Fuchs, an independent miner who has a dream of building a space habitat in orbit above Ceres. Each begins to raise the ante, and none are willing to back down.
- Jupiter (2001) - Takes place at least 20 years after the events of The Rock Rats. Astrophysicist Grant Archer dreams of studying black holes and pulsars, hoping to unlock the secrets of the universe. But in a world where many people are divided between being religious fundamentalists and die hard secularists, Grant is an oddity; a believer who is also a scientist. This puts him in the uncomfortable position of being recruited by the 'New Morality' as a spy. They wish to send him to Jupiter station, where the International Astronautical Authority mines the fuel for fusion power. Grant has no desire to go to Jupiter, as there is no purpose for someone of his discipline at the station, but he is in no position to refuse. Making things even more difficult, Grant has no idea what, exactly, he is being sent there to find out in the first place.
- Saturn (2003) - the space habitat Goddard is launched from Earth, on a two-year journey to Saturn; twice as far from the Sun as anyone has gone or lived before. The habitat is made up of ten thousand people; most of whom are exiles from Earth, thrown out by the New Morality, Holy Disciples or Sword of Islam. As the habitat goes further into deep space, some begin to plot and scheme; to create a new society in their eyes. However, most do not realize that they are all part of an experiment.
- The Silent War (2004; The Asteroid Wars, v. 3) Picks up about ten years after The Rock Rats. The battle for the belt continues, as hostilities flare up once again between Astro and HSS, with Lars Fuchs still caught in the middle. Things become even more dangerous, however, as the powerful Yamagata Corporation seeks to manipulate Astro and Humphries into all-out war, with the intent of taking over the badly damaged winner and claiming the belt for themselves.
- Titan (2006, John W. Campbell Memorial Award) Goddard has arrived in orbit around Saturn, and the task of exploring the moon Titan begins. At the same time, scientist Nadia Wunderly seeks to prove that there are lifeforms living in the rings of Saturn. On top of this, scheming amongst the population complicates matters even further.
- The Aftermath (2007; The Asteroid Wars, v. 4) - The novel begins at the destruction of the original Chrysalis habitat at Ceres; but with the view from the family aboard the Syracuse. As the family's ship is attacked, Victor the father separates the command module from the rest of the ship to draw the attackers away; but leaves his family no way of getting home, as they drift on a five-year orbital journey. After life-altering changes, Dorn and Elverda travel the Asteroid Belt searching for the bodies of the dead who perished in the Asteroid Wars; but Martin Humphries is bent on destroying both of them. Kao Yuan is the captain of the spacecraft Viking, which is on the mission to kill Dorn and Elverda; however, Humphries' former lover, Tamara, is the real commander, and she begins to have plans of her own. Eventually, Fate brings all these people together at the right moments in order to restore Humanity, and bring justice.
- Mars Life (2008) - Jamie Waterman is back as Director of the Mars Program; along with his wife Vijay, the beautiful Indian-Aussie, and Dex Trumball, the Director of the Board in charge of Mars financing. The death of his son bring Waterman and his wife back to Earth, and puts them both in a slump. Over the years, the New Morality has slowly been taking over the American government, and gaining power; the NM restricts and censors anything that is a threat to them, and hide behind religion. One of their biggest concerns is the Mars program, which is taking money away from projects that would benefit the dystopian-style Earth. As money is slowly cut off from Mars, Dex & Jamie rush to find a solution to keeps the exploration of Mars open; however both have different views. Waterman wants to preserve the Martian life and culture, while Dex is willing to open Mars up to wealthy tourists. The Navajo scientist and Vijay return to Mars in time of great discovering; a Martian village and relics have been found, as well as what might be a graveyard, holding remains of an ancient, intelligent Martian race. Jamie struggles to find the balance of things, as time and money begin to run out; and the answer could be found in his dreams.
- Venus (2000) - Van Humphries is the younger of the two sons of Martin Humphries; a man who ultimately despises him, and regards him as a weakling. Van's older brother, Alex, was always there to protect him, until his death on the first crewed mission sent to touch down on Venus. Now three years later, Martin Humphries is offering a 10-billion dollar reward to anyone who can bring his elder son's body home from the surface of Venus. Van is bent on proving his father view of him wrong, while rescuing his beloved brother's body; and 10-billion dollars, which he desperately needs, as his father has cut off his "allowance". But as Van and his crew near Venus, Lars Fuchs comes racing out of the belt; determined to find Alex's body, and receive the reward from his nemesis M. Humphries. Unpredicted problems, and grand discoveries are made and prove disastrous, as the two crews are brought together.
- Mercury (2005) - Industrialist and founder of Yamagata Corporation Saito Yamagata dreams of transforming the planet Mercury into a launching point for deep space missions. He has the knowledge, the funding, and the power to realize this dream, but an unexpected plot related to a disaster that occurred over a decade ago may derail his efforts. Further, evidence has been discovered that life may exist on a planet which was thought to be utterly uninhabitable to even the most elementary, and hardy, forms of life.
- Leviathans of Jupiter (Feb 2011) - Grant Archer is now director of Jupiter Station, and his mind is consumed with his one driving ambition; twenty years ago, he descended into the seas of Jupiter and encountered the massive, city sized lifeforms known as the Leviathans. Now, Grant wishes to prove what he has long suspected; that the amazing creatures are intelligent. The IAA, however, has other plans.
- The Return - The fourth and final book of the Voyagers saga bridges the Grand Tour with the Voyagers novels, as Keith Stoner, along with his wife and children, return to Earth to find it ruined by the greenhouse flooding and out of control religion. Stoner's efforts to save the Earth become intertwined with the life of Raoul Tavalera, as well as numerous other figures. (It is somewhat unclear when this novel occurs in relation to Leviathans of Jupiter, as Leviathans occurs twenty years after Jupiter, whereas the Return seemingly takes place no more than a few years after the events of Titan, which does not seem to take place more than a decade or less after Jupiter.)
- Uranus (July 2020)
- Neptune (August 2021) - The events of Uranus and Neptune appear to take place some time before New Earth but after The Return as the discovery of New Earth is announced as being a new discovery towards the end of Neptune and humans are not aware of interstellar life yet.
- New Earth (July 2013) - The world is thrilled by the discovery of an Earthlike planet on which advanced imaging shows oceans of liquid water and a breathable, oxygen-rich atmosphere. A human exploration team is dispatched to explore the planet, now nicknamed New Earth, but those on the ship know their journey will take 80 years one way, meaning all friends and family will be deceased before they can return.
- Death Wave (July 2014)
- Apes and Angels (November 2016)
- Survival (December 2017)
- Earth (July 2019)

Tales of the Grand Tour (2004) (short story collection. This work contains stories that span much of the timeline of the Grand Tour)

Official Grand Tour Chronology:

- Powersat (2005)
- Privateers (1985)
- Empire Builders (1993)
- Mars (1992)
- Moonrise (1996; The Moonbase Saga, v. 1)
- Moonwar (1998; The Moonbase Saga, v. 2)
- Return to Mars (1999)
- The Precipice (2001; The Asteroid Wars, v. 1)
- Jupiter (2001)
- The Rock Rats (2002; The Asteroid Wars, v. 2)
- The Silent War (2004; The Asteroid Wars, v. 3)
- The Aftermath (2007; The Asteroid Wars, v. 4)
- Saturn (2002)
- Leviathans of Jupiter (Feb 2011)
- Titan (2006, John W. Campbell Memorial Award)
- Mercury (2005)
- Mars Life (2008)
- Venus (2000)
- The Return (2009)
- Farside (novel) (2013)
- New Earth (2014)
- Death Wave (2015; Star Quest Trilogy v. 1)
- Apes and Angels (2016; Star Quest Trilogy v. 2)
- Survival (2017; Star Quest Trilogy v. 3)
- Earth (2019; Star Quest Trilogy v.4)
- Uranus (2020; Outer Planets Trilogy v.1)
- Neptune (2021; Outer Planets Trilogy v.2)
- Pluto (2025; Outer Planets Trilogy v.3)

== Prominent/recurring characters ==
Due to the overlapping and chronological connection of these books, certain characters appear several times throughout the Grand Tour, becoming main characters in books that are seemingly unrelated.

- George Ambrose - appeared first as a "stowaway", living in the small temporary shelters on the Moon; it was in one such shelter that he met Dan Randolph, CEO and recent pirate and fugitive. Years later, he appeared at Dan's side as his bodyguard; until the CEO's death. Afterwards, George stayed permanently in the Belt, and soon became well known and respected throughout the region. Before long, he became Head of the Ceres government, guiding the small government through the Asteroid Wars, the Chrysalis Massacre, and eventually the construction of Chrysalis II.
- Kris Cardenas - possibly the most frequently appearing character in all of the Grand Tour, she is a nanotechnologist, the best in the System. She started off very successful in her field, winning a Nobel; but when Zealots and fanatics begin calling a ban for the technology, she has no choice but to escape to the Moon. It was here that she perfected her research, and helped Selene become independent; programming nanobots to extract oxygen and helium-3 from the surface, and to construct Clipperships. Despite Selene's independence, Kris is forever banned from Earth (due to nanobots in her body that constantly heal and rejuvenate her), and can never see her husband and children again. For years this bitterness boiled, until she helped Martin Humphries design a batch of nanobot that would disable Randolph's ship, thus preventing him from helping the Earth that was in dire need of materials. Kris was eventually caught and convicted, and soon left the Earth-Moon system for the Asteroid Belt, where she never practiced nanotechnology. She would stay here for a few years, until the space habitat Goddard passed by; picking her up at Holly Lane's request, and taking her out to Saturn. From there she began to uptake nanotechnology again to help the new colony.
- Malcom Eberly - Though he only appeared in Saturn and Titan, he played the leading role as a power-mad mastermind who brilliantly negotiated his way to the top of the government of Habitat Goddard.
- Lars Fuchs - Champion of the Rock Rats, he was introduced as a nervous college student in The Precipice, where he met his wife Amanda. After the death of Dan Randolph, the newly weds became one of the first prospectors of the Belt, and eventually started a business to supply miners. The company is then driven out of business by Martin Humphries, as Fuchs reacts by hunting down and destroying the Billionaire's ships of ore, leading to the First Asteroid War. For decades Fuchs would play cat-and-mouse games out in the Belt with Humphries' hired assassins; until the 10-billion dollar rewards for the return of Alex Humphries body from Venus appeared. Bent on getting the reward, a sort of payment for all that M. Humphries has done to him. He dies shortly after succeeding his mission, due to the help of his long-lost son, he never knew he had.
- Martin Humphries - the ultimate antagonist of the Solar System, he is a cold-hearted, utterly oppressive and dominant, multi-billionaire that destroys or takes over corporations in order to add more money to his massive hoard. He was behind the death of Dan Randolph, created an aerospace industry just to thwart Astro Corporation when it was run by Pancho Lane, stole Lars Fuchs' wife, Amanda Cunningham, and hoped that his "own" son would die in a self-righteous mission to Venus. Also known by several names including Humpy, Marty, 'The Humper' and 'The Hump'. He is somewhat famous in the Grand Tour universe for his massive underground palace on the moon, where he will often hold extravagant parties.
- Priscilla "Pancho" Lane - Playing a large role in the entire Asteroid Series, she was aboard the first crewed ship to reach the Asteroid Belt, and acted as the guardian of her sister, Holly Lane, who became the main character of Saturn and Titan. Pancho herself was a large part of the novel Titan, and appeared several times throughout the Grand Tour, following The Precipice, where she first appeared.
- Dan Randolph - protagonist in Powersat, Empire Builders, and The Precipice, creator of Astro Corp. He was arguably the ignition for the entire Grand Tour. A somewhat cantankerous but good-hearted industrialist and idealist who believes that the future of humanity can be assured by tapping the resources of the Solar System, particularly the mineral wealth of the asteroid belt.
- Douglas "Doug" Stavenger - Founder and leader of Selene, a self-sufficient country on the Moon. He was injected with experimental, general-purpose, healing nanomachines after a massive overdose of radiation, and thus could not return to Earth for fear of assassination by "The New Morality". He appeared in Moonrise, was a prime protagonist in Moonwar and continued to have a say in many off-Earth affairs well into the Asteroid Series. Even after stepping down from his position in Selene and no longer holding any official position of authority, he still held considerable power and influence through the entire Solar System.
- Raoul Tavalera - appearing in Jupiter, Saturn and Titan, he played several quiet, backstage roles, seemingly always finding himself caught in the worst situations. He takes on a more prominent role than usual in The Return.
- Jane Thornton - Appeared in Powersat and Empire Builders, mentioned in other books, wife of Morgan Scanwell and love interest of Dan Randolph. She eventually becomes President of the United States. She is killed at the start of the Asteroid Wars series.
- Jamie Waterman - An underdog Native American geologist who became the recognized leader of all things related to Mars, acting as the protagonist of the three "Mars" novels.

== Recurring organizations ==
A number of groups and organizations appear multiple times in the series, particularly the large corporations that often serve as antagonists.

=== Corporations ===
- Astro Corporation - A large aerospace company founded by Dan Randolph, which has developed space planes, and was involved in the development of fusion rockets along with assistance from Humphries Space Systems. Astro pioneers asteroid mining and the colonization of the asteroid belt. After the death of Randolph, Astro was given to astronaut Pancho Lane.
- Humphries Space Systems - A large, powerful corporation owned by industrialist Martin Humphries. Often portrayed as ruthless and amoral, Humphries Space Systems will go to great lengths to take over other corporations. The primary rival to Astro Corporation and often at odds with the government of Selene. As the series progresses, HSS becomes, arguably, the most powerful entity in the Solar System.
- Yamagata Corporation - A Japanese corporation founded by Saito Yamagata, and later headed by his son. The company is involved in a number of ventures, including asteroid mining and, indirectly, the attempt to develop Powersats in orbit of Mercury. The corporation was also connected to the destruction of Mance Bracknell's space elevator.

=== Government, political and economic organizations ===
- Global Economic Council - A large global economic entity that serves as one of the antagonists in Empire Builders. The GEC is one of the first groups to become aware of the coming ecological crisis, and attempts to use it to gain control of the governments and economies of the Earth, which is largely successful. A line in the novel 'Silent War' refers to the GEC as Earth's world government in all but name.
- International Astronautical Authority. - A global organization that regulates and manages efforts to explore and colonize space. They also seem to have considerable authority on the various resources sent from across the Solar System, including the fusion fuel from Jupiter and elsewhere.
- International Consortium of Universities - A loose body that attempts to coordinate scholarly efforts among the worlds research universities. They will often send representatives to verify various claims made by scientists, such as the claim that life had been discovered on Mercury. Depicted as somewhat fractious and prone to infighting.
- International Green Party - A large transnational social and political movement with considerable visibility, influence and power. The Greens seek to levy massive taxes against the global corporations and gain as much economic and political power as possible, hoping to stop the greenhouse effect from becoming worse, as well as addressing other environmental problems. They are often at odds with the global corporations, particularly Humphries Space Systems. They play a major role in Venus.
- Selene - The Moon colony and its governing body, headed by Doug Stavenger. Selene is well known for its use of nanotechnology in various industrial and medical ventures, and is often in conflict with the governments of Earth and various corporations.

=== Religious movements ===
- Flower Dragon - An Asian group that is analogous to the New Morality and Sword of Islam. They wield influence in Korea, Thailand, and China, as well as other Asian nations. They seem to have originated in Japan. Their exact belief system is unclear, though they appear to be Buddhistic in nature. They have followers in the asteroid belt and have apparently infiltrated even the highest levels of the New Morality. This group was recruited by Yamagata Corporation to carry out the sabotage of Mance Bracknell's space elevator.
- Holy Disciples - A religious group in Europe which gained influence during the greenhouse floods. While given less attention in the novels than the New Morality, they played an indirect role in Saturn, as one of their agents was sent to undermine the efforts made in the Goddard habitat.
- New Dao Movement - Another of the various religious movements active in the later 21st century. Based in Asia and presumably based primarily on Daoism, although they play no role in the novels other than being part of the backdrop.
- New Morality - A fundamentalist religious group that exerts much influence in the United States. Although not a political group, they wield considerable power and attempt to send representatives and advisers to various other bodies and projects. While they often try to interfere with the operations of scientific projects, as well as other aspects of society, their legal authority seems to be somewhat limited. They are not, however, above resorting to illegal and unethical methods to achieve their goals.
- Sword of Islam - A fundamentalist Muslim movement in the Middle East, similar to the New Morality. They are frequently mentioned, but rarely play any role in the novels.

== See also ==
- Planetary tours in fiction
