= Ben Bova =

American writer and editor (1932–2020)

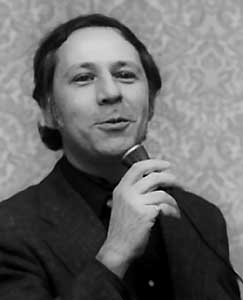
- Ben Bova in 1974
- Born: Benjamin William Bova; November 8, 1932; Philadelphia, Pennsylvania, U.S.
- Died: November 29, 2020 (aged 88); Naples, Florida, U.S.
- Education: University at Albany, SUNY (MA); California Coast University (EdD)
- Occupations: Author; essayist; journalist
- Spouse(s): Rosa Cucinotta (m. 1953; div. 1974) Barbara Berson Rose (m. 1974; died 2009) Rashida Loya (m. 2013)
- Writing career
- Genre: Science fiction
- Notable awards: Inkpot Award, Hugo Award for Best Professional Editor

Benjamin William Bova (November 8, 1932 – November 29, 2020) was an American writer and editor. During a writing career of 60 years, he was the author of more than 120 works of science fact and fiction, an editor of Analog Science Fiction and Fact, for which he won a Hugo Award six times, and an editorial director of Omni; he was also president of both the National Space Society and the Science Fiction Writers of America.

== Personal life and education ==
Benjamin William Bova was born on November 8, 1932, in Philadelphia. He graduated from South Philadelphia High School in 1949. In 1953, while attending Temple University in Philadelphia, he married Rosa Cucinotta; they had a son and a daughter. The couple divorced in 1974. That year, he married Barbara Berson Rose. Barbara Bova died on September 23, 2009. Bova dedicated his 2011 novel Power Play to Barbara. In March 2013, he announced on his website that he had remarried, to Rashida Loya.

Bova was an atheist and was critical of what he saw as the unquestioning nature of religion. He wrote an op-ed piece in 2012, in which he argued that atheists can be just as moral as religious believers.

He went back to school in the 1980s, earning a Master of Arts degree in communications in 1987 from the State University of New York at Albany and a doctor of education degree from California Coast University in 1996.

Bova died from COVID-19-related pneumonia and a stroke on November 29, 2020, at the age of 88.

He was awarded a 2020 Kate Wilhelm Solstice Award by the Science Fiction Writers of America, the citation saying, "Ben Bova was so deeply immersed in science fiction that having his name on a project was a stamp of quality, be that as an editor or as a writer. More than that, Ben was kind. He knew how hard breaking into the field was and created new opportunities for early career writers."

== Career ==
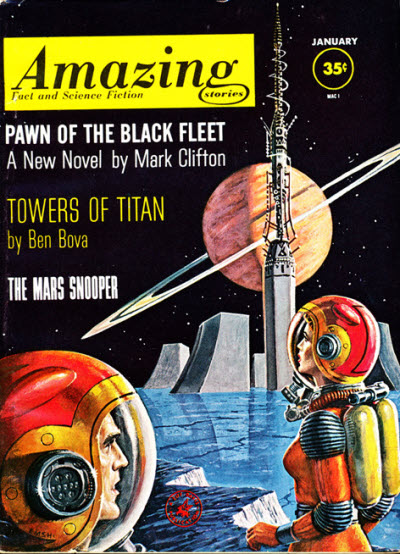
Bova's novella The Towers of Titan was the cover story in the January 1962 issue of Amazing Stories, illustrated by Ed Emshwiller.

Bova worked as a technical writer for Project Vanguard in the 1950s and later for the Avco Everett Research Laboratory

In 1972, Bova became editor of Analog Science Fact & Fiction, after John W. Campbell's death in 1971. At Analog, Bova won six Hugo Awards for Best Professional Editor.

Bova served as the science advisor for the television series The Starlost (1973), resigning as he lacked the "contractual right to remove his name from the credits." His novel The Starcrossed, loosely based on his experiences, featured a characterization of his friend and colleague Harlan Ellison as "Ron Gabriel". In 1974, he co-wrote the screenplay for an episode of the children's science-fiction television series Land of the Lost, titled "The Search". After leaving Analog in 1978, Bova went on to edit Omni, from 1978 to 1982.

Bova held the position of president emeritus of the National Space Society and served as president of Science Fiction and Fantasy Writers of America (SFWA).

In 2000, he attended the 58th World Science Fiction Convention (Chicon 2000) as the Author Guest of Honor. In 2007, Stuber/Parent Productions hired him as a consultant to provide insight into what the world may look like in the near future, for their film Repo Men (2010) starring Jude Law and Forest Whitaker. Also in 2007 he provided consulting services to Silver Pictures on the film adaptation of Richard K. Morgan's hardboiled cyberpunk science-fiction novel Altered Carbon (2002). He was awarded the Robert A. Heinlein Award in 2008 for his work in science fiction.

== Published works ==
As of February 2016, Bova had written over 124 books in various genres. He edited several works, including The Science Fiction Hall of Fame, Volume Two (1973) and Nebula Awards Showcase 2008. He wrote the Grand Tour novel series about exploration and colonization of the Solar System by humans. Reviewing a collection of 12 of the series published in 2004, Gerald Jonas in The New York Times described Bova as "the last of the great pulp writers".
